= Ocean Colour Scene discography =

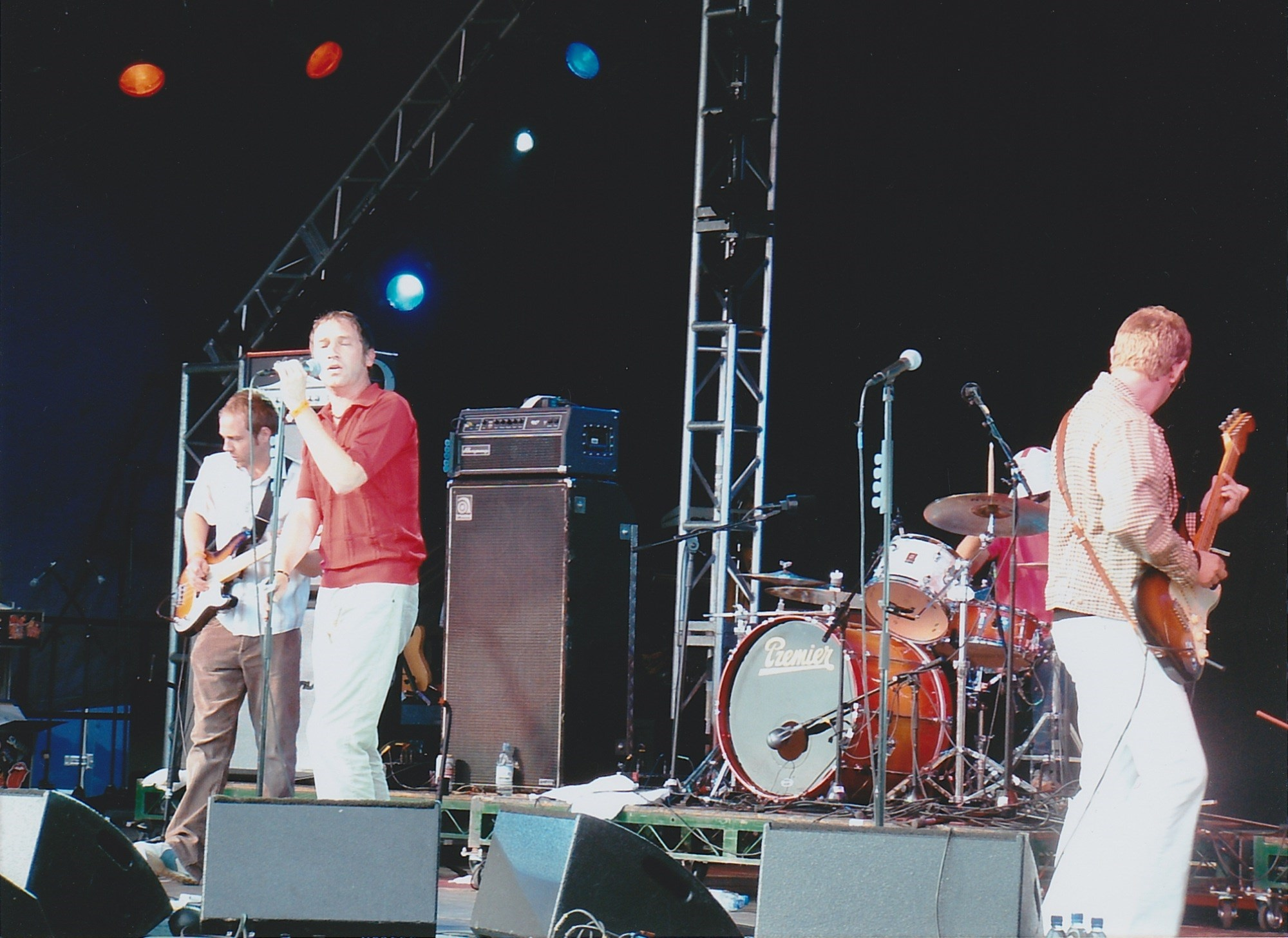
- Ocean Colour Scene performing live in 2004
- Studio albums: 10
- Live albums: 7
- Singles: 34
- B-sides: 1
- Video albums: 6
- Compilations: 4

The discography of the rock band Ocean Colour Scene consists of ten studio albums and thirty-four singles.

== Studio albums ==
Title	Album details	Peak chart positions								Certifications
Title	Album details	UK	UK Indie	GER	IRE	NED	NZ	SCO	SWE	Certifications
Ocean Colour Scene	Released: 26 May 1992; Label: Fontana (#512 269); Formats: CD, CS, LP	54	—	—	—	—	—	52	—	UK: Silver
Moseley Shoals	Released: 8 April 1996; Label: MCA (#60008); Formats: CD, CS, LP	2	—	—	64	—	23	2	—	UK: 3× Platinum
Marchin' Already	Released: 15 September 1997; Label: MCA (#60048); Formats: CD, CS, LP	1	—	—	—	93	—	1	60	UK: Platinum
One from the Modern	Released: 13 September 1999; Label: Island (#546 674); Formats: CD, CS, LP	4	—	92	—	—	—	4	—	UK: Gold
Mechanical Wonder	Released: 9 April 2001; Label: Island (#548 687); Formats: CD, CS, LP	7	—	—	5	—	—	3	—	UK: Silver
North Atlantic Drift	Released: 7 July 2003; Label: Sanctuary (#SAN160); Formats: CD, LP	14	2	—	31	—	—	7	—	UK: Silver
A Hyperactive Workout for the Flying Squad	Released: 21 March 2005; Label: Sanctuary (#SAN332); Formats: CD, LP	30	5	—	30	—	—	15	—	
On the Leyline	Released: 30 April 2007; Label: Moseley Shoals (#OCS5); Formats: CD, LP	37	—	—	43	—	—	24	—	
Saturday	Released: 1 February 2010; Label: Cooking Vinyl (#COOKCD511); Formats: CD	35	3	—	86	—	—	20	—	
Painting	Released: 11 February 2013; Label: Cooking Vinyl (#COOKCD576); Formats: CD	49	5	—	83	—	—	29	—	
"—" denotes items that did not chart or were not released in that territory.

== Compilation albums ==
Title	Album details	Peak chart positions			Certifications	Description
Title	Album details	UK	IRE	SCO	Certifications	Description
B-sides, Seasides and Freerides	Released: 3 March 1997; Label: MCA (#60034); Formats: CD, CS, LP	4	—	3	UK: Gold	B-sides compilation of material from the 'Moseley Shoals' era.
Songs for the Front Row	Released: 5 November 2001; Label: Island (#CID8111); Formats: CD, CS, LP	16	6	5	UK: Platinum	Compilation of mainly singles up to 2001 with other tracks.; Limited edition also released with bonus live CD.
Anthology	Released: 1 September 2003; Label: Island (#0773602); Formats: CD	75	71	47		Complete collection of material from up to 2001, including singles and B-sides.
The Collection	Released: 13 August 2007; Label: Universal (#9849047); Formats: CD	—	—	—		A compilation released on the Spectrum label.
21	Released: 11 October 2010; Label: Universal (#5330775); Formats: CD	181	—	—	UK: Silver	Four CD compilation spanning the 21-year history of the band.
"—" denotes items that did not chart or were not released in that territory.

== Live albums ==
Title	Album details	Peak chart positions					Certifications	Description
Title	Album details	UK	UK Indie	UK Vinyl	IRE	SCO	Certifications	Description
Live on the Riverboat	Released: 7 December 2002; Label: Ocean Colour Scene; Formats: CD	—	—	—	—	—		Live recording of an acoustic concert by Simon Fowler and Oscar Harrison.; Limited edition 3000 copies via band website.
Live – One for the Road	Released: 20 September 2004; Label: Sanctuary (#SANCD310); Formats: CD	99	11	—	—	59		Live album taken from their 2004 summer festival tour.
Live Acoustic at the Jam House	Released: 8 May 2006; Label: Moseley Shoals (#OCS2); Formats: CD	73	—	—	88	48		Live album from a Birmingham acoustic gig in mid-February 2006.
Live at Birmingham Academy	Released: 17 December 2006; Label: Live Here Now (#OCSLIVE001); Formats: CD	—	—	—	—	—		Live album from a Birmingham Carling Academy gig on 17 December 2006.
The BBC Sessions	Released: 26 February 2007; Label: Universal (#9845411); Formats: CD, download	—	—	—	—	—		Live performances taken from 1990 to 1997 on BBC Radio 1.; Released as exclusive download from iTunes, later on CD.
Live at Bridgewater Hall with Q Strings	Released: 18 April 2015; Label: Moseley Shoals (#OCS25); Formats: CD, LP, download	—	—	37	—	—		Record Store Day 2015 release.
Moseley Shoals – Live	Released: 22 April 2017; Label: Moseley Shoals (#OCSV4); Formats: LP	—	16	9	—	—		Record Store Day 2017 release. Live at the Hydro.; Limited edition picture disc - 1000 copies pressed.; Came with a 20th anniversary programme.
"—" denotes items that did not chart or were not released in that territory.

== Singles ==
Year	Title	Peak chart positions								Certifications	Album
Year	Title	UK	UK Indie	EUR	IRE	NED	NZ	SCO	SPA	Certifications	Album
1990	"One of Those Days"	—	—	—	—	—	—	—	—		Ocean Colour Scene
1990	"Sway"	116	—	—	—	—	—	—	—		Ocean Colour Scene
1991	"Yesterday Today"	49	—	—	—	—	—	—	—		Ocean Colour Scene
1992	"Sway" (re-issue)	88	—	—	—	—	—	—			Ocean Colour Scene
1992	"Giving It All Away"	83	—	—	—	—	—	—	—		Ocean Colour Scene
1992	"Do Yourself A Favour"	94	—	—	—	—	—	—	—		Ocean Colour Scene
1996	"The Riverboat Song"	15	—	40	—	—	37	13	—	UK: Gold	Moseley Shoals
1996	"You've Got It Bad"	7	—	—	—	—	—	4	—		Moseley Shoals
1996	"The Day We Caught the Train"	4	—	31	—	—	—	4	—	UK: Platinum	Moseley Shoals
1996	"The Circle"	6	—	—	—	—	—	3	—		Moseley Shoals
1997	"Hundred Mile High City"	4	—	—	15	98	—	3	—	UK: Silver	Marchin' Already
1997	"Travellers Tune"	5	—	—	30	—	—	3	—		Marchin' Already
1997	"Better Day"	9	—	—	—	—	—	5	—		Marchin' Already
1998	"It's a Beautiful Thing" (with P. P. Arnold)	12	—	—	27	75	—	6	—		Marchin' Already
1999	"Profit in Peace"	13	—	—	17	—	—	6	—		One from the Modern
1999	"So Low"	34	—	—	—	—	—	19	—		One from the Modern
2000	"July" / "I Am the News"	31	—	—	41	—	—	15	—		One from the Modern
2001	"Up on the Downside"	19	—	—	15	86	—	9	18		Mechanical Wonder
2001	"Mechanical Wonder"	49	—	—	—	—	—	35	—		Mechanical Wonder
2001	"Crazy Lowdown Ways"	64	—	—	—	—	—	52	—		Songs for the Front Row
2003	"I Just Need Myself"	13	1	—	30	—	—	11	—		North Atlantic Drift
2003	"Make the Deal"	35	4	—	—	—	—	30	—		North Atlantic Drift
2003	"Golden Gate Bridge"	40	4	—	—	—	—	34	—		North Atlantic Drift
2005	"Free My Name"	23	2	—	46	89	—	14	—		A Hyperactive Workout for the Flying Squad
2005	"This Day Should Last Forever"	53	—	—	—	—	—	—	—		A Hyperactive Workout for the Flying Squad
2007	"I Told You So"	34	—	—	—	—	—	8	—		On the Leyline
2007	"I Just Got Over You"	112	—	—	—	—	—	17	—		On the Leyline
2007	"Go to Sea"	—	—	—	—	—	—	—	—		On the Leyline
2010	"Magic Carpet Days"	190	27	—	—	—	—	—	—		Saturday
2010	"Saturday"	—	—	—	—	—	—	—	—		Saturday
2013	"Painting"	—	—	—	—	—	—	—	—		Painting
2013	"Doodle Book"	—	—	—	—	—	—	—	—		Painting
"—" denotes items that did not chart or were not released in that territory.

== Video albums ==
- 1997: Times of Our Lives (VHS)
- 1998: Travellers Tune (VHS)
- 2003: Filmed from the Front Row (DVD)
- 2008: Live at the Town Hall (DVD)
- 2011: Moseley Shoals live in Birmingham (DVD/2xCD)
- 2013: Marchin' Already live at the Glasgow Barrowland (DVD/2xCD)
