= List of UK top-ten singles in 1996 =

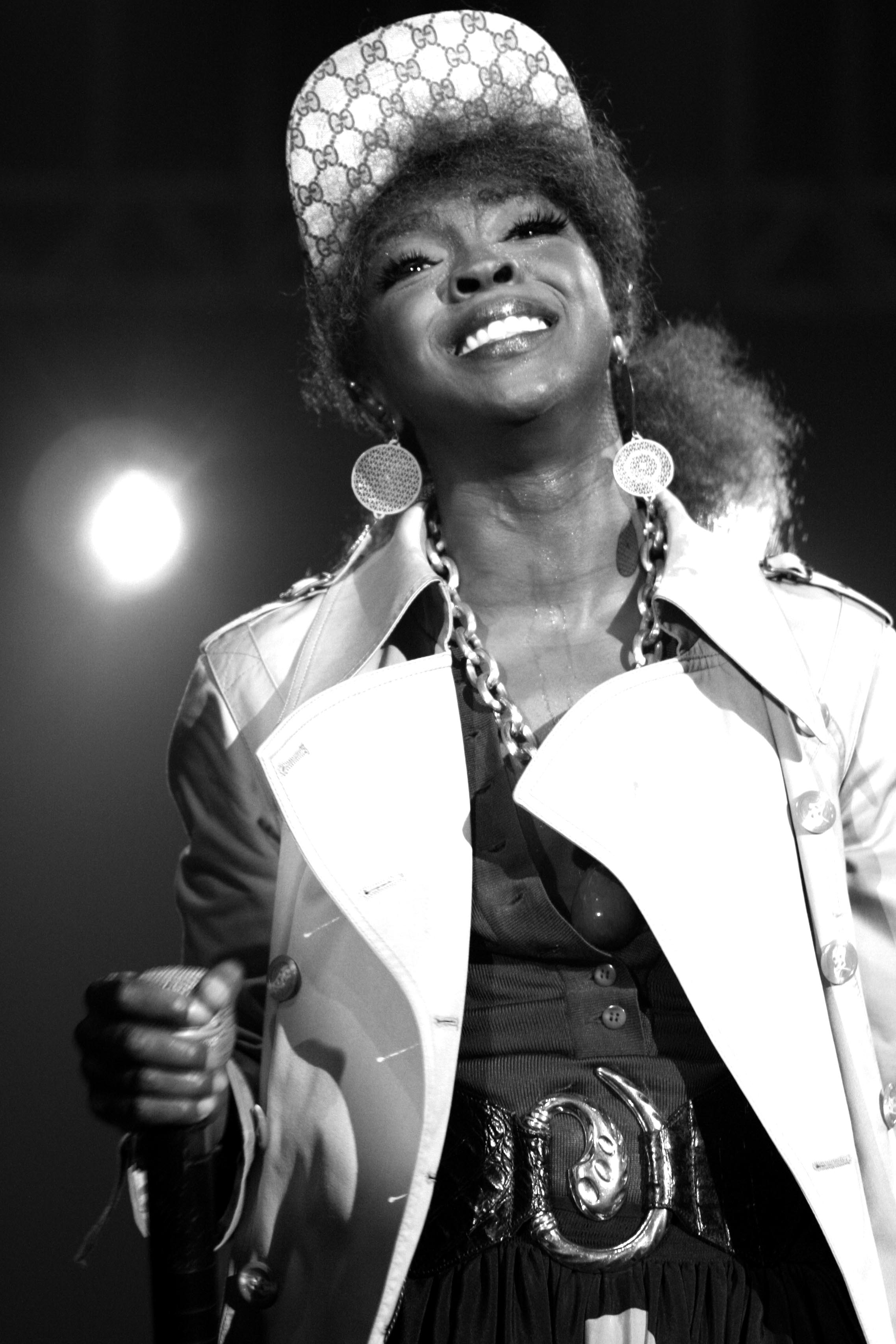
Lauryn Hill (pictured in 2007) and her band Fugees had the best selling single of 1996 with their cover of Roberta Flack's "Killing Me Softly", which spent five non-consecutive weeks at number-one in June and July. The group scored a second chart-topper with "Ready or Not" in September while their cover of Bob Marley's "No Woman, No Cry" reached number two in November.

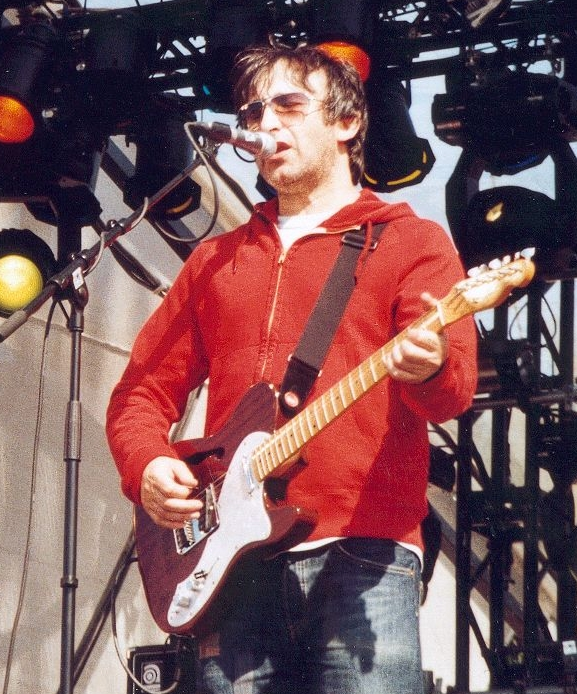
Ian Broudie (pictured in 2007) and his band The Lightning Seeds collaborated with comedians David Baddiel and Frank Skinner on the song "Three Lions", recorded for the 1996 UEFA European Football Championship. The song spent nine weeks in the top 10 and had two non-consecutive weeks at number-one. Since its initial release, the song has continued to reappear in the UK charts around major football tournaments involving the England team; it reached number-one again in 2018 after England lost to Croatia in the semi-final of that year's FIFA World Cup.

The UK Singles Chart is one of many music charts compiled by the Official Charts Company that calculates the best-selling singles of the week in the United Kingdom. Before 2004, the chart was only based on the sales of physical singles. This list shows singles that peaked in the Top 10 of the UK Singles Chart during 1996, as well as singles which peaked in 1995 but were in the top 10 in 1996. The entry date is when the single appeared in the top 10 for the first time (week ending, as published by the Official Charts Company, which is six days after the chart is announced).

One-hundred and ninety-five singles were in the top ten in 1996. Nine singles from 1995 remained in the top 10 for several weeks at the beginning of the year. "I Am Blessed" by Eternal was the only single from 1995 to reach its peak in 1996. Forty-nine artists scored multiple entries in the top 10 in 1996. Backstreet Boys, The Chemical Brothers, Faithless, Lighthouse Family and Spice Girls were among the many artists who achieved their first UK charting top 10 single in 1996.

The 1995 Christmas number-one, "Earth Song" by Michael Jackson, remained at number-one for the first two weeks of 1996. The first new number-one single of the year was "Jesus to a Child" by George Michael. Overall, twenty-four different singles peaked at number-one in 1996, with Spice Girls (3) having the most singles hit that position.

== Background ==
=== Multiple entries ===
One-hundred and ninety-five singles charted in the top 10 in 1996, with one-hundred and eighty-seven singles reaching their peak this year.

Forty-nine artists scored multiple entries in the top 10 in 1996. Boyzone, Celine Dion, Eternal, Manic Street Preachers, Mark Morrison and Michael Jackson shared the record for the most top ten singles in 1996 with four hit singles each. Two of Boyzone's singles reached number-one: the Bee Gees cover "Words" in October and their album title track "A Different Beat" in December. The other hits were "Father and Son", which reached number 2 at the end of 1995, and "Coming Home Now", which charted at number 4 in March. Another all-male group, Manic Street Preachers from Wales, had four top ten singles, with the highest charting "A Design for Life" reaching number two in April. Of the other artists, Michael Jackson had a number-one hit with "Earth Song"; Celine Dion peaked at number 3 with "It's All Coming Back to Me Now"; Mark Morrison reached number-one with his signature-song "Return of the Mack" and Eternal's biggest hit was "Someday", which peaked at number 4.

Gina G was one of a number of artists with two top-ten entries, including the number-one single "Ooh Aah...Just a Little Bit". The Beautiful South, Cast, Jamiroquai, Mariah Carey and Suede were among the other artists who had multiple top 10 entries in 1996.

=== Chart debuts ===
Seventy-nine artists achieved their first top 10 single in 1996, either as a lead or featured artist. Of these, eight went on to record another hit single that year: Ash, Backstreet Boys, Dr. Dre, Faithless, Garbage, Gina G, Sleeper and Terrorvision. 3T, The Bluetones, Cast, Fugees, Kula Shaker, Ocean Colour Scene and Robert Miles all had a second single make the top ten. Mark Morrison had three other entries in his breakthrough year.

The following table (collapsed on desktop site) does not include acts who had previously charted as part of a group and secured their first top 10 solo single.

| Artist | Number of top 10s | First entry | Chart position | Other entries |
|---|---|---|---|---|
| Molella | 1 | "If You Wanna Party" | 9 | — |
| Cast | 3 | "Sandstorm" | 8 | "Walkaway" (9), "Flying" (4) |
| Babylon Zoo | 1 | "Spaceman" | 1 | — |
| Goldbug | 1 | "Whole Lotta Love" | 3 | — |
| 3T | 3 | "Anything" | 2 | "Why" (2), "I Need You" (3) |
| The Bluetones | 3 | "Slight Return" | 2 | "Cut Some Rug"/"Castle Rock" (7), "Marblehead Johnson" (7) |
| Dog Eat Dog | 1 | "No Front - The Remixes" | 9 | — |
| Lighthouse Family | 1 | "Lifted" | 4 | — |
| Etta James | 1 | "I Just Want to Make Love to You" | 5 | — |
| Joan Osborne | 1 | "One of Us" | 6 | — |
| Technohead | 1 | "I Wanna Be a Hippy" | 6 | — |
| Luniz | 1 | "I Got 5 On It" | 3 | — |
| Robert Miles | 3 | "Children" | 2 | "Fable" (7), "One and One" (3) |
| Terrorvision | 2 | "Perseverance" | 5 | "Bad Actress" (10) |
| Gusto | 1 | "Disco's Revenge" | 10 | — |
| Gat Decor | 1 | "Passion (Remix)" | 6 | — |
| Mark Morrison | 4 | "Return of the Mack" | 1 | "Crazy" (6), "Trippin'" (8), "Horny" (5) |
| Garbage | 2 | "Stupid Girl" | 4 | "Milk" (10) |
| Shed Seven | 1 | "Going for Gold" | 8 | — |
| Menswear | 1 | "Being Brave" | 10 | — |
| Mark Snow | 1 | "The X Files" | 2 | — |
| Ken Doh | 1 | "Nakasaki (EP)" | 7 | — |
| Gina G | 2 | "Ooh Aah... Just a Little Bit" | 1 | "I Belong to You" (6) |
| Ocean Colour Scene | 3 | "You've Got It Bad" | 7 | "The Day We Caught the Train" (4), "The Circle" (6) |
| DJ Dado | 1 | "X-Files" | 8 | — |
| 2Pac | 1 | "California Love" | 6 | — |
| Dr. Dre | 2 | "California Love" | 6 | "No Diggity" (9) |
| Rage Against the Machine | 1 | "Bulls on Parade" | 8 | — |
| The Presidents of the United States of America | 1 | "Peaches" | 8 | — |
| Ash | 2 | "Goldfinger" | 5 | "Oh Yeah" (6) |
| Lisa Marie Experience | 1 | "Keep on Jumpin'" | 7 | — |
| The Manchester United FA Cup Squad 1996 | 1 | "Move Move Move (The Red Tribe)" | 6 | — |
| Sleeper | 2 | "Sale of the Century" | 10 | "Nice Guy Eddie" (10) |
| Busta Rhymes | 1 | "Woo-Hah!! Got You All in Check" | 8 | — |
| Klubbheads | 1 | "Klubbhopping" | 10 | — |
| Boot Room Boyz | 1 | "Pass & Move (It's the Liverpool Groove)" | 4 | — |
| The Smashing Pumpkins | 1 | "Tonight, Tonight" | 7 | — |
| Tony Rich Project | 1 | "Nobody Knows" | 4 | — |
| John Alford | 1 | "Blue Moon"/"Only You" | 9 | — |
| David Baddiel | 1 | "Three Lions (Football's Coming Home)" | 1 | — |
| Frank Skinner | 1 | "Three Lions (Football's Coming Home)" | 1 | — |
| The Lightning Seeds | 1 | "Three Lions (Football's Coming Home)" | 1 | — |
| Bubbler Ranx | 1 | "Mysterious Girl" | 2 | — |
| Fugees | 3 | "Killing Me Softly" | 1 | "Ready or Not" (1), "No Woman, No Cry" (2) |
| Pianoman | 1 | "Blurred" | 6 | — |
| Joe Strummer | 1 | "England's Irie" | 6 | — |
| Keith Allen | 1 | "England's Irie" | 6 | — |
| Kula Shaker | 3 | "Tattva" | 4 | "Hey Dude" (2), "Govinda" (7) |
| Alison Limerick | 1 | "Where Love Lives '96" | 9 | — |
| Underworld | 1 | "Born Slippy Nuxx" | 2 | — |
| Todd Terry | 1 | "Keep on Jumpin'" | 8 | — |
| Martha Wash | 1 | "Keep on Jumpin'" | 8 | — |
| Spice Girls | 3 | "Wannabe" | 1 | "Say You'll Be There" (1), "2 Become 1" (1) |
| Los del Rio | 1 | "Macarena" | 2 | — |
| Alanis Morissette | 1 | "Head over Feet" | 7 | — |
| Dodgy | 1 | "Good Enough" | 4 | — |
| Bone Thugs-N-Harmony | 1 | "Tha Crossroads" | 8 | — |
| OMC | 1 | "How Bizarre" | 5 | — |
| Backstreet Boys | 2 | "We've Got It Goin' On" | 3 | "I'll Never Break Your Heart" (8) |
| Ant & Dec | 1 | "Better Watch Out" | 10 | — |
| Space | 1 | "Me and You Versus the World" | 9 | — |
| Stretch 'N' Vern | 1 | "I'm Alive" | 6 | — |
| Maddog | 1 | "I'm Alive" | 6 | — |
| Deep Blue Something | 1 | "Breakfast at Tiffany's" | 1 | — |
| B.B.E. | 1 | "Seven Days and One Week" | 3 | — |
| Donna Lewis | 1 | "I Love You Always Forever" | 5 | — |
| The Chemical Brothers | 1 | "Setting Sun" | 1 | — |
| Babybird | 1 | "You're Gorgeous" | 3 | — |
| Blackstreet | 1 | "No Diggity" | 9 | — |
| Faithless | 2 | "Insomnia" | 3 | "Salva Mea" (9) |
| Reef | 1 | "Place Your Hands" | 6 | — |
| 911 | 1 | "Don't Make Me Wait" | 10 | — |
| Maria Nayler | 1 | "One and One" | 3 | — |
| The Woolpackers | 1 | "Hillbilly Rock Hillbilly Roll" | 5 | — |
| Adina Howard | 1 | "What's Love Got to Do with It" | 2 | — |
| Tricky | 1 | "Milk" | 10 | — |
| Damage | 1 | "Forever" | 6 | — |
| Dunblane | 1 | "Knockin' on Heaven's Door"/"Throw These Guns Away" | 1 | — |

Notes

Peter Andre made his top 10 debut with his own single, “Mysterious Girl”, one of three top ten singles in 1996, but the previous year he was part of the Childliners collective who reached number 9 with “The Gift of Christmas”. Goldbug included Richard Walmsley who was a former member of Beatmasters, the production team who debuted in 1987 with "Rok da House". U2's Adam Clayton had appeared on a track outside the group before, the Band Aid charity single "Do They Know It's Christmas?" in 1984. However his collaboration with fellow U2 member Larry Mullen Jr. on "Theme from Mission: Impossible" was his official solo top 10 debut.

Wink previously charted under the name Josh Wink but a shortened version was used for the "Higher State of Consciousness" remix. Backstreet Boys appeared on "The Gift of Christmas" charity single in 1995 but "We've Got It Goin' On" was their first entry as a group. Acting and singing duo Ant & Dec had previous chart credits under the name PJ & Duncan, including debut single "Let's Get Ready to Rhumble".

Robbie Williams had left Take That in 1995 and his debut solo single arrived this year, a cover of "Freedom! '90" by George Michael, renamed as "Freedom" and peaking in second spot. Former bandmates Gary Barlow and Mark Owen both launched solo careers in 1996 after the group went on hiatus - Barlow's "Forever Love" topped the chart, with Owen's "Child" reaching number 3.

Dunblane was formed by survivors of the massacre at Dunblane Primary School, with Mark Knopfler of Dire Straits playing guitar on the track. Scottish musician Ted Christopher wrote an extra new verse to "Knockin' on Heaven's Door" honouring the tragedy.

=== Songs from films ===
Original songs from various films entered the top 10 throughout the year. These included "The X-Files" (from The X-Files), "Theme from Mission: Impossible" (Mission: Impossible), "Born Slippy .NUXX" (Trainspotting), "Woman" (The Long Kiss Goodnight), "You Must Love Me" and "Don't Cry for Me Argentina" (Evita) and "What's Love Got to Do with It" (Police Story 3: Super Cop).

=== Charity singles ===
In the aftermath of the Dunblane massacre, a school shooting in Dunblane, Scotland which claimed the lives of sixteen children and their teacher, surviving students and teachers recorded a tribute single, which included a cover of "Knockin' on Heaven's Door" (which included an extra verse specially written by Ted Christopher) and a new song "Throw These Guns Away". It peaked at number-one on 21 December 1996 (week ending) for a single week.

=== Best-selling singles ===
Fugees had the best-selling single of the year with their cover of "Killing Me Softly", which spent eleven weeks in the top 10 (including five weeks at number-one), sold over 1.3 million copies and was certified 2× platinum by the BPI. "Wannabe" by Spice Girls came in second place. Babylon Zoo's "Spaceman", "Say You'll Be There" and "2 Become 1", both by Spice Girls, made up the top five. Songs by Mark Morrison, Baddiel, Skinner & The Lightning Seeds, Gina G, Robert Miles and Peter Andre featuring Bubbler Ranx were also in the top ten best-selling singles of the year.

== Top-ten singles ==
Key

| Symbol | Meaning |
|---|---|
| ‡ | Single peaked in 1995 but still in chart in 1996. |
| ♦ | Single released in 1996 but peaked in 1997. |
| (#) | Year-end top-ten single position and rank |
| Entered | The date that the single first appeared in the chart. |
| Peak | Highest position that the single reached in the UK Singles Chart. |

| Entered (week ending) | Weeks in top 10 | Single | Artist | Peak | Peak reached (week ending) | Weeks at peak |
Singles in 1995
| 28 October 1995 | 12 | "Gangsta's Paradise" ‡ | Coolio featuring L.V. | 1 | 28 October 1995 | 2 |
| 28 October 1995 | 14 | "Missing (Todd Terry Remix)" ‡ ^{[A]} | Everything but the Girl | 3 | 25 November 1995 | 2 |
| 11 November 1995 | 9 | "I Believe"/"Up on the Roof" ‡ | Robson & Jerome | 1 | 11 November 1995 | 4 |
| 11 November 1995 | 11 | "Wonderwall" ‡ | Oasis | 2 | 11 November 1995 | 1 |
| 25 November 1995 | 10 | "Father and Son" ‡ | Boyzone | 2 | 23 December 1995 | 2 |
| 25 November 1995 | 8 | "It's Oh So Quiet" ‡ | Björk | 4 | 23 December 1995 | 3 |
| 9 December 1995 | 9 | "Earth Song" ‡ | Michael Jackson | 1 | 9 December 1995 | 6 |
| 30 December 1995 | 2 | "Wonderwall" ‡ | The Mike Flowers Pops | 2 | 30 December 1995 | 1 |
| 30 December 1995 | 3 | "I Am Blessed" | Eternal | 7 | 13 January 1996 | 1 |
Singles in 1996
| 6 January 1996 | 2 | "If You Wanna Party" | Molella featuring The Outhere Brothers | 9 | 13 January 1996 | 1 |
| 13 January 1996 | 3 | "So Pure" | Baby D | 3 | 13 January 1996 | 1 |
| 13 January 1996 | 1 | "Creep '96" | TLC | 6 | 13 January 1996 | 1 |
| 20 January 1996 | 4 | "Jesus to a Child" | George Michael | 1 | 20 January 1996 | 1 |
| 20 January 1996 | 4 | "One by One" | Cher | 7 | 20 January 1996 | 2 |
| 20 January 1996 | 1 | "Sandstorm" | Cast | 8 | 20 January 1996 | 1 |
| 20 January 1996 | 1 | "Too Hot" | Coolio | 9 | 20 January 1996 | 1 |
| 27 January 1996 | 6 | "Spaceman" (#3) | Babylon Zoo | 1 | 27 January 1996 | 5 |
| 27 January 1996 | 2 | "Whole Lotta Love" | Goldbug | 3 | 27 January 1996 | 1 |
| 27 January 1996 | 7 | "Anything" | 3T | 2 | 10 February 1996 | 3 |
| 3 February 1996 | 3 | "Slight Return" | The Bluetones | 2 | 3 February 1996 | 1 |
| 3 February 1996 | 1 | "Street Spirit (Fade Out)" | Radiohead | 5 | 3 February 1996 | 1 |
| 3 February 1996 | 1 | "Not a Dry Eye in the House" | Meat Loaf | 7 | 3 February 1996 | 1 |
| 3 February 1996 | 1 | "No Fronts - The Remixes" | Dog Eat Dog | 9 | 3 February 1996 | 1 |
| 10 February 1996 | 2 | "Lifted" ^{[B]} | Lighthouse Family | 4 | 10 February 1996 | 1 |
| 10 February 1996 | 3 | "I Just Want to Make Love to You" | Etta James | 5 | 10 February 1996 | 1 |
| 10 February 1996 | 3 | "One of Us" | Joan Osborne | 6 | 10 February 1996 | 2 |
| 10 February 1996 | 2 | "Do U Still?" | East 17 | 7 | 10 February 1996 | 1 |
| 10 February 1996 | 6 | "I Wanna Be a Hippy" | Technohead | 6 | 2 March 1996 | 1 |
| 17 February 1996 | 4 | "I Got 5 on It" | Luniz | 3 | 17 February 1996 | 1 |
| 17 February 1996 | 1 | "Open Arms" | Mariah Carey | 4 | 17 February 1996 | 1 |
| 24 February 1996 | 10 | "Children" (#9) | Robert Miles | 2 | 2 March 1996 | 3 |
| 24 February 1996 | 1 | "Stereotypes" | Blur | 7 | 24 February 1996 | 1 |
| 24 February 1996 | 1 | "Hyperballad" | Björk | 8 | 24 February 1996 | 1 |
| 2 March 1996 | 5 | "Don't Look Back in Anger" | Oasis | 1 | 2 March 1996 | 1 |
| 2 March 1996 | 1 | "Perseverance" | Terrorvision | 5 | 2 March 1996 | 1 |
| 2 March 1996 | 1 | "Disco's Revenge" | Gusto | 9 | 2 March 1996 | 1 |
| 2 March 1996 | 1 | "Falling into You" | Celine Dion | 10 | 2 March 1996 | 1 |
| 9 March 1996 | 6 | "How Deep is Your Love" | Take That | 1 | 9 March 1996 | 3 |
| 9 March 1996 | 3 | "Coming Home Now" | Boyzone | 4 | 9 March 1996 | 1 |
| 9 March 1996 | 1 | "Going Out" | Supergrass | 5 | 9 March 1996 | 1 |
| 9 March 1996 | 2 | "Passion (Remix)" ^{[C]} | Gat Decor | 6 | 9 March 1996 | 1 |
| 9 March 1996 | 1 | "Good Thing" | Eternal | 8 | 9 March 1996 | 1 |
| 16 March 1996 | 2 | "Real Love" ^{[D]} | The Beatles | 4 | 16 March 1996 | 1 |
| 16 March 1996 | 12 | "Return of the Mack" (#6) | Mark Morrison | 1 | 20 April 1996 | 2 |
| 16 March 1996 | 1 | "These Days" | Bon Jovi | 7 | 16 March 1996 | 1 |
| 23 March 1996 | 2 | "Stupid Girl" | Garbage | 4 | 23 March 1996 | 1 |
| 23 March 1996 | 5 | "Give Me a Little More Time" | Gabrielle | 5 | 23 March 1996 | 3 |
| 23 March 1996 | 1 | "Going for Gold" | Shed Seven | 8 | 23 March 1996 | 1 |
| 23 March 1996 | 1 | "Being Brave" | Menswear | 10 | 23 March 1996 | 1 |
| 30 March 1996 | 5 | "Firestarter" | The Prodigy | 1 | 30 March 1996 | 3 |
| 30 March 1996 | 5 | "The X-Files" | Mark Snow | 2 | 30 March 1996 | 3 |
| 30 March 1996 | 1 | "Nakasaki (EP)" | Ken Doh | 7 | 30 March 1996 | 1 |
| 30 March 1996 | 1 | "Walkaway" | Cast | 9 | 30 March 1996 | 1 |
| 6 April 1996 | 10 | "Ooh Aah... Just a Little Bit" (#8) ^{[E]} | Gina G | 1 | 25 May 1996 | 1 |
| 6 April 1996 | 1 | "You've Got It Bad" | Ocean Colour Scene | 7 | 6 April 1996 | 1 |
| 6 April 1996 | 2 | "X-Files" | DJ Dado | 8 | 6 April 1996 | 1 |
| 6 April 1996 | 1 | "Something Changed" | Pulp | 10 | 6 April 1996 | 1 |
| 13 April 1996 | 1 | "California Love" | 2Pac featuring Dr. Dre and Roger | 6 | 13 April 1996 | 1 |
| 13 April 1996 | 1 | "Bulls on Parade" | Rage Against the Machine | 8 | 13 April 1996 | 1 |
| 20 April 1996 | 3 | "They Don't Care About Us" | Michael Jackson | 4 | 20 April 1996 | 2 |
| 20 April 1996 | 1 | "Walking Wounded" | Everything but the Girl | 6 | 20 April 1996 | 1 |
| 20 April 1996 | 1 | "Peaches" | The Presidents of the United States of America | 8 | 20 April 1996 | 1 |
| 20 April 1996 | 6 | "Cecilia" | Suggs featuring Louchie Lou & Michie One | 4 | 11 May 1996 | 1 |
| 27 April 1996 | 3 | "A Design for Life" | Manic Street Preachers | 2 | 27 April 1996 | 1 |
| 27 April 1996 | 1 | "Goldfinger" | Ash | 5 | 27 April 1996 | 1 |
| 27 April 1996 | 2 | "Keep on Jumpin'" | Lisa Marie Experience | 7 | 27 April 1996 | 1 |
| 4 May 1996 | 6 | "Fastlove" | George Michael | 1 | 4 May 1996 | 3 |
| 4 May 1996 | 1 | "Before" | Pet Shop Boys | 7 | 4 May 1996 | 1 |
| 4 May 1996 | 4 | "Move Move Move (The Red Tribe)" ^{[F]} | The Manchester United FA Cup Squad 1996 | 6 | 11 May 1996 | 2 |
| 4 May 1996 | 1 | "Sale of the Century" | Sleeper | 10 | 4 May 1996 | 1 |
| 11 May 1996 | 2 | "Charmless Man" | Blur | 5 | 11 May 1996 | 1 |
| 11 May 1996 | 1 | "Cut Some Rug"/"Castle Rock" | The Bluetones | 7 | 11 May 1996 | 1 |
| 11 May 1996 | 1 | "Woo-Hah!! Got You All in Check" | Busta Rhymes | 8 | 11 May 1996 | 1 |
| 11 May 1996 | 1 | "Klubbhopping" | Klubbheads | 10 | 11 May 1996 | 1 |
| 18 May 1996 | 1 | "Pass & Move (It's the Liverpool Groove)" ^{[G]} | Liverpool F.C. & Boot Room Boyz | 4 | 18 May 1996 | 1 |
| 18 May 1996 | 4 | "There's Nothing I Won't Do" | JX | 4 | 25 May 1996 | 1 |
| 18 May 1996 | 2 | "Tonight, Tonight" | The Smashing Pumpkins | 7 | 25 May 1996 | 1 |
| 18 May 1996 | 6 | "Nobody Knows" | Tony Rich Project | 4 | 1 June 1996 | 1 |
| 25 May 1996 | 1 | "Blue Moon"/"Only You" | John Alford | 9 | 25 May 1996 | 1 |
| 25 May 1996 | 1 | "Fat Neck" | Black Grape | 10 | 25 May 1996 | 1 |
| 1 June 1996 | 9 | "Three Lions" (#7) ^{[H]}^{[I]} | Baddiel, Skinner & The Lightning Seeds | 1 | 1 June 1996 | 2 |
| 1 June 1996 | 11 | "Mysterious Girl" (#10) | Peter Andre featuring Bubbler Ranx | 2 | 22 June 1996 | 1 |
| 1 June 1996 | 1 | "Until It Sleeps" | Metallica | 5 | 1 June 1996 | 1 |
| 1 June 1996 | 1 | "The Only Thing That Looks Good on Me Is You" | Bryan Adams | 6 | 1 June 1996 | 1 |
| 1 June 1996 | 8 | "Because You Loved Me" | Celine Dion | 5 | 22 June 1996 | 4 |
| 8 June 1996 | 11 | "Killing Me Softly" (#1) | Fugees | 1 | 8 June 1996 | 5 |
| 8 June 1996 | 2 | "Naked" | Louise | 5 | 8 June 1996 | 1 |
| 8 June 1996 | 2 | "Fable" | Robert Miles | 7 | 8 June 1996 | 1 |
| 15 June 1996 | 3 | "The Day We Caught the Train" | Ocean Colour Scene | 4 | 15 June 1996 | 1 |
| 15 June 1996 | 7 | "Don't Stop Movin'" | Livin' Joy | 5 | 15 June 1996 | 1 |
| 15 June 1996 | 2 | "Blurred" | Pianoman | 6 | 15 June 1996 | 1 |
| 15 June 1996 | 1 | "Theme from Mission: Impossible" | Adam Clayton & Larry Mullen Jr. | 7 | 15 June 1996 | 1 |
| 22 June 1996 | 3 | "Always Be My Baby" | Mariah Carey | 3 | 22 June 1996 | 1 |
| 22 June 1996 | 1 | "Make It With You" | Let Loose | 7 | 22 June 1996 | 1 |
| 29 June 1996 | 1 | "England's Irie" | Black Grape featuring Joe Strummer & Keith Allen | 6 | 29 June 1996 | 1 |
| 29 June 1996 | 1 | "Wrong" | Everything but the Girl | 8 | 29 June 1996 | 1 |
| 29 June 1996 | 1 | "Let Me Live" | Queen | 9 | 29 June 1996 | 1 |
| 6 July 1996 | 1 | "Tattva" | Kula Shaker | 4 | 6 July 1996 | 1 |
| 6 July 1996 | 1 | "Oh Yeah" | Ash | 6 | 6 July 1996 | 1 |
| 6 July 1996 | 1 | "Jazz It Up" | Reel 2 Real | 7 | 6 July 1996 | 1 |
| 6 July 1996 | 1 | "Where Love Lives '96" ^{[J]} | Alison Limerick | 9 | 6 July 1996 | 1 |
| 13 July 1996 | 6 | "Born Slippy Nuxx" | Underworld | 2 | 13 July 1996 | 1 |
| 13 July 1996 | 1 | "In Too Deep" | Belinda Carlisle | 6 | 13 July 1996 | 1 |
| 13 July 1996 | 2 | "You're Makin' Me High" | Toni Braxton | 7 | 13 July 1996 | 1 |
| 13 July 1996 | 1 | "Keep on Jumpin'" | Todd Terry presents Martha Wash & Jocelyn Brown | 8 | 13 July 1996 | 1 |
| 13 July 1996 | 1 | "Nice Guy Eddie" | Sleeper | 10 | 13 July 1996 | 1 |
| 20 July 1996 | 3 | "Forever Love" | Gary Barlow | 1 | 20 July 1996 | 1 |
| 20 July 1996 | 12 | "Wannabe" (#2) | Spice Girls | 1 | 27 July 1996 | 7 |
| 20 July 1996 | 1 | "Bad Actress" | Terrorvision | 10 | 20 July 1996 | 1 |
| 27 July 1996 | 2 | "Crazy" ^{[K]} | Mark Morrison | 6 | 27 July 1996 | 1 |
| 27 July 1996 | 3 | "Higher State of Consciousness '96 (Remixes)" ^{[L]} | Wink | 7 | 27 July 1996 | 1 |
| 27 July 1996 | 8 | "Macarena" ^{[M]} | Los del Rio | 2 | 17 August 1996 | 1 |
| 3 August 1996 | 1 | "Everything Must Go" | Manic Street Preachers | 5 | 3 August 1996 | 1 |
| 3 August 1996 | 1 | "Head over Feet" | Alanis Morissette | 7 | 3 August 1996 | 1 |
| 3 August 1996 | 1 | "Woman" | Neneh Cherry | 9 | 3 August 1996 | 1 |
| 10 August 1996 | 2 | "Freedom" | Robbie Williams | 2 | 10 August 1996 | 1 |
| 10 August 1996 | 1 | "Trash" | Suede | 3 | 10 August 1996 | 1 |
| 10 August 1996 | 3 | "Good Enough" | Dodgy | 4 | 10 August 1996 | 1 |
| 10 August 1996 | 3 | "Tha Crossroads" | Bone Thugs-N-Harmony | 8 | 10 August 1996 | 1 |
| 17 August 1996 | 2 | "Someday" ^{[N]} | Eternal | 4 | 17 August 1996 | 1 |
| 17 August 1996 | 1 | "Peacock Suit" | Paul Weller | 5 | 17 August 1996 | 1 |
| 17 August 1996 | 6 | "How Bizarre" | OMC | 5 | 24 August 1996 | 1 |
| 24 August 1996 | 2 | "Why" | 3T featuring Michael Jackson | 2 | 24 August 1996 | 1 |
| 24 August 1996 | 3 | "We've Got It Goin' On" ^{[O]} | Backstreet Boys | 3 | 24 August 1996 | 1 |
| 24 August 1996 | 1 | "Se a vida é (That's the Way Life Is)" | Pet Shop Boys | 8 | 24 August 1996 | 1 |
| 24 August 1996 | 1 | "Better Watch Out" | Ant & Dec | 10 | 24 August 1996 | 1 |
| 31 August 1996 | 2 | "Spinning the Wheel" | George Michael | 2 | 31 August 1996 | 1 |
| 31 August 1996 | 4 | "Virtual Insanity" | Jamiroquai | 3 | 31 August 1996 | 1 |
| 31 August 1996 | 1 | "E-Bow the Letter" | R.E.M. | 4 | 31 August 1996 | 1 |
| 31 August 1996 | 1 | "Undivided Love" | Louise | 5 | 31 August 1996 | 1 |
| 31 August 1996 | 1 | "Let's Make a Night to Remember" | Bryan Adams | 10 | 31 August 1996 | 1 |
| 7 September 1996 | 2 | "Hey Dude" | Kula Shaker | 2 | 7 September 1996 | 1 |
| 7 September 1996 | 2 | "One to Another" | The Charlatans | 3 | 7 September 1996 | 1 |
| 7 September 1996 | 3 | "I've Got a Little Puppy" | The Smurfs | 4 | 7 September 1996 | 2 |
| 7 September 1996 | 1 | "Me and You Versus the World" | Space | 9 | 7 September 1996 | 1 |
| 14 September 1996 | 4 | "Flava" | Peter Andre | 1 | 14 September 1996 | 1 |
| 14 September 1996 | 5 | "Ready or Not" | Fugees | 1 | 21 September 1996 | 2 |
| 14 September 1996 | 3 | "I'm Alive" | Stretch & Vern present Maddog | 6 | 14 September 1996 | 2 |
| 21 September 1996 | 6 | "Breakfast at Tiffany's" | Deep Blue Something | 1 | 5 October 1996 | 1 |
| 21 September 1996 | 1 | "Always Breaking My Heart" | Belinda Carlisle | 8 | 21 September 1996 | 1 |
| 21 September 1996 | 1 | "If It Makes You Happy" | Sheryl Crow | 9 | 21 September 1996 | 1 |
| 28 September 1996 | 3 | "Escaping" | Dina Carroll | 3 | 28 September 1996 | 1 |
| 28 September 1996 | 4 | "Seven Days and One Week" | B.B.E. | 3 | 5 October 1996 | 1 |
| 28 September 1996 | 1 | "The Circle" | Ocean Colour Scene | 6 | 28 September 1996 | 1 |
| 28 September 1996 | 1 | "Marblehead Johnson" | The Bluetones | 7 | 28 September 1996 | 1 |
| 28 September 1996 | 5 | "I Love You Always Forever" | Donna Lewis | 5 | 5 October 1996 | 2 |
| 5 October 1996 | 5 | "It's All Coming Back to Me Now" | Celine Dion | 3 | 19 October 1996 | 1 |
| 5 October 1996 | 1 | "Loungin" | LL Cool J | 7 | 5 October 1996 | 1 |
| 5 October 1996 | 1 | "Dance into the Light" | Phil Collins | 9 | 5 October 1996 | 1 |
| 12 October 1996 | 2 | "Setting Sun" | The Chemical Brothers | 1 | 12 October 1996 | 1 |
| 12 October 1996 | 6 | "You're Gorgeous" | Babybird | 3 | 12 October 1996 | 1 |
| 12 October 1996 | 3 | "Rotterdam" | The Beautiful South | 5 | 19 October 1996 | 1 |
| 12 October 1996 | 1 | "Kevin Carter" | Manic Street Preachers | 9 | 12 October 1996 | 1 |
| 19 October 1996 | 4 | "Words" | Boyzone | 1 | 19 October 1996 | 1 |
| 19 October 1996 | 1 | "Trippin'" | Mark Morrison | 8 | 19 October 1996 | 1 |
| 19 October 1996 | 1 | "No Diggity" | Blackstreet featuring Dr. Dre | 9 | 19 October 1996 | 1 |
| 26 October 1996 | 5 | "Say You'll Be There" (#4) | Spice Girls | 1 | 26 October 1996 | 2 |
| 26 October 1996 | 3 | "Insomnia" | Faithless | 3 | 26 October 1996 | 1 |
| 26 October 1996 | 1 | "Flying" | Cast | 4 | 26 October 1996 | 1 |
| 26 October 1996 | 1 | "Beautiful Ones" | Suede | 8 | 26 October 1996 | 1 |
| 2 November 1996 | 6 | "If You Ever" | East 17 featuring Gabrielle | 2 | 2 November 1996 | 1 |
| 2 November 1996 | 12 | "Un-Break My Heart" | Toni Braxton | 2 | 21 December 1996 | 2 |
| 2 November 1996 | 1 | "Place Your Hands" | Reef | 6 | 2 November 1996 | 1 |
| 2 November 1996 | 1 | "Follow the Rules" | Livin' Joy | 9 | 2 November 1996 | 1 |
| 2 November 1996 | 1 | "You Must Love Me" | Madonna | 10 | 2 November 1996 | 1 |
| 9 November 1996 | 4 | "What Becomes of the Brokenhearted"/"Saturday Night at the Movies"/"You'll Never Walk Alone" | Robson & Jerome | 1 | 9 November 1996 | 2 |
| 9 November 1996 | 1 | "Angel" | Simply Red | 4 | 9 November 1996 | 1 |
| 9 November 1996 | 2 | "I Belong to You" | Gina G | 6 | 9 November 1996 | 1 |
| 9 November 1996 | 1 | "Don't Make Me Wait" | 911 | 10 | 9 November 1996 | 1 |
| 16 November 1996 | 1 | "Stranger in Moscow" | Michael Jackson | 4 | 16 November 1996 | 1 |
| 16 November 1996 | 9 | "One and One" | Robert Miles featuring Maria Nayler | 3 | 21 December 1996 | 1 |
| 16 November 1996 | 4 | "Hillbilly Rock Hillbilly Roll" ^{[P]} | The Woolpackers | 5 | 23 November 1996 | 1 |
| 16 November 1996 | 1 | "I'll Never Break Your Heart" | Backstreet Boys | 8 | 16 November 1996 | 1 |
| 23 November 1996 | 8 | "Breathe" | The Prodigy | 1 | 23 November 1996 | 2 |
| 23 November 1996 | 3 | "What's Love Got to Do with It" | Warren G featuring Adina Howard | 2 | 23 November 1996 | 1 |
| 23 November 1996 | 1 | "Govinda" | Kula Shaker | 7 | 23 November 1996 | 1 |
| 23 November 1996 | 1 | "Milk" | Garbage featuring Tricky | 10 | 23 November 1996 | 1 |
| 30 November 1996 | 2 | "No Woman, No Cry" | Fugees | 2 | 30 November 1996 | 1 |
| 30 November 1996 | 1 | "Child" | Mark Owen | 3 | 30 November 1996 | 1 |
| 30 November 1996 | 1 | "One Kiss from Heaven" | Louise | 9 | 30 November 1996 | 1 |
| 7 December 1996 | 2 | "I Feel You" | Peter Andre | 1 | 7 December 1996 | 1 |
| 7 December 1996 | 2 | "I Need You" | 3T | 3 | 7 December 1996 | 1 |
| 7 December 1996 | 1 | "Cosmic Girl" | Jamiroquai | 6 | 7 December 1996 | 1 |
| 7 December 1996 | 1 | "Secrets" | Eternal | 9 | 7 December 1996 | 1 |
| 14 December 1996 | 4 | "A Different Beat" | Boyzone | 1 | 14 December 1996 | 1 |
| 14 December 1996 | 2 | "Forever" | Damage | 6 | 14 December 1996 | 1 |
| 14 December 1996 | 1 | "Australia" | Manic Street Preachers | 7 | 14 December 1996 | 1 |
| 14 December 1996 | 2 | "Don't Marry Her" ^{[Q]} | The Beautiful South | 8 | 14 December 1996 | 1 |
| 14 December 1996 | 1 | "Live Like Horses" | Elton John & Luciano Pavarotti | 9 | 14 December 1996 | 1 |
| 21 December 1996 | 3 | "Knockin' on Heaven's Door"/"Throw These Guns Away" | Dunblane | 1 | 21 December 1996 | 1 |
| 21 December 1996 | 4 | "Horny" | Mark Morrison | 5 | 21 December 1996 | 1 |
| 21 December 1996 | 3 | "All by Myself" | Celine Dion | 6 | 21 December 1996 | 1 |
| 21 December 1996 | 1 | "Your Christmas Wish" | The Smurfs | 8 | 21 December 1996 | 1 |
| 21 December 1996 | 1 | "Salva Mea" | Faithless | 9 | 21 December 1996 | 1 |
| 28 December 1996 | 4 | "2 Become 1" (#5) | Spice Girls | 1 | 28 December 1996 | 3 |
| 28 December 1996 | 5 | "Don't Cry for Me Argentina" | Madonna | 3 | 28 December 1996 | 1 |

== Entries by artist ==
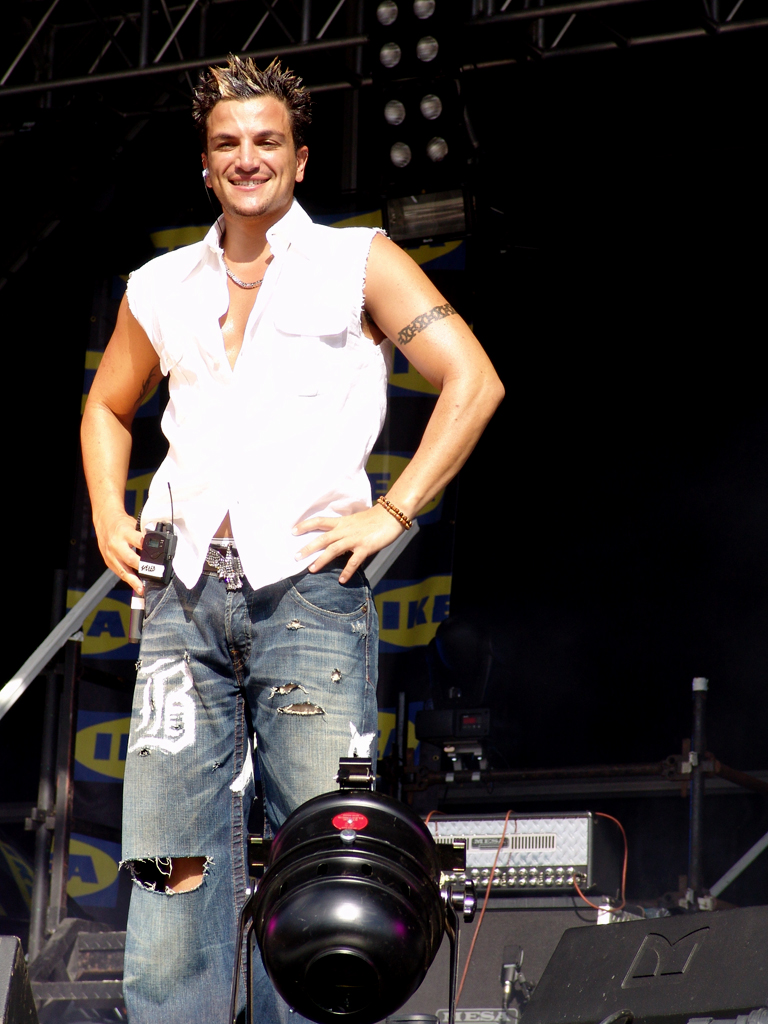
Peter Andre had a total of three UK top 10 hits this year, including the number-ones "Flava" and "I Feel You". "Mysterious Girl", which features Jamaican singer and rapper Bubbler Ranx, reached number two upon its initial release this year and would ultimately peak at number-one when it was re-released in 2004.

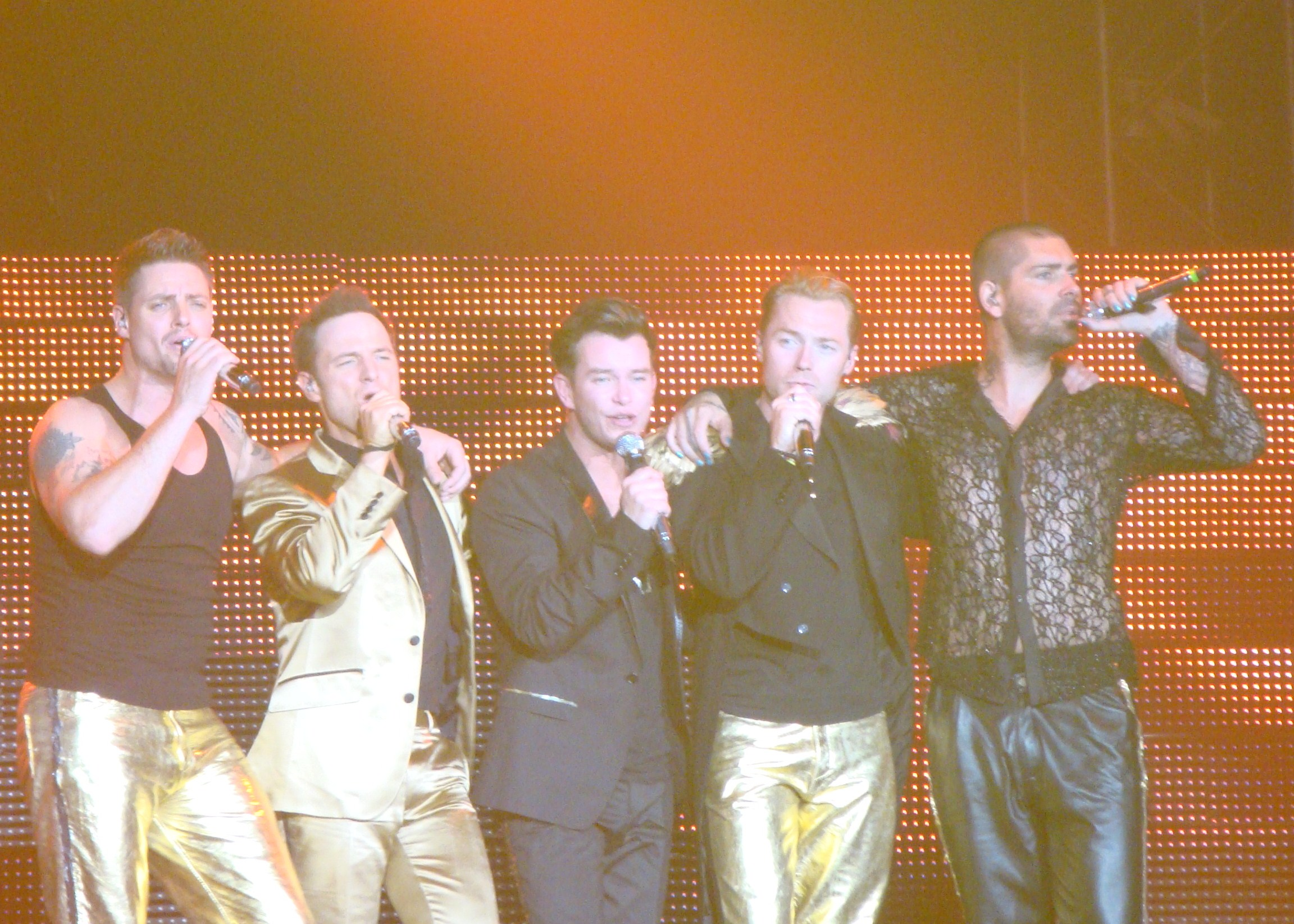
Irish boy band Boyzone (pictured in 2009) had four top 10 singles in 1996, including the number-one hits "Words" and "A Different Beat".

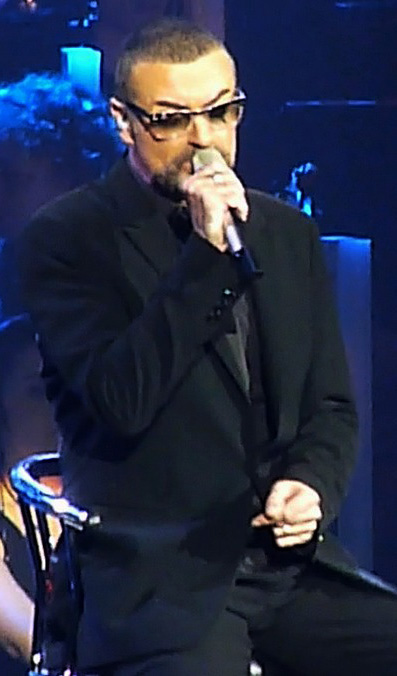
George Michael (pictured in 2011) had a total of three top 10 entries this year, including the number-one singles "Jesus to a Child" and "Fastlove".

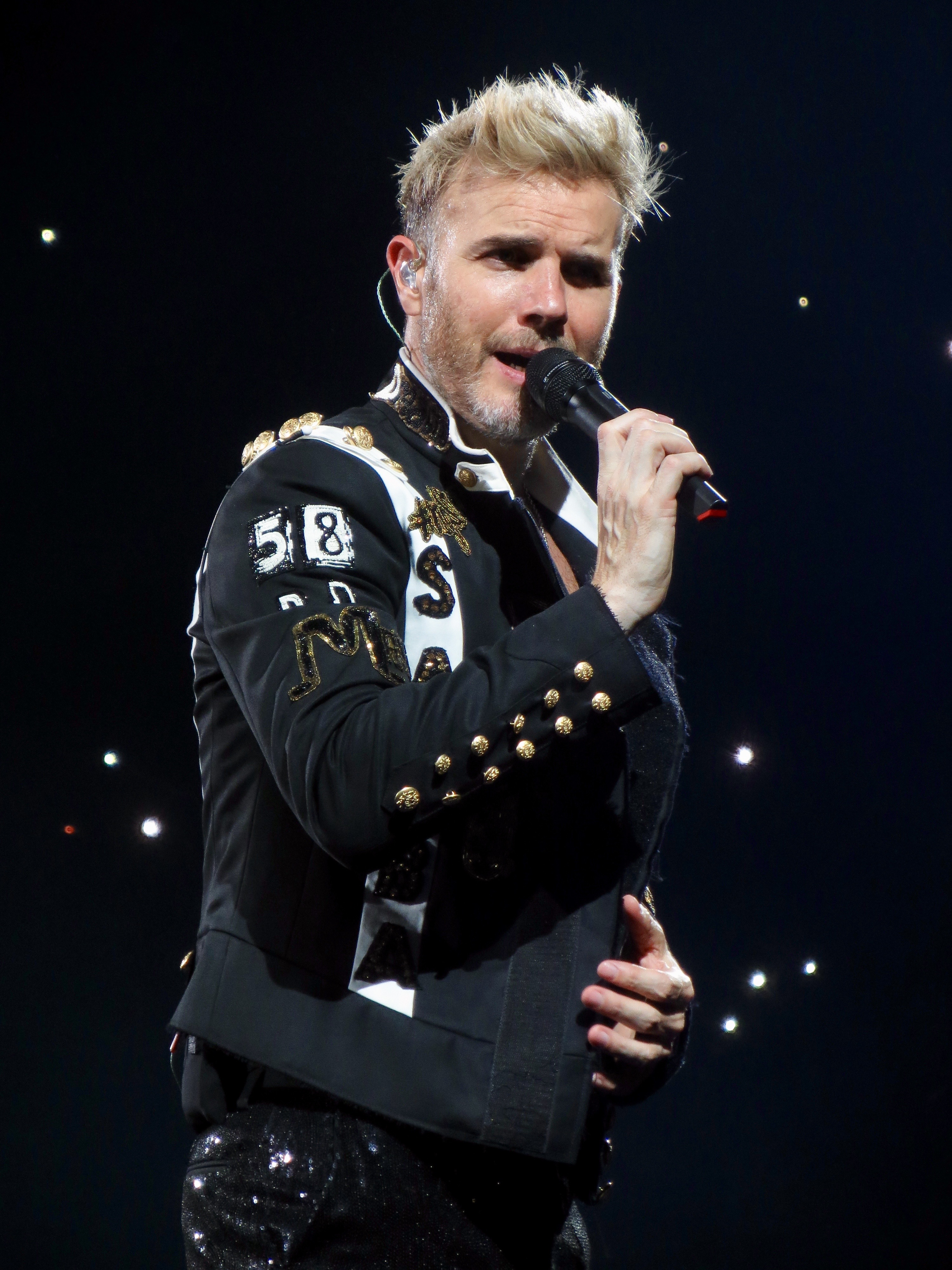
Following the break-up of Take That in 1996, Gary Barlow (pictured in 2017) went straight to number-one in the UK with his debut solo single "Forever Love". Take That's final single release prior to their initial split was their cover version of the Bee Gees song "How Deep is Your Love", which topped the chart for three weeks in March.

The following table shows artists who achieved two or more top 10 entries in 1996, including songs that reached their peak in 1995. The figures include both main artists and featured artists, while appearances on ensemble charity records are also counted for each artist.

| Entries | Artist | Weeks | Singles |
|---|---|---|---|
| 4 | Boyzone ^{[R]} | 14 | "A Different Beat", "Coming Home Now", "Father and Son", "Words" |
| 4 | Celine Dion | 16 | "All by Myself", "Because You Loved Me", "Falling into You", "It's All Coming Back to Me Now" |
| 4 | Eternal ^{[S]} | 6 | "Good Thing", "I Am Blessed", "Secrets", "Someday" |
| 4 | Manic Street Preachers | 6 | "A Design for Life", "Australia", "Everything Must Go", "Kevin Carter" |
| 4 | Mark Morrison | 17 | "Crazy", "Horny", "Return of the Mack", "Trippin'" |
| 4 | Michael Jackson ^{[R]}^{[T]} | 11 | "Earth Song", "Stranger in Moscow", "They Don't Care About Us", "Why" |
| 3 | 3T | 11 | "Anything", "I Need You", "Why" |
| 3 | The Bluetones | 5 | "Cut Some Rug"/"Castle Rock", "Marblehead Johnson", "Slight Return" |
| 3 | Cast | 3 | "Flying", "Sandstorm", "Walkaway" |
| 3 | Everything but the Girl ^{[R]} | 6 | "Missing (Todd Terry Club Mix)", "Walking Wounded", "Wrong" |
| 3 | Fugees | 18 | "Killing Me Softly", "No Woman, No Cry", "Ready or Not" |
| 3 | George Michael | 12 | "Fastlove", "Jesus to a Child", "Spinning the Wheel" |
| 3 | Kula Shaker | 4 | "Govinda", "Hey Dude", "Tattva" |
| 3 | Louise | 4 | "Naked", "One Kiss from Heaven", "Undivided Love" |
| 3 | Ocean Colour Scene | 5 | "The Circle", "The Day We Caught the Train", "You've Got It Bad" |
| 3 | Peter Andre | 17 | "Flava", "I Feel You", "Mysterious Girl" |
| 3 | Robert Miles | 19 | "Children", "Fable", "One and One" |
| 3 | Spice Girls | 18 | "2 Become 1", "Say You'll Be There", "Wannabe" |
| 2 | Ash | 2 | "Goldfinger", "Oh Yeah" |
| 2 | Backstreet Boys | 4 | "I'll Never Break Your Heart", "We've Got It Goin' On" |
| 2 | The Beautiful South | 5 | "Don't Marry Her", "Rotterdam" |
| 2 | Belinda Carlisle | 2 | "Always Breaking My Heart", "In Too Deep" |
| 2 | Björk ^{[R]} | 2 | "Hyperballad", "It's Oh So Quiet" |
| 2 | Black Grape | 2 | "England's Irie", "Fat Neck" |
| 2 | Blur | 3 | "Charmless Man", "Stereotypes" |
| 2 | Bryan Adams | 2 | "Let's Make a Night to Remember", "The Only Thing That Looks Good on Me Is You" |
| 2 | Coolio ^{[R]} | 3 | "Gangsta's Paradise", "Too Hot" |
| 2 | Dr. Dre ^{[U]}^{[V]} | 2 | "California Love", "No Diggity" |
| 2 | East 17 | 8 | "Do U Still?", "If You Ever" |
| 2 | Faithless | 4 | "Insomnia", "Salva Mea" |
| 2 | Gabrielle ^{[W]} | 11 | "Give Me a Little More Time", "If You Ever" |
| 2 | Garbage | 3 | "Milk", "Stupid Girl" |
| 2 | Gary Barlow ^{[X]} | | "Forever Love", "How Deep Is Your Love" |
| 2 | Gina G | 12 | "I Belong to You", "Ooh Aah... Just a Little Bit" |
| 2 | Jamiroquai | 5 | "Cosmic Girl", "Virtual Insanity" |
| 2 | Livin' Joy | 8 | "Don't Stop Movin'", "Follow the Rules" |
| 2 | Madonna | 2 | "Don't Cry for Me Argentina", "You Must Love Me" |
| 2 | Mariah Carey | 4 | "Always Be My Baby", "Open Arms" |
| 2 | Mark Owen ^{[X]} | 7 | "Child", "How Deep Is Your Love" |
| 2 | Oasis ^{[R]} | 8 | "Don't Look Back in Anger", "Wonderwall" |
| 2 | Pet Shop Boys | 2 | "Before", "Se a vida é (That's the Way Life Is)" |
| 2 | The Prodigy | 11 | "Breathe", "Firestarter" |
| 2 | Robson & Jerome ^{[R]} | 5 | "I Believe"/"Up on the Roof", "What Becomes of the Brokenhearted"/"Saturday Night at the Movies"/"You'll Never Walk Alone" |
| 2 | Sleeper | 2 | "Nice Guy Eddie", "Sale of the Century" |
| 2 | The Smurfs | 4 | "I've Got a Little Puppy", "Your Christmas Wish" |
| 2 | Suede | 2 | "Beautiful Ones", "Trash" |
| 2 | Terrorvision | 2 | "Bad Actress", "Perseverance" |
| 2 | Toni Braxton | 10 | "Un-Break My Heart", "You're Makin' Me High" |

== Notes ==
- ^{a} "Missing" originally peaked outside the top ten at number 69 upon its initial release in 1994.
- ^{b} "Lifted" originally peaked outside the top ten at number 61 upon its initial release in May 1995.
- ^{c} The original version of "Passion" peaked outside the top ten at number 29 upon its release in 1992.
- ^{d} "Real Love" was written by John Lennon before his death in 1980. It was recorded by Paul McCartney, George Harrison and Ringo Starr in 1995 and was the last original song by the band to chart.
- ^{e} "Ooh Aah... Just a Little Bit" was the United Kingdom's entry at the Eurovision Song Contest in 1996.
- ^{f} "Move Move Move (The Red Tribe)" was released by Manchester United F.C. to celebrate reaching the FA Cup Final in 1996.
- ^{g} "Pass & Move (It's the Liverpool Groove)" was released by Liverpool F.C. and Boot Room Boyz to celebrate reaching the FA Cup Final in 1996.
- ^{h} "Three Lions" was released as the official single to support the England football team's participation in UEFA Euro 96.
- ^{i} "Three Lions" spent one week at number one on 1 June 1996 (week ending) and returned to the top spot on 6 July 1996 (week ending) when England reached the semi-finals of Euro 96.
- ^{j} "Where Love Lives" originally peaked outside the top ten at number 87 upon its initial release in 1990.
- ^{k} "Crazy" originally peaked outside the top ten at number 19 upon its initial release in April 1995.
- ^{l} "Higher State of Consciousness" was re-released in 1996 as a single containing remixes by various DJs and producers. The remixed version was credited to Wink rather Josh Wink.
- ^{m} Spanish dance song Macarena was named by VH1 in the 2002 documentary series 100 Greatest One-Hit Wonders as the best one-hit wonder of all time.
- ^{n} Eternal recorded a version of the song "Someday" from the Disney film The Hunchback of Notre Dame which was used on the end credits of the VHS in the UK.
- ^{o} "We've Got It Goin' On" originally peaked outside the top ten at number 54 upon its initial release in October 1995.
- ^{p} "Hillbilly Rock Hillbilly Roll" re-entered the top 10 at number 10 on 4 January 1997 (week ending).
- ^{q} "Don't Marry Her" re-entered the top 10 at number 10 on 28 December 1996 (week ending).
- ^{r} Figure includes single that peaked in 1995.
- ^{s} Figure includes single that first charted in 1995 but peaked in 1996.
- ^{t} Figure includes appearance on 3T's "Why".
- ^{u} Figure includes appearance on 2Pac's "California Love".
- ^{v} Figure includes appearance on Blackstreet's "No Diggity".
- ^{w} Figure includes appearance on East 17's "If You Ever".
- ^{x} Figure includes a top 10 hit with the group Take That.

== See also ==
- 1996 in British music
- List of number-one singles from the 1990s (UK)
