= The Riverboat Song =

1996 single by Ocean Colour Scene

Single by Ocean Colour Scene

from the album Moseley Shoals
- B-side: "So Sad"; "Charlie Brown Says"
- Released: 5 February 1996
- Studio: Moseley Shoals (Birmingham, England)
- Length: 4:58
- Label: MCA
- Songwriter: Ocean Colour Scene
- Producers: Brendan Lynch; Ocean Colour Scene

Ocean Colour Scene singles chronology
"Do Yourself a Favour" (1992)	"The Riverboat Song" (1996)	"You've Got It Bad" (1996)

"The Riverboat Song" is a song by British band Ocean Colour Scene. It is heavily influenced by Led Zeppelin's "Four Sticks", from which it takes its main riff and a number of lyrics. The song is written in 6/4 time.

The single was popularised by Radio 1 DJ Chris Evans, who played it frequently on his radio shows and to introduce guests on his television programme TFI Friday. As a result, having been released in February 1996, it reached number 15 on the UK Singles Chart, paving the way for the success of the next two singles, "You've Got It Bad" and "The Day We Caught the Train", as well as their album Moseley Shoals. It also became a moderate hit in New Zealand, where it peaked at number 37.

== Track listings ==
UK and Japanese CD single

1. "The Riverboat Song"
2. "So Sad"
3. "Charlie Brown Says"

UK 7-inch and cassette single

1. "The Riverboat Song"
2. "So Sad"

== Credits and personnel ==
Credits are taken from the Moseley Shoals album booklet.

Studios

- Recorded and mixed at Moseley Shoals (Birmingham, England)
- Mastered at the Powerplant (London, England)

Personnel

- Ocean Colour Scene – writing, production
  - Simon Fowler – vocals, acoustic guitar
  - Steve Cradock – guitar, piano, vocals
  - Oscar Harrison – drums, piano, vocals
  - Damon Minchella – bass guitar
- Paul Weller – organ
- Brendan Lynch – production
- Martin Heyes – engineering
- Tony Keach – assistant engineering
- Tim Young – mastering

== Charts ==
Chart (1996)	Peak position
Europe (Eurochart Hot 100)	40
New Zealand (Recorded Music NZ)	37
Scotland Singles (OCC)	13
UK Singles (OCC)	15

== Certifications ==
Region	Certification	Certified units/sales
United Kingdom (BPI)	Gold	400,000^{‡}
^{‡} Sales+streaming figures based on certification alone.

== Release history ==
Region	Date	Format(s)	Label(s)	Ref.
United Kingdom	5 February 1996	7-inch vinyl; CD; cassette	MCA	
Japan	22 May 1996	CD	MCA	
