= The Kundalini Target =

Studio album by Steve Cradock
- Released: 9 February 2009
- Recorded: 2008
- Label: Moseley Shoals Records
- Producer: Steve Cradock

The Kundalini Target is the debut solo album from Ocean Colour Scene member and Paul Weller collaborator Steve Cradock released in February 2009. The album was recorded by Cradock at Paul Weller's Black Barn recording studio in Surrey with Cradock playing most of the instrumentation on the album with contributions from Paul Weller, backing vocals from Cradock's wife Sally together with additional production by former Talk Talk Bass player Paul Webb. Steve Cradock recently described the genesis of the album as thus: It started with me trying to write a song for my two kids. I wanted to write something that wasn’t too sweet or saccharine and I think I managed that. The album just kind of grew from there The art work was designed by Sally Cradock who also runs the record label and Kundalini Music

== Reception ==
Professional ratings
Review scores
Source	Rating
Allmusic	3.5/5 stars
musicOMH	1/5 stars
NME	(3/10)

== Track listing ==
All songs were written, produced and performed by Cradock, with the exception of 'Something Better' which was written by Gerry Goffin and Barry Mann.

1. Something Better
2. The Apple
3. Running Away
4. You Paint Your Picture
5. On and On
6. The Clothes They Stood Up In
7. Still Trying
8. It's Transcendental
9. Ask The Sound
10. Beware Of Falling Rocks
11. Kundalini's Target

== Additional personnel ==
- Paul Weller - additional vocals on "The Apple", "Beware Of Falling Rocks", "Still Trying" and 12 string guitar on "You Paint Your Picture"
- Hannah Andrews - backing vocals on "The Apple"
- Sally Cradock - backing vocals on "The Apple", "Running Away", "On and On" and "Beware Of Falling Rocks"

== Charts ==
Chart (2009)	Peak Position
UK Albums Chart	114
