= Saturday (Ocean Colour Scene album) =

Studio album by Ocean Colour Scene
- Released: 1 February 2010
- Recorded: Rockfield Studios, Rockfield, Monmouthshire
- Genres: Alternative rock, indie rock
- Label: Cooking Vinyl
- Producer: Gavin Monaghan

Ocean Colour Scene chronology
| On the Leyline (2007) | Saturday (2010) | Painting (2013) |

Professional ratings
Review scores
| Source | Rating |
|---|---|
| AllMusic | 4/5 stars |
| MusicOMH | 2/5 stars |
| PopMatters | 8/10 |
| The Skinny | 2/5 stars |

Saturday is the ninth studio album by Ocean Colour Scene and first album by the band to be released on the Cooking Vinyl independent record label. The album was produced by Gavin Monaghan, who is also known for his work with Editors, Scott Matthews, Nizlopi and The Twang and engineered by Gazz Rogers. Saturday previously had the working title of 'Blue Sky Drinking' which was changed to 'Rockfield' and again shortly before its release to its eventual name of 'Saturday'. The first single to be released from the album was 'Magic Carpet Days' as a digital download only single, the single failed to chart. Upon its release Saturday débuted and peaked at #35 in the Official UK Album Chart.

The song Harry Kidnap was written in tribute to John Weller, the deceased father of Paul Weller, and Steve Cradock contributes lead vocals to his own song composition 'Postal'.

The album was released on limited edition green vinyl for the first time as part of Record Store Day 2021.

== Track listing ==
All songs written by Simon Fowler, Steve Cradock and Oscar Harrison, unless otherwise noted.

1. "100 Floors of Perception"
2. "Mrs Maylie"
3. "Saturday" (Fowler, Cradock, Harrison, Sealey)
4. "Just a Little Bit of Love"
5. "Old Pair of Jeans" (Andy Bennett, Lee Burn)
6. "Sing Children Sing"
7. "Harry Kidnap" (Fowler, Cradock, Harrison, Sealey)
8. "Magic Carpet Days""
9. "The Word"
10. "Village Life"
11. "Postal"
12. "What's Mine Is Yours" (Sealey)
13. "Fell in Love on the Street Again"
14. "Rockfield"
15. "Over My Head" (iTunes Exclusive)

== Personnel ==
Ocean Colour Scene

- Simon Fowler – lead vocals (all but 11), backing vocals (all tracks), mandolin, cittern, piano, handclaps (tracks 2), percussion (tracks 2, 3), acoustic guitar (tracks 3–5, 6 and 12), tambourine (track 11)
- Steve Cradock – electric guitar, (all but 7, 10 and 12), acoustic guitar (all tracks but 6, 10, 12 and 13; including 12-string on 5), piano (tracks 3, 5, 7, 9 and 13), percussion (track 3), lap steel guitar (track 4, 10 and 13), electric piano (tracks 4 and 8) Mellotron (tracks 4, 5 and 7), handclaps (track 5), Hammond B3 organ (track 6 and 9), mandolin (tracks 7, 8, 9 and 10), cittern (track 7), Harpsichord (track 8), slide guitar (track 10), lead and backing vocals (track 11)
- Andy Bennett – electric guitar (track 2, 5, 11, 14) acoustic guitar (track 3, 4, 5, 6, 7, 8, 9), percussion (track 3), backing vocals, handclaps (track 5)
- Dan Sealey – bass (all tracks), backing vocals (track 2, 3, 4, 6, 9, 10, 11, 12), acoustic guitar, (track 6, 10, 12), bells (track 7), piano (track 8, 10, 12, 13), synthesizer (track 8), electric guitar, electric piano (track 12)
- Oscar Harrison – drums (all tracks but 13), percussion (all tracks but 10, 13), backing vocals (track 2), piano (tracks 4, 6, 9)

Additional personnel

- Gavin Monaghan – programming (all but 10 and 13), synthesizer (track 1, 2), string arrangement (track 1, 14), timpani (track 5), brass arrangement (track 6), orchestral arrangement (track 7), Tubular bells, glockenspiel, marimba (track 7), noises (track 8), tape echoes (track 10), effects (track 14)
- Louis Robinson And The Mighty Heartstrings Quartet – strings (track 1, 7, 14)
- Emma Skipp – backing vocals (track 3, 6, 12), Transcendent vocal (track 10),
- Kaytee De Wolfe – backing vocals (track 3, 6), vocals refrain (track 8)
- Mat Taylor And Brass Knuckles – tenor, baritone and alto saxophone, clarinet (track 3, 5, 6)
- Mat Taylor – flute, clarinet, oboe (track 7, 12)
- George Schilling – cello (track 9)
- Gareth Rogers – programming (track 11, 14)
