= You've Got It Bad =

1996 single by Ocean Colour Scene

Single by Ocean Colour Scene

from the album Moseley Shoals
- B-side: "Robin Hood"; "I Wanna Stay Alive with You"; "Huckleberry Grove"; "Here in My Heart"; "Men of Such Opinion"; "Beautiful Losers"
- Released: 25 March 1996
- Studio: Moseley Shoals (Birmingham, England)
- Length: 4:26
- Label: MCA
- Songwriter: Ocean Colour Scene
- Producers: Brendan Lynch; Ocean Colour Scene

Ocean Colour Scene singles chronology
"The Riverboat Song" (1996)	"You've Got It Bad" (1996)	"The Day We Caught the Train" (1996)

"You've Got It Bad" is a song by English rock band Ocean Colour Scene. The song was released as the second single from their second album, Moseley Shoals (1996), on 25 March 1996 and reached number seven on the UK Singles Chart. The single was also released as a demo alternative on a second CD with additional B-sides. In the United States, the song was serviced to alternative radio in August 1996.

== Track listings ==
UK CD1

1. "You've Got It Bad"
2. "Robin Hood"
3. "I Wanna Stay Alive with You"
4. "Huckleberry Grove"

UK CD2

1. "You've Got It Bad" (demo version)
2. "Here in My Heart"
3. "Men of Such Opinion"
4. "Beautiful Losers"

UK cassette single

1. "You've Got It Bad"
2. "I Wanna Stay Alive with You"

== Credits and personnel ==
Credits are taken from the Moseley Shoals album booklet.

Studios

- Recorded and mixed at Moseley Shoals (Birmingham, England)
- Mastered at the Powerplant (London, England)

Personnel

- Ocean Colour Scene – writing, production
  - Simon Fowler – vocals, acoustic guitar
  - Steve Cradock – guitar, piano, vocals
  - Oscar Harrison – drums, piano, vocals
  - Damon Minchella – bass guitar
- Brendan Lynch – production
- Martin Heyes – engineering
- Tony Keach – assistant engineering
- Tim Young – mastering

== Charts ==
Chart (1996)	Peak position
Europe (Eurochart Hot 100)	20
Scottish Singles Sales (Official Charts)	4
UK Singles (Official Charts)	7

== Release history ==
Region	Date	Format(s)	Label(s)	Ref.
United Kingdom	25 March 1996	CD	MCA	
United Kingdom	8 April 1996	Cassette	MCA	
United States	12 August 1996	Alternative radio	MCA	
