= The Day We Caught the Train =

1996 single by Ocean Colour Scene

Single by Ocean Colour Scene

from the album Moseley Shoals
- B-side: "The Clock Struck 15 Hours Ago"; "I Need a Love Song"; "Chicken Bones and Stones"; "Travellers Tune"; "Justine"
- Released: 3 June 1996
- Studio: Moseley Shoals (Birmingham, England)
- Length: 3:06
- Label: MCA
- Songwriter: Ocean Colour Scene
- Producers: Brendan Lynch; Ocean Colour Scene

Ocean Colour Scene singles chronology
"You've Got It Bad" (1996)	"The Day We Caught the Train" (1996)	"The Circle" (1996)

"The Day We Caught the Train" is a song by British rock band Ocean Colour Scene. The song was released on 3 June 1996 as the third single from their second studio album, Moseley Shoals (1996), and reached number four on the UK Singles Chart, achieving platinum status for sales and streams exceeding 600,000. The single was also released as an acoustic alternative on a second CD, with additional B-sides including "Justine", which is a re-recording that had originally appeared on Ocean Colour Scene, and "Travellers Tune", which was included on the band's third album, Marchin' Already.

== Track listings ==
UK CD1

1. "The Day We Caught the Train" – 3:10
2. "The Clock Struck 15 Hours Ago" – 3:05
3. "I Need a Love Song" – 2:08
4. "Chicken Bones and Stones" – 3:34

UK CD2

1. "The Day We Caught the Train" (acoustic version) – 3:20
2. "Travellers Tune" – 3:43
3. "Justine" – 3:16

UK cassette single

1. "The Day We Caught the Train"
2. "The Clock Struck 15 Hours Ago"

Australian CD single

1. "The Day We Caught the Train" – 3:10
2. "The Clock Struck 15 Hours Ago" – 3:05
3. "I Need a Love Song" – 2:08
4. "Chicken Bones and Stones" – 3:34
5. "The Day We Caught the Train" (acoustic version) – 3:10

== Credits and personnel ==
Credits are taken from the Moseley Shoals album booklet.

Studios

- Recorded and mixed at Moseley Shoals (Birmingham, England)
- Mastered at the Powerplant (London, England)

Personnel

- Ocean Colour Scene – writing, production
  - Simon Fowler – vocals, acoustic guitar
  - Steve Cradock – guitar, piano, vocals
  - Oscar Harrison – drums, piano, vocals
  - Damon Minchella – bass guitar
- Brendan Lynch – production
- Martin Heyes – engineering
- Tony Keach – assistant engineering
- Tim Young – mastering

== Charts ==
=== Weekly charts ===
Chart (1996)	Peak position
Europe (Eurochart Hot 100)	31
Iceland (Íslenski Listinn Topp 40)	25
Israel (IBA)	22
Scottish Singles Sales (Official Charts)	4
UK Singles (Official Charts)	4

=== Year-end charts ===
Chart (1996)	Position
UK Singles (OCC)	65

== Certifications ==
Region	Certification	Certified units/sales
United Kingdom (BPI)	Platinum	600,000^{‡}
^{‡} Sales+streaming figures based on certification alone.

== Release history ==
Region	Date	Format(s)	Label(s)	Ref.
United Kingdom	3 June 1996	CD; cassette	MCA	
United States	10 February 1997	Alternative radio	MCA	

== See also ==
- List of train songs
