= July (Ocean Colour Scene song) =

2000 single by Ocean Colour Scene

Single by Ocean Colour Scene

from the album One from the Modern
- A-side: "I Am the News"
- B-side: "This Understanding" (live)
- Released: 26 June 2000
- Label: Island
- Songwriters: Simon Fowler, Steve Cradock, Oscar Harrison, Damon Minchella
- Producer: Brendan Lynch

Ocean Colour Scene singles chronology
"So Low" (1999)	"July" / "I Am the News" (2000)	"Up on the Downside" (2001)

"July" is a song by English rock band Ocean Colour Scene (OCS). Released on 26 June 2000 as a double A-side with "I Am the News", the single reached number 31 on the UK Singles Chart and number 41 in Ireland. It was the third and final single released from their fourth studio album, One from the Modern (1999). The song is based on an earlier song called "Winter in July".

The single was used as the theme tune to the television series Lock, Stock..., the spin-off from Lock, Stock and Two Smoking Barrels which had used "Hundred Mile High City".

== Track listings ==
UK CD1

1. "July" (new version)
2. "I Am the News" (new version)
3. "July" (Forza Moderna mix)

UK CD2

1. "July" (live at the London Astoria)
2. "I Am the News" (live at the Dublin Point)
3. "This Understanding" (live at Stirling Castle)
4. "This Understanding" (live enhanced video)

UK 7-inch single

A. "July" (new version)
AA. "I Am the News" (new version)

== Charts ==
All entries charted as "July" / "I Am the News".

Chart (2000)	Peak position
Ireland (IRMA)	41
Scotland Singles (OCC)	15
UK Singles (OCC)	31
