= Soul Driver =

Soul Driver may refer to:

- Soul Driver, a 2000 album by Julie Christensen
- "Soul Driver", a song by Bruce Springsteen on his 1992 album Human Touch
- "Soul Driver", a song by Ocean Colour Scene on their 1999 album One from the Modern
