= Paint Your Picture =

Paint Your Picture may refer to:

- "Paint Your Picture", a song from the 1993 Steve Hackett album Guitar Noir
- "Paint Your Picture", a song from the 1999 Josh Ritter album Josh Ritter
- "Paint Your Picture", a song from the 2009 Steve Cradock album The Kundalini Target
