= Painting (album) =

Studio album by Ocean Colour Scene
- Released: 11 February 2013
- Genres: Alternative rock; indie rock
- Length: 38:21
- Label: Cooking Vinyl
- Producers: Matt Terry; Steve Cradock

Ocean Colour Scene chronology
Saturday (2010)	Painting (2013)	Ocean Colour Scene EP (2018)

Painting is the tenth studio album by Ocean Colour Scene, released on 11 February 2013. The album charted at number 49 in the UK in its first week of release, making it their lowest-charting studio album since their 1992 debut. In September 2021 the album was released on white vinyl for the very first time.

== Critical reception ==
Professional ratings
Aggregate scores
Source	Rating
Metacritic	55/100
Review scores
Source	Rating
AllMusic	3/5 stars
MusicOMH	2.5/5 stars
NME	3/5 stars
PopMatters	8/10
Sputnikmusic	2.5/5

Painting was met with "mixed or average" reviews from critics. At Metacritic, which assigns a weighted average rating out of 100 to reviews from mainstream publications, this release received an average score of 55 based on 9 reviews.

In a review for AllMusic, Stephen Thomas Erlewine wrote: "They continue to mine interesting sounds out of this vein but the sounds and structures, not the songs, are what's memorable about Painting. Ocean Colour Scene are agile within the confines of their wheelhouse so it's enjoyable to hear them play and construct records, even if they rarely give you a reason for a return visit."

== Track listing ==
All tracks are written by Simon Fowler, except where indicated

Painting track listing
No.	Title	Writer(s)	Length
1.	"We Don't Look in the Mirror"	Simon Fowler	3:08
2.	"Painting"	Fowler	2:27
3.	"Goodbye Old Town"	Fowler	2:24
4.	"Doodle Book"	Andy Croft; Steve Cradock	2:58
5.	"If God Made Everyone"	Fowler	3:28
6.	"Weekend"	Fowler	3:16
7.	"Professor Perplexity"	Fowler; Cradock	3:05
8.	"George's Tower"	Fowler	1:21
9.	"I Don't Want to Leave England"	Fowler; Cradock	2:51
10.	"The Winning Side"	Fowler	2:34
11.	"Mistaken Identity"	Fowler	2:25
12.	"The Union"	Fowler; Cradock	3:04
13.	"The New Torch Song"	Fowler	3:19
14.	"Here Comes the Dawning Day"	Fowler	1:53

iTunes bonus track
No.	Title	Length
15.	"Shooting the Bridge"	2:48

Japanese bonus version
No.	Title	Length
15.	"Come Up and See Me"
16.	"Old, Old Song"

== Personnel ==
- Simon Fowler – vocals
- Steve Cradock – guitar, mellotron, bass, piano, mandolin, dulcimer
- Oscar Harrison – drums, backing vocals, percussion, bass, piano
- Jade Luke, Jordon Richards, Maxine Brooks – backing vocals (track 1, 4, 6, 13)
- Ray Beavies – tenor saxophone (track 4)
- Sam Smith – trombone (track 4)
- Rich Mills – trumpet (track 4)
- Matt Terry – programming

== Charts ==
Chart performance for Painting
Chart (2013)	Peak position
Scottish Albums (Official Charts)	29
UK Albums (Official Charts)	49
UK Independent Albums (Official Charts)	5
