= On the Leyline =

Studio album by Ocean Colour Scene
- Released: 30 April 2007
- Recorded: Woodbine, Leamington Spa, Warwickshire
- Genre: Rock
- Length: 39:42
- Label: Moseley Shoals
- Producer: John A. Rivers

Ocean Colour Scene chronology
A Hyperactive Workout for the Flying Squad (2005)	On the Leyline (2007)	Saturday (2010)

Professional ratings
Review scores
Source	Rating
AllMusic	4/5 stars
Bournemouth Daily Echo	3/5 stars
The Guardian	2/5 stars
The Independent	2/5 stars
Manchester Evening News	Favourable
The Skinny	3/5 stars

On the Leyline is the eighth studio album by Ocean Colour Scene. It was released on 30 April 2007 and entered the UK album charts on 6 May 2007, peaking at No.37, lasting only a single week in the top 75.

== Releases ==
The album contains a Paul Weller song entitled "For Dancers Only" (later released by Weller and Graham Coxon under the name "This Old Town"). The fourth track ("Man in the Middle"), was written by the band's bass guitarist, Dan Sealey, and was originally recorded by his previous band "Late". The first single, "I Told You So", was released two weeks before the album release on 16 April and reached number 34 in the UK singles charts. The second single released from the album was "I Just Got Over You" which entered and peaked at number 112 following little attention from the music press. The album's third single, "Go to Sea", was released on 12 November 2007 as a free download via the band's official website. This was to promote their then-forthcoming Christmas tour. The single became the first Ocean Colour Scene single to fail to chart since 1992.

== Track listing ==
All songs written by Simon Fowler unless otherwise stated:

1. "I Told You So" – 2:12
2. "On the Leyline, Waiting" – 2:24 (Steve Cradock)
3. "For Dancers Only" – 3:43 (Paul Weller)
4. "Man in the Middle" – 4:40 (Dan Sealey)
5. "I Just Got Over You" – 3:40
6. "Go to Sea" – 5:22
7. "These Days I'm Tired" – 2:54 (Cradock)
8. "You'll Never Find Me" – 2:24 (Strings arranged and played by John Rivers)
9. "Don't Get Me" – 3:28
10. "Loneliest Girl in the Whole Wide World" – 2:42
11. "Mr. Brown" – 2:30
12. "Two Lovers" – 2:11
13. "Daylight" – 1:32

== Personnel ==
- Simon Fowler – lead and backing vocals, acoustic guitar, harmonica
- Steve Cradock – electric and acoustic guitar, vocals, autoharp, percussion, piano, Mellotron
- Andy Bennett – electric and acoustic guitar
- Dan Sealey – bass, electric guitar, lead vocals
- Oscar Harrison – drums, backing vocals, percussion, bass
