= The Circle (song) =

1996 single by Ocean Colour Scene

Single by Ocean Colour Scene

from the album Moseley Shoals
- B-side: "Mrs Jones"; "Cool Cool Water"; "Top of the World"; "Chelsea Walk"; "Alibis"; "Day Tripper"
- Released: 16 September 1996
- Studio: Moseley Shoals (Birmingham, England)
- Length: 3:43
- Label: MCA
- Songwriter: Ocean Colour Scene
- Producers: Brendan Lynch; Ocean Colour Scene

Ocean Colour Scene singles chronology
"The Day We Caught the Train" (1996)	"The Circle" (1996)	"Hundred Mile High City" (1997)

Music video
- "The Circle" on YouTube

"The Circle" is a song by English rock band Ocean Colour Scene, released on 16 September 1996 as the fourth single from their second studio album, Moseley Shoals (1996). The song reached number six on the UK Singles Chart the same month. Like the previous single, this single was also released as an acoustic alternative on a second CD with additional B-sides.

== Track listings ==
UK CD1

1. "The Circle"
2. "Mrs Jones"
3. "Cool Cool Water"
4. "Top of the World"

UK CD2

1. "The Circle" (acoustic)
2. "Chelsea Walk"
3. "Alibis"
4. "Day Tripper" (featuring Liam and Noel Gallagher)

UK cassette single

1. "The Circle"
2. "Day Tripper"

== Credits and personnel ==
Credits are taken from the Moseley Shoals album booklet.

Studios

- Recorded and mixed at Moseley Shoals (Birmingham, England)
- Mastered at the Powerplant (London, England)

Personnel

- Ocean Colour Scene – writing, production
  - Simon Fowler – vocals, acoustic guitar
  - Steve Cradock – guitar, piano, vocals
  - Oscar Harrison – drums, piano, vocals
  - Damon Minchella – bass guitar
- Paul Weller – guitar
- Brendan Lynch – production
- Martin Heyes – engineering
- Tony Keach – assistant engineering
- Tim Young – mastering

== Charts ==
Chart (1996)	Peak position
Europe (Eurochart Hot 100)	52
Scottish Singles Sales (Official Charts)	3
UK Singles (Official Charts)	6
