= Mechanical Wonder =

Studio album by Ocean Colour Scene
- Released: 9 April 2001
- Recorded: November 2000 Loco Studios, Moseley Shoals & The Fallout Shelter
- Genres: Alternative rock, blues rock
- Length: 42:51
- Label: Island
- Producer: Martin 'Max' Heyes

Ocean Colour Scene chronology
One from the Modern (1999)	Mechanical Wonder (2001)	North Atlantic Drift (2003)

Professional ratings
Review scores
Source	Rating
AllMusic	3/5 stars
Alternative Press	1/5 stars
entertainment.ie	1/5 stars
The Herald	1/5 stars
The Independent	2/5 stars
NME	2/5 stars
Pitchfork	6.9/10
Q	3/5 stars
RTÉ.ie	1/5 stars
Under the Radar	5/10

Mechanical Wonder is the fifth album by Ocean Colour Scene. It peaked on the UK album chart at #7 and lasted four weeks in the top 75. To date, it is the last Ocean Colour Scene release to enter the top 10.

Simon Fowler wrote in the liner notes of the band's greatest hits album "Songs for the Front Row" that the title referred to cars on the motorway. Live however, Simon Fowler often sings "and the radio plays only fucking Radio 1", a possible reference to the lack of airplay the band get. The other single from the album was "Up on the Downside", which fared better in the charts. The album was not a success, marking the end of the Britpop success of the band. After the failure of the album, the band decided to release themselves from their contract with their record label.

== Track listing ==
1. "Up on the Downside"
2. "In My Field"
3. "Sail on My Boat"
4. "Biggest Thing"
5. "We Made It More"
6. "Give Me a Letter"
7. "Mechanical Wonder"
8. "You Are Amazing"
9. "If I Gave You My Heart"
10. "Can't Get Back to the Baseline"
11. "Something for Me" (UK bonus track)
12. "Anyway, Anyhow, Anywhere" (Japanese bonus track)

== Additional personnel ==
- Mick Talbot – keyboards (unspecified tracks)
- Edgar Summertyme – backing vocals (track 1)
- Mark Feltham – harmonica (track 7)
- Steve White – timpani (track 7)
