= Ocean Colour Scene (album) =

Studio album by Ocean Colour Scene
- Released: 26 May 1992
- Genres: Madchester, R&B, shoegaze, soul
- Length: 47:16
- Label: Fontana
- Producer: Brendan Lynch

Ocean Colour Scene chronology
Ocean Colour Scene (1992)	Moseley Shoals (1996)

Singles from Ocean Colour Scene
- 1. "Sway" Released: 12 November 1990; 2. "Sway (re-issue)" Released: 10 February 1992; 3. "Giving It All Away" Released: 23 March 1992; 4. "Do Yourself a Favour" Released: 4 May 1992

Professional ratings
Review scores
Source	Rating
AllMusic	2.5/5 stars

Ocean Colour Scene is the 1992 debut album by the British rock group Ocean Colour Scene. It was released during the tail end of the baggy era with far less commercial success and critical interest than their run of albums beginning with their highly successful second album Moseley Shoals. Members of Ocean Colour Scene have expressed their opinions that the album was hindered by the band's and label's conflicting musical views, which they felt led to a 'watered-down' debut which lacked the edge of the band's live sound.

The first single from the album was "Sway" in February 1992, followed by "Giving it All Away" in March and finally "Do Yourself a Favour" in May. A remastered 2CD Deluxe edition of the album was released in February 2014 which included the original album together with A and B sides of early singles and a few outtakes.

== Track listing ==
All songs written by Ocean Colour Scene except as indicated.

1. "Talk On" – 4:07
2. "How About You" – 3:14
3. "Giving It All Away" – 4:11
4. "Justine" – 3:32
5. "Do Yourself a Favour" (Stevie Wonder, Syreeta Wright) – 3:48
6. "Third Shade of Green" – 4:39
7. "Sway" – 3:42
8. "Penny Pinching Rainy Heaven Days" – 3:13
9. "One of Those Days" – 4:13
10. "Is She Coming Home" – 6:06
11. "Blue Deep Ocean" – 4:56
12. "Reprise" – 1:30

=== 2014 Deluxe Edition Bonus Disc ===
1. "One of Those Days" (Single Version) – 5:01
2. "Talk On" – 4:33
3. "Sway" (Original Version) – 3:55
4. "Lullaby" – 1:49
5. "One of These Days" – 5:37
6. "Yesterday Today" – 3:18
7. "Another Girl's Name" – 3:24
8. "Fly Me" – 4:32
9. "No One Says" – 5:01
10. "My Brother Sarah" – 2:44
11. "Mona Lisa Eyes" – 3:42
12. "Bellechoux" – 3:23
13. "Flowers" – 4:04
14. "Don't Play" – 4:15
15. "The Seventh Floor" – 5:05
16. "Patsy in Green" – 2:24
17. "Suspended Motion" – 3:55
18. "Blue Deep Ocean" (Alt. Version) – 4:40
19. "Is She Coming Home" (Alt. Version) – 6:07

== Personnel ==
- Simon Fowler – lead vocals, guitar
- Stephen Craddock – guitar, keyboards, backing vocals
- Damon Minchella – bass
- Oscar Harrison – drums, backing vocals
