= Goldbug (band) =

1990s British pop band

Goldbug were a British pop band in the 1990s. The band were formed in London and Brighton in 1995 by a former member of the Beatmasters, Richard Walmsley, drummer Tony Horkins and DJ Adil Magik, with a session vocalist, Sandy McKenzie, who was recruited through an advertisement in Melody Maker.

Goldbug had a UK hit single with a cover of Led Zeppelin's "Whole Lotta Love", also sampling "Asteroid" (the Pearl & Dean theme tune), and released on 15 January 1996 on the Acid Jazz label. "Whole Lotta Love" was played heavily by Chris Evans on the Radio 1 Breakfast Show, and the track entered the UK Singles Chart on 20 January 1996 at number 3, staying in the charts for five weeks. It reached number one on the ITV chart, Dance chart and Indie chart. The band made their sole appearance on Top of the Pops on 25 January 1996, performing the song with replacement singer, Katherine Ellis. Ellis was later replaced with vocalist Shari Mjoh (called Sharona in the band) who recorded a string of songs with the band including lead vocals on their sole follow-up single, "Real Hip Mary", which was released by EMI.

Tony Horkins and Adil Magik left the band after contractual issues with Walmsley at the end of 1996. Their sole follow-up single, "Real Hip Mary", was released by EMI but failed to reach the top 75 in 1997. In 2000, Walmsley sued Acid Jazz over unpaid royalties relating to the "Whole Lotta Love" single. He was successful, receiving many thousands of pounds. Due to the royalty disputes, McKenzie received no money from the band's short existence.

Former lead vocalist McKenzie experienced much hardship after the dissolution of the band, having almost died due to a severe assault, and experiencing homelessness. Her attacker is now in prison.

== Discography ==
=== Singles ===
List of singles, with selected chart positions
Title	Year	Peak chart positions		
Title	Year	UK	AUS	IRE
"Whole Lotta Love"	1996	3	80	24
"Real Hip Mary"	1997	97	—	—
