= One from the Modern =

Studio album by Ocean Colour Scene
- Released: 13 September 1999
- Studios: Moseley Shoals (Birmingham, England)
- Length: 43:24
- Label: Island
- Producer: Brendan Lynch

Ocean Colour Scene chronology
Marchin' Already (1997)	One from the Modern (1999)	Mechanical Wonder (2001)

Singles from One from the Modern
- 1. "Profit in Peace" Released: 23 August 1999; 2. "So Low" Released: 15 November 1999; 3. "July" / "I Am the News" Released: 26 June 2000

Professional ratings
Review scores
Source	Rating
AllMusic	4/5 stars
The Guardian	3/5 stars
The Independent	2/5 stars
Melodic	3/5 stars
Sunday Herald	2/5 stars
The Times	1/5 stars

One from the Modern is the fourth album by Ocean Colour Scene.

== Content ==
The album made a departure from the two previous albums Moseley Shoals and Marchin' Already, and is slower and sadder. It was panned by critics who accused it of being too commercial and labelled it "dad rock". The album was dismissed by David Belcher of The Herald, who commented on its "strangled vocals" and "cringe-worthy lyrics." Nicholas Barber writing for The Independent concurred saying: "Much of the blame must rest on Simon Fowler. His mangled vocals and nonsense lyrics suggest that he doesn't know what it is he wants to communicate."

The protest song "Profit in Peace" was the first single, with "So Low" and then a double release of "I Am the News"/"July". The song "Soul Driver" is dedicated to Paul Weller, who mentored the band.

The album's cover photograph was taken in the Yew Garden at Packwood House near Lapworth, Warwickshire, a National Trust Property.

== Track listing ==
1. "Profit in Peace" – 4:14
2. "So Low" – 3:54
3. "I Am the News" – 4:03
4. "No-One at All" – 3:34
5. "Families" – 3:11
6. "Step by Step" – 2:34
7. "July" – 2:56
8. "Jane She Got Excavated" – 3:35
9. "Emily Chambers" – 2:40
10. "Soul Driver" – 3:44
11. "The Waves" – 6:08
12. "I Won't Get Grazed" – 2:51

== Additional personnel ==
- Tony Griffiths and Chris Griffiths – backing vocals (tracks 1 and 3)
- Brendan Lynch – Mellotron flute (track 1)
- Steve White – tabla (track 3)
- Paul Weller – backing vocals (track 4)
- Brian Travers – saxophone (track 9)

== Charts ==
=== Weekly charts ===
Chart (1999)	Peak position
German Albums (Offizielle Top 100)	92
Scottish Albums (Official Charts)	4
UK Albums (Official Charts)	4

=== Year-end charts ===
Chart (1999)	Position
UK Albums (OCC)	88
