= North Atlantic Drift (album) =

Studio album by Ocean Colour Scene
- Released: 7 July 2003
- Genre: Blues rock
- Length: 44:37
- Label: Sanctuary
- Producers: Martin 'Max' Hayes, Ocean Colour Scene

Ocean Colour Scene chronology
Mechanical Wonder (2001)	North Atlantic Drift (2003)	A Hyperactive Workout for the Flying Squad (2005)

Singles from North Atlantic Drift
- 1. "I Just Need Myself" Released: 30 June 2003; 2. "Make the Deal" Released: 25 August 2003; 3. "Golden Gate Bridge" Released: 29 December 2003

North Atlantic Drift is the sixth studio album by British rock band Ocean Colour Scene and the last to feature founding member and bassist Damon Minchella.

== Background ==
Martin 'Max' Hayes and the band co-produced every song, except for "For Every Corner", which was produced solely by the former. They were assisted by Tim Roe (who also did additional engineering on "When Evil Comes"), Darren, Nash, Darren Blackwell, and Tom Webster. Hayes and Pete Craigie mixed the recordings.

== Composition ==
Musically, the sound of North Atlantic Drift has been described as blues rock. The opening track "I Just Need Myself" is done in the style of the Faces, with percussion from Steve White. "Oh Collector" features guitar contributions from Kevin Rowe. The title track is political commentary on American cultural imperialism and its support by the UK government, particularly the then impending US-led invasion of Iraq, which was opposed by the majority of the British public. The Paul Weller-like "Golden Gate Bridge" is followed by the Phil Spector-indebted "Make the Deal", with a string arrangement from Sonia Slany. Duncan Mackay, James Hunt and Nichol Tompson appear on "On My Way", playing trumpet, saxophone and trombone, respectively; it is followed by the folk-esque "Second Hand Car". "She's Been Writing", which also featured a string arrangement from Slany, includes vocal contribution from Linda Thompson. Dalbir Singh Rattan plays tabla on "When Evil Comes", which ends with an atmospheric coda.

== Release ==
"I Just Need Myself" was released as a single on 30 June 2003. Two versions were released on CD: the first with "Will You Take Her Love" and "Me, I'm Left Unsure", and the second with "Questions" and "I Want to See the Bright Lights".

The US version was released on 19 August 2003, and contained four bonus tracks: "Will You Take Her Love", "Me, I'm Left Unsure", "Questions", and "I Want to See the Bright Lights". "Make the Deal" was released as a single on 25 August 2003. Two versions were released on CD: the first with "Perfect Stranger" and "I Never Believed It Too", while the other included "We Rise" and "St. Cecelia". The 7" vinyl version featured a Caged Baby remix of "I Just Need Myself" as the B-side.

Bassist Damon Minchella left the band in late 2003. "Golden Gate Bridge" was released as a single on 29 December 2003. The CD version featured live versions of "Get Away" and "The Riverboat Song", while the DVD version included videos of live versions of "Golden Gate Bridge", "Second Hand Car", and "The Day We Caught the Train".

== Reception ==
Professional ratings
Review scores
Source	Rating
AllMusic	4/5 stars
Drowned in Sound	1/5
Entertainment.ie	2/5 stars
Gigwise	3/5 stars
The List	1/5 marks
Mojo	3/5 stars
No Ripcord	5/10
Rolling Stone	3/5 stars
The Times	1/5 stars
Uncut	2/5 stars

North Atlantic Drift was met with mixed-to-negative reviews from music critics. AllMusic reviewer Stephen Thomas Erlewine wrote that "only the faithful would care [about a new album from Ocean Colour Scene], which is too bad, because it's the best record they've done in a long time." He said that while there was not any "great progression in the sound", the production "isn't nearly as claustrophobic as it was on its predecessor". Gigwise contributor Jamie Bowman wrote that the "riffs and harmonies are still as comfortably worn as a pair of old Gazelles [shoes]". He highlted "I Just Need Myself" as "show[ing] any sign of exuberance," as the remainder of the album was "a stodgy mixture of endlessly recycled homespun tunesmithery." No Ripcord writer Peter Mattinson referred to the album "a disappointment [...] and one that will be leapt upon by a lot of people. It's fair to say that in years to come, this [...] chapter in Ocean Colour Scene's history will be fairly well overlooked." John Dugan of Rolling Stone found the band to "still practices the same retro naturalism and love for soul and psychedelia, but amid the trad modness it gives increasing attention to breezy pop ditties and neo-folk melodies."

Entertainment.ie reviewer Andrew Lynch wrote that other than the album being on a new album, "it's business as usual: mid-paced blues-rock, turgid Dadrock arrangements and lyrics so vague as to be absolutely meaningless." Drowned in Sound writer Adie Nunn complimented three of the songs, "[b]ut that’s where the praise (!) starts and ends, as they’re straight back into their retro mod-pop ways after that." The List's Carolyn Rae wrote that the album would be enjoyed by fans of their last album, "otherwise don't except anything new." She went on further to say that "[m]ost bands grow and mature as their career develops but OCS are firmly stuck in the same groove." David Sinclair of The Times opened his review by calling it "all a bit sad. [... Nothing] can disguise the dog-eared sound of a band well past its sell-by date." The staff at Uncut simply stated "Ocean Colour Scene are inextricably linked to a mid-’90s era which now seems hideously pass".

The first track, "I Just Need Myself" reached #13 in the charts, though the other two singles did less well but still charted inside the top 40.

== Track listing ==
Track listing per booklet.

1. "I Just Need Myself" – 3:24
2. "Oh Collector" – 3:53
3. "North Atlantic Drift" – 3:09
4. "Golden Gate Bridge" – 4:09
5. "Make the Deal" – 3:58
6. "For Every Corner" – 3:47
7. "On My Way" – 3:26
8. "Second Hand Car" – 2:56
9. "She's Been Writing" – 4:12
10. "The Song Goes On" – 5:21
11. "When Evil Comes" – 6:22

== Personnel ==
Personnel per booklet.

Ocean Colour Scene

- Simon Fowler – lead vocals, Nashville guitar, acoustic guitar
- Steve Cradock – electric guitar, Nashville guitar, acoustic guitar, EBow, Hammond organ, piano, percussion, autoharp
- Damon Minchella – bass
- Oscar Harrison – drums, percussion, backing vocals

Additional musicians

- Sonia Slany – strings arrangement (track 5 and 9)
- Duncan Mackay – trumpet (track 7)
- James Hunt – saxophone (track 7)
- Nichol Tompson – trombone (track 7)
- Steve White – percussion (track 1)
- Kevin 'Ewok' Rowe – 2nd guitar (track 2)
- Linda Thompson – vocals (track 9)
- Dalbir Singh Rattan – tabla (track 11)

Production and design

- Martin 'Max' Hayes – producer, mixing
- Ocean Colour Scene – producer (all except track 6)
- Pete Craigie – mixing
- Tom Roe – additional engineering (track 11), assistant
- Darren Nash – assistant
- Darren Blackwell – assistant
- Tom Webster – assistant
- Ian – sleeve design
- Lawrence Watson – photography
