= Pass & Move (It's the Liverpool Groove) =

Single by Liverpool F.C.
- Released: 6 May 1996

Liverpool F.C. singles chronology
"Anfield Rap (Red Machine in Full Effect)" (1988)	"Pass & Move (It's the Liverpool Groove)" (1996)

"Pass & Move (It's the Liverpool Groove)" was a single released by the English football team Liverpool on 6 May 1996, ahead of their FA Cup final clash with Manchester United. It reached number 4 in the UK Singles Chart.

The song was written by Apollo 440, and recorded (with the Liverpool 1996 squad performing on vocals - with John Barnes on lead rap) at Apollo 440's London (Apollo Control) studio, as well as for a music video amid final mixing sessions at Parr Studios in Liverpool.
