= Moseley Shoals Records =

Moseley Shoals Records is an independent record label in the United Kingdom. The company was set up by British rock band Ocean Colour Scene in 2004, so that they could release their Live Acoustic at the Jam House album. The name Moseley Shoals is taken from their breakthrough second album Moseley Shoals. Moseley is an area of Birmingham where the band formed, and they named their recording studio Moseley Shoals in deference to Muscle Shoals Sound recording studio in Muscle Shoals, Alabama.

The serial codes on this label all begin with "OCS" which is a reference to the band's name "Ocean Colour Scene"

== Discography ==
=== Albums ===
- Ocean Colour Scene – Live Acoustic at the Jam House [Limited Edition] – 2006 – OCSCD2
- Ocean Colour Scene – On the Leyline – 2007 – OCSCD5

=== Singles ===
- "I Told You So" [CD1/CD2/Limited Blue 7'] – CDOCS1/CXOCS1/7OCS1
- "I Just Got Over You" [CD/Limited Red 7"] – CDOCS2/7OCS2
- "Go To Sea" [FREE DOWNLOAD from www.oceancolourscene.com]

=== DVDs ===
- Live at the Town Hall – OCSDVD1

== See also ==
- List of record labels
