= Moseley Shoals =

Studio album by Ocean Colour Scene
- Released: 8 April 1996
- Studios: Moseley Shoals (Birmingham, England)
- Genres: Britpop, alternative rock
- Length: 54:27
- Label: MCA
- Producers: Brendan Lynch, Ocean Colour Scene

Ocean Colour Scene chronology
Ocean Colour Scene (1992)	Moseley Shoals (1996)	Marchin' Already (1997)

Professional ratings
Review scores
Source	Rating
AllMusic	4.5/5 stars
The Austin Chronicle	2/5 stars
Daily Herald	1/4 stars
Encyclopedia of Popular Music	4/5 stars
The Guardian	3/5 stars
Los Angeles Daily News	3/4 stars
NME	5/10
The Philadelphia Inquirer	2/4 stars
Record Collector	2/5 stars
The Tampa Tribune	2.5/4 stars

Moseley Shoals is the second album by the British rock group Ocean Colour Scene which was released in 1996 during the Britpop era. The album reached number two in the UK chart, and amassed 92 weeks on that chart, making it the band's most successful album in terms of weeks on chart, despite a later album reaching number one.

== Album ==
The first single taken from the album was "The Riverboat Song", which was popularised by Chris Evans on TFI Friday. "The Day We Caught the Train" reached number four in the charts, with "You've Got It Bad" and "The Circle" also reaching the top 10. "One for the Road" was also due to be released, but the band decided to concentrate on the 1997 album release Marchin' Already. By November 1997, Moseley Shoals had sold over 1.2 million copies worldwide.

The word Moseley is taken from a suburb of the same name in south Birmingham, UK. The album title as a whole is a punning nod to the city of Muscle Shoals, Alabama, the location of several famous 1960s soul recording studios including FAME Studios and Muscle Shoals Sound Studio in nearby Sheffield, Alabama.

The album was produced by Brendan Lynch, and was recorded and mixed at the band's studio in Birmingham (Moseley Shoals).

In April, 2016, the album was re-released as part of the Record Store Day celebrations, on limited edition red vinyl, charting at No.5 on the vinyl album chart.

The memorial by which the band can be seen standing on the front cover is the Jephson Memorial in The Jephson Gardens, Leamington Spa, UK.

== Accolades ==
In 1998, Q magazine's readers voted Moseley Shoals the 33rd greatest album of all time. The album was placed at number 42 on Pitchfork's 2017 poll of "The 50 Best Britpop Albums."

== Moseley Shoals: Deluxe Edition ==
Released on 7 March 2011, the remastered album contained the original track list, plus all the B-sides from the four singles released ("The Riverboat Song", "The Day We Caught the Train", "The Circle" and "You've Got It Bad"). Most of these (all except "You've Got It Bad (demo)", "Men of Such Opinion", "I Need a Love Song" and "Justine") appeared on the B-side compilation album B-sides, Seasides and Freerides.

== Track listing ==
All tracks are written by Ocean Colour Scene

No.	Title	Length
1.	"The Riverboat Song"	4:54
2.	"The Day We Caught the Train"	3:06
3.	"The Circle"	3:43
4.	"Lining Your Pockets"	3:36
5.	"Fleeting Mind"	5:09
6.	"40 Past Midnight"	4:01
7.	"One for the Road"	3:43
8.	"It's My Shadow"	4:23
9.	"Policemen & Pirates"	4:03
10.	"The Downstream"	5:32
11.	"You've Got It Bad"	4:26
12.	"Get Away"	7:55

2011 Deluxe edition bonus disc
No.	Title	Length
1.	"So Sad"	4:22
2.	"Charlie Brown Says"	2:57
3.	"Robin Hood"	3:35
4.	"I Wanna Stay Alive with You"	3:34
5.	"Huckleberry Grove"	3:00
6.	"You've Got It Bad (demo)"	3:56
7.	"Here in My Heart"	3:03
8.	"Men of Such Opinion"	3:22
9.	"Beautiful Losers"	2:41
10.	"Mona Lisa Eyes"	3:42
11.	"The Clock Struck 15 Hours Ago"	3:06
12.	"I Need a Love Song"	2:09
13.	"Chicken Bones and Stones"	3:36
14.	"The Day We Caught the Train (acoustic)"	3:22
15.	"Travellers Tune"	3:45
16.	"Justine"	3:18
17.	"Mrs Jones"	2:58
18.	"Cool Cool Water"	2:41
19.	"Top of the World"	3:48
20.	"The Circle (acoustic)"	3:06
21.	"Chelsea Walk"	3:12
22.	"Alibis"	3:04
23.	"Day Tripper (live)"	4:22

== Personnel ==
Credits are adapted from the album's liner notes.

Ocean Colour Scene

- Simon Fowler – lead vocals, acoustic guitar, harmonica
- Steve Cradock – guitars, piano, vocals
- Damon Minchella – bass
- Oscar Harrison – drums, piano, vocals

Additional personnel

- Paul Weller – organ (track 1), guitar (track 3), piano (track 7), backing vocals (track 7)
- Brendan Lynch – production
- Martyn Heyes – engineering
- Tony Keach – engineering assistance
- Tim Young – mastering
- Gerard Saint – sleeve design
- Lord Antony Mark Briggs – photography

== Charts ==
=== Weekly charts ===
Chart (1996–2000)	Peak position
Irish Albums (IRMA)	64
New Zealand Albums (RMNZ)	23
Scottish Albums (Official Charts)	2
UK Albums (Official Charts)	2

=== Year-end charts ===
Chart (1996)	Position
UK Albums (OCC)	11
Chart (1997)	Position
UK Albums (OCC)	75

== Certifications ==
Region	Certification	Certified units/sales
United Kingdom (BPI)	3× Platinum	900,000^{^}
^{^} Shipments figures based on certification alone.
