= Ocean Colour Scene =

English rock band

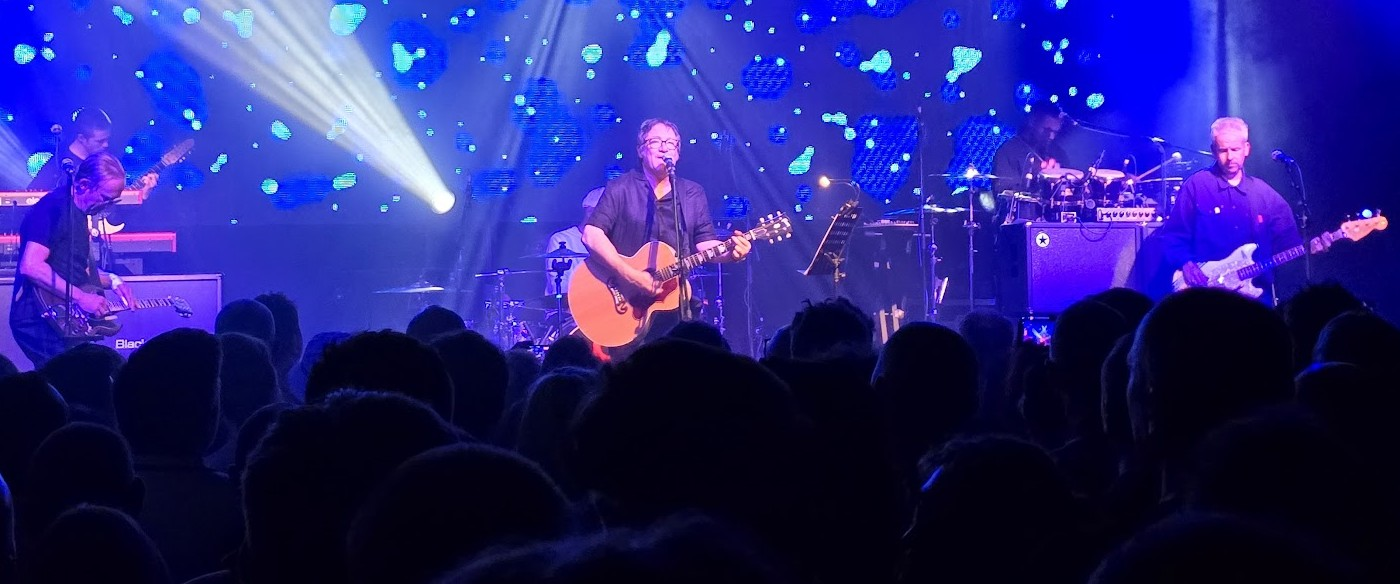
- Ocean Colour Scene performing in Liverpool in 2025

Background information
- Origin: Birmingham, England
- Genres: Alternative rock; indie rock; blues rock; Britpop; baggy (early)
- Years active: 1989–present
- Labels: Fontana; Island; Sanctuary; Moseley Shoals; Cooking Vinyl; Live Here Now
- Members: Simon Fowler; Steve Cradock; Oscar Harrison; Raymond Meade
- Past members: Damon Minchella; Dan Sealey; Andy Bennett
- Website: oceancolourscene.com

Ocean Colour Scene (often abbreviated to OCS) are an English rock band formed in Moseley, Birmingham in 1989. They have had five top 10 albums, including a number one in 1997. They have also achieved seventeen top 40 singles and six top 10 singles to date.

== History ==
=== Early days (1990–1995) ===
Ocean Colour Scene was formed from two other bands disbanding; the Boys (Steve Cradock) and Fanatics (Simon Fowler, Damon Minchella, Oscar Harrison). Fanatics had released an EP titled Suburban Love Songs in March 1989. The name was decided upon when the band went through books in a library looking for words they liked. OCS signed to !Phffftt Records in 1990.

Their first single, "Sway", was released in September 1990. When their record label was swallowed up by larger company Phonogram their eponymous début album was remixed, against the band's wishes, to fit in with the baggy/indie-dance musical trend of the time. The album was largely deemed a failure. Being in dispute with their label, the band was forced back onto unemployment benefits, with no real direction and only able to write new music with no outlet for it.

In 1993, the start of the turnaround occurred. Paul Weller invited the band to support him on some dates of his tour. On the back of these performances, Weller invited guitarist Steve Cradock to play on one of his singles, and vocalist Simon Fowler to sing on his album Wild Wood. Cradock was asked to play live with Weller on his tour, and the money Cradock made allowed the band to keep paying rent for a studio.

=== Britpop fame (1995–2000) ===
The band recorded a demo that was sent to various industry figures. After hearing this tape, Noel Gallagher invited the band to play with Oasis on their 1995 tour. This support slot brought OCS to the attention of more record labels, and eventually in late 1995, the band signed with MCA Records.

With the explosion of the Britpop scene, OCS's music became nationally and internationally known. Their second album Moseley Shoals was released to mixed-to-positive reviews, containing four hit singles and reached No. 2 in the UK Albums Chart. They also played at one of the concerts at Knebworth House supporting Oasis in August 1996.

Marchin' Already, the follow-up to Moseley Shoals, went to No. 1 in the UK Albums Chart, displacing Oasis' Be Here Now at the top of the charts in 1997. In 1998 they headlined their own arena tour in support of Marchin' Already and played three sold out nights at Stirling Castle, Scotland.

One from the Modern was released in 1999, and peaked in the UK Albums Chart at No. 4. The record spawned three top 40 singles, "Profit in Peace", "So Low" and "July".

A Greatest Hits album, Songs for the Front Row, was released in 2001.

=== Post-Britpop (2001–2008) ===
Following the release 2001's Mechanical Wonder and 2003's North Atlantic Drift, bassist Damon Minchella and the band parted ways in the midst of their autumn tour in 2003: he was briefly substituted for the remainder of the tour dates by Mani of The Stone Roses for the remainder of the tour, and eventually Dan Sealey as a full-time member, with whom the band continued to record and perform. His first album with the band was 2005's A Hyperactive Workout for the Flying Squad, followed by 2007's On the Leyline, which continued the trend of releasing new material every two years.

Also around this time, the band began to release live albums, with Live: One for the Road, a compilation of nineteen live tracks taken from various concerts, in 2004, and a live acoustic album, Live at the Jam House, which consisted of fifteen live tracks and also contained four new songs entitled "Great Man in Waiting", "The Word", "Still Trying" and "Matilda's England", in 2006.

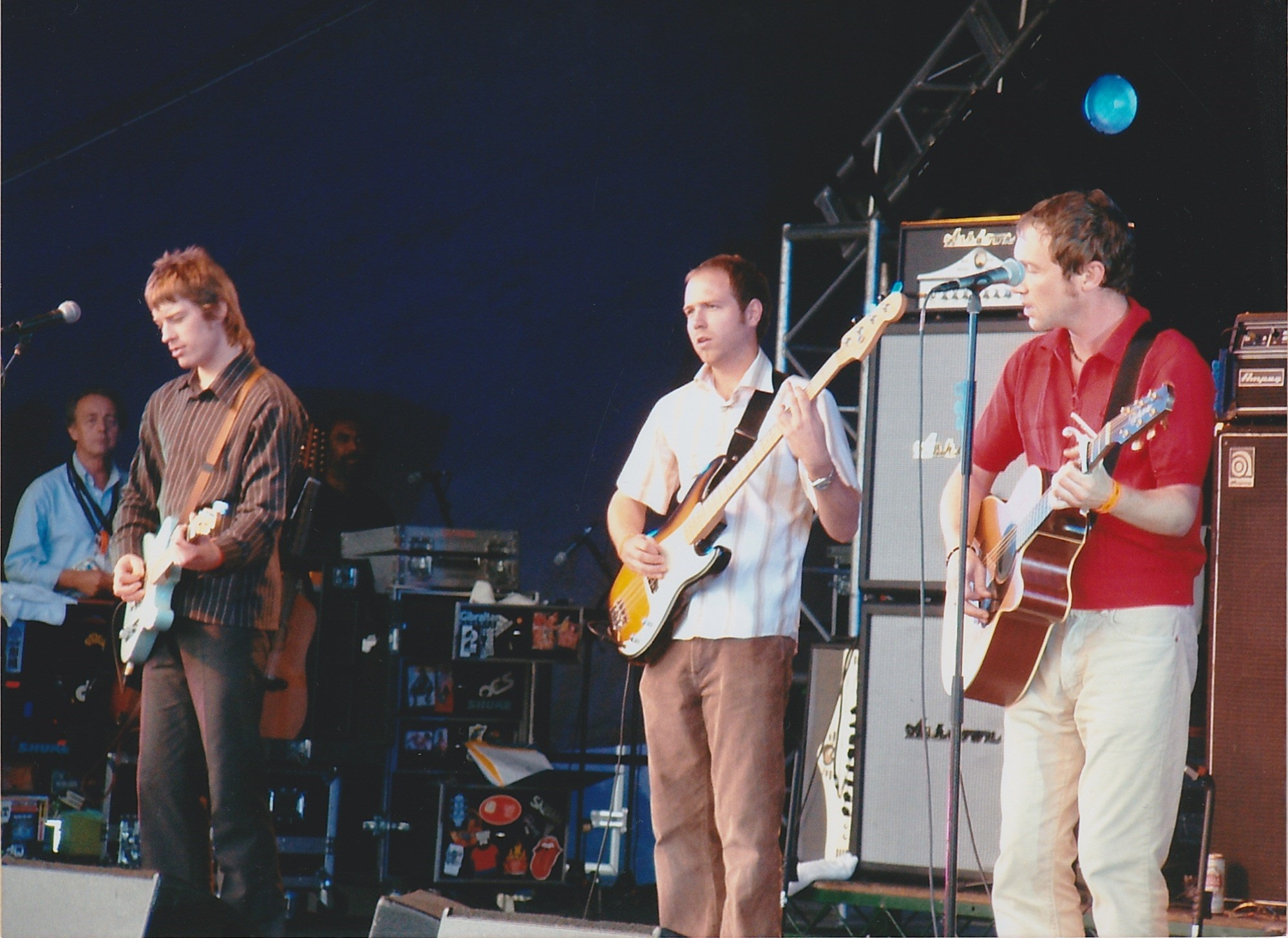
Ocean Colour Scene performing at Guilfest in 2004

The band also released a live album in December 2006, which was recorded at Birmingham Academy and spread over two discs. People attending the gig were able to purchase the recording straight afterwards.

=== Recent years (2009–present) ===
In 2009, the band went into the studio with producer Gavin Monaghan, known for his work with Editors, Scott Matthews and the Twang, to work on a new album, Saturday, with a release date of 1 February 2010 to mark the 21st anniversary of the band. The album had a working title of 'Rockfield', named after the studios where it was recorded, but it was released as Saturday - both "Rockfield" and "Saturday" being tracks thereon.

On 2 November 2009, the band released a free downloadable version of a new song, "Mrs Maylie". "Magic Carpet Days", the first single from Saturday, was released on 25 January, followed by the album a few days later. The album charted at No. 35 on the UK Albums Chart. A second single, "Saturday", was released in May 2010 but it failed to chart. On 24 July 2010 they performed at the Wickerman Festival.

On 11 October 2010, the band released a 4-CD box set, 21, to celebrate the 21st anniversary of the band. It included many previously unreleased tracks and a brand new song entitled "Twenty One".

In March 2011, the band released a 15th anniversary special edition of their 1996 hit album Moseley Shoals. It consisted of the full album, b-sides and live tracks. The band played a full UK tour in support of the re-release. December saw the limited edition release of a double CD/DVD release of the band's Moseley Shoals gig at O2 Academy Birmingham, which was filmed on 26 February 2011. They performed an acoustic set at Lanford Live in 2011 for the Teenage Cancer Trust.

In December 2012, the band announced the forthcoming release of their tenth studio album, Painting, which was released on 11 February 2013. They also played at V-festival where Inbetweeners actor James Buckley performed "The Circle" with them in Chelmsford and at The Electric Picnic Festival in Stradbally, Ireland.

In 2014 a special edition of Marchin' Already was released on a 2 CD edition and a special deluxe 4 disc box set which included a DVD of their live performance at Stirling Castle in 1998. Early 2015 saw the band celebrate their 25th anniversary with some acoustic concerts around the UK. They released a double CD live album which was recorded at the Manchester concert on the tour.

The following year, in 2016, the band announced several special concerts around the UK to celebrate the 20th anniversary of their 1996 hit album Moseley Shoals. They also played several dates in Australia for the first time in their career.

On 22 June 2016, the band officially announced that Scottish musician Raymond Meade would be joining the band permanently on bass, following the departures of both Dan Sealey and Andy Bennett. Meade had already played live with the band since the start of the year.

In November 2018 the band unveiled their first new material in five years since the release of Painting. The four track EP was released on 10-inch vinyl and available only at the band's Christmas shows. The EP received a 5 stars rating from Flick of the Finger, with the publication stating that "Lushly textured, these four compelling and diverse new offerings are nothing short of brilliant."

In 2023 the band released a career-spanning box set entitled Yesterday, Today 1992–2018, which contained all their studio albums and 5 bonus CDs, totalling 230 tracks. The set also came with a 72-page book. A companion vinyl box set was also released, covering their first three studio albums from 1992–1997. In May, a follow-up vinyl set was released, covering the three studio albums released between 1999 and 2003. August saw the release of the final box set, covering the remaining four albums from 2005 to 2013.

== Collaborative work ==
Most band members have supported and collaborated with other artists during the group's existence. Simon Fowler, along with members of Echo & the Bunnymen, Space and the Spice Girls, was part of the supergroup England United who recorded the official song for the England national football team's World Cup campaign in the 1998 FIFA World Cup. "(How Does It Feel to Be) On Top of the World" reached number 9 in the UK Singles Chart. Steve Cradock plays regularly with Paul Weller, as well as with Amy MacDonald.

During their peak (around the time of the Moseley Shoals release) OCS also regularly performed on stage with Noel and Liam Gallagher of Oasis, with whom they were on tour at the time. One particular performance of note with the Gallaghers was a rendition of the Beatles' "Day Tripper", which was included as a live B-side to "The Circle". The song was also included on the B-sides compilation album B-sides, Seasides and Freerides. Noel Gallagher previewed an advance copy of the song during an interview on BBC Radio 1 with DJ Jo Whiley. The interview mainly focused on Oasis's then forthcoming gig in the grounds of Knebworth House, where Ocean Colour Scene was one of the supporting acts. Over 2.6 million people applied for tickets for the shows, making it the most in-demand concert in UK history. There was a combined audience of over 250,000 people.

At a 2011 gig at the University of East Anglia, Ocean Colour Scene was joined on stage by former footballer Dion Dublin, an amateur percussionist, who accompanied them on The Dube, an instrument he invented.

== Discography ==
- Ocean Colour Scene (1992)
- Moseley Shoals (1996)
- Marchin' Already (1997)
- One from the Modern (1999)
- Mechanical Wonder (2001)
- North Atlantic Drift (2003)
- A Hyperactive Workout for the Flying Squad (2005)
- On the Leyline (2007)
- Saturday (2010)
- Painting (2013)

== See also ==
- Concerts at Knebworth House
