= Steve Cradock =

English musician (born 1969)

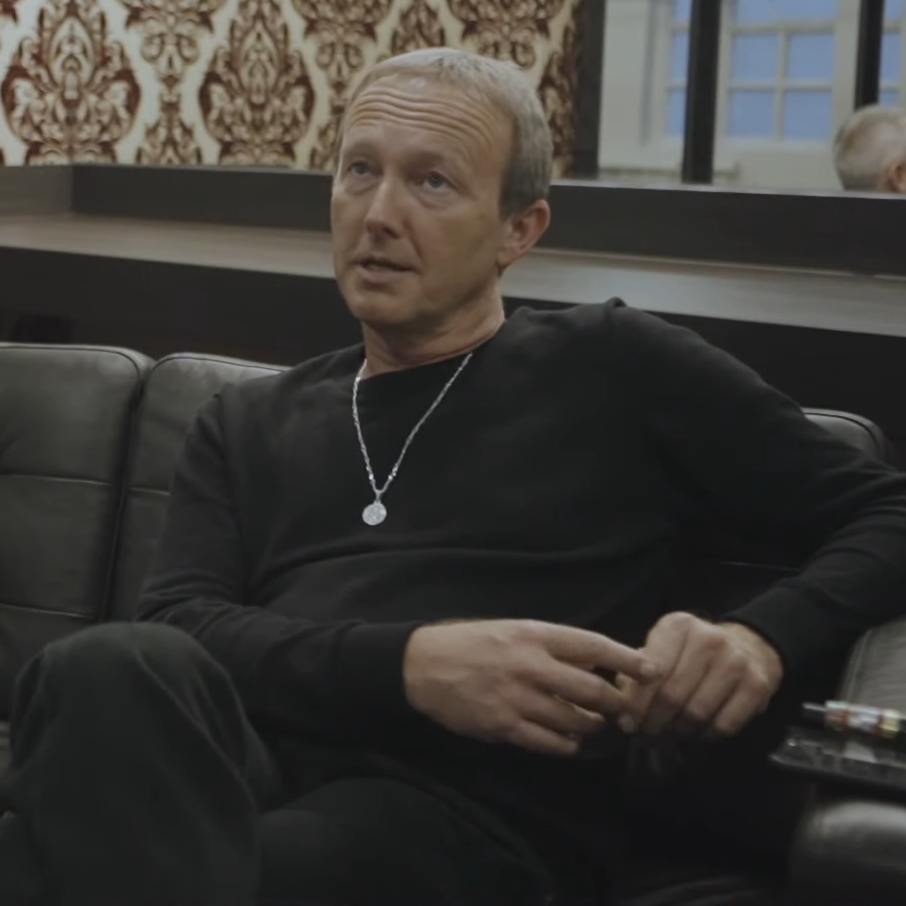
- Cradock in 2019

Background information
- Also known as: Steve Cradock
- Born: Stephen Cradock; 22 August 1969 (age 57); Solihull, West Midlands, England
- Genres: Britpop, rock, mod revival, ska
- Occupation: Musician
- Instruments: Guitar, piano, vocals, bass guitar
- Website: www.stevecradock.com

Stephen Cradock (born 22 August 1969) is an English guitarist, most notable for playing in the rock group Ocean Colour Scene. Cradock also plays the guitar in Paul Weller's band, having appeared on all of Weller's solo records following his self-titled debut solo album. Cradock began playing lead guitar for British ska band The Specials in 2014.

Cradock's playing style has been described as having a "distinctive retro sound". Cradock's influences include The Beatles and The Rolling Stones. Cradock, also known as Fanny or Chopper, also plays keyboards, bass guitar and drums.

== Life and career ==
=== Early years ===
Cradock was born in Solihull, West Midlands; his father Chris Cradock, a police officer, would later become his son's manager. He was educated at Lode Heath School in Solihull.

Cradock formed his first band called The Boys in 1988, with schoolfriends from Solihull. The band played at various mod events around the Midlands with a set consisting mainly of cover songs. Whilst gaining popularity on the Birmingham gig circuit, the band was well received by audiences in various other towns, including London and Bournemouth, and the band released their first three-track EP, Happy Days, on their own label, and the band contributed to a compilation album by the London-based label Unicorn with their song "Going Out". This was followed by the peak of the band's career–a support slot for Steve Marriott at the Irish Centre in Digbeth.

In the late 1980s Cradock met his idol and future mentor, Paul Weller. Despite catching the attention of Polydor and CBS, the band dissolved and Cradock proceeded to form Ocean Colour Scene with Simon Fowler, Damon Minchella and Oscar Harrison.

=== Ocean Colour Scene ===
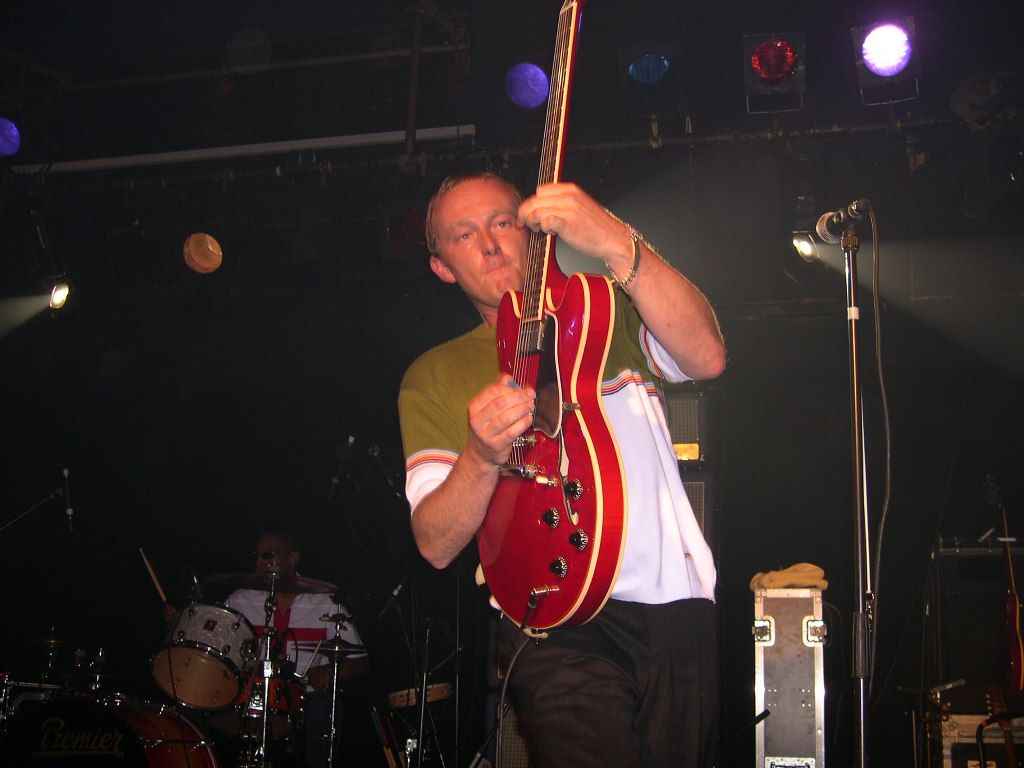
Cradock performing live with Ocean Colour Scene in 2004

Cradock formed Ocean Colour Scene in 1989 with Fowler, Minchella and Harrison after the dissolution of both The Boys and The Fanatics. In 1991 Cradock returned to Weller's London studio with Ocean Colour Scene; Cradock and Weller became friends and Ocean Colour Scene were soon invited to tour with Weller. Within two years of being signed, the band released their debut LP, Ocean Colour Scene, on Fontana Records. Whilst they gained some popularity, the band felt their potential had not been reached. Following Cradock's first full tour with Paul Weller, he self-funded the production of the band's second LP Moseley Shoals.

OCS signed to MCA Records in 1995, and Moseley Shoals sold over 3,000,000 copies worldwide.

=== Paul Weller ===
Cradock joined Weller's band in 1992, having supported him with Ocean Colour Scene. Cradock has appeared on all studio albums by Weller, playing the guitar and other instruments. For the album 22 Dreams, Cradock co-wrote the tracks "Night Lights", "111" and "Song for Alice". In 1999, Weller presented Cradock with a Rickenbacker guitar for his 30th birthday. This guitar can be heard on Ocean Colour Scene's "Free My Name" single from A Hyperactive Workout for the Flying Squad. Weller and Cradock still continue their musical partnership, joining forces whenever Weller takes to the road. Cradock is also credited with co-writing the track "Drifters" on the 2012 release Sonik Kicks – an album that reached no.1 in the UK albums chart. He also took to the stage with Weller to perform tracks from this album for five nights at London's Roadhouse in March 2012. A version of Cradock's "Lay Down Your Weary Burden" (from his 2011 album Peace City West) featured on Weller's 2012 EP When Your Garden's Overgrown.

== Solo career ==
=== The Kundalini Target ===
Cradock announced on the Ocean Colour Scene website that he had begun work on a solo album in early 2008, the recording of which took place at Black Barn Studios in Surrey. During a phone interview on BBC Radio Tees in April 2008, Cradock discussed his solo album and disclosed that he plays all the instruments on the album. Occasionally, Cradock performed his own songs during his tour with Weller during their acoustic gigs of 2007 and 2008. The album features Paul Weller and wife Sally Cradock.

The album title was confirmed as The Kundalini Target; it reached No. 114 in the UK albums chart, 34 in Play.com's charts and 30 in iTunes' charts.

=== Peace City West ===
Cradock's second solo album Peace City West was released on Kundalini Music (a label founded by Cradock and his wife) on 4 April 2011 and features collaborations with James Buckley, from the cult TV show The Inbetweeners, Paul Weller, Sally Cradock, Andy Crofts of The Moons and PP Arnold.

=== Travel Wild – Travel Free ===
This September 2013 release by Steve Cradock was his third solo effort, and also featured his wife Sally on co-production and co-writing. - The album cover features Steve Cradock leading a horse ridden by his wife Sally. The horse, a Welsh Section-D mare named Danaway Memory, was borrowed for the shot by a neighbour of the studio.

=== A Soundtrack to an Imaginary Movie ===
Released in June 2022, Cradock began recording the first tracks in 2020 at his home studio. The instrumental album has jazz, folk, classical and film soundtrack influences. As well as contributions from Sally Cradock, the track Sarcoline features saxophone by the late Brian Travers of UB40.

== Personal life ==
Cradock married Sally Edwards, a record promoter for Ocean Colour Scene, in 1996. The couple have two children. One son performed on stage during Steve Cradock's 2026 tour.
