= Oscar Harrison =

British musician (born 1965)

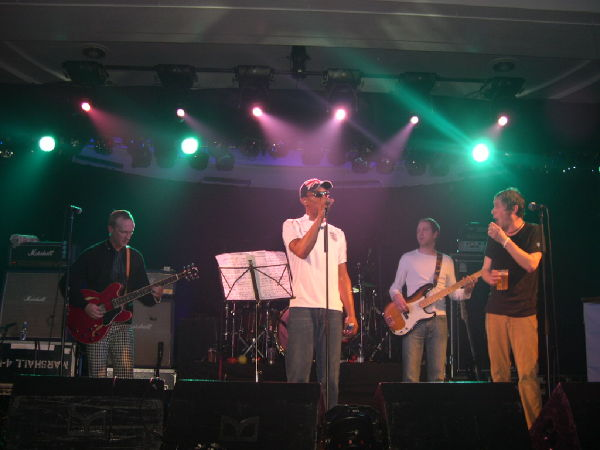
- Harrison singing lead vocals in Ocean Colour Scene's cover of 'My Time' in Leeds

Background information
- Born: Oscar Lloyd Harrison; 18 April 1965 (age 61); Birmingham, England
- Genres: Rock, Britpop, mod revival
- Occupations: Singer-songwriter, musician, multi-instrumentalist
- Instruments: Vocals, drums, piano, keyboards, bass
- Label: Moseley Shoals

Oscar Lloyd Harrison (born 18 April 1965) is a British musician who currently plays drums with Birmingham-based Ocean Colour Scene and the British ska band The Beat. He also plays piano and bass guitar, and occasionally sings lead vocals.

== Life and career ==
=== Early days ===
Harrison's first musical career began with an eleven-piece reggae band called Echo Base. Harrison had stated that he knew he wanted to be a musician from the moment he watched Top of the Pops, an English performance chart show, and that he always admired reggae giant Burning Spear. Echo Base were signed to the same label as fellow Birmingham band UB40 and, despite releasing an album, disbanded after disagreements.

After talking to Echo Base's manager, Harrison met and joined a band called 'The Fanatics', where he played alongside future friend Simon Fowler. He had replaced Caroline Bullock, who angrily responded by "outing" homosexual Fowler to British tabloid paper The Sun a few years later. After playing together for a while, The Fanatics too disbanded, along with another Birmingham rock band called 'The Boys'.

=== Ocean Colour Scene ===
After the disbanding of The Boys and the Fanatics, Fowler and Harrison were part of another, new band called Ocean Colour Scene. This band featured Simon Fowler on lead vocals and acoustic guitar and Oscar Harrison on the drums, with the addition of lead guitar player Steve Cradock and bassist Damon Minchella.

Ocean Colour Scene were hugely successful during the Britpop era. They were signed with record label Phfftt, who were later bought out by larger label Phonogram, before signing with other labels such as Island Records and eventually creating their own label, Moseley Shoals Records.

Harrison played the drums with Ocean Colour Scene as they played alongside artists such as Oasis, Paul Weller and others. Harrison himself said that he looked up to The Who's drummer, Keith Moon.

Harrison has also played a lot of acoustic sessions; playing the piano with vocalist Fowler, as well as singing and playing the guitar for songs such as "Profit in Peace". Harrison composed and arranged all the parts of song "Don't Play", and programmed the instruments onto a Korg synthesizer.

Harrison first sang lead vocals for Ocean Colour Scene on a cover of the Bob Andy song, "My Time".

In 2016, Harrison joined the lineup of Ranking Roger's The Beat as drummer.

== Personal life ==
Harrison was born to Isaac and Susan Harrison. He is the eldest of four children alongside his siblings Rose, Peter and Paul Harrison. Harrison currently resides with a girlfriend in Edgbaston. He has five sons, Leon (percussionist and Drummer of Midlands band The Inner Circles) and Damon, Louie, Isaac and Theo. Three daughters Cherelle, Fern and Ruby.

Harrison said that his biggest ambition is to live on a house boat and he is obsessed with gadgets. He is an Aston Villa football fan and a regular golfer.

== See also ==
- List of reggae musicians
- List of stage names
- Britpop
