= Hammondbeat =

American record label

Hammondbeat Records (founded 2002) is an American record label dedicated to bands and fans of the organ sound. Hammondbeat finds its origins in 1997 as the fan website JTQgroove for the Hammond organ led Acid Jazz band (James Taylor Quartet). Over the first five years, JTQgroove grew as a fan collective that moved well beyond the constraints of one artist, and soon attracted many next-generation organ-centric bands, leading to a recording project with The Link Quartet (Piacenza, Italy). The Link Quartet were greatly influenced by the sound established by JTQ 15 years earlier. Beat.It was the project, and while JTQ influences can be heard, The Link Quartet found themselves leaders with 10 years or more professional experience from each founding member, and Paolo Negri on keys.

Unlike most labels, Hammondbeat doesn't involve a particular genre in the traditional sense, but rather embraces all genres of music which the organ sound has influenced. As such, Hammondbeat's range is ever-expanding. Hammondbeat considers all opportunities both artistic and overtly commercial to be fair game. Hammondbeat controls most of its catalog to be both entertainment and content for the marketing and synchronization world.

In addition to operating as record label, Hammondbeat is also an online community connecting fans to hundreds of organ bands and the indie labels that support them. It includes discographies, downloads, web radio, forum, and a mailing list.

== Discography ==
=== Catalog Titles ===
- 2002 HBR-001 Beat.it CD (The Link Quartet)
- 2003 HBR-002 Wilson Chance: The Sound of Danger CD (Various Artists)
- 2004 HBR-003 Italian Playboys CD (The Link Quartet)
- 2006 HBR-004 Bulletproof Beat CD (The Special Agents)
- 2006 HBR-005 Wit CD (The Yards)
- 2006 HBR-006 Evolution: 1997-2001 CD (The Link Quartet)
- 2006 HBR-007 The Living Eye CD (The Men From S.P.E.C.T.R.E.)
- 2006 HBR-008 Don't Spoil The Soup! CD (Phat Fred)
- 2007 HBR-009 A Bigger Tomorrow CD (Paolo 'Apollo' Negri)
- 2008 HBR-010 The Origin of Captain Hammond CD (Captain Hammond)
- 2008 HBR-011 Fat Lip CD (Fred Leslie's missing Link)
- 2010 HBR-012 The Great Anything CD (Paolo 'Apollo' Negri)
- 2011 HBR-013 4 CD (The Link Quartet)
- 2011 HBR-014 COBOL CD (Paolo 'Apollo' Negri)
- 2014 HBR-015 Trans-mission CD (The Blaxound)
- 2014 HBR-016 Hotel Constellation CD (The Link Quartet & Miss Modus)
- 2014 HBR-017 Hello World CD (Paolo 'Apollo' Negri)

=== Limited Edition Titles ===
- 2005 HBL-001 Oh My! EP CD (The Dansettes)
- 2005 HBL-002 Stinky Stinky EP CD (Fil Lorenz Soul-tet)
- 2006 HBL-003 Scream On! CD (Screamin' Retro)
- 2006 HBL-004 Feed A Fever CD (Baron Samedi Ecstatic Soul Quintet)
- 2006 HBL-005 Decade EP CD (The Link Quartet)
- 2006 HBL-006 On The Outset CD (Nick Rossi Set)
- 2007 HBL-007 ...with the Hammond, in the Beauty EP CD (Leslie Overdrive)
- 2007 HBL-008 Applecore EP UNRELEASED CD / DIGITAL ONLY (Paolo 'Apollo' Negri)
- 2007 HBL-009 Building A Bigger Tomorrow BONUS CD (Paolo 'Apollo' Negri)
- 2008 HBL-010 Searching For A Bit Of Popularity CD (Low Fidelity Jet-Set Orchestra)
- 2008 HBL-011 Sounds From The Kitten Casino CD (Modus)
- 2010 HBL-012 On The One EP CD (Flyjack)

=== 45 RPM ===
- 2007 HB7-01 A Tad Askew b/w Oily 7" (Leslie Overdrive)
- 2007 HB7-02 Bahia Soul b/w Jazz Rocker 7" (Low Fidelity Jet-Set Orchestra)
- 2008 HB7-03 Origin b/w Mercury Wonderland 7" (Captain Hammond vs The Futuro Seven)
- 2008 HB7-04 Lady Day and John Coltrane b/w Hey Bulldog 7" (Tony Face Big Roll Band)
- 2008 HB7-05 Yu Nou Rili (live) b/w Memphis Train (live) 7" (Phat Fred)
- 2008 HB7-06 Paparazzi b/w A Blues For Me 7" (Paolo "Apollo" Negri & Teresa Reeves-Gilmer)
- 2009 HB7-07 Fast Girls & Sexy Cars b/w Drummore 7" (The Link Quartet)
- 2009 HB7-08 DangerBoogaloo b/w Wasabi Sauce 7" (Low Fidelity Jet-Set Orchestra)
- 2009 HB7-09 Brooklyn Groove b/w Brother Lou 7" (Euro Cinema)
- 2009 HB7-10 Lookin Up, Turnin Round b/w Moet Jij Wete 7" (Sven Hammond Soul)
- 2012 HB7-11 Lightswitch b/w Le Cirque du MIDI 7" (Paolo "Apollo" Negri & Milo Scaglioni)

=== Digital Only & Fan Editions CD's ===
- 2004 HBB.001 Pole Position CD-R (Fast 3)
- 2004 HBB.002 Italian Playboys International (EP) CD-R (The Link Quartet)
- 2004 HBB.003 Strudel Girl VS. The New Acid Wave CD-R (The Link Quartet)
- 2005 HBB.004 Mile High Mayhem CD (The Link Quartet)
- 2006 HBB.005 Evolution: 1997-2001 (part 1) (The Link Quartet)
- 2006 HBB.006 Evolution: 1997-2001 (part 2) (The Link Quartet)
- 2007 HBB.007 With the Finger on the Trigger (Men From S.P.E.C.T.R.E.)
- 2007 HBB.008 Sugartown (Men From S.P.E.C.T.R.E.)
- 2007 HBB.009 Never Enough [UNRELEASED] (Ondrej Pivec Organic Quartet)
- 2006 HBB.010 The Grifter (Fast 3)
- 2007 HBB.011 Entering The Timesphere (EP) (Nice Price featuring Paolo 'Apollo' Negri)
- 2007 HBB.012 Long Live The Link (The Link Quartet)
- 2007 HBB.013 Soundsational Movements (Modulo5)
- 2005 HBB.014 Cosmic Candy CD (Captain Hammond)
- 2007 HBB.014 Cosmic Cantina (Captain Hammond)
- 2008 HBB.015 Getup & Groove (The Getup)
- 2008 HBB.016 Stack em High (Max Paparella)
- 2008 HBB.017 Phat Fred Live In Denmark (Phat Fred)
- 2008 HBB.018 The Oppenheimer Transmissions (The Futuro Seven)
- 2008 HBB.019 (I Got) So Much Trouble In My Mind (EP) (Fred Leslie's missing Link)
- 2008 HBB.020 Going Down Slowly (EP) (Fred Leslie's missing Link)
- 2008 HBB.021 Forward (The Yards)
- 2008 HBB.022 Life at Cafe Eric (The Getup)
- 2009 HBB.023 Paolo Apollo Negri's SxSW Odyssey (Paolo 'Apollo' Negri)
- 2011 HBB.024 Diesler vs The Bongolian (EP) (The Link Quartet / Paolo 'Apollo' Negri)
- 2011 HBB.025 Ten-4! (Euro Cinema)
- 2011 HBB.026 Hammondbeat Hi-Fi Sessions, Vol.1 (various artists)
- 2011 HBB.027 Hammondbeat Hi-Fi Sessions, Vol.2 (various artists)
- 2012 HBB.028 Hammond Groovers, Vol.1 (various artists)
- 2012 HBB.029 VocAll (Hammondbeat Profiles Volume 1) (Paolo 'Apollo' Negri)
- 2013 HBB.030 Hammond Groovers, Vol.2 (various artists)
- 2014 HBB.031 A, B & C (Penelope)
- 2014 HBB.032 Crash (Max Paparella)
- 2014 HBB.033 Gumbo Funk CD (Paolo 'Apollo' Negri featuring Noel McKoy)

=== Vibesbeat ===
- 2013 HBV-001 Jackson CD (The Mackay Project)
- 2013 HBV-002 Here's That Rainy Day CD (Thomas Mackay Quintet)

== Links ==
- Hammondbeat Records
- Paolo Apollo Negri
- The Link Quartet
- The Blaxound
- Max Paparella
- Penelope
