= Speak Low (disambiguation) =

"Speak Low" is a 1943 popular song composed by Kurt Weill, with lyrics by Ogden Nash.

Speak Low may also refer to:

- Speak Low (band), a Spanish funk combo
- Speak Low (Walter Bishop Jr. album), 1961
- Speak Low (Patrice Jégou album), 2014
- Speak Low, a 2009 poetry collection by Carl Phillips
- "Speak Low", a 1992 song by George Duke from the album Snapshot
