= New Street Adventure =

English soul band

- Origin: England
- Genre: Indie/British soul
- Years active: 2007–2018, 2024-
- Label: Acid Jazz
- Members: Nick Corbin (guitar, vocals); Ashley Hayden (bass, backing vocals); Billy Farr ( guitar, backing vocals); Ben Wolfe (drums); Max De Lucia (keys)
- Past members: Chris Daykin (Drums; 2007–2008); Robin Langhorn (Bass; 2007–2010); Rooster Robertson (Drums; 2008–2011); Ollie Futcher (Drums; 2011–2014); Charlie Myers (Keys; 2012–2015); Jeremy Paul (Drums; 2014–2015); Billy Lawrence (Guitar; 2012–2013); Carmy Love (backing vocals; 2011–2014); Emma Noble (backing vocals: 2013–2014); Cicely Corbin (backing vocals; 2012); Louie-Ann Miller (backing vocals; 2011); Mariya Brachkove (backing vocals 2012); Harry Ainsworth (guitar; 2011)

New Street Adventure are an English band led by Nick Corbin, with many classic soul influences. Corbin first started the band as a college venture in early 2007, maturing over time to a professional unit. In January 2013, the band was signed to Acid Jazz.

== History ==
Nick Corbin, originally from East Sussex founded the original line-up of New Street Adventure as a three-piece in early 2007 while attending University of Birmingham, taking the name from Birmingham's New Street railway station. The band consisted of Corbin on guitar and vocals, with Chris Daykin and Robin Langhorn, who he had met during Fresher's week, on drums and bass respectively. In March that year they recorded the four track E.P "An Excuse to Talk" at Liverpool Institute of Performing Arts. Over the next year the band recorded more live demos, followed in April 2008 by an EP called Who Beat Up Jimmy Jazz? at Rich Bitch Studios in Selly Oak. By this point Corbin's lyrics had begun to form a social commentary of university life, with particular references to what he saw as a startling class divide amongst fellow students. In 2008, English clothier Ben Sherman began featuring the band on its website and at certain performances, and Ros Robertson became the band's drummer. They then recorded and released a second E.P., Modern Sounds in Rhythm and Blues.

Around 2010 Corbin moved to London and revamped the band's line-up and sound. After initially struggling to find suitable musicians, in January 2011, Corbin met Ashley Hayden who would go on to become the band's bass player but not before the band recorded the E.P Just the Kind of People with British soul singer/producer Noel McKoy, who helped expand their sound deep into more soul territory. McKoy recruited well-known London musicians Ernie McKone (bass), Carl Hudson (keys), Paul Jordanous (trumpet) and Tom White (trombone) to play on the four tracks. At Corbin's request McKoy phoned two former students, Carmella Davis and Louie-Ann Miller, to sing backing vocals on the record. The two would go on to join the band full-time along with lead guitarist Harry Ainsworth, who was shortly replaced by Billy Farr. By this time Ollie Futcher had already replaced Rooster Robertson on drums and the line-up was beginning to solidify.

The EP Say It Like You Mean It was self-released in May 2012 with lead single "Hangin' On/Hangin' Up earning extensive radio play on the Robert Elms show on BBC London. The band subsequently toured the UK for 3 weeks with Corbin's younger sister, Cicely, filling in for the departed Miller on backing vocals. Charlie Myers, a jazz pianist based in Brighton, joined the band for the tour, which was a success, particularly in the North of England and Scotland.

By Autumn of 2012 the band had lost momentum, which resulted in Billy Farr's departure; his last show coming in November, where Eddie Piller offered Corbin the chance to sign to Acid Jazz. In January 2013, the band signed with Acid Jazz Records.

The start of 2013 saw the band spend two weeks at Livingston Studios in Wood Green, where they recorded 13 tracks, all of which would end up on their debut album. Despite excellent performances during the recording process, the final mixes were not satisfactory and so began a frustrating period of six months, during which the band only managed a couple of spot-plays of their free download single "Lucky Lady" on the Craig Charles Funk & Soul show on BBC 6 Music.

The project was rejuvenated late in 2013 when Mitch Ayling, drummer in Essex soul band, The Milk, sent Corbin a remix he had done of "On Our Front Doorstep". Sensing a potential change in fortunes the band asked Mitch to remix the entire album,

On 6 December 2017, the band announced on their Facebook page that their next gig, on 26 January 2018 at 229 The Venue, London, would be their last.

Corbin released the solo album Sweet Escape in 2020. In January 2024 he reformed the band for a tour celebrating the tenth anniversary of No Hard Feelings, and they have continued to tour and record since then.

== Partial discography ==
- An Excuse to Talk (Demo) (2007)
- Who Beat Up Jimmy Jazz? (EP) (2008)
- Modern Sounds in Rhythm and Blues (EP) (2009)
- Just the Kind of People (Demo EP, 4 tracks) (2011)
- Say It Like You Mean It (EP) (2012)
- Lucky Lady (single) (Acid Jazz 2013)
- On Our Front Doorstep (single) (Acid Jazz 2014)
- Be Somebody (single) (Acid Jazz 2014)
- No Hard Feelings (Album) (Acid Jazz 2014)
- The Big AC (single) (Acid Jazz 2015)
- Stubborn Sons (Album) (Acid Jazz 2017)
- What Kind of World? (Album) (Acid Jazz 2025)
- What a Woman (single) (Acid Jazz 2025)
- Didn't I (with Ariadne) (single) (Acid Jazz 2026)
