= High Havoc =

Studio album by Corduroy
- Released: 1993
- Recorded: Summer 1992
- Genre: Acid jazz
- Length: 50:03 (sans track 14)
- Label: Acid Jazz Records
- Producer: Ben Addison & Scott Addison

Corduroy chronology
Dad Man Cat (1992)	High Havoc (1993)	Out of Here (1994)

Singles from High Havoc
- 1. "The Frighteners" Released: 1993; 2. "Something In My Eye" Released: 1993

Professional ratings
Review scores
Source	Rating
Louder Than War	9/10 stars
Select	1/5

High Havoc is the second LP by Corduroy, released by Acid Jazz Records in 1993. Billed as a concept album, it includes several top ten singles on the UK Indie Chart and many favourite Corduroy tunes. The album was reissued on vinyl by Acid Jazz Records in 2018.

== Reception ==
In his review for Louder Than War, Matt Mead states: "The single "London England" became a dancefloor classic in the 1990s, which I’m sure would have influenced Albarn, Coxon, Rowntree and James to ask the fabric four to support Blur at their ground breaking Alexandra Palace concert in 1994". Select rated the album 1/5, saying "Even the most cursory encounter with this rambling muzak would be enough to proclaim Corduroy the most pedestrian dullards on the block. Incidental music for incidental lives."

== Track listing ==
All tracks by Ben Addison, Scott Addison, Richard Searle and Simon Nelson-Smith, except where noted.

1. "High Havoc" – 4:10
2. "London England" – 3:22
3. "The Corduroy Orgasm Club" – 1:46
4. "The Frighteners" – 5:09
5. "You're A Great Way To Fly" – 2:37
6. "Something In My Eye" (Ben Addison, Scott Addison) – 3:23
7. "Lovely, Lonely And Loaded" – 4:05
8. "Breakfast In Love" – 2:48
9. "One Born Every Minute" – 4:50
10. "Follow That Arab" – 4:52
11. "Nobody Move" – 2:28
12. "Very Yeah" – 5:08
13. "Clearing Up Music" – 2:20
14. "10. 28 from Shibuya" - 3:05

== Personnel ==
- Ben Addison - vocals, drums
- Scott Addison - vocals, keyboards, guitar
- Simon Nelson-Smith - guitars
- Richard Searle - bass guitar
- Roger Beaujolais - vibraphone on "Something In My Eye"
- Sherine Abeyratne - vocals on "Something In My Eye"
- Michael Smith - saxophone, flute
- Sid Gould - trumpet
- Dennis Rollins - trombone

== Charts ==
Chart (1994)	Peak position
Australian Albums (ARIA Charts)	82
