= The Broken Vinyl Club =

Welsh indie rock band

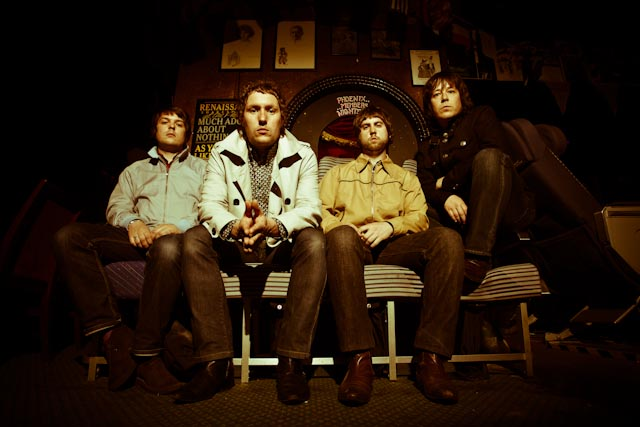

Background information
- Origin: Aberdare, South Wales
- Genres: British rhythm and blues, freakbeat, indie
- Years active: 2009–2013
- Labels: See Monkey Do Monkey Acid Jazz Records
- Past members: Scott Howells; Jamie Taylor; Justin Beynon; Meirion Townsend; Twn Champagne
- Website: MySpace Page

The Broken Vinyl Club were a Welsh 1960s-influenced indie rock band based in Aberdare in South Wales and signed to Acid Jazz Records.

The band were known for their close harmonies and jangly guitar sound and were compared to bands such as the Beatles, the Byrds, the La's and the Kinks. They were often referred to as one of the UK's new breed of mod bands.

The Broken Vinyl Club's original line-up consisted of Scott Howells (vocals, guitar), Justin Beynon (guitar, vocals), Jamie Taylor (bass guitar, vocals) and Meirion Townsend (drums, vocals). Townsend was replaced by former Keys drummer Twm Champagne after leaving the band in early 2013.

== History ==
=== Formation and See Monkey Do Monkey ===
Multi instrumentalists Scott Howells and Meirion Townsend got together at the end of 2008 as a means of using the new studio that Townsend had just finished building in the basement of a tattoo shop in Aberdare. They had originally intended to write and record songs while getting drunk on Friday nights but soon realised that they could have the basis of a decent band and so recruited Justin Beynon, who had been in the relatively successful local band Cripplecreek on lead guitar and Jamie Taylor, who had played with Scott in Black Hand Laser Band on bass.

After a couple of months of solid rehearsals, the band played their first gig at Buffalo in Cardiff in May 2009. They then set about playing as many gigs as possible across South Wales while using Meirion's studio to start recording a debut album. While playing a gig at Ten Feet Tall in Cardiff, the band were spotted by local label See Monkey Do Monkey (home to one of the bands heroes Keys) who asked to sign them on the spot.

=== Pretty Green ===
Shortly after releasing 'I Want You Girl', the video for the song was passed on to Welsh actor Jonny Owen who was so impressed by the band that he then passed it on to some of the contacts he has in the music industry as a result of his internet TV show Svengali.

The band were then asked to play at the launch night for Liam Gallagher's Pretty Green club in Islington, London . The night was attended by Gallagher, as well as his Beady Eye bandmates Gem Archer and Andy Bell, actor Martin Freeman and Acid Jazz Records boss Eddie Piller.

=== Acid Jazz Records ===
The buzz around the band continued to grow with former Creation Records boss Alan McGee announcing, after seeing the band, that they could be massive. Acid Jazz Records then got in touch with the band to ask to use their song "I Want You Girl", as part of a compilation of new mod-inspired bands they were putting together called Hipsters 2. Soon after this the label asked to hear all of the songs they had recorded to date and eventually signed the band on a three-album deal.

The band released their debut single on Acid Jazz "One Way Street" (b/w "Day Too Long") in August 2011. Their debut album The Broken Vinyl Club was released in October 2011.

=== Stereophonics support and "Diamonds in Her Eyes" ===
Shortly after the release of their debut album, the band were personally asked by fellow Welshman Kelly Jones to support his band Stereophonics at one of three Christmas shows they had lined up at London's Shepherd's Bush Empire. They were also asked to support them at a warm-up for those shows at Bournemouth's O2 Academy.

Following the success of those shows, the band released a second single on Acid Jazz, the non-album track "Diamonds in Her Eyes", in February 2012.

=== Disbandment and Svengali soundtrack ===
Founder member Meirion Townsend announced that he was leaving the band in early 2013 and the remaining three members set about finding a replacement, eventually settling on former Keys drummer Twm Champagne. The band continued to gig throughout the year but decided to call it a day at the end of that year, playing their final gig at Clwb Ifor Bach in Cardiff on 23 November 2013.

Despite the split, the band's single 'I Want You Girl' was used on the Svengali movie soundtrack, alongside artists such as Miles Kane, Jake Bugg, The Stone Roses and The Who.

== Personnel ==
=== Former members ===
- Scott Howells – lead vocals, guitar (2009–2013)
- Justin Beynon – lead guitar (2009–2013)
- Jamie Taylor – bass, backing vocals (2009–2013)
- Meirion Townsend – drums, percussion (2009–2012)
- Twm Champagne – drums, percussion (2013)

== Discography ==
The Broken Vinyl Club

Studio album by The Broken Vinyl Club
- Released: October 2011
- Recorded: 2009–2011
- Genre: Indie, rock
- Label: Acid Jazz
- Producer: The Broken Vinyl Club

=== Albums ===
The Broken Vinyl Club The band's self-produced eponymous debut was recorded in their Aberdare studio and released on Acid Jazz Records in October 2011.

All songs written and composed by Howells/ The Broken Vinyl Club except tracks 5 and 12 (Beynon/ The Broken Vinyl Club)

No.	Title	Length
1.	"Every Inch"
2.	"She Just Keeps Me Waiting"
3.	"All In Your Head"
4.	"Hiding From The Truth"
5.	"One Way Street"
6.	"She's Tired"
7.	"I Want You Girl"
8.	"Horror Show"
9.	"In My Mind"
10.	"You Help Me"
11.	"Spin Around"
12.	"Brave Captain"

=== Singles ===
- "I Want You Girl" / "In My Mind" (See Monkey Do Monkey, 2010)
- "One Way Street" (Acid Jazz Records, 2011)
- "Diamonds In Her Eyes" (Acid Jazz Records, 2012)
