= Apple Green =

Apple Green may refer to:

- Apple green, a colour
- "Apple Green", a song by indie rock band Milltown Brothers from the 1991 album Slinky
- "Apple Green", a song by Mother Earth from the 1993 acid rock album The People Tree
- "Apple Green", a song by traditional pop singer June Valli (1960)
- Ken Green (basketball, born 1959), who went by the nickname “Apple” Green

== See also ==
- Applegreen, Irish operator of filling stations
- Amy Applegren, baseball player
