= Return of the Fabric Four =

Studio album by Corduroy
- Released: 25 May 2018
- Recorded: May–November 2017
- Studio: 2Bit Recordings, London
- Genre: Acid jazz
- Length: 32:42
- Label: Acid Jazz
- Producer: Corduroy, Andrew Jones

Corduroy chronology
Clik! (1999)	Return of the Fabric Four (2018)

Singles from Return of the Fabric Four
- 1. "Saturday Club" Released: 2018; 2. "Magic Mountain" Released: 2018

Return of the Fabric Four is the sixth album by the London-based acid jazz band Corduroy. It was released on Acid Jazz Records in 2018.

== Reception ==
Professional ratings
Review scores
Source	Rating
Record Collector	4/5 stars

Record Collector awarded the album with 4 stars and in its review, Lois Wilson called the record "another groovy (imaginary) soundtrack to a 1960s spy film, part-nostalgia, part-originality, wholly fun". In their top 200 albums of 2018, Louder Than War voted Return of the Fabric Four at No. 83. In an online video premiere of the single "Saturday Club" for Louder Than War, Ioan Humphreys states: "Returning after a nearly-two-decade hiatus, the band certainly seem like they are having a right laugh in this renaissance of their career".

== Track listing ==
All tracks are written by Ben Addison, Scott Addison, Richard Searle and Simon Nelson-Smith.

No.	Title	Length
1.	"Magic Mountain"	3:01
2.	"The Cleaner"	3:06
3.	"Return of the Fabric Four"	2:58
4.	"Sambarella"	2:29
5.	"Blackmail"	2:16
6.	"Snake Appeal"	2:51
7.	"Saturday Club"	2:51
8.	"Waltz For Christoph"	2:55
9.	"Sign of the Cat"	2:34
10.	"The Slingbacks Solution"	2:52
11.	"Jumping Spider"	1:38
12.	"Botany Five-O"	3:05

== Personnel ==
- Ben Addison – vocals, drums, sleeve design and illustration
- Scott Addison – vocals, keyboards
- Simon Nelson-Smith – guitars
- Richard Searle – bass guitar
