= Dollars (soundtrack) =

1972 soundtrack album

- 1972 album cover

Soundtrack album by Quincy Jones with appearances by Little Richard Roberta Flack Doug Kershaw Featuring the Don Elliott Voices
- Released: 1972
- Recorded: 1971
- Genre: Film score
- Label: Reprise
- Producer: Quincy Jones

Quincy Jones chronology
| They Call Me Mister Tibbs! (1970) | Dollars (1972) | Smackwater Jack (1971) |

CD cover

Dollars is the soundtrack album to the 1971 movie of the same name, also known as $, Dollar$, $ (Dollars) or The Heist (in the UK), written and directed by Richard Brooks and starring Warren Beatty and Goldie Hawn. The soundtrack, originally issued on Reprise Records, is composed and produced by Quincy Jones, and features performances by Little Richard, Roberta Flack and Doug Kershaw. Throughout the album, the Don Elliott Voices provide harmony vocal background to otherwise instrumental pieces.

== History ==
Jones, who was at the time under contract to A&M Records, was given permission by A&M Records to become involved with the soundtrack. Little Richard, Roberta Flack and Doug Kershaw were all artists with the Warner Bros. Records/Reprise group.

The film was released in December 1971, followed by the early 1972 release of the soundtrack album. Jones' "Money Runner", was the promoted single from the album, released concurrently with the film, in December 1971. "Money Is", written by Jones and sung by Little Richard, was the B-side.> The album was released by Warner Bros. Records on CD in 2001 and then re-released on CD in 2008, coinciding with the DVD release of the film.

== Reception ==
Professional ratings
Review scores
| Source | Rating |
|---|---|
| AllMusic | 3.5/5 stars |

AllMusic's Jason Birchmeier said "Jones works with well-known vocalists Little Richard and Roberta Flack, which may interest some listeners. But, ultimately, it's Jones' compositions that carry the most weight on this soundtrack and surely the reason to give this soundtrack a listen. It's not worth going out of your way to get, though. Jones released a lot of phenomenal music in his time, and though this is impressive, it's one of his less interesting projects. It'll be best enjoyed by fanatics and completists". In contrast, Score, Baby!, a website devoted to reviews of "cult soundtracks of the 60s. 70s and beyond" described the Dollar$ soundtrack as "essential", being an "inventive blend of experimental jazz and rhythm & blues". It was further described as being comparable to Jones' score for They Call Me Mr. Tibbs, in terms of being among Jones' "best funky soundtrack work". The Vinyl Factory called it "a slightly ramshackle record, rich with sudden soulful moods and slam-dunk funk. With its Rhodes pianos and wacka-wacka guitars, the album oozes smooth ‘70s". The track "Rubber Ducky" was used as a main theme of the Filipino sitcom John en Marsha.

The soundtrack remains of ongoing interest to later artists. Gang Starr sampled "Snow Creatures", while Mobb Deep sampled "Kitty With The Bent Frame" La Mongoose Band, a Spanish funk band, covered "Money Runner". Acid jazz band Corduroy covered "Money Is" on their 1992 debut album, Dad Man Cat and on their 1994 album Quattro - Live In Japan

== Track listing ==
1. Money Is (Vocal by Little Richard) 4:28
2. Snow Creatures 3:16
3. Rubber Ducky 1:10
4. Redeye Runnin' Train (Solo Violin by Doug Kershaw) 2:54
5. Shady Lady 1:06
6. Money Runner 3:08
7. When You're Smiling (The Whole World Smiles With You) (End Title) (Shay, Fisher and Goodwin, arr. Jones) (Vocal by Roberta Flack with the Don Elliott Voices) 1:45
8. Do It - To It (Vocal by Little Richard) 2:51
9. Candy Man 3:11
10. Passin' the Buck 1:36
11. Kitty With the Bent Frame 2:13
12. Brook's 50 Cent Tour [Main Title Collage] (Vocal by Little Richard) 9:35

== Credits ==
- Arthur Adams Guitar
- Elek Bacsik Guitar
- Paul Beaver Keyboards
- Ray Brown Bass
- Larry Bunker Percussion
- Don Elliott Voices
- Gene Estes Percussion
- Victor Feldman Percussion
- Clare Fischer Keyboards
- Elliott Fisher Violin
- Roberta Flack Vocals, Performer
- Eric Gale Guitar
- Milt Holland Percussion
- Paul Humphrey Drums
- Anthony Jackson Electric Bass
- Tommy Johnson Tuba
- Quincy Jones Piano, Trumpet, Composer, Conductor
- Artie Kane Keyboards
- Doug Kershaw Violin, Performer
- Michael Lang Keyboards
- Little Richard Piano, Vocals, Performer
- Bill Plummer Keyboards, Sitar
- Bobbye Porter Percussion
- Billy Preston Keyboards
- Chuck Rainey Electric Bass
- Jerome Richardson Woodwind
- Ron Tutt Drums
- David T. Walker Guitar
