= MONC =

MONC or Monc can refer to:

- Metropolitan Opera National Company, an American opera company from 1965 to 1967
- Men of North Country, an Israeli soul band
- Monchio delle Corti (called "Monc" in Parmigiano), a commune in Italy
- Misspelling of monk, or a person who practices religious ascetism
