= Dad Man Cat =

Studio album by Corduroy
- Released: 1992
- Recorded: 1992
- Genre: Acid jazz
- Length: 51:56 (sans track 12)
- Label: Acid Jazz Records
- Producer: Corduroy & Eddie Piller

Corduroy chronology
Dad Man Cat (1992)	High Havoc (1993)

Professional ratings
Review scores
Source	Rating
AllMusic	3/5 stars
Louder Than War	9/10 stars

Dad Man Cat was the first LP by Corduroy to be released by Acid Jazz Records, in 1992. It is primarily an instrumental album, with what became the classic Corduroy sound. The album was reissued on vinyl by Acid Jazz Records in 2018.

== Reception ==
AllMusic awarded the album with three stars and its review by Jason Ankeny describes the album as: "The lounge-kitsch debut from Corduroy spotlights the group's blend of jazz and funk sounds". In his review for Louder Than War, Matt Mead states: "Dad Man Cat takes a stab at 1960’s Michael Caine, Alfie and Blowup with its revved up organ groves, silky bass smooth lines, fast moving guitar riffs and drums that sound, at times, to being played at 10,000 mph".

== Track listing ==
1. "Chowdown" (Ben Addison, Nelson-Smith, Richard Searle) – 4:25
2. "Long Cool & Bubbly" (Corduroy) – 4:23
3. "The Girl Who Was Death" (Addison, Scott Addison, Nelson-Smith, Searle) – 4:44
4. "How To Steal The World" (Corduroy) – 4:02
5. "Frug In G Major" (Addison, Nelson-Smith, Searle) – 4:43
6. "Electric Soup" (Corduroy) – 5:00
7. "Ponytail" (Corduroy) – 4:58
8. "Harry Palmer" (Addison, Addison, Nelson-Smith, Searle) – 4:08
9. "E-Type" (Addison) – 4:29
10. "Skirt Alert" (Corduroy) – 3:31
11. "Six Plus One" (Addison, Addison, Nelson-Smith, Searle) – 3:02
12. "Money Is" (Quincy Jones) – 4:37

== Personnel ==
- Scott Addison – vocals, keyboards
- Ben Addison – drums
- Simon Nelson-Smith – guitar
- Richard Searle – bass guitar
- Robin Lurie - percussion
- Corduroy – producer
- John Laker – engineer
- Eddie Piller – producer
