= Brownstock Music Festival =

Music festival in Chelmsford, England

The Brownstock Music Festival is a music festival held annually at Morris Farm in Chelmsford, Essex. The festival, held over three days annually since 2005, attracts thousands of visitors each year. It was operated by Count of Ten Ltd (Y Not Festival, Truck Festival, Tramlines) which is now owned by Global Radio. The festival started small, but now has 4 separate stages and 23 festival areas. The festival takes pride in its independent and homegrown roots. For example, Aberdeen Angus beef from the farm being the only beef you can buy at the festival and the family hand-make many of the festival decorations.

The 2016 Festival took place on the weekend of the 8–10 July. Over the weekend the festival saw headline sets from Tinie Tempah, Mark Ronson, Kelis, + another 150 acts over the 3 days.

== 2005–2008 ==
The first three Brownstock Festivals were private family events hosting local bands that were unsigned at the time, including The Brights, Darwyn, These New Puritans and Matt Cardle.

== 2009 ==
In 2009 the Brown Family applied for and were granted an official entertainments licence by Essex County Council and the event became public for the first time. It was headlined by The Holloways and Finley Quaye.

== 2010 ==
The 2010 festival grew to 2 stages – a dance stage and a main stage. The festival was also covered by BBC Introducing for the first time. It was headlined by The Reverend and the Makers and Dan le sac vs Scroobius Pip.

== 2011 ==
The 2011 festival had the largest number of visitors to date, reaching the licence capacity of 4999. The 2011 festival had 5 stages and over 100 acts during the weekend. The stages included a Piano Bar, Dance Tent, Main Stage, Silent Disco and Comedy Stage. It was headlined by Pendulum, Example, Athlete and Ms. Dynamite

== 2012 ==
The 2012 festival took place on 31 August–2 September 2012. The festival saw the return of The Piano Bar as well as new additions The Treehouse Stage and The Stumble Inn. the festival was headlined by Labrinth, Zane Lowe, The Futureheads and Nero.

== 2013 ==
The 2013 festival took place on 30 August–1 September 2013. The festival grew by an extra 2000 people and was headlined by DJ Yoda, Professor Green and The Fratellis.

Friday 30 August
Main Stage	The Good Shed
DJ Yoda; Grizzly Bear; Creme De Chevre; Stealing Signs; Hamptons	Liam Bone; TC; Scoundrel; M1

Saturday 31 August
Main Stage	The Good Shed
Professor Green; Tom Odell; Devlin; Delilah; The Milk; Missing Andy; F.O.X; Bambi; Disemboweled By Sharks; Glenn Godfrey; Ordinary Noise	Mark Ronson; Benga & Youngman; Jaguar Skills; Doorly; Suis Generis; The Captain; Woody Two Shoes; Excel; Shuffle

Sunday 1 September
Main Stage	The Good Shed
The Fratellis; The Pigeon Detectives; Hadouken! King Charles; Man Get Out; Arthur Walwin; Micro Jupiter; Josephine and The Artizans; Frett; Killatrix; Ellekaye	Duke Dumont; Doorly; Second City; Roni Size; Beardy Man; Krafty Kuts; COMEDIAN Junior Simpsons; COMEDIAN Mike Mcclean; COMEDIAN Paul Mccaffrey

== 2014 ==
The 2014 festival took place on 29–31 August 2013. Celebrating its 10th Birthday the festival was headlined by Dizzee Rascal, De La Soul and Razorlight.

Friday 29 August
Main Stage	The Good Shed
Dizzee Rascal; Cuban Brothers; Grizzly Bearz; Creme De Chévre	P Money; Liam Bone; DJ Cable; Panda; Co-Jay

Saturday 30 August
Main Stage	The Good Shed
De La Soul; Roots Manuva; Chloe Howl; Goldie Lookin Chain; Josh Record; Ted Zed; The Feud; Tina V New Street Adventure; Cable Street Collective; Mok; The Show	DJ EZ; Claude Von Stroke; Route 94; Doorly; Maribou State; Jack Beats; Mak & Pasteman; Nimblefingerz; Kaptain; Woody; Dev; K-Kong; Undy & Carter; Mirror City

Sunday 31 August
Main Stage	The Good Shed
Razorlight; The Feeling; Bipolar Sunshine; The Milk; Nothing but Thieves; Young Kato; Dexters; M+A; Frett; Stax Revue; The Kings Parade	Pendulum (DJ Set); Sigma; Shy FX; Matrix & Futurebound; Scoundrel; Shuffle; Jammy; The Comedy Club
