= Out of Here (Corduroy album) =

Studio album by Corduroy
- Released: 1994
- Studios: Acid Jazz Studios; Real World Studios
- Genre: Acid jazz
- Length: 47:18
- Label: Acid Jazz Records
- Producers: Ben Addison, Scott Addison

Corduroy chronology
High Havoc (1993)	Out of Here (1994)	The New You! (1997)

Singles from Out of Here
- 1. "Mini" Released: 1994; 2. "Motorhead/London England" Released: 1994

Professional ratings
Review scores
Source	Rating
AllMusic	3/5 stars
Select	2/5
Louder Than War	9/10 stars

Out of Here is the third album by the London-based acid jazz band Corduroy, released in 1994.

The album reached No. 73 in the UK Albums Chart in October 1994. The single "Mini" reached No. 76 in the UK Singles Chart and has been included on many Acid Jazz compilation albums. The album also features a cover of Lemmy's Motorhead, which reached No. 82 in the UK Singles Chart. The album was reissued on vinyl by Acid Jazz Records in 2018.

== Reception ==
AllMusic awarded the album 3 stars. Clark Collis from Select rated the album 2 out of 5, calling "Motorhead" "rather excellent", but saying "Other than that, it's difficult not to concur with the band's obvious wish that they'd been around 20 years ago. And not bothering us now." In his review for Louder Than War, Matt Mead states: "Out of Here features mostly full vocal songs, brothers Addison leading the way here with their Stevie Wonder/Manfred Mann type duel vocals", while he describes the single "Mini" as "a bonafide cult classic tune".

== Track listing ==
All tracks are written by Addison, Addison, Nelson-Smith and Searle, except where noted.

No.	Title	Writer(s)	Length
1.	"Don't Wait for Monday"		4:28
2.	"Practise What You Preach"		4:19
3.	"Red Mercury"		3:00
4.	"End of the Rainbow"		4:07
5.	"Out of Here"		3:51
6.	"The Diceman"		3:34
7.	"Magic Carpet"		3:46
8.	"January Woman"		4:27
9.	"Mini"		4:00
10.	"Along the Rooftops"		2:55
11.	"Ayrton Senna"		3:22
12.	"Motorhead"	Lemmy Kilminster	2:26

All tracks are written by Addison, Addison, Nelson-Smith and Searle, except where noted.

Japanese edition bonus tracks
No.	Title	Length
13.	"Goodbye" (spelled "Good Bye")	3:04
14.	"Paper Money"	4:09
15.	"Simon's Tune"	3:14

== Personnel ==
Corduroy

- Ben Addison – vocals, drums
- Scott Addison – vocals, keyboards
- Simon Nelson-Smith – guitars
- Richard Searle – bass guitar

== Chart positions ==
=== Album charts ===
Year	Title	Chart	Peak position
1994	"Out of Here"	UK Albums Chart	73

=== Single charts ===
Year	Title	Chart	Peak position
1994	"Mini"	UK Singles Chart	76
1994	"Motorhead"/"London England"	UK Singles Chart	82
