= Clik! (Corduroy album) =

Studio album by Corduroy
- Released: 4 October 1999
- Genre: Acid jazz, drum and bass
- Length: 49:58
- Label: Big Cat Records
- Producer: Rob Playford

Corduroy chronology
The New You! (1997)	Clik! (1999)	Return of the Fabric Four (2018)

Singles from Clik!
- 1. "Moshi Moshi" Released: 1999; 2. "Thing for Your Love" Released: 1999

Clik! is the fifth album by the London-based acid jazz band Corduroy. It was released on Big Cat Records in 1999.

The album featured a sound that was influenced by drum and bass and was produced by Rob Playford. The track "Moshi Moshi" was released as a single and appeared in the soundtrack (closing credits) of the 2002 film Ted Bundy.

== Track listing ==
No.	Title	Music	Length
1.	"Moshi Moshi"	Ben Addison, Scott Addison	2:58
2.	"Goddam"	Addison, Addison	2:58
3.	"Future High Street"	Richard Searle, Rob Playford	7:39
4.	"Paddy & Keir"	Addison, Addison, Simon Nelson-Smith	6:50
5.	"Thing For Your Love"	Playford	3:50
6.	"The Lawgiver Bleeds! (The Hasslein Curve Mix)"	Addison, Addison	4:24
7.	"Clik!"	Nelson-Smith	1:46
8.	"Safety Light"	Addison, Searle, Addison	4:22
9.	"The Addison Tapes"	Addison, Playford, Addison	5:31
10.	"Play Loud"	Corduroy, Playford	3:30
11.	"New Seeker"	Addison, Searle, Addison, Nelson-Smith	5:59

== Personnel ==
- Ben Addison – vocals, drums, arrangements
- Scott Addison – vocals, keyboards, arrangements
- Simon Nelson-Smith – guitars, sitar, arrangements
- Richard Searle – bass guitar, arrangements
- Angie Brown – vocals
- Billie Godfrey – vocals
- Wendi Batt – vocals
- Vicky Richardson – vocals
- Carrie Grant – vocals
