= Richard Searle =

English guitarist (born 1963)

- Born: 10 July 1963 (age 63); London, England
- Genres: New wave music; acid jazz
- Occupations: Musician; songwriter; author
- Instrument: Bass guitar
- Years active: 1986–present

Richard Searle (born 10 July 1963) is a 1960s-influenced bass guitarist, who was a member of Doctor and the Medics in 1986, when they were reaching number one in the pop charts.

== Early life ==
Searle was born on 10 July 1963 in London.

== Career ==
=== After Doctor and the Medics ===
Searle left Doctor and the Medics in 1990. He appeared in two different line-ups of the Brit-pop band Boys Wonder, both before and after they were dropped by Sire Records in the late 1980s.

A co-founder of the acid jazz band Corduroy in 1991, named by manager, Alex Bienkov, Searle's bass guitar playing style was foremost in the funky punky sound of the new mod outfit.

Corduroy was a four-piece band based in south east London, formed with twins Ben and Scott Addison, formerly of Boys Wonder. It was built heavily around the style of a local instrumental jazz band, led by guitarist Simon Nelson-Smith, who completed the Corduroy line-up. The band released three albums on Eddie Piller's Acid Jazz Records: Dad Man Cat, High Havoc and Out of Here. They proved a popular live attraction (Modspeed(2011)} and gained a healthy following in Japan (Modspeed(2011)), making the first of several trips there in 1993. In 1994, they recorded a live album, Quattro – Live in Japan.

After leaving Acid Jazz Records they signed to Big Cat Records/V2, releasing two further albums, The New You! and the Rob Playford-produced Clik!.

Clik! failed to chart and Corduroy was dropped by the label in 1999 after which the band split up. The group reformed in 2018 and released Return of the Fabric Four on Acid Jazz Records.

Searle played as a session-man with various bands during the early 2000, including The Freestylers, Soul Hooligan, Chris Difford and Mother Earth. He produced others, including Smashing Time, and recorded with the Australian grunge band The Standing Eight Counts and Lord Large. Lord Large and Dean Parrish's northern soul record, "Left Right and Centre", written by Paul Weller, features Searle's distinctively flamboyant style. He subsequently appeared on stage at The 100 Club with the 1960s mod legends Sharon Tandy and The Fleur De Lys.

Searle published written works in 2010. His first novel, The Absurdist is described as "A light-hearted, science-fictional tale about the illusionary nature of reality, lethal cocktails, hairy heroes, unrequited love and wasp hammers. Rude and irreverent, this funny philosophical caper about two young scam-artists caught up in unusual events, features the prettiest of girls, silliest of toys, quantum physics and giant space propellers in an adventure of absurd proportions,"{(Modspeed(2010)}. A collection of humorous drawings, Sketchistentialism, which followed in 2011, is described as being 'oddly philosophical and blatantly daft' {(Modspeed(2011)}. And, in 2014, a memoir came about his misadventures in Doctor and The Medics The Memoirs of Damage & Vom which features a foreword by The Medics drummer Vom a.k.a. Stephen Ritchie.

=== Wet Dog ===
In 2005, Searle co-formed the band Wet Dog. Wet Dog is an international group featuring Stephen 'Vom' Ritchie from the renowned German rockers Die Toten Hosen. Ritchie played with Searle in Doctor and the Medics. Wet Dog also includes Anna Donarski.

"Fancy You", the first release by Wet Dog, appeared on an Acid Jazz Records compilation called Old School New Cool 2 in 2005.

The band's first album Perfect Crime was released through Drumming Monkey Records / Rough Trade in August 2007 in Germany. It has 14 tracks, covering such styles as funk, punk, pop, rock and soul. A single, "Heart", was released from the album.

Wet Dog are members of the mysterious Bohemian Underground Movement (B.U.M.), the umbrella name used by Searle for his various and mischievous pop art projects. The name came from writing BUM in the sand for puerile and mischievous effect.

The first B.U.M. track,"I'm Afraid of the Man in the Pasty Shop", was recorded entirely over the phone from Cornwall and mixed in the B.U.M. studio weeks later. It appears on the Acid Jazz Record compilation, The New Testament of Folk.

There have been several Bohemian Underground Movement releases, mostly through Acid Jazz Records.

== Discography ==
- Corduroy Boy – 'The very best of the Bohemian Underground Movement'. Acid Jazz Records AJXD121.
- Wet Dog – 'Perfect Crime'. Drumming Monkey Records DRUM02.

compilation contributions

- Jazzlolly – 'Jazzlolly'. Exile on Hammond St. Acid Jazz Records AJXCD158.
- Plumpadellic – 'Plump Funk'. Totally Wired Vol3.Old School New Cool. AJXCD/LP152.
- Groovy Ruben – 'The Woeful Tale of Shakes Magoo'; Templar – 'Quarter To Now. on Sugarlumps AJXCD/LP161.
- Wicca's World – 'Psycles'; The Jugs – 'I'm Afraid of the Man in the Pasty Shop' on The New Testament of Folk AJXCD163.
- Naked Cake – 'Nightclub Libel'; Wet Dog – 'Fancy You' on Old School New Cool 2 AJXCD175.
- The James Coburn Cool – 'Juicer'; Flying Pudding – 'Watching The Machine'; nut – 'The Beetle Makes Noise on Wet Grass'; The Mauve (featuring Monique Maasen)- 'Safety Lite'; Jenson Interceptor – 'Fetch The Stick'; Kitchener: 'The Magic Loungabout on Sugarlumps 2 AJXCD/LP187.
- Soldiers of Soul – 'Raw'; The Pyes – 'Toss & Pot'. on Hammond Street 3 AJXCD/LP195.
- Danger Mod – Theodalight 9; Illusion of Groove – 'Ghost Trip' on Hammond Street 4 Acid Jazz Records AJXCD217.
- The JugZ – 'Got Gas', Thrush – 'London Zen', Action Band – 'White Elephant', The Runcible Spoon – 'Hallucination Train' Sugarlumps 3. Acid Jazz Records. AJXCD/LP214.
- The Solomonics – 'Blanket of Secrecy'. Hipsters 2. Acid Jazz Records. AJXCD255.
- Executive Sweet – 'Saucy and French'. Totally Wired 21. Acid Jazz Records. AJXCD239.
- Wet Dog – 'Perfect Crime'. Hipsters 3. Acid Jazz Records. AJXCD/LP287.

Searle's unreleased compositions are available through the company Sync Master.

== Bibliography ==
- Searle, Richard (10 June 2011). Sketchistentialism (paperback). lulu.com. ISBN 978-1-4477-3529-8.
- Searle, Richard (16 June 2014). The Memoirs of Damage & Vom (Misadventures in Doctor and The Medics) (paperback). lulu.com (published 16 July 2014). ISBN 978-1-291-90940-1.
- Searle, Richard (14 August 2014). The Absurdist (paperback). lulu.com. ISBN 978-1-4467-5722-2.
