= Ebony Alleyne =

- Born: 1982 or 1983
- Origin: London, England
- Genres: Soul, R&B
- Occupation: Singer
- Instrument: Vocals
- Years active: 2000s
- Label: Expansion Records

Ebony Alleyne is an English R&B and soul singer.

== Career ==
Ebony Alleyne was signed to Sony Music at the age of 19 as a singer-songwriter. After much collaboration, the label found that they could not pigeon hole her style into the regular R&B approach for which they were known. Producers Ian Levine and Clive Scott were brought in to collaborate with Alleyne's style. Both felt that they should aim for a Dionne Warwick-Burt Bacharach approach - Alleyne penned the lyrics to "Walk Away and Never Look Back" with the Levine and Scott team. On the basis of this collaboration, Sony granted a £150,000 budget to produce an album with a full orchestra (sixty strings, thirty brass). "Walk Away and Never Look Back" sneak-previewed at a Togetherness soul weekend in 2002 and created further interest - three 7" vinyl singles were pressed in a limited edition on the old soul label Okeh Records. In 2003, just as the album was ready to go into press, Sony Records underwent a management reshuffle. One track "All the Love in the World" cropped up on Levine's Northern Soul 2004.

In early 2007, however, Expansion Records bought the rights to the album, and the Alleyne, Levine and Scott team returned to the studio to record one new track, "You Caught Me Off Guard", and added it to the track listing. The album Never Look Back was finally released in June 2007; launched at a release party at the Jazz Café in Camden Town. The album was released in Japan in late September with five bonus tracks, including a remix of "You Caught Me Off Guard". Alleyne recorded three new tracks - "Mister Magic Man", a duet with Noel McKoy "Special Delivery", and "Have a Little Faith in Me" for Levine's album Northern Soul 2007 and another track - "Whistle for a Ride" - for Disco 2008.

One of Alleyne's unreleased songs, "Like a Lady" (scheduled for inclusion on the 2003 album) was re-recorded with The X Factor artists Voices With Soul for Northern Soul 2007 and became a hit on YouTube with more than 40,000 views and subsequently released a download single on iTunes.

She has been represented by New Vision Arts Management.

== Discography ==
=== Albums ===
- Never Look Back (Expansion Records, June 2007)

=== Singles ===
- "Walk Away and Never Look Back" / "Count the Days" (Okeh Records, 2002)
- "My Man" / "Touching the Sky" (Okeh, 2002)
- "Second Look" / "In Love With a Stranger" (Okeh, 2002)
