= Mother Earth (British band) =

English acid jazz band

- Origin: London, England
- Genres: Soul-rock, jazz-rock, acid jazz
- Years active: 1991–1996
- Labels: Acid Jazz Records
- Past members: Matt Deighton; Bryn Barklam; Neil Corcoran; Chris White; Shauna Green; Marie Jamille; Stephen Bunn
- Website: myspace.com/motherearthacidjazz

Mother Earth were an English acid jazz outfit based in London. The band members were Matt Deighton on guitar and vocals, Bryn Barklam on Hammond organ, Chris White on drums and Neil Corcoran on bass. Shauna Green was the lead singer on the first album. Prior to their debut live performance, where they played alongside another debutant band Jamiroquai, they started out as a studio project in 1991 with Paul Weller (on "Almost Grown"), James Taylor of the James Taylor Quartet and Simon Bartholomew from the Brand New Heavies as contributors.

They released three studio albums and one live album. After they disbanded in 1996, two retrospective albums were released in 2001 and 2004.

== Subsequent activities ==
Deighton subsequently played guitar for Paul Weller's band, and played rhythm guitar in Oasis when Noel Gallagher left mid-tour in 2000.

Since 1996, Matt Deighton has released several critically acclaimed solo-albums.

Bryn Barklam went on to record with The Chords and play organ for the Buzzcocks at the Sex Pistols reunion gig at Finsbury Park. His current band is an instrumental trio consisting of organ, drums and guitar, and is named Captain Hammond.

== Discography ==
=== Albums ===
- Stoned Woman (4 April 1992) Acid Jazz JAZID 48
- The People Tree (1 September 1993) Acid Jazz JAZID 83
- You Have Been Watching (13 October 1995) Acid Jazz
- The Desired Effect (live, 1995)
- Time of the Future (compilation, 2001)
- The Further Adventures of Mother Earth (compilation and previously unreleased, 26 July 2004) Acid Jazz JAZID 60

=== Singles and EPs ===
- "Hope You're Feeling Better" JAZID 55 (Santana cover)
- "Mr. Freedom" (EP) JAZID 62
- "Grow Your Own EP" (EP) JAZID 75
- "Find It" JAZID 94
- "Jesse" JAZID 100
- "Institution Man" JAZID 108
- "Freethinker" (EP) JAZID 116
