= Dollars (film) =

1971 film by Richard Brooks

$
- Original film poster
- Directed by: Richard Brooks
- Written by: Richard Brooks
- Produced by: M. J. Frankovich
- Starring: Warren Beatty; Goldie Hawn; Gert Fröbe; Robert Webber; Scott Brady
- Cinematography: Petrus Schloemp
- Edited by: George Grenville
- Music by: Quincy Jones
- Production company: Frankovich Productions, Inc.
- Distributed by: Columbia Pictures
- Release dates: December 17, 1971 (NYC); December 22, 1971 (LA)
- Running time: 119–120 minutes
- Country: United States
- Language: English

$, also known as Dollar$, Dollars or $ (Dollars), and in the UK as The Heist, is a 1971 American heist comedy film starring Warren Beatty and Goldie Hawn, written and directed by Richard Brooks and produced by M.J. Frankovich. The supporting cast includes Gert Fröbe, Robert Webber and Scott Brady. The film is about bank security consultant Joe Collins (Beatty) who develops a scheme with prostitute Dawn Divine (Hawn), to steal several criminals' money from a bank vault.

The film was partly shot in Hamburg, West Germany, which forms the primary location of the film and was supported by the Hamburg Art Museum and Bendestorf Studios. The film's music is composed and produced by Quincy Jones, and the soundtrack features performances by the Don Elliott Voices, Little Richard, Roberta Flack and Doug Kershaw. The title $ appears in the opening credits only in the form of a giant character, as would be used in a sign, being transported by a crane. $ was distributed by Columbia Pictures.

== Plot ==
Taking advantage of West German bank privacy laws, several criminals use safe deposit boxes in a Hamburg bank to store large amounts of illicit cash. These include Las Vegas mobster and attorney Mr. North, a ruthless drug smuggler known as the Candy Man, and a crooked overbearing U.S. Army officer, the Sarge and his meek-mannered partner the Major, who conspire on a big heroin and LSD smuggling score. Joe Collins, an American bank security consultant, has been spying on them and makes mysterious and elaborate preparations to steal their money (totaling more than $1.5 million) with the help of Dawn Divine, a hooker with a heart of gold, since Mr. North and the Sarge are her clients.

The Candy Man discovers Helga, a stripper that Collins employed to follow and spy on him and strangles her in a strip club. Granich, the club owner, is the boss of a drug smuggling mob who asks the Candy Man to deliver two bottles of a concentrated solution of LSD to Copenhagen. When the Candy Man asks about his fees, Granich gives him a third bottle as his share. Collins sends Divine to accompany the Candy Man in his trip as replacement to Helga. The Candy Man empty the two bottles into two champagne bottles as a disguise to smuggle the drug through customs. The Sarge makes a deal with the Candy Man --- Sarge would pay him next day $40,000 in exchange for hollow baseballs filled with heroin. At the airport, the Candy Man buys two real champagne bottles and replaces them with the identical-looking LSD bottles in the restroom and gives them to Divine. When Collins reads about Helga's death in the papers, he tries to warn Divine but he can't reach her, so he tips off the customs of Copenhagen Airport about her. They take her to a room to search her, while the Candy Man uses their distraction by Divine to leave with the drug-filled bottles.

Collins has Divine phone in a bomb threat to the bank president, Mr. Kessel, to create a diversion. Collins then locks himself inside the bank vault with a gold bar normally displayed in the lobby to supposedly save it. The bank is closed and evacuated while Collins uses duplicate keys (it is implied that Collins had obtained the necessary bank information and secretly copied the criminals' keys while they were engaged in sexual trysts with Divine) to empty the criminals' three safe deposit boxes into Dawn's large-size deposit box, using a special stopwatch he ordered to exactly avoid the rapidly-panning CCTV cameras that he supervised their installation before. Despite the fact that Kessel insists on burning through the wall to rescue Joe instead of waiting for the time lock to open, Joe succeeds in the heist and is hailed as a hero for "preventing" the robbery of the gold bar.

The next day, the three criminals, one by one, discover that their boxes are empty, and thus they cannot complete their illegal schemes, nor do they dare to go to the police to report the thefts, since they would then risk revealing their own dishonest pasts. Mr. North flees the country. The mob doesn't believe the Candy Man that their money ($140,000, the price for the two LSD bottles) was stolen and torture him, but he manages to escape, only to find his lodgings in flames, presumably torched by the vengeful mobsters, as well. He goes to the Sarge to find him also attacking the Major since he thinks that he took the deposit box contents (money) for himself. The Candy Man sees the photo of Divine with the Sarge and deduces the plan of Collins and Divine. The three men join forces and search Divine's apartment, as she was their common link, and find clues that connect her to Collins and Mr. North thus confirming the Candy Man's theory. Collins and Divine divide the heist money in two suitcases. Later, Divine, eager to drink, puts a Champagne bottle that she found in the Candy Man's deposit box in Collins' suitcase with wads of newspaper. The Sarge calls Kessel to get Collins' home address, but Collins is quickly tipped off by Kessel and he hurriedly sends Divine to the train station with a suitcase packed with her take — $765,000 — promising to meet her later someplace out of the country.

A long chase begins as Divine gives the Major the slip at the train station while the Candy Man and the Sarge chase Collins across a rail yard and through the Elbe Tunnel. Collins escapes on a car carrier truck, lugging his suitcase, but the Candy Man and the Sarge follow and catch up in the morning at a frozen lake in the countryside, where the Candy Man crashes his car through the ice and drowns.

Collins escapes again by hopping a train, but during the night the Sarge catches up to him, only to find that Collins' suitcase contains nothing but the bottle of champagne and the wads of newspaper. They conclude that Divine double-crossed Collins by repacking the suitcases (and thus taking all the money for herself) while he was getting the car, and the Sarge proposes a plan to Collins that they go after Divine together and split the money. However, upon swallowing a mouthful of the "champagne", the Sarge instantly goes into violent convulsions and falls down dead. It is obvious that the Candy Man had filled this bottle too with his share of the solution as he did with the two bottles that he delivered to Copenhagen. It's clear from Collins' reaction that he had no idea of the bottle's contents, and was just about to imbibe himself. Joe elects to place his glass of “champagne” down and departs the train.

Divine is staying at the Hotel del Coronado, joyfully driving a gleaming new yellow Corvette, and cuddling in bed with an unseen someone. The other suitcase is sitting near the bed, and Collins' bomber jacket hangs on the coat rack. Divine calmly explains to Collins that she was certain that the criminals wouldn't kill him as they would be left with no way to get the money; Divine had planned all along to still share the money with Collins as they'd originally arranged, and so she had merely taken the money in order to keep it from anyone who'd pursued Collins, and keep him safe at the same time.

== Cast ==
- Warren Beatty as Joe Collins
- Goldie Hawn as Dawn Divine
- Gert Fröbe as Mr. Kessel
- Robert Webber as Mr. North
- Scott Brady as Sarge
- Arthur Brauss as Candy Man
- Robert Stiles as Major
- Wolfgang Kieling as Granich
- Robert Herron as Bodyguard
- Christiane Maybach as Helga
- Hans Hutter as Karl
- Monica Stender as Berta
- Horst Hesslein as Bruno
- Wolfgang Kuhlman as Furcoat
- Klaus Schichan as Knifeman

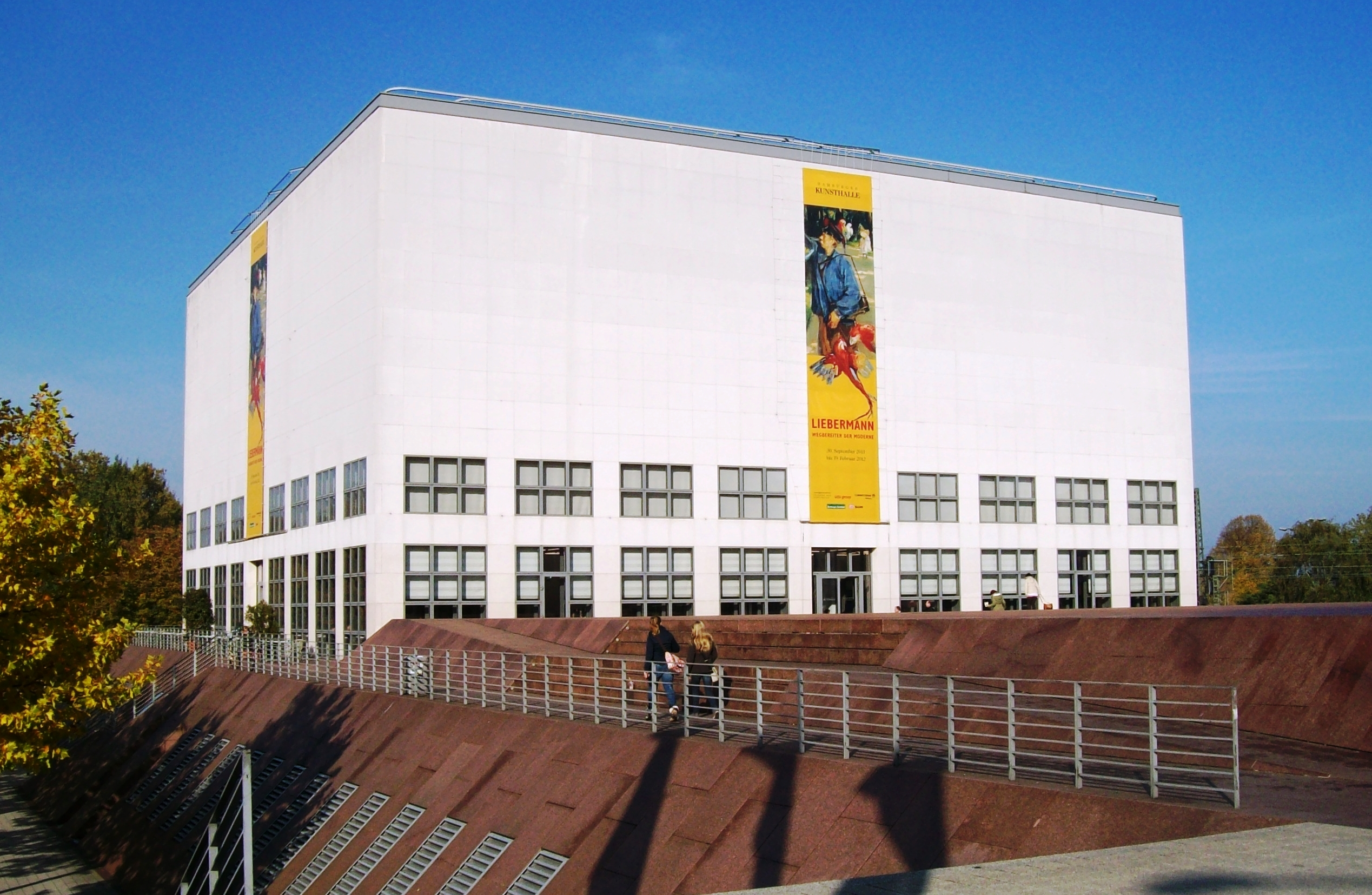
The Kunsthalle in Hamburg. The part used in $ as the bank is actually on the other side of this building, Galerie der Gegenwart, which houses the modern collection.

== Production ==
Principal photography for $ took place at Bendestorf Studio is Hamburg, West Germany from early January to early May 1971, and location shooting took place in that city as well. The building depicted as the exterior of the bank was actually the Kunsthalle, Hamburg's principal museum of art. The route followed in the chase scenes realistically takes the viewer through many of the city's locales. Other locations in Hamburg include the Reeperbahn — the city's red-light district — and the Salambo Cabaret nightclub.

Other filming locations included Munich, Norway, the Pacific Coast Highway and the Hotel del Coronado near San Diego, California.

Warren Beatty was injured while filming the train sequence, which caused him to miss at least two days of shooting.

== Soundtrack ==
The soundtrack to the film was composed and produced by Quincy Jones, with performances by Little Richard, Roberta Flack and Doug Kershaw, in addition to featuring the Don Elliot Voices throughout the score. Among Jones' bouncy, funky instrumental songs, his track "Snow Creatures" has been heavily sampled by numerous hip-hop artists, including Gang Starr and Common. Additionally, "Kitty with the Bent Frame" was sampled in "Shook Ones, Part II" by Mobb Deep from their 1995 album The Infamous.

Little Richard sings "Money Is" and "Do It to It", both with music and lyrics by Quincy Jones, while Roberta Flack sings "When You're Smiling (The Whole World Smiles with You)", with music and lyrics by Mark Fisher, Joe Goodwin and Larry Shay.

== Release and reception ==
The premiere of the film took place in New York City on December 15, 1971, and it was released in theaters across the United States on December 17, 1971. The Los Angeles premiere was on December 22.

Roger Ebert gave the film three stars out of four and praised it as a "slick and breakneck caper movie that runs like a well-oiled thrill." He praised the performance of Beatty, describing him as "the best con man in movies, certainly since Clark Gable died. He is filled with deals, angles, things he has to pull you over in a corner to whisper. He can make you rich tomorrow, and himself, too, one of these days. And he has an unusual kind narcissism — unusual for an actor. He isn't narcissistic about himself, but about his style; he's in love with conning people." Roger Greenspun of The New York Times wrote that the film boasts "an attractive cast, some clever dialogue (also by Brooks), and lots of suspense — at least, until the chase begins and never seems to end, and you wish that everyone would go home and get some rest ... $ is actually a decent short film that has been made long by the most predictable and least ingenious of means." Arthur D. Murphy of Variety found the film "[f]ar too leisurely in plot and pacing," suggesting that "Brooks maybe is too serious a filmmaker for this sort of thing. He wants his characters to have depth and motivation, but the principle does not work well herein." Charles Champlin of the Los Angeles Times called it a "crackling good crime-chase-suspense story. Its considerable pleasure is that it sets us up solidly in a colorful, unfamiliar but unquestionably real place — Hamburg, Germany — and plays its ingenious charades absolutely as if they were part of the teeming life of that city." Gene Siskel of the Chicago Tribune gave the film two-and-a-half stars out of four and wrote that it has a "clever premise" and that Beatty and Goldie Hawn were "pleasant performers," but "Brooks' script continually interrupts its mood of a slick caper film with slapstick humor. $ tries to be both a comedy and a caper, and manages to be neither."

A Channel 4 review of the film in the UK gave it a 4 out of 5 rating, and, like Ebert, noted the pace of the directing and script by Brooks, describing it as "cutting more rapidly than usual, he kept the action moving fairly entertainingly for most of the movie, with includes a long and spectacular car chase". However, unlike Ebert, critic Christopher Null believed the film's script weakened at midpoint: "Beatty and Hawn carry this fun little heist/comedy picture for the first hour, but then the whole affair gets a little tiring". He did, however, rate the film 3.5 out of 5.

== Home video ==
The film was released on DVD in 2008, concurrently with the CD re-release of the film's soundtrack, which had previously been released on CD in 2001 by Warner Bros. Records, Inc.

== See also ==
- List of American films of 1971
