= If It Ain't Love (album) =

Studio album by Patrice Jégou
- Released: March 22, 2019
- Genre: Jazz
- Length: 65:59
- Label: Prairie Star Records
- Producer: Jorge Calandrelli; Mark Kibble; Mike Lang; Yinka Oyelese; David Paich

Patrice Jégou chronology
Speak Low (2014)	If It Ain't Love (2019)

Professional ratings
Review scores
Source	Rating
All About Jazz	4.5/5 stars
Music Connection	8/10
Girl Singers	Highest Recommendation

If It Ain't Love is the second solo album by Patrice Jégou, released March 22, 2019. The opening track, "Lover Come Back to Me" won an Independent Music Award in NYC for Best A cappella Song. The song features Mark Kibble and Alvin Chea from Take 6.

== Critical reception ==
Nicholas F. Mondello of All About Jazz gives this album 4½ out of 5 stars and begins his review with, "Listening to Canadian vocal artist Patrice Jégou's second album, If It Ain't Love, one would never think that she once was a world-class professional figure skater. One would also immediately discern that she and her similarly world-class musical partners have delivered a perfect-10 performance."

Jazz Time's Andrew Gilbert concludes his review with, "With so much to like about Jégou, If It Ain’t Love presents its own query. She’s spread her wings on her first two albums. Is she ready for a deeper dive?"

Jonathan Widran of Music Connection writes. "Former pro figure skater and classical opera singer Patrice Jegou finds liberation and fresh creativity interpreting jazz standards, strolling, darting, weaving and soaring through a wild expanse of styles and moods on this collection."

Doug Boynton of Girl Singers says this in his review, "This set of sixteen provides not only monetary but also acoustic value. The assembled crew of powerful talent is there to put a frame around the showcase for Ms. Jégou’s remarkable voice. Highest recommendation for this set."

Jazz Journal's review concludes with, "If It Ain’t Love is a stunning platform for Jégou’s vocal gifts."

The JW Vibe review by Jonathan Widran concludes with, "Yet for all that firepower behind her, and all the beautiful legendary vocal spirits surrounding her in those sacred spaces, this project is all about Patrice, an artist of tremendous talents and endless vision who stands center stage, engaging our attention song after song. If that ain’t love, I don’t know what is."

Lemon Wire's Dodie Miller-Gould writes, "Vocalist Patrice Jegou has a sound that is steeped in classic jazz. Warm and fluid, Jegou’s sings with heartfelt passion and confidence. Listeners will find themselves waiting to hear where Jegou takes them next. Her recording, If It Ain’t Love is a treasure trove of classically styled jazz."

== Track listing ==
No.	Title	Writer(s)	Length
1.	"Lover Come Back to Me" (a capella with Mark Kibble and Alvin Chea)	Oscar Hammerstein II; Sigmund Romberg	3:19
2.	"Jersey Bounce" (with The Clayton-Hamilton Jazz Orchestra)	Tiny Bradshaw; Buddy Feyne; Eddie Johnson; Bobby Plater	2:38
3.	"Baubles, Bangles and Beads"	George Forrest; Robert Wright	4:42
4.	"Yes We Can, Can" (with Táta Vega)	Allen Toussaint	5:04
5.	"I'm So Glad I'm Standing Here Today"	Will Jennings; Joe Sample	5:32
6.	"Wrap Your Troubles In Dreams" (with Take 6)	Harry Barris; Ted Koehler; Billy Moll	4:02
7.	"If It Ain't Love" (with The Clayton-Hamilton Jazz Orchestra)	Andy Razaf; Donald Redman; Thomas Fats Waller	3:12
8.	"Estate (Summer)" (with Larry Koonse)	Bruno Brighetti; Bruno Martino	4:38
9.	"Lover Come Back To Me" (with Mark Kibble)	Oscar Hammerstein II; Sigmund Romberg	3:20
10.	"Waltz For Debby"	Bill Evans; Gene Lees	3:37
11.	"Losing You"	Randy Newman	4:40
12.	"Just Squeeze Me" (with The Clayton-Hamilton Jazz Orchestra)	Duke Ellington; Lee Gaines	3:01
13.	"Where Do You Start?"	Alan Bergman; Marilyn Bergman; Johnny Mandel	3:52
14.	"Remembrances" (with Javier Almaráz)	Peter Getz; Brian Hobbs; Mike Lang	4:57
15.	"Please Send Me Someone to Love" (with The Clayton-Hamilton Jazz Orchestra)	Percy Mayfield	4:22
16.	"It Might Be You"	Alan Bergman; Marilyn Bergman; Dave Grusin	5:03
Total length:			65:59

Track information adapted from the album's liner notes.

== Musicians ==
- Patrice Jegou: vocals
- Mark Kibble: vocals (1, 8, 9), percussion (9)
- Alvin Chea: vocals (1)
- Take 6: vocals (6)
- The Clayton-Hamilton Orchestra (2, 7, 12, 15)
- Gilbert Castellanos: trumpet (2)
- Mike Lang: piano (3, 5, 8, 10, 11, 12, 13, 14, 16) Rhodes (4,14)
- Ramón Stagnaro: guitar (3, 13,), acoustic guitar (14)
- Kevin Axt: bass (3, 5, 8, 13)
- Ray Brinker: drums (3, 13)
- Luis Conte (3, 13): Percussion (3)
- David Lang: Wurlitzer (4)
- David Paich: Hammond B-3, piano (4)
- Dean Parks: guitar (4)
- Abraham Laboirel Sr.: bass (4, 14)
- Steve Ferrone: drums (4, 14)
- Lenny Castro: percussion (4, 14)
- Tom Scott: tenor saxophone (3)
- Choir (4, 5): Bill Cantos (4), Kurt Lykes, Jamie McCrary, Jason Morales, Melodye Perry, Alfie Silas. Tiffany Smith, Tata Vega
- Larry Koonse: acoustic guitar (5, 8), guitar (14)
- Michael Thompson: electric guitar (5, 8)
- John "J.R." Robinson: drums (5, 8)
- Yaron Gershovsky: piano (9)
- Boris Kozlov: bass (9)
- Cliff Almond: drums (9)
- Steve Patrick, Mike Barry: trumpets (9)
- Doug Moffet: tenor and baritone saxophone (9)
- Sam Levine: alto saxophone (9)
- Roy Agee: trombone (9)
- Greg Phillinganes: keyboards(16)

Credits procured from All About Jazz and verified from liner notes.

== Orchestras ==
The Clayton-Hamilton Jazz Orchestra: John Clayton, arranger. Jeff Hamilton, drums. Jeff Clayton, saxophone. Christoph Luty, bass. Tamir Hendelman, piano. Graham Dechter, guitar. Saxophones: Lee Callet, Keith Fiddmont, Charles Owens, Ricky Woodard. Trombones: Steve Baxter, George Bohanon, Ira Nepus, Maurice Spears. Trumpets: Gilbert Castellanos, Sal Cracchiolo, James Ford, Clay Jenkins, Bijon Watson. Mike Lang, guest pianist (“Just Squeeze Me”). Management: Gail Boyd Artist Management.

Orchestra: arranged and conducted by Jorge Calandrelli (tracks 3, 5, 8, 10, 13). Violins: Bruce Dukov (concertmaster), Charles Bisharat, Darius Campo, Roberto Cani, Ron Clark, Kevin Connolly, Joel Derouin, Nina Evtuhov, Neel Hammond, Natalie Leggett, Robin Olson, Joel Parcman, Sara Parkins, Katia Popov, Neil Samples, Ina Veli. Violas: Brian Dembrow (principal), Robert Brophy, Andrew Duckles, Alma Fernandez, Harry Shirinian, David Walther. Celli: Armen Ksajikian (principal), Alisha Bauer, Tina Soule, John Walz. Flute: Steve Kujala. Oboe: Joe Stone. Clarinet: Greg Huckins. French Horns: Jim Atkinson (principal), Sarah Bach, Allan Fogle, Dylan Hart. Harp: Gayle Levant. Greg Bartheld, production assistant to Mr. Calandrelli. Sonya Belousova, assistant to Mr. Calandrelli.

Orchestra: arranged and conducted by Nan Schwartz (tracks 11 & 14). Violins: Bruce Dukov (concertmaster), Maiani da Silva, Mario Deleon, Lisa Dondlinger, Neel Hammond, Elizabeth Hedman, Johana Krejci, Marissa Kuney, Lorand Lokuszta, Cindy Moussas, Reiko Nakano, Radu Pieptea, Mark Robertson, Julie Rogers, Neil Samples, Jenny Takamatsu, Irina Voloshina, Adriana Zoppo. Violas: Dimtri Bovaird, Caroline Buckman, Matt Funes, Jody Rubin, Harry Shirinian, Rodney Wirtz. Celli: Matt Cook, Ira Glansbeek, Laszlo Mezo, Steve Vele. Basses: Tim Eckert, Don Ferrone, Dave Young. Flutes: Heather Clark, Gerry Rotella. Clarinet: Dan Higgins. Trombones: Bill Booth, Charlie Morillas. Bass Trombone: Craig Gosnell. French Horn: Steve Becknell.

== Production ==
- Produced by: Jorge Calandrelli, Mark Kibble, Mike Lang, Yinka Oyelese, and David Paich
- Executive Producer: Yinka Oyelese
- Assistant Engineers: Steve Genewick, Chandler Harrod, Christina Paakkari, Jeff Fitzpatrick (Capitol Studios); Scott Moore, Rouble Kapoor (United Recording); Tyler Shields, Chad Gordon (EastWest Studios); Michael Walter (Sony Tree Studios); Tyler Hartman, Nate Thor Odden (Avatar Studios).
- Recorded at ATS Studios, Calabasas, CA; Avatar Studios, New York City; EastWest Studios, Hollywood, CA; Capitol Studios, Hollywood, CA; Shorefire Studio, Long Branch, NJ; Sony Tree Studios, Nashville, TN; United Recording, Hollywood, CA; Vertical Studio, Nashville, TN.
- Mixed by Don Murray at United Recording, Hollywood, CA; Al Schmitt at Capitol Studios, Hollywood, CA; Marcelo Pennell at BigSky, Franklin, TN.
- Mastered by Eric Boulanger and Jett Galindo at the Bakery, Culver City, CA.
- Contractor: Joe Soldo.
- Music preparation: Lloyd Barry, John & Julie Eidsvoog, Liz Finch, Yaron Gershovsky, Chie Imaizumi, Brett McDonald, Josef Zimmermann.
- Italian diction coaches: Professor Corradina Caporello, Professor Eduardo Chama.
- Album design: Jacob Blaze
- Patrice Jégou logo: Moshik Nadav
- Album photography: Chris Knight
- Hair and make-up: Johnny Gonzalez

Orchestra and production credits taken from Patrice Jégou's official site.
