= A Hyperactive Workout for the Flying Squad =

Studio album by Ocean Colour Scene
- Released: 21 March 2005
- Studios: Piersie Lodge, Battery
- Genre: Alternative rock
- Length: 47:13
- Label: Sanctuary
- Producer: Dave Eringa

Ocean Colour Scene chronology
North Atlantic Drift (2003)	A Hyperactive Workout for the Flying Squad (2005)	On the Leyline (2007)

Singles from A Hyperactive Workout for the Flying Squad
- 1. "Free My Name" Released: 7 March 2005; 2. "This Day Should Last Forever" Released: 20 June 2005

A Hyperactive Workout for the Flying Squad is the seventh studio album by English rock band Ocean Colour Scene. It was originally due to be released in September 2004 but Sanctuary Records requested the band record a live album instead and it was eventually released on 21 March 2005. The album was produced by Dave Eringa and recorded at a hunting lodge near Kirriemuir, Scotland. The album's unusual title was a phrase the band heard on BBC Radio 4 and decided they liked. Critical reception to the album generally agreed that the album would please Ocean Colour Scene fans, although the album charted lower than previous albums at number 30 in the UK album chart compared to number 14 for the previous album North Atlantic Drift.

== Background and production ==
Bassist Damon Minchella left the band in 2003. A Hyperactive Workout for the Flying Squad was recorded with producer Dave Eringa; the majority of sessions were held at Piersie Lodge in Kirriemuir, Scotland, while "Wah Wah" and "Start of the Day" were done at Battery Studios in London. Guy Massey acted as the main engineer, while Matt Hyde engineered "Wah-Wah". All recordings were mixed at Miloco Studios, also in London; Eringa mixed "Everything Comes at the Right Time", "Wah Wah", "Move Things Over", "Have You Got the Right", "Start of the Day", and "My Time", while Massey mixed the remainder. Howie Weinberg mastered the album at Masterdisk in New York City.

== Composition ==
Cradock played bass on eight of the album's tracks, Harrison played it on three; no bass is featured on "My Time". Eringa arranged and programmed songs on the album; Sally Herbert arranged the strings on "Free My Name" and "Another Time to Stay". The opening track "Everything Comes at the Right Time" incorporates Led Zeppelin-indebted guitar riffs. "Free My Name" features a Motown-styled string section, and is followed by a cover version of "Wah Wah" (1970) by George Harrison. "Drive Away" recalled "One" (1992) by U2 with its Edge-influenced guitarwork. The slow-paced, cello-driven "I Love You" is a tribute to Roy Orbison and the Velvet Underground, and is followed by the violin-focused "This Day Should Last Forever", which include an accordion, fiddle and a mandolin.

The jazz rock song "Move Things Over" was reminiscent of the work of the Temptations. "Waving Not Drowning" features Paul Weller on guitar, and Jools Holland on piano and Hammond organ. "God's World" incorporates the use of a bass synthesizer. With "Another Time to Stay", Fowler ape the vocal style of former Journey singer Steve Perry; "Have You Got the Right" sees Fowler emulate Bonnie "Prince" Billy. The album ends with two more cover version: "Start of the Day" by the Real People and "My Time" by Bob Andy, the latter of which is an offbeat reggae song with drummer Oscar Harrison on lead vocals.

== Release ==
Guitarist Andy Bennett joined the band in April 2004; by the following month, bassist Dan Sealey joined. "Free My Name" was released as the album's lead single on 7 March 2005. The 7" vinyl version included "Better Than Before" as the B-side, while the CD version featured "Make It Better", an acoustic live version of "Another Time to Stay", and the music video for "Free My Name". A Hyperactive Workout for the Flying Squad was released on 21 March 2005, through Sanctuary Records.

"This Day Should Last Forever" was released as a single on 20 June 2005. The 7" vinyl version included an instrumental version of "Move Things Over" as the B-side, while the CD version featured a b-side titled Last December.

== Reception ==
Professional ratings
Aggregate scores
Source	Rating
Metacritic	58/100
Review scores
Source	Rating
AllMusic	3/5 stars
BBC Music	Favorable
Gigwise	1/5 stars
Hot Press	Favourable
The List	2/5 marks
MusicOMH	Mixed
Pitchfork	5.5/10
PopMatters	4/10 stars

A Hyperactive Workout for the Flying Squad was met with mixed or average reviews from music critics. At Metacritic, which assigns a normalized rating out of 100 to reviews from mainstream publications, the album received an average score of 58, based on 7 reviews.

AllMusic reviewer Stephen Thomas Erlewine called the album a "tasteful, well-crafted, earnest collection of classicist rock." He said that while it "offer[ed] few surprises", the band "also offer no embarrassments". BBC Music contributor Dan Tallis wrote that the album was not as "instantly commercially accessible" as the band's most popular release, Moseley Shoals (1996), it was "certainly a return to form." Phil Udell of Hot Press saw the album as the band's "most measured release to date", it was "all pretty brave – the faithful may scratch their heads and the detractors probably won't even listen" to the album. Pitchfork writer Adam Moerder said there was nothing "'hyperactive' about them creatively", with Fowler "attacks every song like a karaoke fiend-- a telling likeness considering three songs here are covers and several more could be misconstrued as such."

musicOMH contributor Sam Shepherd wrote that one cover could be viewed as "too many most of the time, but to include three is pushing the limit a little too much." He added that there was "nothing here to really surprise anyone, OCS are steadily ploughing the same old furrow." Raphael Costambeys-Kempczynski of PopMatters wrote that the tracks on the album "sound like they were written for the pub circuit", which he theorised was "the reason why they’ve never managed to really take the scene by storm." Aside from two highlights ("Everything Comes at the Right Time" and "God's World"), he said that the remainder of the album "needs to decide if imitation is the sincerest form of flattery." The List writer Allan Radcliffe said that aside from "My Time", the album was "pretty much what you'd expect from [the band]: plaintive, anthemic choruses and oodles of insipid lyrics". Gigwise's Chris Saunders wrote that the band "sound exactly like they did when they were last here", with an album that "just doesn't say anything new, push any boundaries or even get close to stealing some of the limelight away" from newer acts.

== Track listing ==
All songs by Simon Fowler, Steve Cradock and Oscar Harrison, except where noted.

1. "Everything Comes at the Right Time" – 3:49
2. "Free My Name" – 2:42
3. "Wah Wah" (George Harrison) – 3:32
4. "Drive Away" – 4:41
5. "I Love You" – 3:30
6. "This Day Should Last Forever" – 3:05
7. "Move Things Over" – 5:10
8. "Waving Not Drowning" – 3:20
9. "God's World" – 3:21
10. "Another Time to Stay" – 4:57
11. "Have You Got the Right" – 2:02
12. "Start of the Day" (Anthony Griffiths, Chris Griffiths) – 3:46
13. "My Time" (Keith Anderson) – 3:18

== Personnel ==
Personnel per booklet and sleeve.

Ocean Colour Scene

- Steve Cradock – guitars, bass (tracks 1–6, 8 and 9), percussion (tracks 2 and 5), piano (tracks 2 and 4), backing vocals (tracks 2 and 6), xylophone (tracks 2 and 10), tambura (tracks 4 and 5), mandolin (track 6), Harmonium (track 6)
- Simon Fowler – lead vocals (all except track 13), backing vocals (all except tracks 11–13), acoustic guitar (tracks 4, 5, 7, 10 and 11), harmonica (track 8)
- Oscar Harrison – drums (all except track 11), percussion (all except tracks 11 and 12), backing vocals (tracks 2, 6, 10 and 13), bass (tracks 7, 10 and 13), lead vocals (track 13), piano (track 13)

Additional musicians

- Dave Eringa – arranger, programmer, synthesizer (tracks 2, 5, 7 and 9), keyboards (tracks 4, 7, 9 and 10)
- Sally Herbert – string arranger, violin (tracks 2 and 10)
- Gini Ball – violin (tracks 2 and 10)
- Julia Singleton – violin (tracks 2 and 10)
- Anne Stephenson – violin (tracks 2 and 10)
- Claire Orsler – viola (tracks 2 and 10)
- Ian Burdge – cello (tracks 2 and 10)
- Jacko Peake – baritone saxophone (tracks 2 and 3), alto saxophone (tracks 2 and 3)
- Dominic Glover – trumpet (tracks 2 and 3)
- John McCusker – viola (tracks 5 and 11), violin (tracks 6 and 11)
- Jools Holland – piano (track 8), Hammond organ (track 8)
- Paul Weller – guitar (track 8)
- Carleen Anderson – backing vocals (track 9)

Production and design

- Dave Eringa – producer, mixing (tracks 1, 3, 7 and 11–13)
- Guy Massey – engineer (all except track 3), mixing (tracks 2, 4–6 and 8–10)
- Matt Hyde – engineer (track 3)
- Howie Weinberg – mastering
- Misha Ivanovic – sleeve design, art direction
