= Patrice Jégou =

Canadian singer

- Born: St. John’s, Newfoundland, Canada
- Genres: Jazz
- Occupation: Musician
- Labels: Prairie Star Records
- Website: patricejegou.com

Patrice Jégou is a New Jersey–based Canadian jazz singer.

== Early life ==
She was born in St. John's, Newfoundland and Labrador, and raised in Red Deer, Alberta. She came from a family of hobbyist musicians.

== Career and education ==
She began ice skating at age seven and started her professional career at age 18, first as a coach in New Zealand and later as a performer in Mexico. She switched her focus to singing following a suggestion by a fellow ice skater who remarked that she should take singing lessons when she got back to Canada. She took her friend's suggestion to heart and eventually earned a Doctorate in Classical Vocal Performance from Rutgers University. She also earned a Bachelor of Music degree from the University of Calgary, and a Master of Music degree from Belmont University in Nashville, both in Classical Vocal Performance.

Patrice has recorded two solo jazz albums, Speak Low (2014) and If It Ain’t Love (2019). She is the founder of independent record label Prairie Star Records LLC.

Belmont University alumni, Jégou received top honors in the A Cappella Song category at the 17th annual Independent Music Awards (IMAs) for the song "Lover Come Back To Me", the lead song from her second album, If It Ain’t Love, featuring Mark Kibble and Alvin Chea of Take 6.

== Personal life ==
Jégou is married and lives in New Jersey with her husband, Yinka Oyelese.

== Discography ==
- Speak Low (Prairie Star, 2014)
- If It Ain't Love (Prairie Star, 2019)
