= Andy Bennett (musician) =

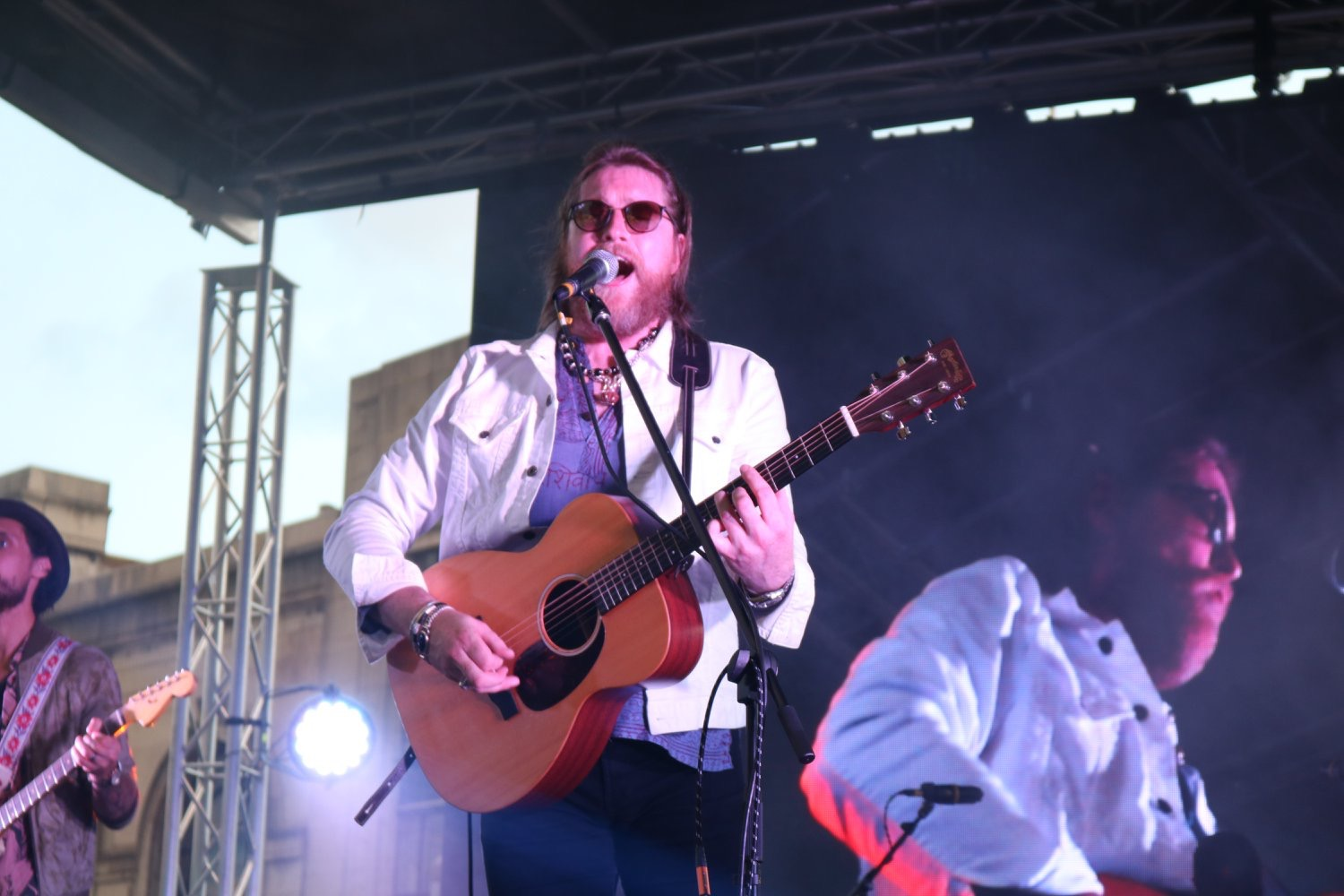
- Bennett performing at Queens Square, Wolverhampton in 2018

Background information
- Born: Leamington Spa, Warwickshire, United Kingdom
- Genres: British rock, pop
- Occupation: Musician
- Instruments: Vocals, guitar
- Labels: Acid Jazz Records, Swan Music
- Website: AndyBennettMusic.com

Andy Bennett (born in Leamington Spa, Warwickshire), is an English singer and musician, best known for his work with Ocean Colour Scene.

== The Elements ==
Bennett had his first break with his band The Elements (formerly known as Sargent) which included Tim Jacques, Lee Burn and Dave Casswell. The Elements regularly gigged throughout Birmingham and supported Ocean Colour Scene. The band released their first album, The Elements, on Acid Jazz Records music label and the album charted at #7 in the indie music charts.

== Ocean Colour Scene ==
Bennett joined Ocean Colour Scene on 8 April 2004 (when he participated in the Royal Albert Hall concert). He has featured on the following albums:

- One for the Road (2004) (Guitar, Background Vocals)
- A Hyperactive Workout for the Flying Squad (2005) (Guitar)
- Live Acoustic at the Jam House (2006) (Acoustic and Electric Guitar, Background Vocals)
- Live at Birmingham Academy (2006)
- On the Leyline (2007) (Acoustic and Electric Guitar)
- Live at the Town Hall (2008)
- Saturday (2010) (Composer)
- 21 (2010) (Guitar, Composer)

Bennett co-wrote the song "Old Pair of Jeans" which was on the Saturday album. According to The Digital Fix, "It just gets better with every song a winner. The jaunty ‘Old Pair Of Jeans’ is rollicking fun: "I wish you didn't get hung up so easily / When you're bound fall apart you always fall apart at the seams / So worn and so torn..like an old pair of jeans." The song also featured on the 21 album.

Bennett has toured with Ocean Colour Scene since 2004, but left in February 2015 to focus on his solo material.

== Solo career ==
In October 2015, Andy Bennett released his solo debut single "Hole in the Road", followed in May 2016 by the single "Drift Away".

In November 2016, Bennett released his first album, thinkin', drinkin', singin' , featuring a back catalogue of songs which he has been working on over time (including the songs previously released as singles and also a new version of the song "Old Pair of Jeans"). His album was met with positive response, garnering a four stars out of five review from PlanetMosh, as well as a 5 stars rating from Flick of the Finger. The publication cited the track "Fool No More" as "the quintessential track on an album that is full of gems."
