= The People Tree =

Studio album by Mother Earth
- Released: 1993
- Studio: Acid Jazz Studios, Strongroom, Mayfair and Real World
- Genre: Acid jazz
- Length: 66:12
- Label: Acid Jazz Records
- Producer: Eddie Piller

Mother Earth chronology
Stoned Women (1992)	The People Tree (1993)	You Have Been Watching (1995)

Professional ratings
Review scores
Source	Rating
Allmusic	4/5 stars

The People Tree is an album by British acid jazz group Mother Earth that was released on the Acid Jazz Records label in 1993. The album was reissued on vinyl by Acid Jazz Records in 2019. The single "Jesse" has been included on a number of acid jazz compilation albums.

== Reception ==
Allmusic awarded the album with 4 out of 5 stars. In his review of the 2019 vinyl reissue for Louder Than War, Matt Mead calls the album "a record of substance, one that would last the years and decades to come".

== Track listing ==
1. "Institution Man" (Neil Corcoran, Matt Deighton) – 5:26
2. "Jesse" (Deighton, Shauna Greene) – 5:02
3. "Stardust Bubblegum" (Corcoran, Deighton) – 3:59
4. "Mister Freedom" (Bryn Barklam, Corcoran, Deighton) – 4:44
5. "Warlocks of the Mind Part I" (Mother Earth) – 3:05
6. "Dragster" (Deighton) – 2:40
7. "Find It" (Barklam) – 5:13
8. "The People Tree" (Deighton) – 3:40
9. "Apple Green" (Deighton, Greene) – 4:24
10. "Time of the Future" (Corcoran, Deighton) – 6:17
11. "Saturation 70" (Barklam, Corcoran, Deighton, Chris White) – 4:24
12. "Illusions" (Corcoran) – 3:02
13. "Warlocks of the Mind Part II" (Mother Earth) – 3:13
14. "A Trip Down Brian Lane" (Barklam, Corcoran, Deighton, White, Eddie Piller) – 11:11

== Personnel ==
- Matt Deighton – lead vocals, acoustic and electric guitars
- Bryn Barklam – Hammond organ, Fender Rhodes, piano
- Neil Corcoran – bass
- Chris White – drums
- Meryl Kenton Forbes – backing vocals, lead vocals on tracks 2, 3 and 14
- James Taylor – Fender Rhodes
- Simon Bartholomew – guitars, percussion, mandolin, Moog
- Chris Lawrence – lap steel guitar
- Gerard Presencer – trumpet
- Dennis Rollins – trombone
- Michael Smith – saxophone
- Pablo, Snowboy – percussion
- Paul Weller, Shauna Greene, DC Lee, Sherrine, Destry, Obe – backing vocals
- Gered Mankowitz - photography
