= Are You Trying to Be Lonely? =

Song by Andy Lewis & Paul Weller
- Written: Andy Lewis / Paul Weller
- Released: 2007
- Label: Acid Jazz AJX193CD

Are You Trying to Be Lonely was a single for Andy Lewis and Paul Weller. It was released on the Acid Jazz Records label in 2007. It became a hit for them that year.

== Background ==
The single was released on Acid Jazz AJX193CD on compact disc. It was backed with "Tell me Once Again You Love Me", "The Lazuli Affair" and an instrumental version of "Are You Trying To Be Lonely?".

The promotional 45 rpm version of the single contained the tracks, "Are You Trying to Be Lonely" BW "Tell Me Once Again You Love Me". It was released on Acid Jazz AJX193P.

A limited-edition version of released AJX193S was released on blue vinyl.

In 2012, a limited 45 rpm edition release was issued.

== Chart ==
The song spent two weeks in the UK chart. Making its entry at 22 September, 2007 at no. 22, it peaked at that position. The following week, it was at no. 87.
