= The New You! =

Studio album by Corduroy
- Released: 1997
- Recorded: 1996
- Genre: Acid jazz
- Length: 46:10
- Label: Big Cat Records
- Producer: Ben Addison, Scott Addison & Ricky Ricketts

Corduroy chronology
| Out of Here (1994) | The New You! (1997) | Clik! (1999) |

Professional ratings
Review scores
| Source | Rating |
|---|---|
| AllMusic | 4.5/5 stars |
| The Encyclopedia of Popular Music | 3/5 stars |
| NME | 1/10 |

The New You! is the fourth album by the London-based acid jazz band Corduroy, released in 1997. "The Joker Is Wild" was released as a single and reached No. 80 in the UK Singles Chart in March 1997.

== Reception ==
AllMusic awarded the album 4.5 stars, with S. T. Erlewine writing: "Working from the same acid-jazz foundation that informed their previous records, the band has added slightly ironic flourishes of lounge music and movie soundtracks while beginning to develop a sophisticated sense of pop craft, largely modeled after Steely Dan." On the other hand, Gill Whyte from NME rated the record 1/10, writing: "From the middle-class funk of Steely Dan meets The Kids From Fame, to the 'hilarious' '60s B-movie soundtracks, complete with Tijuana brass, Corduroy display an embarrassingly indulgent use of irony and ability to tell everyone else's gags very badly indeed."

== Track listing ==
| No. | Title | Music | Length |
|---|---|---|---|
| 1. | "Evolver" | Nelson-Smith, Addison, Addison | 3:20 |
| 2. | "The Joker Is Wild" | Searle, Addison, Addison | 3:05 |
| 3. | "Winky Wagon" | Addison, Addison | 3:06 |
| 4. | "Supercrime" | Addison, Addison | 3:42 |
| 5. | "Season Of The Rich" | Addison, Addison | 4:23 |
| 6. | "Designosaur" | Addison, Addison | 3:29 |
| 7. | "The Hand That Rocks The Cradle" | Addison, Addison | 3:48 |
| 8. | "(I Know Where) The Good Times Have Gone" | Addison, Addison | 3:50 |
| 9. | "Data 70" | Nelson-Smith, Addison, Addison | 3:07 |
| 10. | "Crossfire" | Searle, Addison, Addison' | 2:53 |
| 11. | "Fisherman's Wharf" | Addison, Addison | 3:41 |
| 12. | "The New You" | Addison, Addison | 2:26 |

== Personnel ==
- Ben Addison – vocals, drums
- Scott Addison – vocals, keyboards
- Simon Nelson-Smith – guitars
- Richard Searle – bass guitar
- Donald Gamble – percussion
- Sid Singh – percussion
- Mike Smith – saxophone
- Dennis Rollins – trombone
- Sid Gauld – trumpet
- The Duke Quartet – strings

== Chart positions ==
=== Single charts ===
| Year | Title | Chart | Peak position |
|---|---|---|---|
| 1997 | "The Joker Is Wild" | UK single charts | #80 |
