= Speak Low (Patrice Jégou album) =

Studio album by Patrice Jégou
- Released: May 6, 2014
- Genre: Jazz
- Length: 68:22
- Label: Prairie Star Records
- Producers: Yinka Oyelese; Mark Kibble

Patrice Jégou chronology
Speak Low (2014)	If It Ain't Love (2019)

Speak Low is the debut album by Patrice Jégou, released May 6, 2014.

== Critical reception ==
C. Michael Bailey of All About Jazz says this about Speak Low, "This is very much a throwback to a more elaborately arranged day, when it was required to wear black tie when hearing this music live. A solid recital."

Brian Zimmerman of Jazziz writes, "Her debut pop album, 2014’s Speak Low, was a 15-track exploration of the Great American Songbook that cast the budding jazz vocalist in a brilliant new light. Her career path, long and winding as it was, had delivered her to where she was supposed to be."

Jazz Music Archives quotes the album notes with this remark, "Remember the first time you heard Streisand or Renée Fleming, Celine Dion or Adele? Yes, the voice was arrestingly beautiful, but there was more: a distinctiveness that made that moment of discovery uniquely thrilling. Each is blessed with "that little something extra," as James Mason so aptly described it to Judy Garland in "A Star Is Born," that signifies true star quality. Hit "play" on track one of Speak Low, the debut release from classically-trained mezzo-soprano Patrice Jégou, and you immediately feel that same effect; that ineffable je ne sais quoi that separates the great from the merely good."

Alberta Music quotes Downbeat's Bob Doerschuck in their bio, "Jégou has recorded two jazz albums, Speak Low (2014) and If It Ain’t Love (2019), each showcasing a rare artistry and even greater promise for years to come."

== Track listing ==
No.	Title	Writer(s)	Length
1.	"Don't Sit Under the Apple Tree (with Anyone Else but Me)" (feat. Joey Kibble & Mark Kibble)	Lew Brown; Charles Tobias; Sam H. Stept	5:59
2.	"What Are You Doing the Rest of Your Life?"	Alan Bergman; Marilyn Bergman; Michel Legrand	3:19
3.	"From This Moment On" (feat. Conrad Herwig)	Cole Porter	2:35
4.	"Everyday (I Have the Blues)"	Aaron Gant; Milton Grant; John Len Chatman	4:54
5.	"I've Got the Sun in the Morning"	Irving Berlin	4:04
6.	"What a Difference a Day Made"	María Grever; Stanley Adams	4:41
7.	"Lullaby of the Leaves" (feat. Mark Kibble)	Bernice Petkere; Joe Young	6:28
8.	"Down by the Salley Gardens" (feat. Cristina Pato)	Traditional	5:06
9.	"Speak Low" (feat. The Lori Mechem Trio)	Kurt Weill; Ogden Nash	4:49
10.	"This Little Light of Mine" (feat. Kirk Whalum, Andraé Crouch and the Andraé Crouch Singers, Joey Kibble & Mark Kibble)	Harry Dixon Loes	5:38
11.	"Niño Precioso"	Traditional	4:06
12.	"The Summer Knows"	Alan Bergman; Marilyn Bergman; Michel Legrand	4:07
13.	"Walking After Midnight"	Alan Block; Donn Hecht	3:53
14.	"Til There Was You"	Meredith Willson	4:02
15.	"The Summer Knows"	Alan Bergman; Marilyn Bergman; Michel Legrand	4:41
Total length:			68:22

- Track information and credits adapted from Discogs and AllMusic, and verified from the album's liner notes
