= Corduroy (band) =

English acid jazz band

- Origin: London, England
- Genres: Acid jazz
- Years active: 1991–1999; 2007–present
- Labels: Acid Jazz Records; Big Cat Records
- Members: Ben Addison; Scott Addison; Simon Nelson-Smith; Richard Searle

Corduroy are an English acid jazz band based in London, formed around twins Ben Addison (drums/vocals) and Scott Addison (keyboards/vocals), who were previously in Sire Records act Boys Wonder (Scott had been guitarist with Boys Wonder, while Ben had been the lead vocalist). Joining the twins in the band are Richard Searle and guitarist Simon Nelson-Smith. Searle had been bass player with Doctor and the Medics, who topped the UK Singles Chart in 1986 with a cover version of "Spirit in the Sky". Searle had joined the Addison twins in the final incarnation of Boys Wonder, before the band gradually evolved into Corduroy in 1991, initially forming for a one-off New Year's Eve party.

== History ==
The self-dubbed "fabric four" primarily recorded in a film soundtrack style, and many of their tracks were instrumentals. On the release of their first album Dad Man Cat, Paul Moody wrote in the New Musical Express: "Whereas the rest of the Acid Jazz roster fidget around in a world of skinny ribbed roll-necks comparing sideburn growth, Corduroy manage to swagger through the same po-faced domain with a couldn't-care-less braggadocio... Corduroy have got their collective tongue stuck firmly in someone else's cheek here and it feels staggeringly good."

Releasing three albums on Eddie Piller's Acid Jazz Records, they received radio airplay for their single "Something in My Eye" in 1993, but national chart success evaded them, although several singles from their 1993 album High Havoc charted in the UK Independent Chart. Their 1994 album, Out of Here, reached number 73 in the UK Albums Chart.

They remained a popular live attraction, particularly on the college circuit. They also gained a healthy following in Japan, making the first of several trips to the country in 1993, and the following year they recorded a live album, Quattro - Live in Japan. After leaving Acid Jazz Records they signed to Big Cat Records, releasing two further albums: The New You! (April 1997) and the Rob Playford produced Clik! (August 1999). But when they discovered that their record label, Big Cat, had been dropped by their owner V2, Corduroy decided to split up.

Corduroy reformed and played two sell-out nights at the Jazz Cafe in Camden, London, on 16 and 17 June 2007. Searle was not involved with this incarnation of the band, working under the name of Corduroy Industries. News on their Myspace site also stated that they had completed an album of Motown covers.

Ben has also released an album of Beatles covers under the name of 'Ben from Corduroy'.

Corduroy performed a show on 17 April 2017 as the last night headliners of Le Beat Bespoké 2017 weekender at 229 The Venue in London, where they premiered four new songs from an upcoming album.

In 2018 Corduroy announced their first album in 18 years entitled Return of the Fabric Four which was praised by Record Collector's Lois Wilson as being "groovy" and "thrilling".

== Discography ==
=== Albums ===
Year	Album	Chart positions		
Year	Album	UK	UK Jazz	SCOT
1992	Dad Man Cat	—	—	—
1993	High Havoc	—	—	—
1994	Out of Here	73	2	97
1997	The New You!	—	—	—
1999	Clik!	—	—	—
2001	Quattro - Live in Japan 1994	—	—	—
2018	Return of the Fabric Four	41	8	—
2023	Men Of The Cloth	—	—	—

=== Compilations ===
- Mini!: The Best of Corduroy (1998) Music Club
- London, England (2001) Castle Music
- The Fabric Four: The Best of Corduroy (2002) Felicity
- Something in My Eye: The Best of Corduroy (2004) Castle Music
- Very Yeah - The Director's Cut: Complete Compositions 1992-1996 (2013) Cherry Red
- Rare Stock : Rarities From The Corduroy Vaults (2019) Acid Jazz
- Winky Wagon: Best of the Psy-Fi Years (2019) Well Suspect Records
- Winky Wagon 2 (2021) Well Suspect Records

=== Singles ===
Year	Title	Chart positions
Year	Title	UK
1993	"Something in My Eye"	—
1993	"The Frighteners"	—
1993	"Motorhead"	82
1994	"Mini"	76
1997	"The Joker is Wild"	80
1999	"Moshi Moshi"	37
1999	"Thing For Love"	—
"—" denotes the release failed to chart
