= Men of North Country =

Israeli soul band

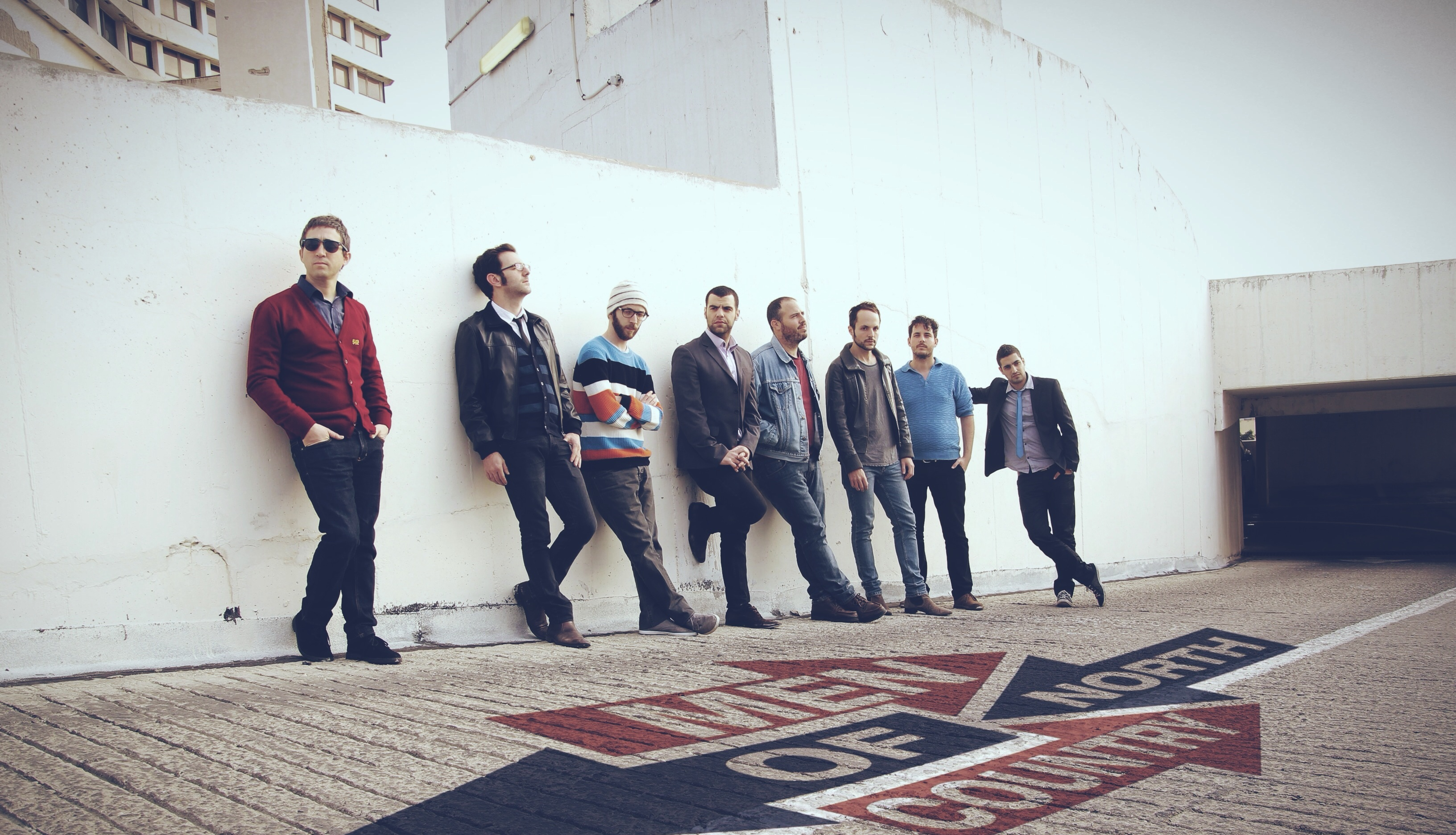

Background information
- Origin: Tel-Aviv, Israel
- Genres: Northern Soul; Mod; Indie; Soul; Soul pop
- Years active: 2008–present
- Label: Acid Jazz Records
- Members: Yashiv Cohen; Boaz Wolf; Doron Farhi; Jonathan Ydov; Ido Kretchmer; Sefi Sizzling; Ongy Sizzling; Maayan Milo

Men of North Country (MONC) is a soul band from Tel Aviv, Israel, signed to Acid Jazz Records. The band formed in 2008 and comprise lead singer Yashiv Cohen, drummer/producer Boaz Wolf, guitarist Doron Farhi, bassist Jonathan Ydov and a three-piece brass section comprising Ido Kretchmer (trombone) and siblings Sefi Sizzling (trumpet) and Ongy Sizzling (saxophone). Men of North Country currently have two studio albums released on Acid Jazz Records, The North (2012) and This City (2016).

== Biography ==
MONC came about when soul DJ Yashiv Cohen (vocals) was overheard singing along with the tunes he was playing at one of TASC (Tel Aviv Soul Club) parties. A suggestion was thrown out. He took it to his friends from the rock’n’roll band Electra – Nitzan Horesh (guitars), Doron Farhi (bass) and Boaz Wolf (drums, keys) – and then to the Sizzling Horns of Sefi Sizzling (of Funk'n'stein and The Ramirez Brothers, trumpet), his protégé baby brother Ongy Sizzling (of Coolooloosh, sax) and Israel's Supreme Court legal clerk - Ido Kretchmer (trombone). By the end of 2012, MONC introduced bassist Jonathan Ydov (of Ta'ani Esther) to their crew, while Farhi took over Horesh's place at lead guitar.

As Cohen and the Sizzlings were born and raised in the north of Israel and all are Northern soul fanatics, it was only natural to name it Men of North Country.

In 2010 MONC signed with Acid Jazz Records, who put out their debut 7", the double A-side single "Man of North Country/Debut." The single garnered positive reviews and was met with excitement all over Europe's mod and soul scene. Although the single was targeted to the European audience, it also became very popular in the band's home country of Israel. The second single, a cover version of The Human League's "Mirror Man," which was released in May 2012, was a taster from their debut album The North (produced by Wolf), that followed in June 2012. Soon after, it was chosen as "Album of the Week" in the popular German music website "Sunday Service".

Germany was also the host of MONC's first international tour in autumn 2012, where the group played in different venues all over the country. The tour was accepted with great enthusiasm, which resulted in another tour taking place in April 2013. By the end of the tour, MONC had received an offer to record some of their new songs in the all-analogue recording studio of YeahYeahYeah in Hamburg. The band agreed and recorded some new soul sweets. These tunes were released in March 2014 by the German label CopaseDisques, in the form of 2x7" vinyl - three MONC originals and a soulful cover of The Who's 1970 hit "The Seeker."

Throughout 2014-2016 the band was working on their second full album, while frequently visiting Europe for tours and festivals in Italy, Germany, The Czech Republic, France and Russia.

In July 2016, MONC's second album This City was released. The album's twelve tracks infuse northern soul, post-punk and rock and roll into heady visions of Tel Aviv's buildings, streets bedrooms, clubs and bars, suggesting a view of a culturally diverse city. The album created a strong buzz around the septet, and was followed by a live session on BBC6's Craig Charles show, which resulted in the band being invited to perform alongside Madness in the 2016 "House of Fun" weekender.

=== Albums ===
- The North (2012) Acid Jazz, LP/CD
- This City (2016) Acid Jazz, LP/CD

=== Singles ===
- "Man of North Country"/"Debut" 7” single (2010) Acid Jazz
- "Mirror Man"/"The North" 7" single (2012) Acid Jazz
- "Magic"/"The Seeker," "Boy"/"Teenage Frost (Northern Version)" 2x7" single (2014) CopaseDisques
- "I'm Com'un Home (in the Morn'un)"/"People of Tomorrow (The Visitor Remix)" 7" single (2014) Acid Jazz
