= Speak Low (band) =

Spanish band

- Origin: Madrid, Spain
- Genres: Funk, jazz-funk
- Years active: 2002–2011
- Labels: Acid Jazz Records
- Members: Julián Maeso; Jose "Funko" García; Antonio "Pax" Álvarez; Martín García; David "el Indio" García; Josué García

Speak Low or SpeakLOW is a Spanish jazz funk combo based in Madrid, that was formed in 2002. The band was founded by Julián Maeso, Jose García and Antonio Pax. They have released 2 albums and 5 singles. The band was influenced by Lonnie Smith, Brian Auger, Georgie Fame, Lou Donaldson and The Meters. The band split up in 2011, their farewell concert being only in 2012 on the Moe Black Music Festival.

== History ==
Speak Low was formed in late 2002 by Julián Maeso (of The Sunday Drivers), Antonio Pax (of La Vacazul) and Jose Funko (of Mamafunko) to play covers of classic jazz-funk, soul and boogaloo in local clubs. Later, Martín and David García would join and original compositions started to emerge. In 2003, they recorded a demo of three songs. Later, during the summer of 2004 the band recorded ten original songs, published in the spring of 2006 under the title I'm Gonna Groove Ya.

== Discography ==
=== Albums ===
- I'm Gonna Groove Ya!! (2006, Acid Jazz Records)
- Hands Up! (2009, Lovemonk)

=== Singles ===
- "Take Your Time" / "Papa Don't Take No Mess" (2005)
- "Trouble Maker" / "To My Friend Georgie" (2006)
- "Thriller" / "Unusual Tatami" (2006)
- "I Want My Money Back" / "This Letter" (2009)
- "Soul Is What You Got" / "I Don't Need No What" (2009)
