= Noel McKoy =

British soul music singer (c. 1960 – 2022)

- Born: c. 1961; London, England
- Died: 3 November 2022 (aged 60) London, England
- Genres: Soul
- Occupation: Singer
- Formerly of: James Taylor Quartet, The British Collective

Noel McKoy (c. 1961 – 3 November 2022) was a British soul music singer. His music was a collection of soul, gospel, funk and Northern soul. McKoy created, produced and presented the Dutch Pot new artist nights in London – which ran for five years. Over 300 artists including Hill St. Soul, Shaun Escoffery, Michael Jackson (writer), and Jeffrey Williams gave early performances at these nights – which proved to be pivotal to their later careers. International names topping the bill included Omar, Lynden David Hall, and Def Jam's Tashan.

McKoy cited his influences as The Beatles, Dennis Brown, Chaka Khan, Martin Luther King Jr., and Nelson Mandela.

== Biography ==
Born in South London, McKoy fronted the James Taylor Quartet in the early 1990s and has duetted with Juliet Roberts, Mica Paris, Vannessa Simon, Beverley Knight, and Ebony Alleyne. He released five solo albums and, in 2007, he recorded new songs for the record producer Ian Levine's Northern Soul 2007 and Disco 2008, the latter also featuring his sisters.

In 2018, he was interviewed for the documentary Battersea Junction - Stories from the Winstanley and York Road Estates which was put together by Wandsworth Heritage Service and Year 6 children from Falconbrook Primary School. The programme was shown on Together TV and featured the McKoy and Colorman track "Family 2000" as part of its soundtrack.

McKoy died on 3 November 2022, at the age of 60.

== Music career ==
McKoy's musical journey started when he and his siblings released the songs "I'm Lucky" and "Family" in 1989. His first album, Full Circle – Within A Social Soul was released in 1993, followed four years later by Mind Is the Keeper. In 1998, he owned his own record label, Right Track Records, and released his third album, Please Take This Personal. His fourth solo album, Brighter Days, was released in 2009 on soul label Tri-Sound, and featured the singles "Jealousy" as well as the title track. As recently as 2021, he teamed up with ex-UB40 sax player, Brian Travers, and reggae-fusion trumpet player Patrick Anthony Tenyue to release the self-penned track, "Liberation", for TEK2 Productions.

== Albums ==
- Full Circle – within a spiritual social soul (1993) (as 'McKoy')
- Mind Is the Keeper (1997)
- Please Take This Personal (1998)
- Brighter Day (2009)
- Cut From The Same Cloth (2013) (as 'McKoy')
- People Make Change (2019)
