= James Taylor Quartet =

British jazz funk band

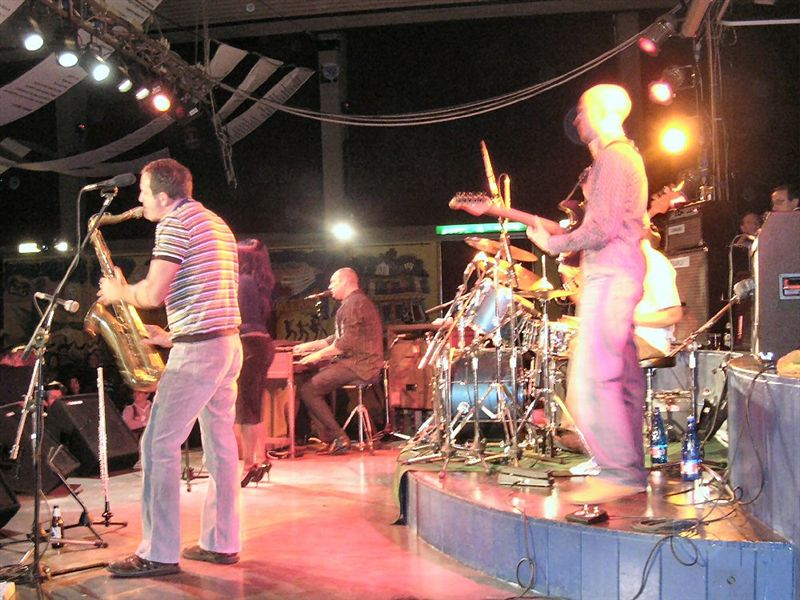
- James Taylor Quartet (November 2005, Forlì, Italy)

Background information
- Origin: Rochester, Kent, England
- Genres: Acid jazz, jazz funk
- Years active: 1985–present
- Labels: Bruton, Polydor, Real Self, Ubiquity Records, Acid Jazz
- Members: James Taylor; Mark Cox; Andrew McKinney; Pat Illingworth; Yvonne Yanney
- Past members: John Willmott; Graeme Flowers; Paul Carr; Chris Montague; David Taylor; Dominic Glover; Noel McKoy; Andrew McGuinness; Wolf Howard; Allan Crockford; Neil Robinson; Gary Crockett; Steve White
- Website: jtq.co.uk

The James Taylor Quartet (or JTQ) are a British four-piece jazz funk band formed in 1985 by Hammond organ player James Taylor following the break-up of his former band the Prisoners, and in the wake of Stiff Records' bankruptcy. The band consists of James Taylor (organ), Mark Cox (guitar), Andrew McKinney (bass), and Pat Illingworth (drums). Recordings and live performances often include vocalist Yvonne Yanney.

== Film theme beginnings ==
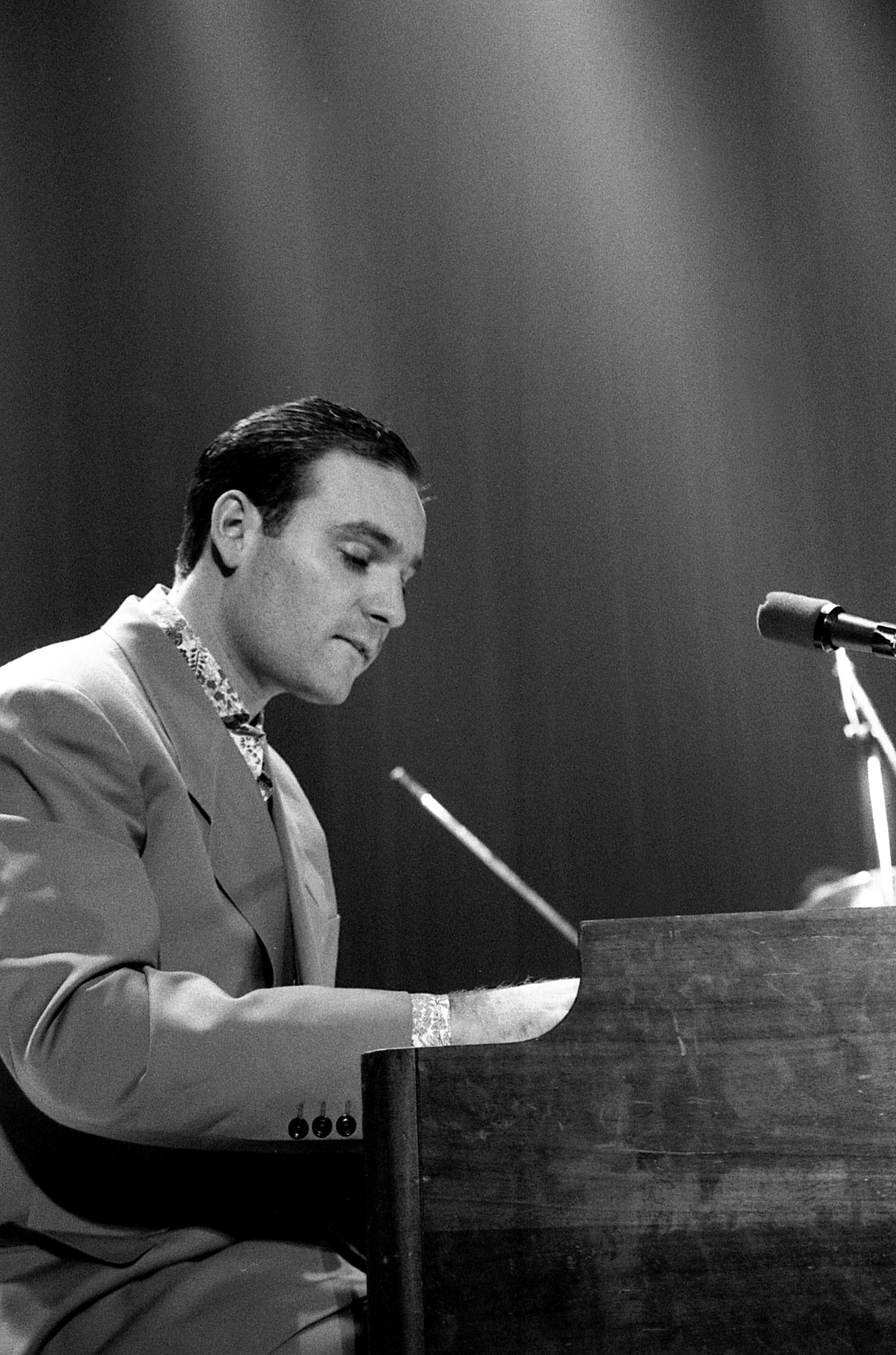
James Taylor Quartet at Club Citta, Japan, 1989

The James Taylor Quartet's first single, "Blow-Up" (a funked-up version of Herbie Hancock's main theme from the seminal 1960s film of the same name), was released in 1987 on the Re Elect the President label, which would later become the Acid Jazz label. The track was championed by the NME and John Peel, appearing in Peel's Festive Fifty chart for 1987. The band's debut seven track mini album, Mission Impossible (1987) followed and predominantly comprised covers of 1960s film themes such as "Alfie", "Mrs. Robinson" and "Goldfinger" in a rough, up-tempo, almost punk-like style, that was primarily focused on Taylor's Hammond organ playing. Their second album, The Money Spyder (1987), was the soundtrack to an imaginary spy film, applying the band's style to Taylor's own compositions.

While promoting these albums, the James Taylor Quartet developed a reputation as a live band. The live set emphasized on rhythm driven music, with elements of modern dance music, despite including a lot of improvised solos. The band recorded their signature tune "The Theme from Starsky and Hutch" featuring Fred Wesley and Pee Wee Ellis of the JBs in 1988 and this was included on their next album Wait a Minute (1988). Their popularity as a live act led to the release of the live album Absolute – JTQ Live in 1991, which attempted to capture the experience of the band in concert (even though it was recorded 'live' in the studio, the audience cheering being overdubbed later).

== Emergence of acid jazz ==
In the early 1990s, the band changed direction and released a string of song-based albums to appeal to the then fashionable soul and acid jazz scene in the UK. They featured vocalists such as Rose Windross of Soul II Soul, Alison Limerick and Noel McKoy. McKoy became a permanent member of the band for part of this period. The single "Love the Life" reached the top 40 and the accompanying album Supernatural Feeling (1993) reached the top 30 on the UK Albums Chart. The next album In the Hand of the Inevitable (1995), featuring Alison Limerick as guest vocalist on three songs, saw a return to the Acid Jazz label, where it remains the label's biggest selling album.

== Return to funk roots ==
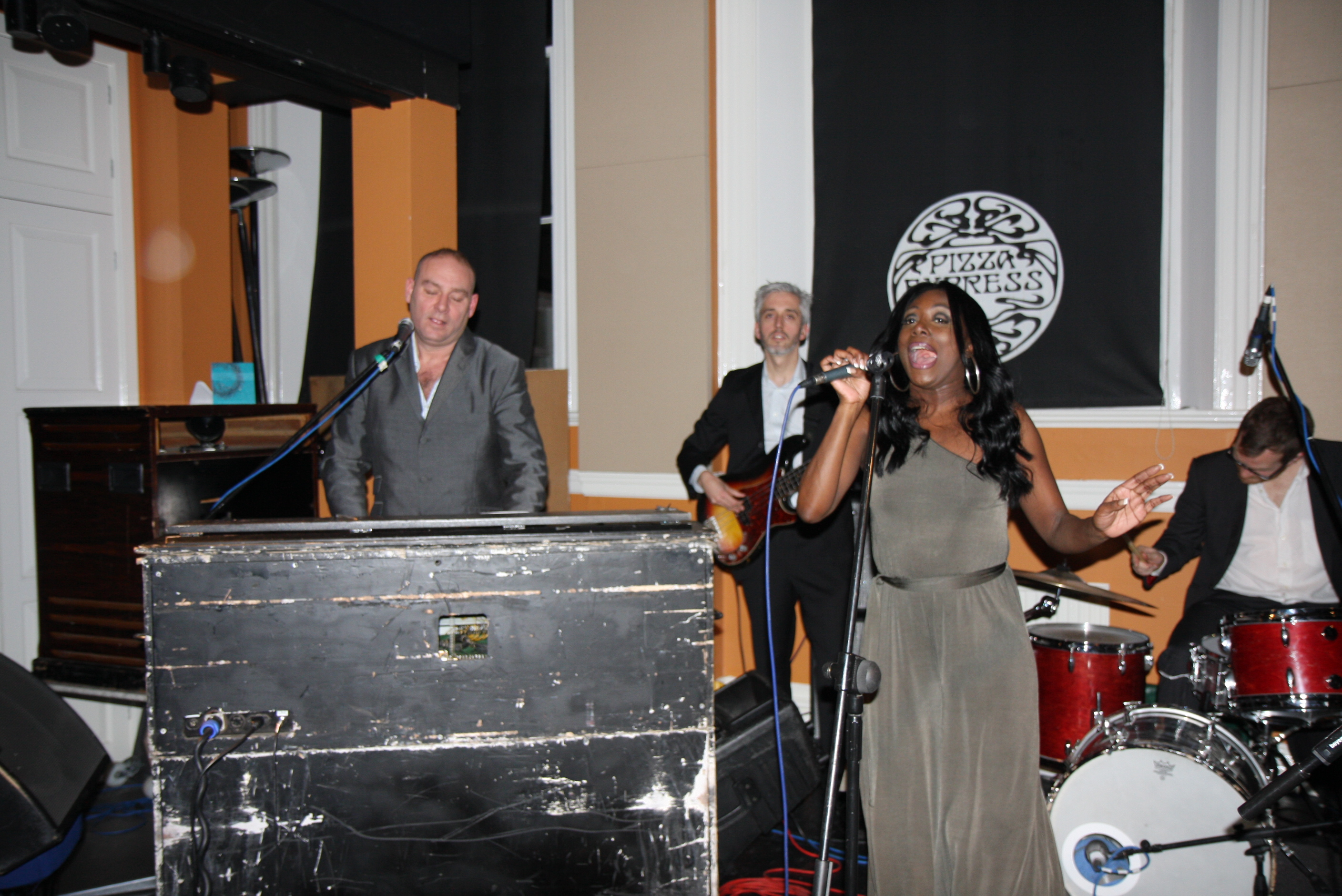
The James Taylor Quartet in Pizza Express, Maidstone, England, December 2010, with vocalist Yvonne Yanney

Since then, the James Taylor Quartet have returned to their original style of instrumental Hammond-led jazz funk workouts on albums. Cover versions such as "Whole Lotta Love", "Dirty Harry" and "Jesus Christ Superstar"' are still recorded in the same spirit as the band's debut "Blow-Up" single, but the albums are mainly original compositions. Live gigs regularly feature a vocalist and showcase songs from the soul period of the band. They received a Music of Black Origin nomination for their second live album Whole Lotta Live (1998).

== Collaborations and other projects ==
The James Taylor Quartet produced a bona-fide film theme of their own, when they contributed to the soundtrack of the first Austin Powers film. As well as their own recordings, James Taylor and members of the quartet have collaborated with Tom Jones on the duets album Reload and featured on records by the Wonder Stuff, Manic Street Preachers, the Pogues, Kingmaker and U2. They were also the house band on Gaby Roslin's short-lived Channel 4 chat show in 1996.

In the late 1990s, James Taylor began composing and recording library music for the Bruton Music company. A series of releases were made available for use by the media industry in TV advertisements, programmes, films etc.

The James Taylor Quartet have also released three albums under the name New Jersey Kings. These are similar in style to the core funky Hammond sound of JTQ, but have tended to be recorded live in the studio resulting in a more natural yet raw sound.

Some performances during 2005 included an augmented horn section and have been promoted as the James Taylor Funk Orchestra. During 2005, Nigel Price (guitar) replaced David Taylor.

== Soundtrack from Electric Black ==
As part of the EFG London Jazz Festival, the James Taylor Quartet were backed by a full orchestra when they played at Cadogan Hall in London on 21 November 2018 for the premiere performance of their new album Soundtrack from Electric Black, which preceded the album's release on 30 November on Audio Network.

It was originally intended for production use only, but Audio Network decided to put Soundtrack from Electric Black forward for a full commercial release.

== Discography ==
=== Albums ===
- Mission Impossible (Re–elect the President, 1987; Acid Jazz, 1993)
- The Money Spyder (Re–elect the President, 1987; Acid Jazz, 1993)
- Wait a Minute (Urban/Polydor, 1988)
- Get Organized (Urban/Polydor, 1989)
- Do Your Own Thing (Urban/Polydor, 1990)
- Absolute – JTQ Live (Big Life; Polydor, 1991)
- Supernatural Feeling (Big Life; Polydor, 1993) – with Noel McKoy
- Extended Play (Acid Jazz, 1994)
- The BBC Sessions (Nighttracks, 1995; Strange Fruit, 1997)
- In the Hand of the Inevitable (Acid Jazz, 1995)
- (A Few Useful Tips About) Living Underground (Acid Jazz, 1996)
- Whole Lotta Live 1998 (JTI, 1998)
- Penthouse Suite [live] (Acid Jazz, 1999)
- A Bigger Picture (Gut, 1999; Instinct, 2001)
- Message from the Godfather (Ubiquity, 2001)
- Room at the Top (Sanctuary, 2002)
- The Oscillator (Rootdown, 2003)
- A Taste of Cherry (Real Self, 2006)
- James Taylor's 4th Dimension: Picking Up Where We Left Off (Real Self, 2007)
- Don't Mess with Mr. T – James Taylor Quartet Plays Motown (Dome, 2007)
- Live at the Jazz Cafe (Real Self, 2008)
- New World (Real Self, 2009)
- The Template (ChinChin, 2011)
- Closer to the Moon! (Real Self, 2013)
- The Rochester Mass (Cherry Red, 2015)
- Bumpin' on Frith Street – Live at Ronnie Scott's (Gearbox, 2016)
- Soundtrack from Electric Black (Audio Network, 2018)
- People Get Ready (We're Moving On) (Audio Network, 2020)
- Baker's Walk (Audio Network, 2021)
- Man in the Hot Seat (Audio Network, 2022)
- Hung Up On You (JTI, 2024)

=== Library albums ===
- Retro Acid Jazz (Bruton Music, 1995)
- Swinging London (Bruton Music, 2000) [16 full tracks, 48 tracks with the commercial breaks/cuts included]
- Swinging London: The Library Sessions (Bruton Music, 2000) [12 track version of the 16 track release]
- The Hustle (Bruton Music, 2004)
- The Cinema Sessions (Bruton Music, 2007) [2CD]
- Funky Keys (Bruton Music, 2016)
- Quick Fire: The Audio Network Sessions (Cherry Red, 2017)

=== Compilation albums ===
- The First Sixty Four Minutes (Re–Elect The President, 1988) [re-package of Mission Impossible and The Money Spyder; 2LP-on-1CD; re-released as 1987]
- Creation (Acid Jazz [USA], 1997)
- Blow Up! – A JTQ Collection (Music Club, 1998)
- The Best of the Acid Jazz Years (Acid Jazz [Japan], 1999)
- Mission Impossible & in the Hand of the Inevitable (Recall 2 cd/Snapper Music, 1999) [2CD]
- The Very Best of the James Taylor Quartet – The Gold Collection (Acid Jazz, 2000) [2CD]
- The Live Best of the James Taylor Quartet – The Gold Collection (Fine Tune, 2000)
- Espionage: The Very Best of the James Taylor Quartet (Metro, 2001)
- Check It Out: Best of the Acid Jazz Years (Recall 2 cd/Snapper Music, 2001) [2CD]
- The Collection (Spectrum/Universal, 2001) [compilation of Wait A Minute, Get Organized, Do Your Own Thing, Absolute – JTQ Live]
- Hammond–Ology: The Best of the James Taylor Quartet (Sanctuary, 2001) [2CD]
- Hammond a Go–Go: The Best of Acid Jazz (Not Bad Records, 2014) [2CD]

=== New Jersey Kings albums ===
- Party to the Bus Stop (Acid Jazz, 1992)
- Stratosphere Breakdown (Acid Jazz, 1995)
- Uzi Lover (JTI, 2001)
