= Acid Jazz Records =

British record label

- Founded: 1987
- Founder: Gilles Peterson; Eddie Piller
- Genre: Acid jazz
- Country of origin: UK
- Location: London
- Official website: www.acidjazz.co.uk

Acid Jazz Records is a record label based in East London formed by Gilles Peterson and Eddie Piller in 1987. The label is the namesake of the acid-jazz subgenre of jazz music for which it is most famously known for producing.

== Background ==
The label's first signing was singer-songwriter Rob Gallagher's band, Galliano, which released the label's first single "Frederick Lies Still" in 1987, which features a sample of "Freddie's Dead" by Curtis Mayfield. The label was known in its early days for putting on club nights at Camden's Dingwalls featuring artists such as The Night Trains and A Man Called Adam.

In 1989, after Peterson left in order to create his own label Talkin' Loud, Acid Jazz signed a second wave of artists including the Brand New Heavies, who released their self-titled debut album in 1990, Corduroy, Mother Earth, and Jamiroquai, who released their debut single "When You Gonna Learn" on the label in 1992.

Throughout the 1990s, the label also put out a number of compilation albums, most notably the Totally Wired series which covered the range of influences and sounds within the acid-jazz genre, as well as what was being released on the label at that time.

In 1993, Piller, the label's owner purchased a night-club which he named the Blue Note. Initially used as a way of promoting the record label's music, the club soon built up a large reputation and was open seven nights a week hosting various different club nights including that of musician Goldie's Metalheadz label.

After the closing of the Blue Note in the late 1990s the label somewhat shifted its focus from producing just acid-jazz and its similar genres of music to that of soul and mod. The mid-2000s saw the signing of Andy Lewis and the release of his top 40 Northern Soul inspired single "Are You Trying to Be Lonely?" featuring Paul Weller on vocals. The label also released the "Rare Mod" series, a collection of rare 7" vinyl EPs from the 60's, presented in a picture sleeves, as well as accompanying compilation albums.

In 2007, "Stuck in a Wind Up" was released. Credited to Lord Large feat. Clem Curtis, it was backed with "Move Over Daddy". In a review of Lord Large's The Lord's First XI album, Record Collector referred to "Stuck in a Wind UP" as a slice of breezy, upbeat soul so authentic that it sounded like it was recorded in the late 1960s. It was also one of the three songs referred to by Mojo as the highlights of the album. Mojo also wrote that it was the perfect Northern Soul dance floor filler. It had some belated success, three years after Curtis' death. It had a week in the iTunes chart, peaking at #54 on 3 April 2022.

The label has celebrated its 25th anniversary and re-issued a number of its best-selling records, such as The Brand New Heavies and The People Tree, as well as putting out a special 6-CD box set, including an artwork book and DVD. This period saw the label sign more contemporary soul artists such as New Street Adventure and Men of North Country, as well as the folk-rock of British actor Matt Berry.

In 2017, the label issued a previously unreleased single by soul-singer Leroy Hutson, "Positive Forces", as well as releasing an anthology of his work. In 2018, they re-issued his two most popular albums, Hutson and Hutson II, and produced "Leroy Hutson: The Man, a short four-part online documentary. For their 30th anniversary celebrations, they released compilation album "Jazz on the Corner" featuring song choices by Eddie Piller and his friend Martin Freeman, while Corduroy released their first album in 18 years, "Return of the Fabric Four".

A new wave of signings since 2020 have included American soul singer Gloria Scott, former The Style Council vocalist Dee C. Lee, and the UK jazz group Nimbus Sextet. The label has recently collaborated with Argentinian producer Kevin Fingier for the Acid Jazz subsidiary label Fingier Records, as well as Bob Thiele Jr. and Flying Dutchman Records on the release of the Billy Valentine album Billy Valentine and The Universal Truth in 2023.

== Staff ==
- Eddie Piller - founder, chairman
- Dean Rudland - general manager

== Roster ==
- Akimbo
- Andy Bennett
- The Brand New Heavies
- The Broken Vinyl Club
- Tony Christie
- Corduroy
- Clem Curtis
- Graham Dee
- Detroit City Council
- Dexters
- The Dilemmas
- DJ Naked
- Carl Douglas
- The Elements
- Emperors New Clothes
- Erobique
- Chris Farlowe
- The Filthy Six
- The Fleur De Lys
- The Frays
- Geno Washington & The Ram Jam Band
- Goldbug
- Grand Union
- Humble Souls
- Jarvis Humby
- Leroy Hutson
- Gregory Isaacs
- The James Taylor Quartet
- Jamiroquai
- Janice Graham Band
- Jarvis Humby
- Jimmy James and the Vagabonds
- John's Children
- Jasmine Kara
- Jinrai
- Kenny Bernard & The Wranglers
- Dee C. Lee
- Laville
- Le Leo
- Lord Large
- Andy Lewis
- Freddy Mack
- Mama Terra
- Manasseh Meets The Equalizer
- Matt Berry
- A Man Called Adam
- Men of North Country
- Mister Exe
- The Moons
- Mark Morriss (of The Bluetones)
- Mother Earth
- New Street Adventure
- Night Trains
- Nimbus Sextet
- The Ossie Layne Show
- Parlour Talk
- Dean Parrish
- Pleasurebeach
- The Apostles
- The Red Inspectors
- The Richard Kent Style
- The Sandals
- Satisfaction
- Skunkhour
- Smoove
- Snowboy
- Speak Low
- The Stabilisers
- Sharon Tandy
- The Third Degree
- Tito Lopez Combo
- Tony and Tandy
- Twisted Tongue
- Billy Valentine
- Paul Weller
- Benjamin Zephaniah

== Totally Wired Radio ==
Totally Wired Radio was set up by Acid Jazz Records in 2019 as an extension of their original series of Totally Wired compilations compiled by Eddie Piller and Gilles Peterson. As well as playing the kind of sounds Acid Jazz Records and Piller are generally known for (when compiling compilations such as Eddie Piller presents British Mod Sounds of The 1960s) the stations output also includes country music, library music, reggae, film soundtracks, EDM, Afrobeat, Latin, punk, psyche and disco.

As well as assisting with the signing of artists on Acid Jazz, General Manager Dean Rudland helped put together the Totally Wired series. Whilst working for Acid Jazz Rudland met Tony Harlow, who worked for Blue Note Europe. The pair released a number of compilations which collectively became "The Blue Series".
