= Cecil Sharp Project =

2011 folk music project

The Cecil Sharp Project was a multi-artist, residential commission to create new material based on the life and collections of Cecil Sharp, founding father of the British folk revival.

The project was a joint commission between the English Folk Dance and Song Society (EFDSS) and the Shrewsbury Folk Festival. Overall management of the project was the responsibility of Shrewsbury Folk Festival and was directed by Neil Pearson and Alan Surtees.

The residential took place in March 2011, immediately followed by concerts in Shrewsbury and London. The artists also performed the results of the project at the Shrewsbury Folk Festival in August 2011.

== Artists ==
The eight musicians selected for the project were Andy Cutting, Caroline Herring, Steve Knightley, Jim Moray, Jackie Oates, Leonard Podolak of The Duhks, Scottish fiddler Patsy Reid, and Kathryn Roberts. All of the artists chosen were from the United Kingdom except for Herring (United States) and Podolak (Canada).

== Dates ==
- March 18–25, 2011. Residential at Acton Scott, Shropshire
- March 24, 2011. Performance at Theatre Severn, Shrewsbury
- March 26, 2011. Performance at Cecil Sharp House, London
- March 27, 2011. Performance at Cecil Sharp House, London
- August 28, 2011. Performance at Shrewsbury Folk Festival, Shrewsbury

== CD ==
The initial three performances were recorded for a CD release, with a release date 30 August 2011. As with the Shrewsbury Folk Festival's previous commission, the Darwin Song Project, the CD was mixed by Stu Hanna,
