= Albion: An Anthology =

Compilation album by Chris Wood
- Released: 29 June 2009
- Genre: Folk/Traditional
- Label: Navigator Records

Chris Wood chronology
Trespasser (2008)	Albion: An Anthology (2009)	Handmade Life (2010)

Albion: An Anthology is a 2009 compilation album by the English folk musician and composer Chris Wood and released on the Navigator Records label. The album features selections from many of Wood's solo contributions, each track remastered and personally chosen by Wood himself.

== Track listing ==
Disc one
No.	Title	Writer(s)	Length
1.	"The Shouter" (from Half as happy as we, 1999)	Chris Wood	3:47
2.	"I Feel a smile coming on" (from Half as happy as we, 1999)	Chris Wood	5:38
3.	"The Colour of Amber" (from Ghosts, 2004)	traditional	3:00
4.	"Albion" (from The Lark Descending, 2005)	Chris Wood	5:45
5.	"Down The Wagon Way / Sweet Jayne / The North Downs Way" (from Knock John, 1999)	traditional / traditional / Chris Wood	11:33
6.	"Summerfield Avenue" (from Trespasser, 2008)	Chris Wood	4:17
7.	"Lusignac" (from Lusignac, 1995)	Chris Wood	3:15
8.	"One in a Million" (from The Lark Descending, 2005)	Hugh Lupton	9:51
9.	"Hares on the Mountain / Elizabeth Clare" (from Lusignac, 1995)	Chris Wood / Chris Wood	5:27
10.	"The Farmer" (previously unreleased, 2009)	traditional	6:30

Disc two
No.	Title	Writer(s)	Length
1.	"Cold Haily Rainy Night" (from The Imagined Village, 2007)	traditional	6:14
2.	"The Land: when the land is white with snow" (from May Monday, 2001)	Chris Wood	6:14
3.	"Mad John" (from Trespasser, 2008)	Chris Wood	6:15
4.	"The Mari Llwyd" (from Ghosts, 2004)	Hugh Lupton	5:19
5.	"Valtz Efter Tor Lohne / Retour de Montaignac / Waltz Harry Lane" (from Lisa, 1993)	traditional / Frederic Paris / Andy Cutting	11:03
6.	"The Taoist Tale" (from Wood, Wilson, Carthy, 1998)	Tucker Zimmerman	4:49
7.	"John Ball" (from Trespasser, 2008)	Sydney Carter	7:26
8.	"Copernicus" (from Ghosts, 2004)	Robert Harbron	4:40
9.	"The History Man / Roseville Fair" (from Chris Wood & Andy Cutting, 1990)	Andy Cutting / Bill Staines	6:46
10.	"Pace Egging / Ribatz" (Crossing, 1999)	traditional	5:20
11.	"Walk this World with Music" (from The Lark Descending, 2009)	Chris Wood	6:31

== Personnel ==
- Chris Wood – composition, author, arrangement
- Andy Cutting – arrangement
- Karen Tweed – arrangement
- Ian Carr – arrangement
- Hugo Morris – photography
