= Astwood Bank =

District of Redditch, Worcestershire, England

Coordinates: 52.260238°N 1.937501°W

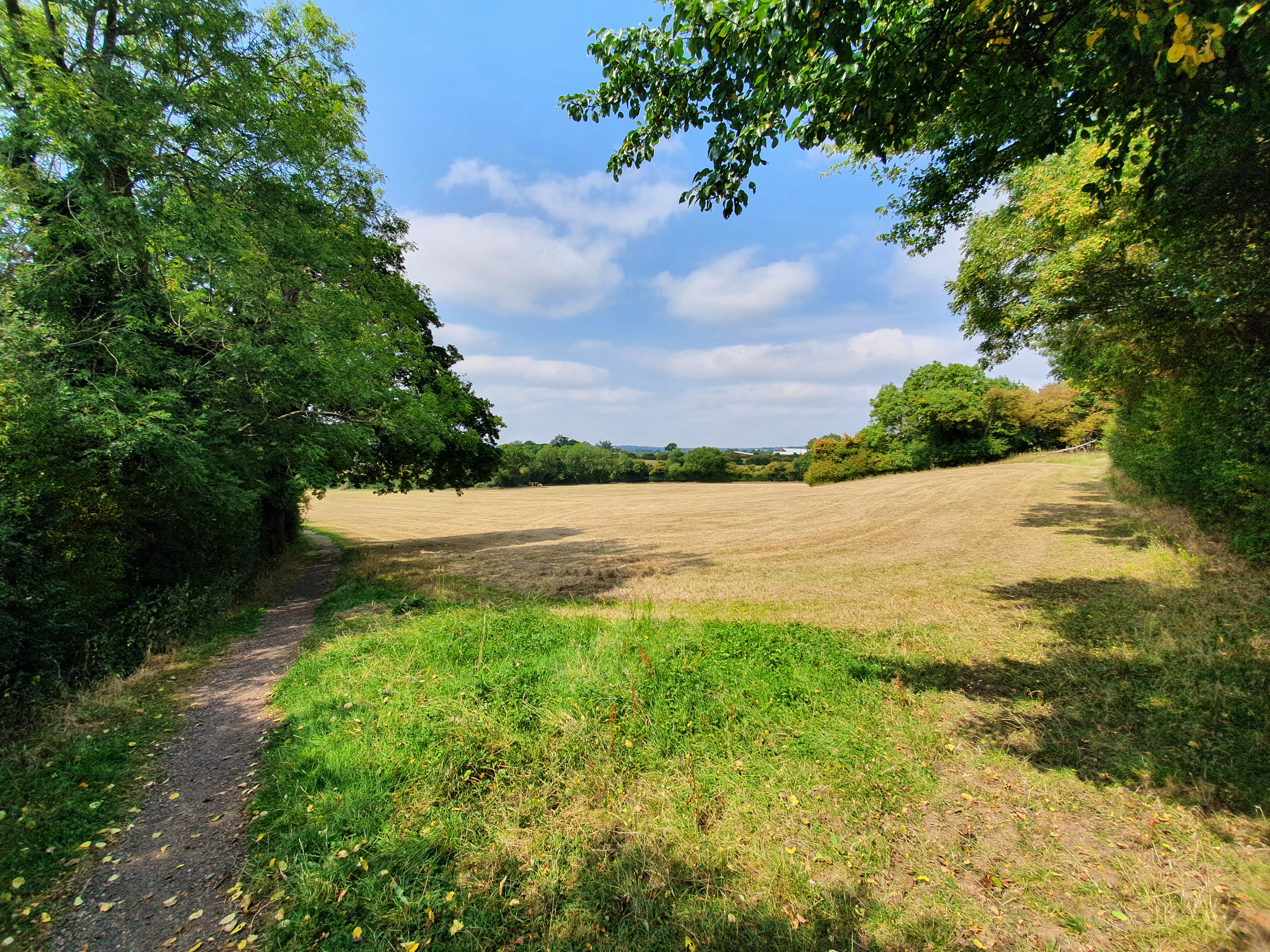
- Astwood Bank, Nr Brandon Brook

- Location within Worcestershire
- District: Redditch
- Shire county: Worcestershire
- Region: West Midlands
- Country: England
- Sovereign state: United Kingdom
- Post town: REDDITCH
- Postcode district: B96
- Dialling code: 01527
- Police: West Mercia
- Fire: Hereford and Worcester
- Ambulance: West Midlands
- UK Parliament: Redditch

Astwood Bank is large village situated in Worcestershire, England, a borough of the town of Redditch and close to the Warwickshire border. Historically recognised as a global centre for the needle-making industry, the village features a mix of historic Victorian architecture and modern residential developments.

Community and events

The village maintains an active civic life, largely supported by volunteer organisations. The Astwood Bank Community Group (ABCG) operates various local initiatives, most notably the "Astwood Bank in Bloom" project, which provides and maintains floral displays and planters throughout the village streets year-round. The ABCG also organises public seasonal events, including the village's annual Christmas lights switch-on.

A prominent annual event is the Astwood Bank Carnival, typically held over a weekend in July. The carnival features a procession of floats along Evesham Road, the crowning of a carnival royalty, live music, and a funfair. Run entirely by a local volunteer committee, the event serves as a major fundraising platform, distributing thousands of pounds annually to local charities and community projects.

Local economy and amenities

The commercial centre of Astwood Bank is concentrated along Evesham Road, which functions as a traditional village high street. It supports a micro-economy of independent businesses and essential services, allowing residents local access to daily amenities.

Retail and service offerings include a local butcher, bakery, post office, convenience stores, pharmacy, and several hair salons. The village is also home to a number of established public houses, including The Bell and The Oddfellows Arms, which serve both the local population and visitors.

Parks and recreation

The village is served by several public green spaces. The most prominent is Astwood Bank Park, which contains a children's play area, a skate park, and a small wooded area, while residents also have access to Overdale Park and local community allotments.

Due to its rural location, Astwood Bank sits adjacent to the historic Ridgeway. This provides residents and walkers with direct access to an extensive network of public footpaths and bridleways extending into the surrounding Worcestershire and Warwickshire countryside.

Transport

Astwood Bank is located along the A441, providing direct road links north to Redditch and Birmingham, and south towards Evesham. The village is situated near the M42 and M5 motorways. The closest rail hub is Redditch railway station, which acts as the southern terminus of the Cross-City Line, providing regular, direct train services into Birmingham New Street.

Sport

Astwood Bank is noted for its successful cricket team, who have twice played at Lord's in the National Village Knock Out Final.

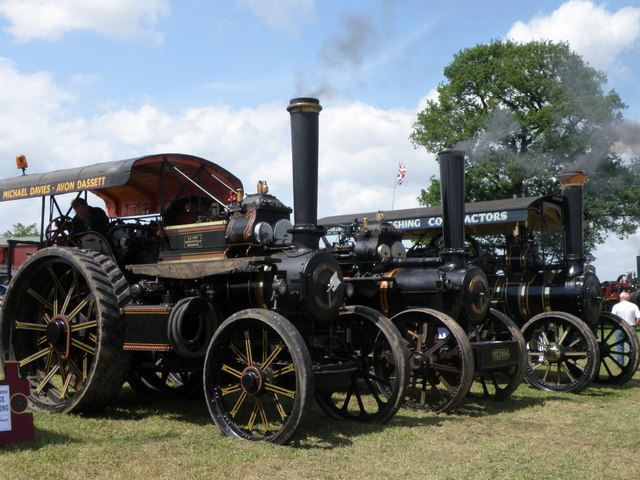
Traction Engines can regularly be seen in the village

== History ==
=== Church ===
Residents held church services in the local school until a church was built in 1883–84. The foundation stone was laid by Lady Georgina Vernon of Hanbury Hall. The church of St. Matthias & St. George was originally designed by W. J. Hopkins as a large church with a south tower, only the east end was completed by him in 1884. The nave was added by W. Cogswell in 1911 and consecrated by Bishop Louis Mylne. The tower was never built hence the deep sloping roof.

The church was built as a chapelry of Feckenham. It became an independent parish in 1950.

=== Railway station ===
A railway station called Studley & Astwood Bank railway station served the district, with service going as far north as Lichfield Trent Valley and as far south as Tewkesbury. The line was closed in 1964 so now Redditch railway station is the end of the line. The station building still exists as a domestic dwelling house and is located on the Slough, just into Green Lane, Studley, Warwickshire. It is about two miles from Astwood Bank and one mile from Studley.

== Politics ==
Politically, Astwood Bank is part of the Astwood Bank and Feckenham ward. The councillors are:

- Craig Warhurst (Conservative)-(Astwood Bank & Feckenham)
- Brandon Clayton (Conservative)-(Astwood Bank & Feckenham)
- Chris Holz (Conservative)-(Astwood Bank & Feckenham)

== Education ==
The district is served by Astwood Bank Primary School and Ridgeway Secondary School.

== Notable residents ==
- Lionel Britton (1887–1971) was a working class writer from Astwood Bank.
- Dan Sealey of Ocean Colour Scene and Merrymouth was born in Astwood Bank.
- Adam Barry of Merrymouth and co founder of Americana band The Misers has lived in Astwood Bank since leaving school in 1996.
- Charlie Clemmow, actress.

== Climate ==
Since records began in 1976, the highest temperature recorded at the weather station was 37.9 °C (100.2 °F) on 13 August 2026 and the coldest was −14.5 °C (5.9 °F) on 12 December 1981.

Climate data for Astwood Bank 108m amsl (1991–2020) (extremes 1976–present)
Month	Jan	Feb	Mar	Apr	May	Jun	Jul	Aug	Sep	Oct	Nov	Dec	Year
Record high °C (°F)	14.3 (57.7)	17.6 (63.7)	23.7 (74.7)	26.1 (79.0)	33.6 (92.5)	34.0 (93.2)	37.1 (98.8)	37.9 (100.2)	30.1 (86.2)	27.7 (81.9)	17.5 (63.5)	14.8 (58.6)	37.9 (100.2)
Mean daily maximum °C (°F)	7.1 (44.8)	7.9 (46.2)	10.6 (51.1)	13.8 (56.8)	17.0 (62.6)	19.9 (67.8)	22.1 (71.8)	21.6 (70.9)	18.7 (65.7)	14.3 (57.7)	10.0 (50.0)	7.3 (45.1)	14.2 (57.5)
Daily mean °C (°F)	4.3 (39.7)	4.7 (40.5)	6.7 (44.1)	9.1 (48.4)	12.1 (53.8)	15.0 (59.0)	17.1 (62.8)	16.8 (62.2)	14.3 (57.7)	10.8 (51.4)	7.0 (44.6)	4.5 (40.1)	10.2 (50.4)
Mean daily minimum °C (°F)	1.5 (34.7)	1.5 (34.7)	2.8 (37.0)	4.5 (40.1)	7.3 (45.1)	10.1 (50.2)	12.0 (53.6)	12.0 (53.6)	10.0 (50.0)	7.3 (45.1)	4.0 (39.2)	1.8 (35.2)	6.2 (43.2)
Record low °C (°F)	−13.0 (8.6)	−10.2 (13.6)	−8.5 (16.7)	−4.9 (23.2)	−3.0 (26.6)	0.9 (33.6)	4.9 (40.8)	3.5 (38.3)	1.8 (35.2)	−3.2 (26.2)	−8.2 (17.2)	−14.5 (5.9)	−14.5 (5.9)
Average precipitation mm (inches)	61.5 (2.42)	47.7 (1.88)	46.8 (1.84)	51.2 (2.02)	59.4 (2.34)	60.4 (2.38)	63.4 (2.50)	66.2 (2.61)	57.7 (2.27)	73.7 (2.90)	70.1 (2.76)	64.8 (2.55)	722.9 (28.47)
Average precipitation days (≥ 1.0 mm)	12	10	10	10	9	9	9	10	10	12	13	12	126
Source: Starlings Roost Weather
