= Adam Barry =

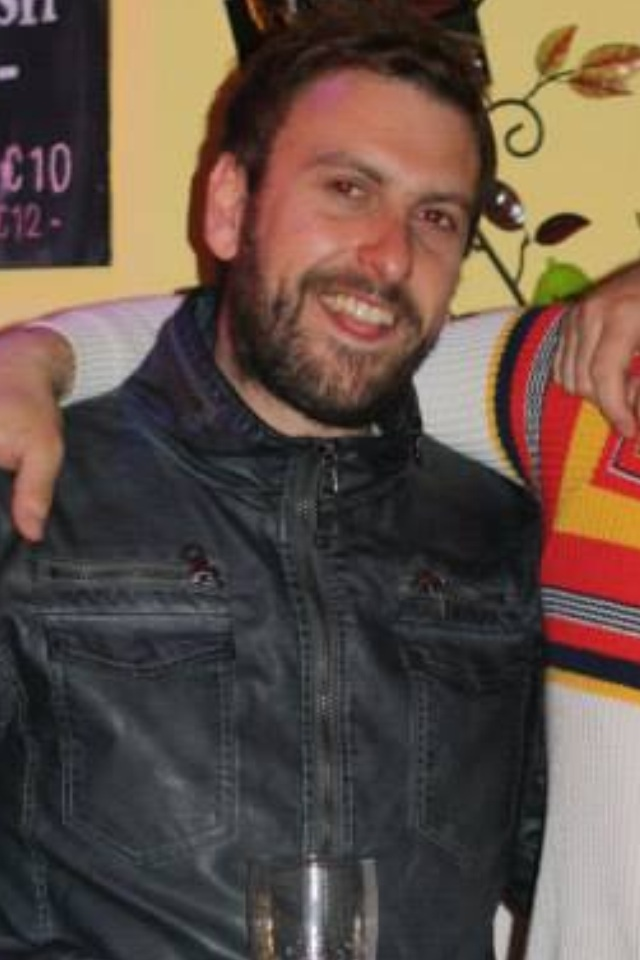
- Adam Barry at The Spirit Store, Dundalk, Ireland May 2014

Background information
- Born: 4 April 1981 (age 44); Worcester, England
- Origin: Callow End, Worcestershire, England
- Genres: Americana, Folk
- Occupation: Musician
- Instruments: Piano, hammond organ
- Years active: 1998–present
- Labels: Navigator Records

Adam Barry (born 4 April 1981) was the English Hammond organ/piano/accordion/harmonica/backing vocalist for the folk group Merrymouth, led by Barry, Simon Fowler and Dan Sealey from Ocean Colour Scene. Before joining Merrymouth, Barry was a co-founder member of the band The Misers.

== The Misers ==
The Misers (Fronted by Neil Ivison and Barry) were an Americana band, based in Worcestershire, they released their debut album Amplified Life Stories in 2010, recorded at Rockfield Studios.

As well as their own UK and European tours, The band have toured the UK on two occasions with Scottish duo The Proclaimers. Barry has performed and appeared live with The Misers on BBC, ITV, BSkyB, and BBC Radio 2 on numerous occasions.

Barry left the band in 2011 after the death of his father. Barry's final show was at The Huntingdon Hall Theatre in Worcester, where the band donated all of their fee to St Richards Hospice where Barry's father had died.

== Merrymouth ==
In 2012, Barry received a call from Simon Fowler asking him to play piano on tour whilst he was promoting his debut solo album Simon Fowlers Merrymouth, featuring guest appearances from John McCusker and Andy Cutting. Following on from the success of the first album and tour, Barry joined the band on a full-time basis.

in 2014, now called Merrymouth, Sealey, Fowler and Barry returned with their second album, Wenlock Hill, which Barry co produced with Sealey. The album once again features McCusker, and a special appearance from Chas Hodges of Chas and Dave

== Personal life ==
Barry is the cousin of Katrina Hart, an English athlete who won a gold medal for England at the 2010 Commonwealth Games competing in women's 100 m T37 (athletes with cerebral palsy). Hart has and won multiple medals at the IPC Athletics World Championships.
