= Single Flame =

Studio album by Lucy Ward
- Released: 19 August 2013
- Genre: Folk music; Singer-songwriter
- Length: 48:43
- Label: Navigator Records
- Producer: Stu Hanna

Lucy Ward chronology
Adelphi Has to Fly (2011)	Single Flame (2013)	I Dreamt I Was a Bird (2015)

Singles from Single Flame
- 1. "For the Dead Men" Released: 29 January 2012

Professional ratings
Review scores
Source	Rating
The Guardian	4/5 stars

Single Flame, the second album of British singer-songwriter Lucy Ward, was released in the United Kingdom by Navigator Records on 19 August 2013. It was critically acclaimed and received a four-starred review in The Guardian.

== Songs ==
The album includes "For the Dead Men", a self-penned protest song, which was released as a single in January 2012 coupled with a remixed version of "Maids When You’re Young" (a song that had been included on Ward's debut album Adelphi Has to Fly.

== Reception ==
In a four-starred review for The Guardian, Robin Denselow said that Lucy Ward "proves to be an even more mature and thoughtful singer-songwriter than she was on Adelphi Has to Fly" and described her follow-up album as "impressive and original" and "a brooding, often angry set that deals with everything from politics to love, death and personal tragedy, with a couple of powerful traditional songs added in".

Hazel Davis, for americanaUK, described it as a much angrier album than her debut release but "a genuinely eclectic sounding collection" with "songs that are Thea Gilmore-good".

Simon Holland, for Folk Radio UK, said that the album was "charged, emotive and utterly compelling".

== Track listing ==
1. "I Cannot Say I Will Not Speak" (Lucy Ward) 4:04
2. "Honey" (Stu Hanna/Lucy Ward) 3:41
3. "The Last Pirouette" (Lucy Ward) 3:55
4. "Icarus" (Lucy Ward) 5:14
5. "Velvet Sky" (Stu Hanna/Lucy Ward) 4:13
6. "Rites of Man" (Lucy Ward) 5:08
7. "The Consequence" (Lucy Ward) 2:15
8. "Lord I Don't Want To Die in the Storm (Stu Hanna/Lucy Ward) 4:09
9. "For the Dead Men" (Lucy Ward) 4:25
10. "Marching Through the Green Grass" (Traditional) 2:50
11. "Ink" (Lucy Ward) 4:11
12. "Shellback" (Lucy Ward) 4:38

Total album length = 48:43

== Personnel ==
- Lucy Ward – vocals, guitar, concertina
- Izzl Cooper – cello
- Anna Esslemont – violin (on "For the Dead Men")
- Joy Gravestock – violin
- Sebastian Hale Smith – double bass
- Debbie Hanna – backing vocals
- Stu Hanna – guitar, banjo, mandolin, fiddle, B3 organ and backing vocals
- Sam Pegg – bass guitar
- Stephen MacLachlan – drums

== Production ==
Single Flame was produced by Stu Hanna from Megson, who also performs on the album, with his wife Debbie Hanna providing backing vocals. The photography and artwork on the CD cover was by Elly Lucas.
