= Megson =

Megson may refer to:

- Megson (surname)
- Megson (band) an English folk duo
