= Merrymouth =

English folk rock band

- Origin: Warwickshire, Worcestershire, England
- Genre: Folk rock
- Instruments: Guitar, Piano, Hammond, Violins, Accordion, Brass, Harmonica
- Years active: 2012–present
- Label: Navigator Records
- Past members: Simon Fowler; Dan Sealey; Mike McNamara; Adam Barry
- Website: www.merrymouth.net

Merrymouth was a folk-oriented band founded by Ocean Colour Scene songwriter and vocalist Simon Fowler (guitar/vocals), Dan Sealey (guitar/piano/vocals), Mike McNamara (Bass/Piano/Organ/Guitar/Percussion) and later Adam Barry (piano/organ/accordion/harmonica/vocals).

== History ==
Merrymouth released their debut album as Simon Fowler's Merrymouth on 26 March 2012. Recorded at Gospel Oak Studio, Warwickshire, they were joined in the studio by award-winning folk musicians John McCusker and Andy Cutting. They toured the album throughout 2012 and 2013, and performed at BBC Radio 2's CarFest for champion of the band Chris Evans, Moseley Folk and Arts Festival, and The Edinburgh Fringe Festival. Founding Merrymouth bassist/songwriter Mike McNamara introduced Simon to John McCusker and subsequently Simon presented John with the 'Musician of the Year' accolade at the BBC Radio 2 Folk Awards. They later became close friends, and McCusker appeared on Ocean Colour Scene's A Hyperactive Workout for the Flying Squad album in 2005, and joined them on numerous occasions at live shows. Simon subsequently went on to record backing vocals for McCusker's then-wife Kate Rusby's Underneath The Stars album.

== Recent years ==
Founding member Mike McNamara left to form The Little Ships (with Happy Chichester of The Afghan Whigs and Stone Gossard of Pearl Jam) and Merrymouth released their second album, Wenlock Hill, recorded at Rockfield Studios. A collection of new songs, Wenlock Hill again features McCusker (violin), and includes a special guest appearance from Chas Hodges of Chas and Dave. The album charted at #69 in the UK Official Album Charts.

In 2016 Merrymouth announced that Sealey and Barry would be returning with a new project called Merrymaker.

== Discography ==
- Simon Fowler's Merrymouth (2012)
- Wenlock Hill (2014)
