= Wenlock Hill (Merrymouth album) =

Studio album by Merrymouth
- Released: 5 May 2014
- Studio: Rockfield Studios, UK
- Genre: Folk rock
- Label: Navigator
- Producer: Dan Sealey, Adam Barry

Merrymouth chronology
Simon Fowler's Merrymouth (2012)	Wenlock Hill (2014)

Wenlock Hill is the second album by Merrymouth, a folk band featuring Simon Fowler and Dan Sealey from Ocean Colour Scene, and Adam Barry. It was released in May 2014 and entered the UK Official Album Charts at #69.

== Track listing ==
All songs are written by Simon Fowler, unless stated

1. "Wenlock Hill"
2. "Salt Breeze"
3. "Blink of an Eye" (Sealey)
4. "Being Without You"
5. "I Am the Resurrection" (Ian Brown, John Squire)
6. "That Man" (Sealey)
7. "Teashop Serande"
8. "Duchess" (The Stranglers)
9. "He Was a Friend of Mine" (Traditional, new words and arrangement Jim McGuinn with additional lyrics by Fowler, Sealey, Barry)
10. "If You Follow"
11. "The Ragged Spiral" (Fowler, Sealey)

The lyrics to the song "He Was a Friend of Mine" have been adapted to be about the killing of John Lennon.

== Personnel ==
- Simon Fowler – vocals, acoustic guitar
- Dan Sealey – vocals, guitars
- Adam Barry – piano, Hammond organ, accordion, vocals
- John McCusker – violins
- Chas Hodges – piano
