= Adelphi Has to Fly =

Studio album by Lucy Ward
- Released: 13 June 2011
- Studio: Greengage Studio and West End Road Studios
- Genre: Folk music; singer-songwriter
- Producer: Stu Hanna

Lucy Ward chronology
Adelphi Has to Fly (2011)	Single Flame (2013)

Professional ratings
Review scores
Source	Rating
The Guardian	4/5 stars
AllMusic	3.5/5 stars

Adelphi Has to Fly, the debut album of British singer-songwriter Lucy Ward, was released in the United Kingdom by Navigator Records on 13 June 2011. It was critically acclaimed and received a four-starred review in The Guardian.

Lucy Ward is accompanied on the album by Sam Pegg, Belinda O'Hooley and Heidi Tidow from O'Hooley & Tidow and by Debbie and Stu Hanna from Megson. The album was produced by Stu Hanna.

== Songs ==
The songs on the album include the Child ballad "The Two Sisters" and "Death (Rock Me to Sleep)", based on a poem said to have been written by Anne Boleyn, set to a tune by Lucy Ward.

"Alice in the Bacon Box", a song written by Ward in the style of a traditional folk song, tells the story of Derbyshire hermit Alice Grace (1867–1927) from Little Eaton who, on being evicted from her cottage, lived in a box previously used for storing bacon, which had been given to her by the local butcher.

Ward performed "Stitch in Time" by Mike Waterson at the BBC Radio 2 Folk Awards in 2009. A shorter (3:37) recording of this song is included on the third CD of the album BBC Radio 2 Folk Awards 2009.

Ward's version of "Maids When You're Young", a traditional song popularised by The Dubliners, was nominated for best traditional track at the BBC Radio 2 Folk Awards 2012. It was included on the first CD of the album BBC Radio 2 Folk Awards 2012.

== Reception ==
The album was critically acclaimed. Alex Gallacher, for Folk Radio UK, described it as an "exceptionally talented debut". Robin Denselow, in a four-starred review for The Guardian, said: "[T]his mature and varied set matches painful laments against the occasional humorous song. She may be surrounded by established musicians, but doesn't rely on them, as she proves with her unaccompanied treatment of A Stitch in Time, Mike Waterson's story of a wife's revenge against a drunken husband. Elsewhere, she provides a delicate solo vocal on The Fairy Boy, before being joined by Belinda O'Hooley's bravely sparse piano accompaniment, and demonstrates more gutsy singing on a rousing Maids When You're Young. But the best songs are the bleakest: Death is a thoughtful setting for verses supposedly written by Anne Boleyn before her execution, while Bricks and Love is a self-composed ballad of death and the folk scene, based on a true story. It's the most poignant new song I've heard this year." Allan Wilkinson, for Northern Sky music magazine, said: "The traditional songs are each delivered with a confidence and expressiveness, unusual for one so young...A truly exceptional debut."

== Track listing ==
No.	Title	Writer(s)	Length
1.	"The Fairy Boy"	Samuel Lover (c.1840)	3:37
2.	"Alice in the Bacon Box"	Lucy Ward	4:00
3.	"Maids When You're Young" (Roud 210)	traditional, arranged by Lucy Ward	3.27
4.	"Death (Rock Me to Sleep)"	words attributed to Anne Boleyn, music by Lucy Ward	3:33
5.	"The Unfortunate Lass" (Roud 2; Laws Q26/B1; G/D 7:1404)	traditional, arranged by Lucy Ward	4.07
6.	"Julia"	Lucy Ward	4.58
7.	"The Two Sisters" (Roud 8; Child 10; G/D 2:213)	traditional, arranged by Lucy Ward	4.02
8.	"Adelphi"	Lucy Ward	4.22
9.	"F for Love"	Lucy Ward	4.21
10.	"A Stitch in Time"	Mike Waterson	4.14
11.	"Bricks and Love"	Lucy Ward; chorus taken from "Eriskay Love lilt"	4.21

== Musicians ==
- Lucy Ward – vocals, concertina, guitar, percussion
- Stu Hanna – banjo, mandolin, acoustic guitar, backing vocals
- Sam Pegg – bass
- Belinda O'Hooley – piano, backing vocals
- Heidi Tidow – backing vocals
- Debbi Hanna – backing vocals

== Production ==
The album was produced by Stu Hanna and was recorded at Greengage Studio and West End Road Studios.

The cover photography on the CD was by Elly Lucas.

== Legacy ==
Ward's song "Old Alice in the Bacon Box" inspired several paintings by the artist Bartholomew Beal of Derbyshire's folklore, people and the industrial history of the Derwent Valley Mills heritage site that were exhibited at Derby Museum and Art Gallery from September to November 2013.
