= Shrewsbury Folk Festival =

Shrewsbury Folk Festival is an annual festival of folk and world music and traditional dance held in the town of Shrewsbury in Shropshire, England.

It takes place over four days on and around the UK Late Summer bank holiday weekend (usually the last weekend in August). The first Shrewsbury festival was held in 2006, but it was a direct successor to the Bridgnorth Folk Festival, which was first held in 1997. The 2006 Shrewsbury event was staged at The Quarry, but in 2007 a move was made to the larger West Midlands (later known as Shropshire Agricultural) Showground, where all subsequent festivals have been held.

The festival was headed by festival directors Alan Surtees and Sandra Surtees who both started the Bridgnorth Folk Festival in 1997 up until Alan's untimely death in 2017, since then Sandra has continued to organise both the festival and events that come under the 'Shrewsbury Folk Festival' banner.

The festival's patrons are John Jones of Oysterband and Steve Knightley of Show of Hands (since 2011). Both Oysterband and Show of Hands have performed at the festival on more than one occasion.

== Artists who have appeared at Shrewsbury ==
Artists booked for the first Shrewsbury Folk Festival in 2006 included Seth Lakeman and the Doonan Family Band. The 2007 festival featured Paul Brady, Bellowhead, Show of Hands, Kate Rusby, Kerfuffle and 4Square. Headline acts at the 2008 festival were Richard Thompson, The Duhks, Bellowhead, Oysterband, Lunasa and the Demon Barber Roadshow. The 2009 festival was notable for featuring artists who contributed to the Darwin Song Project, both collectively and individually, along with headlining acts Seth Lakeman, Eric Bibb, Show of Hands (supported by the Spooky Men's Chorale), the Dhol Foundation and The Proclaimers. 2010 saw headlining appearances by Afro Celt Sound System, Bellowhead, Billy Bragg, Adrian Edmondson and the Bad Shepherds, Dervish, and the Michael McGoldrick Big Band. (Cara Dillon, although booked to play at the 2010 festival and featured in festival publicity, was unable to appear.)

Headlining acts at the festivals since 2010 have been:

2011: The Imagined Village, Oysterband and special guests, Bellowhead, Show of Hands, Cara Dillon, 17 Hippies, Kepa Junkera Band and the Cecil Sharp Project.

2012: Richard Thompson, Kate Rusby, Show of Hands, Dervish and Blowzabella. KT Tunstall, although booked, was unable to appear. Instead Stage 2 headliners The Treacherous Orchestra were promoted to headline the main stage on the final day and the festival was concluded by a "Folk Slam" organised at short notice by Jim Moray and featuring various artists and surprise guests, including Maddy Prior. The experiment was repeated at the 2013 festival and featured reprise performances by artists who had already played at the event.

2013: Afro Celt Sound System, Carolina Chocolate Drops, The Be Good Tanyas, Oysterband, Eddi Reader, Capercaillie, Nidi d'Arac, Heidi Talbot and special guests, and the Tim O'Brien Band. The festival was concluded by a special "Patrons' Set" featuring John Jones and Steve Knightley with special guests.

2014: Seth Lakeman, Dhol Foundation, Bellowhead, The Full English, Blackie and The Rodeo Kings and Steve Knightley's Wake The Union, a special performance playing Show Of Hands` Wake The Union album featuring Lenny Podolak, Matt Gordan, Rex Preston & Miranda Sykes and Phillip Henry & Hannah Martin.

2015: The 2015 festival included Kate Rusby, Oysterband, La Bottine Souriante and Sharon Shannon among others.

2016: The 2016 festival included Tom Robinson Band, The Levellers, Show of Hands, Raghu Dixit, Dervish and Guests among many other musicians and bands.

2017: The festival in 2017 featured appearances from Eric Bibb, Loudon Wainwright III, Oysterband, The Unthanks, Seth Lakeman, Jon Boden, La Machine and Faith Folk and Anarchy (Martyn Joseph, Steve Knightley and Tom Robinson) amongst many more acts.

2020: The festival was postponed until 2021 due to the COVID-19 pandemic and the effect of flooding from the river Severn on the festival's site in February of that year.

2021: Kate Rusby, Oysterband, Show of hands, The Christians, Afro Celt Sound System.

2022: Judy Collins, Show of Hands, Skerryvore, Carlos Nunez, Blackie and the Rodeo Kings, Ukulele Orchestra of Great Britain.

2023: Billy Bragg, Oysterband, Joachim Cooder, Capercaillie, Moya Brennan, Breabach, Eddi Reader, and Red Hot Chili Pipers.

Other artists to have appeared at the festival since 2006 (some more than once) include: Le Vent du Nord, Crooked Still, Loudon Wainwright III, The Wailin' Jennys, Patrick Street, Kathryn Tickell Band, Rory McLeod, Steve Tilston, Richard Shindell, Lucy Kaplansky, Breabach, Genticorum, Jim Moray, Pete Morton, Karine Polwart, Megson, Mark Erelli, Caroline Herring, Jackie Oates, Lau, Chris Wood, Andy Cutting, John McCusker, Kris Drever, Nancy Kerr and James Fagan, Boo Hewerdine, Calan, Sarah Jarosz, John Otway and Wild Willy Barrett, Ukulele Orchestra of Great Britain, Bella Hardy, Salsa Celtica, Peatbog Faeries, Les Barker, Sam Carter, Jon Boden and the Remnant Kings, Nic Jones and Martyn Joseph. Legendary singer Judy Collins appeared at the Festival in 2022.

== The Launchpad ==
The Launchpad showcases up and coming talent on the Village Stage. It is an opportunity for bands, duos or singer songwriters to pitch for one of the three places available each year.

Previous winners include:

2023: Alex Lord, The Ashen Keys and Suzy Wall

2022: Caleb Richards, Good Habits and Trefusis

== Cecil Sharp Project ==
In March 2011, the festival, in conjunction with the English Folk Dance & Song Society (EFDSS) teamed up to organise the Cecil Sharp Project, a multi-artist commission to create new material based on the life and collections of the founding father of the English Folk Revival Cecil Sharp.

On 18 March 2011 eight artists gathered together in Acton Scott, Shropshire, to write and rehearse the material. The new work was premiered at Theatre Severn, Shrewsbury, on 24 March 2011, after which the artists went to London for two further concerts at Cecil Sharp House on 26 and 27 March 2011. The concerts were professionally recorded and mixed for CD release in September 2011. The artists involved in the project were Steve Knightley, Andy Cutting, Leonard Podolak, Jim Moray, Jackie Oates, Caroline Herring, Kathryn Roberts and Patsy Reid.

== Darwin Song Project ==
In March 2009, to celebrate the 200th birthday of Charles Darwin (who was born in Shrewsbury), the festival commissioned the Darwin Song Project, a multi-artist residential project for one week, with the brief to create new works with a 'relevance and resonance' to the life and work of Darwin.

The artists involved were Chris Wood, Karine Polwart, Jez Lowe, Stu Hanna, Mark Erelli, Rachael McShane, Emily Smith and Krista Detor

A professional CD and DVD, recorded at a special performance at Theatre Severn in Shrewsbury and produced by Hanna, was released in August 2009. The Project was also featured in performance by all eight original artists at that year's Shrewsbury Folk Festival.

== Dance ==
Traditional dance is an important element of the festival and numerous Morris dance sides and other traditional dance teams perform on the Village stage, around the festival site and in the Dance Tent, where audience participation is encouraged and accompaniment of traditional dance tunes is provided by artists such as the Oyster Ceilidh Band (an acoustic version of Oysterband). Traditional dance is also taken into the town centre during the festival weekend, with sides performing in the square in front of the Old Market Hall and the Castle grounds, with a procession through the streets between the two on the Saturday afternoon.

== Work in Schools ==
The Festival also runs a regular schools project, which usually takes place in June each year, that sees established traditional folk groups working in Shropshire primary schools for a week.

In the last few years this project has seen the musicians working with all year groups in the schools, but also working intensively with 30 children that culminates in a performance at the Theatre Severn where the whole school community is invited to a free show with the 30 children performing on stage with the band.

The 30 children and their families are then invited to the festival in August, where the show is performed on the second stage.

Since 2007 the number of musicians involved in the schools' project is 422.
