= The Trees They Grow So High =

British folk song

Song
- Published: 1700s
- Genre: Scottish folk

"The Trees They Grow So High" is a Scottish folk song (Roud 31, Laws O35). The song is known by many titles, including "The Trees They Do Grow High", "Daily Growing", "Long A-Growing" and "Lady Mary Ann".

A two-verse fragment of the song is found in the Scottish manuscript collection of the 1770s of David Herd. This was used by Robert Burns as the basis for his poem "Lady Mary Ann" (published 1792). The subject of the song is an arranged marriage of a young woman by her father to a boy who is much younger than she. There are numerous versions of both the tune and lyrics. In one set of lyrics the groom is twelve when he marries and a father at 13.

According to Roud and Bishop:

"Judging by the number of versions gathered in the major manuscript collections and later sound recordings, this song has been a firm favourite with singers in Britain, Ireland and North America for a long time, the wording varies surprisingly little across the English versions and the story is always the same, and these probably derive from nineteenth-century broadside printings, of which there are many."

== Lyrics ==
=== Version One ===
The trees they grow high,
the leaves they do grow green
Many is the time my true love I've seen
Many an hour I have watched him all alone
He's young,
but he's daily growing.

Father, dear father,
you've done me great wrong
You have married me to a boy who is too young
I'm twice twelve and he is but fourteen
He's young,
but he's daily growing.

Daughter, dear daughter,
I've done you no wrong
I have married you to a great lord's son
He'll be a man for you when I am dead and gone
He's young,
but he's daily growing.

Father, dear father, if you see fit
We'll send him to college for another year yet
I'll tie blue ribbons all around his head
To let the maidens know that he's married.

One day I was looking o'er my father's castle wall
I spied all the boys a-playing at the ball
My own true love was the flower of them all
He's young, but he's daily growing.

And so early in the morning
at the dawning of the day
They went out into the hayfield
to have some sport and play;
And what they did there,
she never would declare
But she never more complained of his growing.

At the age of fourteen, he was a married man
At the age of fifteen, the father of a son
At the age of sixteen, his grave it was green
Have gone, to be wasted in battle.
And death had put an end to his growing.

I'll buy my love some flannel
and I will make a shroud
With every stitch I put in it,
the tears they will pour down
With every stitch I put in it,
how the tears will flow
Cruel fate has put an end to his growing.

An even older version in a book "A North Countrie Garland, edited by James Maidment," published in 1824, includes the lyrics of the song "The Young Laird of Craigston." Those ancient words say that he had been married at age twelve, had a son at age thirteen, and was dead at age fourteen. However, one must not jump to the conclusion that the earliest version is the most accurate. There is no official record found to substantiate that Elizabeth Innis had had a baby with John Urquhart Jr. However, Elizabeth had remarried Alexander Lord Brodie and records prove that she had three children by him. Records also show that John Urquhart Jr. had been born in 1611 and his wife, Elizabeth Innis, had been born in 1621 (so she had been 10 years younger than Lord Craigston). Elizabeth's brother, Adam Innis of Reidhall, had a daughter, Jane Innis, who had married Thomas Pitt (aka Diamond Pitt, who had purchased the Pitt diamond from the remnants of the kingdom of New Sarum, India, while under orders to cease trading).

=== Version Two ===
The trees they grow so high and the leaves they do grow green,
And many a cold winter's night my love and I have seen.
Of a cold winter's night, my love, you and I alone have been,
Whilst my bonny boy is young, he's a-growing.
Growing, growing,
Whilst my bonny boy is young, he's a-growing.

O father, dearest father, you've done to me great wrong,
You've tied me to a boy when you know he is too young.
O daughter, dearest daughter, if you wait a little while,
A lady you shall be while he's growing.
Growing, growing,
A lady you shall be while he's growing.

I'll send your love to college all for a year or two
And then in the meantime he will do for you;
I'll buy him white ribbons, tie them round his bonny waist
To let the ladies know that he's married.
Married, married,
To let the ladies know that he's married.

I went up to the college and I looked over the wall,
Saw four and twenty gentlemen playing at bat and ball.
I called to my true love, but they would not let him come,
All because he was a young boy and growing.
Growing, growing,
All because he was a young boy and growing.

At the age of sixteen, he was a married man
And at the age of seventeen he was a father to a son,
And at the age of eighteen the grass grew over him,
Cruel death soon put an end to his growing.
Growing, growing,
Cruel death soon put an end to his growing.

And now my love is dead and in his grave doth lie,
The green grass grows o'er him so very, very high.
I'll sit and I'll mourn his fate until the day I die,
And I'll watch o'er his child while he's growing.
Growing, growing,
And I'll watch o'er his child while he's growing.

== Background ==
The ballad was printed on numerous broadsides. For copies of some of these see the Bodleian Library at the University of Oxford in Great Britain.

The words may have been based on the 17th-century wedding of Lord Craigston, John Urquhart to Elizabeth Innes and her subsequent marriage to Alexander Brodie in 1635. She was several years older than Brodie. Baring-Gould and other scholars note, however, that the ballad may be older.

Arrangers of this early folk song include English composer Benjamin Britten. British composer Patrick Hadley wrote The Trees So High, a "symphonic ballad" on a version of the tune and lyrics for chorus, baritone solo, and orchestra.

== Recordings ==
=== Field recordings ===
Dozens of authentic field recordings have been made of the song, including a 1907 phonograph recording of David Penfold, the landlord of the Plough Inn at Rusper in Sussex, made by the English composer and folk music collector Ralph Vaughan Williams. English traditional singers Fred Jordan of Ludlow, Shropshire and Walter Pardon of Knapton, Norfolk were recorded singing their traditional versions of the song in the 1960s and 1970s. A recording of May Bradley (also of Ludlow), which can be heard online via the Vaughan Williams Memorial Library, was probably the recording that inspired many of the popular versions. Several versions have been recorded in Scotland, including one sung by Shelia Stewart in 1960. Like most popular British folk songs, the song has appeared many times in North America, across the United States and Canada.

=== Popular recordings ===
Since the 1960s, the song has appeared on albums by many folk-influenced artists, including Joan Baez, who included it on her second album, Joan Baez, Vol. 2 in 1961, as well as Martin Carthy's first LP in 1965. Another famous version appeared on Alan Stivell's best-selling 1972 album Olympia live (À L'Olympia). The song was also recorded by Pentangle on their Sweet Child album, Steeleye Span on Now We Are Six (as "Long-A-Growing"), and by Angelo Branduardi (Italian version "Gli Alberi Sono Alti") on his La Luna in 1975. Sarah Brightman also recorded the song on her album of the same name. An a cappella version appears on Brenda Wootton's 1975 album Starry Gazey Pie, sung in two-part harmony with Robert Bartlett.

This song was released again as "The Trees, They Do Grow High" by the California-based folk band Golden Bough on their self-named album in 1981. The song was then included on the album "Contemporary Songs: The Nigh Wind", originally released in 2001.

In 2002 the song was recorded under the title "Daily Growing" by the Irish band Altan, with Mairead Ní Mhaonaigh singing and Paul Brady contributing as guest singer, on the album The Blue Idol. It has been performed in concert by Scottish singer-songwriter Donovan under the title "Young But Growing". It was also recorded by Bob Dylan during The Basement Tapes sessions, but was released later on the bootlegs of The Genuine Basement Tapes and later, A Tree With Roots. On November 4, 2014, it appeared on the official release, The Bootleg Series Vol. 11: The Basement Tapes Complete. In 2009, Show of Hands used the first verse as a refrain on their song "IED", from their album Arrogance Ignorance and Greed.

In 2012, Merrymouth, a folk band led by Simon Fowler of Ocean Colour Scene recorded the song for their eponymous album.

The Voice of the People includes two recordings by traditional singers: The Bonny Boy sung by Fred Jordan on Volume 3: O’er His Grave the Grass Grew Green: Tragic Ballads, and Young But Growing, sung by Mary McGarvey on Good People, Take Warning: Ballads by British and Irish Traditional Singers.

The Scottish singer Alasdair Roberts sometimes performs the song unaccompanied, as an encore.

Irish folk singer Cara Dillon made a free arrangement of the story called "He's Young But He's Growing".

English folk group The Longest Johns released a version of this song on their YouTube channel in 2024.
