= A Different Thread =

A Different Thread 'Over Again' album cover. Photo by Chloe Noblit

A Different Thread (Robert Jackson, Alicia Best) Photo by Alex Goodfred

A Different Thread performing at Green Note in London. Photo by Thomas Hughes

A Different Thread is a folk/Americana band centered around the collaboration between multi-instrumentalists Alicia Best (USA) and Robert Jackson (UK). They met by chance in 2016 while busking in Galway, Ireland, and began writing and performing together, officially forming as A Different Thread in 2017 at Shrewsbury Folk Festival. Their music blends British folk rock traditions with American roots styles, including Appalachian, old-time, alt-country, and North Carolina Piedmont blues influences. They are known for their vocal harmonies, award winning songwriting, and minimalistic stripped back acoustic instrumentation.

Based in Durham, North Carolina, as of 2024, they have toured across the United States, United Kingdom, Europe, Mexico, and Guatemala. Their work has received praise from outlets including Americana UK, Rolling Stone Germany, RnR Magazine, Glide Magazine, FATEA Magazine, Folking, BBC, and NPR-affiliated regional programming.

== Members ==
- Robert Jackson (born April 6, 1989) Nuneaton UK – vocals, guitar, harmonica, banjo, keys. (School of Art and Design University of the West of England, Bristol, Illustration)
- Alicia Best (born September 1, 1988) Manhattan, NYC, US – fiddle, singer-songwriter. (Bennington College Performing Arts)

They have performed with different session musicians both in the recording studio and on tour including:

- Mike Seal (2021-present) (Prof. Dr.) from Birmingham, UK – double bassist and songwriter. Also known for his work with the band Blue Soup.
- The folk duo, Farefeld (AKA Chris Elliott and Caitlin Jones) – flutes, backing vocals, bouzouki, harmonium, fiddle.
- Isaac Collier (2016-2017) (born October 15, 1988), North Yorkshire Moors, England – classically trained cellist (Royal Birmingham Conservatoire)
- Alan Best (2017-present) (born February 8, 1992) Durham, North Carolina, US (also known for work with band: "Tan & Sober Gentlemen"– accordion and mandolin
- Gerson Rivera, from Mexico – cello

== Discography ==
A Different Thread has released two EPs and one album.

- Home from Home (EP) – April 8, 2017
- High Time (EP) – October 1, 2017
- On a Whim (LP) – September 13, 2018
- Some Distant Shore (EP) – May 22, 2020
- Call of the Road (LP) – September 1, 2022
- Over Again (LP) – May 1, 2026

== History ==
Formation and early years (2016–2018)

Best and Jackson met in 2016 while busking in Galway, Ireland. According to interviews and press materials, they began performing together immediately and later formed A Different Thread as a songwriting partnership built around transatlantic touring and collaboration.

The duo released two EPs in 2017, Home from Home and High Time, followed by their debut album On a Whim (2018).

Following its release, the duo toured in the United Kingdom and United States, developing recognition on the independent folk circuit.

== On A Whim and early touring (2018-2020) ==
Their debut album 'On a Whim' established A Different Thread’s transatlantic sound. Early reviews noted the duo’s harmony-led approach and acoustic arrangement style. During this period, the duo continued touring across the UK and US, performing in folk venues and house concert circuits while adopting a transient lifestyle which allowed them to keep collaborating in person.

== Some Distant Shore and Call of the Road (2020–2022) ==
In 2020, A Different Thread released the EP 'Some Distant Shore', which included interpretations of traditional folk material and expanded instrumentation.

Their second studio album Call of the Road (2022) reflected life on tour and periods of involuntary separation between the United Kingdom and United States. FATEA Magazine noted its themes of distance and resilience within a folk framework.

== Over Again (2026–present) ==
The band's third album 'Over Again' was released on May 1st 2026. It was recorded across multiple locations including the duo’s tiny-home studio, Betty’s in Chapel Hill, North Carolina, and Alma Vale Studio in Bristol, England. The album was the last project to be recorded in the long-standing studio with producer/engineer Luke Cawthra.

The album reflects themes of transition, arrival, hope, grief, and renewal, shaped by the duo’s experience of long-distance relationships, forced separation due to visas and border closured in the COVID-19 pandemic, and eventual relocation to the United States.

The album received positive reviews from independent Americana and folk publications including Americana UK, FATEA Magazine, Folking, and Lonesome Highway, which highlighted its songwriting and vocal harmonies.

In 2026, the title track "Over Again" won Best Folk/Americana Song at the International Acoustic Music Awards

== Competitions ==
- 2026 Best Folk/Americana Song at the International Acoustic Music Awards.
- 2021 Reunite in Reykjavik competition
- 2019 International Songwriting Competition Semi-finalist
- 2017 Shrewsbury Folk Festival Winners of the Open Mic Competition.
