= I Dreamt I Was a Bird =

Studio album by Lucy Ward
- Released: 2 October 2015
- Genre: Folk music; Singer-songwriter
- Label: Betty Beetroot Records — CD: BETTY01; LP: BETTY01LP
- Producer: Stu Hanna

Lucy Ward chronology
Single Flame (2013)	I Dreamt I Was a Bird (2015)	Pretty Warnings (2018)

I Dreamt I Was a Bird, the third album of British singer-songwriter Lucy Ward, was released in the United Kingdom by Betty Beetroot Records on 2 October 2015. It consists of eight original compositions by Lucy Ward and one traditional ballad – "Lord Randall". The album's title is taken from the lyrics of one of its tracks, "Daniel and the Mermaid".

== Reception ==
Professional ratings
Review scores
Source	Rating
Louder than War	9.5/10 stars
The Daily Telegraph	4/5 stars
Songwriting	4/5 stars
Northern Sky	4/5 stars

The album was critically acclaimed, receiving four-starred reviews in The Daily Telegraph, in Songwriting magazine and in Northern Sky magazine. It was awarded Album of the Year 2015 by Fatea magazine. Helen Gregory, reviewing the album for Folk Radio UK, described it as "a sterling example of all that is good about contemporary folk music in Britain today". In a review for Artree, Phil Daniels described I Dreamt I Was a Bird as "musically compelling", surpassing both her previous albums.

== Songs ==
"Lion", commissioned by Billy Bragg for the 14-18 NOW project, is about Rifleman Robert Loveless Barker, executed, aged 21, for cowardice during the First World War. He is commemorated on the Shot at Dawn Memorial at the National Memorial Arboretum in Staffordshire.

== Track listing ==
1. "Summers That We Made" (Lucy Ward), 4.00
2. "Ode to Whittaker Brown" (Lucy Ward), 4.52
3. "Creatures and Demons" (Lucy Ward), 3.29
4. "Lord Randall" (Roud 10; Child 12) (traditional, arranged by Lucy Ward), 4.32
5. "Lion" (Lucy Ward), 4.10
6. "Song for Lola" (lyrics: Lucy Ward; music: Lucy Ward and Stu Hanna), 4.39
7. "Daniel and the Mermaid" (arranged by Lucy Ward), 3.45
8. "Connie and Bud" (Lucy Ward), 4.54
9. "Return to Earth" (Lucy Ward), 2.55

== Personnel ==
- Lucy Ward – vocals, guitar, harmonium, concertina, percussion, banjo
- Anna Esslemont – violin
- Debbie Hanna – backing vocals
- Stu Hanna – guitars, piano, Mellotron, B3 organs, violin, backing vocals
- Sam Pegg – bass guitar
- Lukas Drinkwater – double bass
- Stephen MacLachlan – drums
- Brighouse and Rastrick Brass Band (on "Lion")

== Production ==
I Dreamt I Was a Bird was produced by Stu Hanna from Megson, who also performs on the album, with his wife Debbie Hanna providing backing vocals. The album was engineered by Stu Hanna and Stephen MacLachlan. The photography and album art was by Elly Lucas.
