= Dan Sealey =

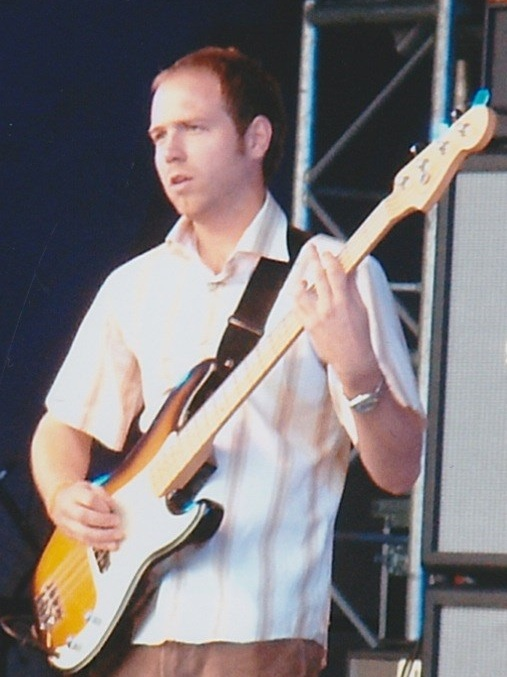
- Sealey with Ocean Colour Scene in 2004

Background information
- Born: 28 September 1976 (age 49)
- Origin: Redditch, Worcestershire, England
- Genres: Indie rock, folk rock
- Instrument(s): Bass, guitar, vocals, piano
- Years active: 1997–present

Dan Sealey (born 28 September 1976) is an English musician, best known as former bass guitarist for the rock group Ocean Colour Scene. He was drafted in by the band after Damon Minchella left the band in 2003. Sealey is also in Merrymouth, a folk band with former Ocean Colour Scene bandmate Simon Fowler and Adam Barry. Before joining Ocean Colour Scene, Sealey was a member of the band Late.

== Late ==
Prior to joining Ocean Colour Scene, Sealey was singer and rhythm guitarist in Late, a four-piece indie/rock band from Astwood Bank, Redditch, Worcestershire who were active between 1997 and 2001. The band members were:

- Dan Sealey - vocals and rhythm guitar
- Paul McCormack - lead guitar
- Greg Young - bass guitar
- Ted Atkinson - drums

In 2001, Late supported Ocean Colour Scene at a number of UK gigs in a slot which had previously been filled by Coldplay. Late were managed by Dan's father Dave Sealey, who was one half of folk/music hall duo Cosmotheka along with his brother Al Sealey. They were funded by digital start up company, Resurrection Sound Ltd - which later went on to form publishing company, Dan Sealey Music LLP. Late recorded one album, titled "All Major Routes". It is not known whether this was ever commercially released. Demo copies do exist though, with the following tracks included (all tracks written by Late unless otherwise stated)

1. "Still Go On"
2. "Easy"
3. "Driver"
4. "See My Room"
5. "The Day Will Come"
6. "Women On Top"
7. "We Could Be Wasted"
8. "Sleep" (Atkinson)
9. "Man In The Middle" (Sealey)
10. "Take Me Home"(McCormack, Sealey, Young)

"Man In The Middle" was re-recorded by Ocean Colour Scene for inclusion on the On the Leyline album. Also, footage exists of Late performing "Still Go On" on an unknown television show.

== Ocean Colour Scene ==
Sealey became involved with Birmingham band Ocean Colour Scene after the departure of original bass player and founder member Damon Minchella in late 2003. Sealey already had a loose connection to the band as his sister is married to Simon Fowler's brother. Sealey sent a speculative message Fowler, offering to fill in if necessary. Fowler accepted and offered Sealey to fill in for the April 2004 Ronnie Lane Memorial Concert at the Royal Albert Hall. Sealey joined the band full-time, continuing to play with them until leaving in 2015.

== Merrymouth ==
In 2012, Sealey and Fowler teamed up with multi-instrumentalist Mike McNamara to release a record, eventually called Simon Fowler's Merrymouth, featuring guest appearances from John McCusker and Andy Cutting. The band's second album, Wenlock Hill, was released in 2014, and featured appearances from Adam Barry, McCusker, and Chas Hodges.

Sealey has written songs for both Merrymouth albums, including "Last Train But One", "In the Midst of Summertime", "Mr Marshall", "Blink of an Eye" and "That Man".

Since Merrymouth's second album, the band was put on hiatus as Fowler went back to concentrating on OCS. Sealey then slightly amended the name to Merrymaker and continues to play their songs as a solo artist. He has also continued to write and record under that name.

== Solo work ==
Dan's debut solo album 'Beware of Darkness' was released on 15 March 2025. Tracks listed below (All songs written by Dan Sealey)

- Looking Inward
- Yesterday Came
- Better Day
- Keep on Reading
- Over The Sea
- People
- Into The Wild
- All Stand Up
- They Don't Care
- Inside My Head

== Cricket ==
Dan Sealey is a batsman and bowler for the Astwood Bank Village Cricket Club.
