= Chris Wood (folk musician) =

English songwriter, composer, and performer

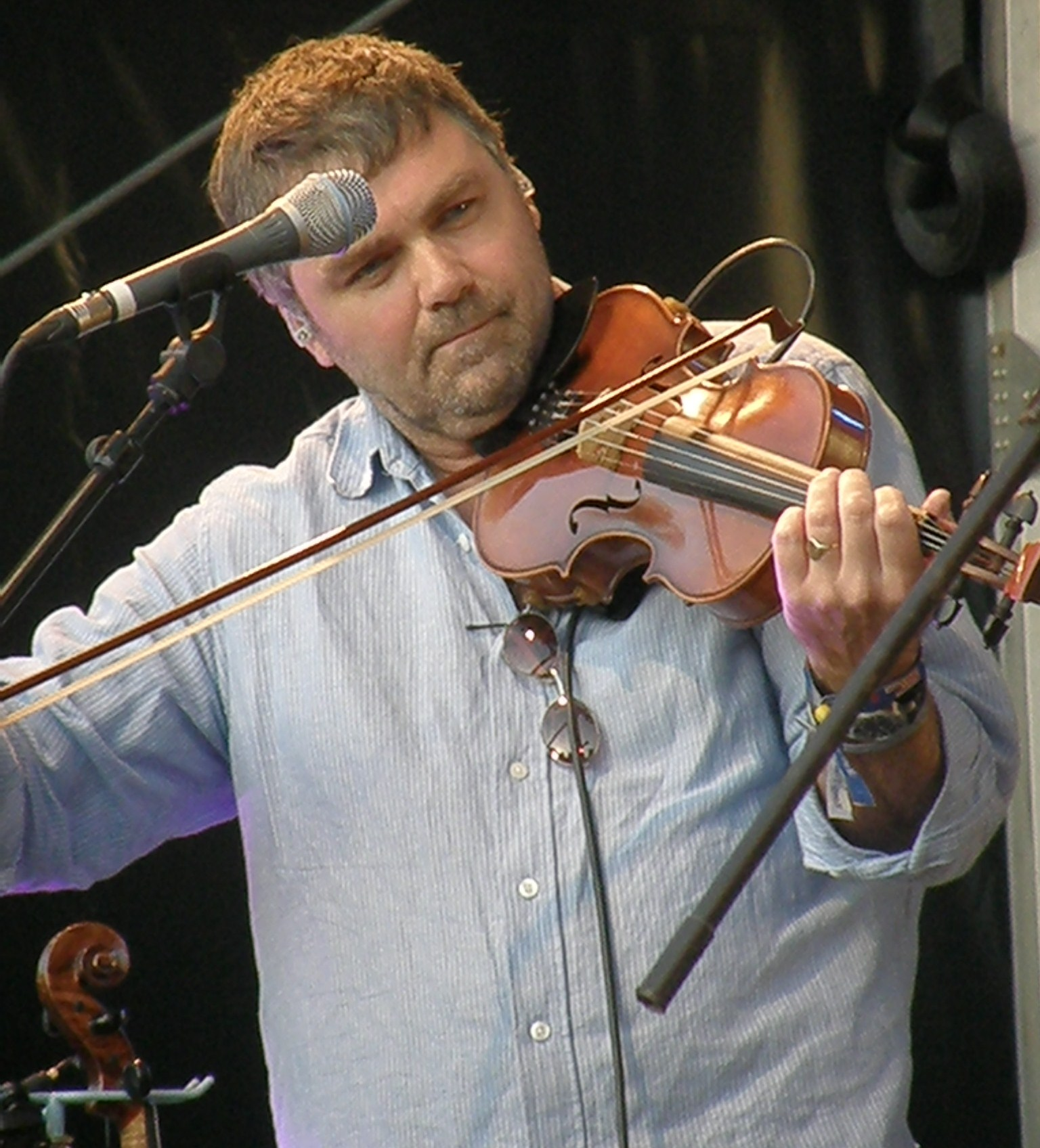
- Wood with The Imagined Village at Camp Bestival; 20 July 2008

Background information
- Genres: Folk music
- Occupations: Musician, songwriter
- Instruments: Vocals, fiddle, viola, guitar, bass guitar
- Years active: 1990–present
- Label: RUF Records

Chris Wood is an English songwriter and composer who plays fiddle, viola and guitar, and sings. He is a practitioner of traditional English dance music (with a background in English church music), including Morris and other rituals and ceremonies, but his repertoire also includes much French folk music and traditional Québécois material. He worked for many years in a duo with button accordion/melodeon player Andy Cutting: Wood & Cutting were one of the most influential acts on the English folk music scene. Q Magazine gave their "Live at Sidmouth" album four stars and put the duo "at the forefront of the latest wave of British music acts". One of his first recordings was playing bass and percussion on "Jack's Alive" (1980) the first album by the Oysterband (at that time called the Oyster Ceilidh Band).

Wood is also a member of Wood, Wilson & Carthy, with Roger Wilson and Martin Carthy. Wood & Cutting, together with piano accordionist Karen Tweed and guitarist Ian Carr, make up the Two Duos Quartet, who have made one album "Half as happy as we". With John Dipper on fiddle and Robert Harbron on concertinas, he is part of the English Acoustic Collective. This is also the name of an organisation which Wood set up in 1999 to link the many threads of his teaching activities, including summer schools based at Ruskin Mill near Nailsworth, Gloucestershire.

Other projects include "Listening to the River" (a concert project which interweaves recordings of dialect and oral history from the area around the River Medway with live music) and "Glassblower", described as "an industrial ballet".

At the BBC Radio 2 Folk Awards 2006, the Best Original Song category was won by Wood and storyteller Hugh Lupton for "One in a Million", a modern retelling of a widespread traditional tale in which a lost ring is rediscovered in the stomach of a fish. He was also nominated in three other categories: Best Album (for The Lark Descending), Best Traditional Track ("Lord Bateman"), and Folk Singer of the Year.

In 2009, the BBC Radio 2 Folk Awards recognised Wood as 'Folk Singer of the Year', and Trespasser was also recognised as Album of the Year.

In March 2009, Wood took part in the Darwin Song Project, a multi-artist songwriting retreat organised by the Shrewsbury Folk Festival to create songs that had a "resonance and relevance" to Darwin. A CD was released in August 2009.

In 2011, Wood again tasted success at the BBC Radio 2 Folk Awards, where he was recognised as Folk Singer of the Year as well as winning Song of the Year for his song "Hollow Point", from The Handmade Life, a song about the shooting of Jean Charles de Menezes in 2005.

In 2012, the singer-songwriter Joan Armatrading asked him to appear as support act on the British leg of her Starlight tour.

In 2024, he played on Alison Moyet's tenth studio album Key, appearing on the song "Filigree". The album reached number eight on the UK album charts.

== Discography ==
Unless indicated otherwise, all solo albums, issued by RUF Records; recordings include:

- Ever Simpler
- Chris Wood & Andy Cutting – (1990) RUFCD01
- The Old Hat Dance Band – (1992) Old Hat Music OH2CD
- Lisa (Wood & Cutting) – (1993) RUFCD02
- Live at Sidmouth (Wood & Cutting) – (1995) RUFCD03
- Lusignac (Wood & Cutting) – (1995) RUFCD04
- Wood, Wilson, Carthy – (1998) RUFCD05
- Crossing (with Jean-François Vrod) – (1999) RUFCD06
- Half as Happy as We (Two Duos Quartet) – (1999) RUFCD07
- Knock John (Wood & Cutting) – (1999) RUFCD08
- Ghosts (English Acoustic Collective) RUFCD09
- The Lark Descending (solo) – (2005) RUFCD10
- The Imagined Village (various artists) – (2007) Real World Records
- Trespasser (solo) – (2008) RUFCD11
- Christmas Champions (with Hugh Lupton, Robert Harbron, John Dipper, Olivia Ross) LUPTON7
- Darwin Song Project (various artists) – (2009) Shrewsbury Folk Festival SFFCD01
- The Horses (with Hugh Lupton)
- Albion: An Anthology – (2009) Navigator Records NAVIGATOR29
- The Handmade Life – (2010) RUFCD12
- None the Wiser – (2013) RUFCD13
- So Much To Defend – (2016)

== Compositions ==
His compositions include: "Coroare"; "Back at Lusignac"; "Elizabeth Clare"; "I Feel a Smile Coming On"; "Lusignac"; "Mrs Saggs"; "The North Downs Way"; "The Shouter"; "Ville de Québec"; "Hard"; "Albion: Walk This World"

He has written new words for the traditional song:

- "Hares on the Mountain"

He has written melodies for the following lyrics:

- "The Burning Babe" (poem by 16th-century Catholic mystic Robert Southwell)
- "One in a Million" (by Hugh Lupton)
- "Bleary Winter (by Hugh Lupton)
