= Darwin Song Project =

Compilation album by Various Artists
- Released: 31 August 2009 UK
- Recorded: 19 March 2009
- Venue: Theatre Severn, Shrewsbury
- Genre: Folk
- Length: 72mins, 35 seconds
- Label: Shrewsbury Folk Festival/Proper Records
- Producer: Neil Pearson, Stu Hanna

Darwin Song Project is a compilation album, released on 7 September 2009. It features folk artists from the UK and North America, who were tasked with the creation of new songs that had a "resonance and relevance to Charles Darwin". The artists gathered together for seven days in a farmhouse in Shropshire to compose the songs. The artists were: Chris Wood, Karine Polwart, Jez Lowe, Mark Erelli, Emily Smith, Rachael McShane, Krista Detor and Stu Hanna.

== History ==
The project was put together and managed by the Shrewsbury Folk Festival and was the feature of a BBC Radio 4 documentary and a feature on Mike Harding’s BBC Radio 2 show.

On 13 March 2009 eight artists gathered together at Henley Farmhouse in rural Shropshire for a week-long songwriting retreat, to create new works that related to Darwin – who was born in Shrewsbury in 1809. The eight artists covered a wide range of songwriting experience and styles, from some of the most celebrated writers in the UK through to artists who were relatively unknown in the UK. The newly formed ‘group’ performed these new songs to a sold out audience at the brand new Theatre Severn in Shrewsbury on 19 March, at the end of the songwriting week. The CD captures 17 of the songs performed on the night, and features all eight artists in both lead and supporting roles, culminating in Woods’ ensemble piece.

19 songs were written and performed at the original concert, a Chopin piece and reading from Randal Keynes book Annie's Box was performed by Wood & Detor, and a final encore 'The Darwin Walk' written by Lowe was performed where each artist wrote and sang a verse of an ensemble piece. These are missing from the CD due to space limitations.

The group performed the songs again at the Shrewsbury Folk Festival on 29 August 2009, the Chopin piece was not played, but the 'Darwin Walk' was.

There is a DVD release of the initial concert with the fully mixed sound from the CD, the DVD includes the Chopin piece and 'The Darwin Walk' as well as extended song introductions. The DVD was never made commercially available and was only ever available at the 2009 Shrewsbury Folk Festival.

The album was mixed by Stu Hanna, and the overall project directed by Neil Pearson of the Shrewsbury Folk Festival

== Reception ==
Professional ratings
Review scores
Source	Rating
The Guardian	4/5 stars

The project has been reviewed favorably. The Guardian called it "an intriguing, impressive album that results from a brave and unlikely collaboration." According to NetRhythms, "[The Project] displays a spirit of genuine artistic collaboration between the contributors."

== Track listing ==
1. "Trust in the Rolling Ocean"
2. "Heavy in My Hand"
3. "Turtle Soup"
4. "Kingdom Come"
5. "The Merchant’s Question"
6. "Thinking Path"
7. "Jemmy Button"
8. "From Miss Emma Brawley"
9. "The Earl of Darwin’s Farewell / Save A Place"
10. "Emma’s Lullaby"
11. "We’re All Leaving"
12. "Mother of Mysteries"
13. "Will You be Waiting?"
14. "Mother of My Soul"
15. "Clock of the World"
16. "We’ll Hunt Him Down"
17. "You May Stand Mute"
