= Ridgeway Secondary School =

Coordinates: 52.25248°N 1.93747°W

Location
- Evesham Road; Astwood Bank; Redditch, Worcestershire, B96 6BD; England

Information
- Type: Academy
- Established: 1959
- Local authority: Worcestershire
- Trust: Shires Multi Academy Trust
- Department for Education URN: 149437 Tables
- Ofsted: Reports
- Headteacher: Matt Ball
- Gender: Coeducational
- Age: 11 to 16
- Website: https://ridgewaysecondary.org.uk/

Ridgeway Secondary School is a coeducational secondary school located in Astwood Bank (near Redditch) in the English county of Worcestershire.

Established in 1959, it was a middle school for many years, known as Ridgeway Middle School. In December 2012 the school converted to academy status and was renamed Ridgeway Academy. In 2016 the school expanded its age range to admit pupils from the age 11, thereby becoming a secondary school. The school was then renamed Ridgeway Secondary School in September 2020.

Ridgeway Secondary School offers GCSEs and BTECs as programmes of study for pupils, as well as the European Computer Driving Licence and the ASDAN CoPE course.
