= Krista Detor =

American singer-songwriter

- Origin: Bloomington, Indiana, United States
- Genre: Adult contemporary
- Occupations: Singer, songwriter, pianist
- Instrument: Piano
- Website: www.kristadetor.com

Krista Detor is a singer-songwriter and pianist from Bloomington, Indiana whose music has been featured on NPR and with Mike Harding on the BBC.

== Musical career ==
Her second album, Mudshow, established Krista Detor on the world stage. Working with partner and producer, David Weber, she released the follow-up album, Cover Their Eyes, in 2007. She has reached No. 1 on the Euro-Americana chart, and her music has been featured at the Cannes Film Festival, on NPR, PBS, the BBC, and on many U.S. and European national, regional, and local radio shows. She has appeared on both U.S. and European television and collaborated on the CD and stage show Wilderness Plots.

In March 2009, she was chosen to be a part of the Darwin Songhouse, with seven other songwriters in Shrewsbury, England, writing for seven days songs to celebrate the 200th anniversary of the birth of Charles Darwin in his hometown. The event, subsequent concert, and live CD release were covered extensively by the BBC.

Krista Detor released her fourth album, Chocolate Paper Suites, in March 2010, followed by a tour throughout northern Europe and the United Kingdom. The album consists of a series of five three-song suites, each connected by theme and/or imagery, inspired by the works of Federico García Lorca, Dylan Thomas, and Darwin, among other thinkers, artists and experiences.

Touring the U.S. and Europe consistently, Detor has shared stages with Joan Armatrading, Suzanne Vega, Aaron Neville, Loudon Wainwright, Sam Phillips, Colin Linden, Karine Polwart, Rachael McShane, Emily Smith, Chris Wood, Luka Bloom, Slaid Cleaves, Peter Mulvey, The Wailing Jennys, Jakob Dylan, Jez Lowe, Carrie Newcomer, Lucy Kaplansky, and John Gorka, among others, and travels with her partner and producer, David Weber.

Detor's solo albums have reached national and international prominence, including number one on the Euro-AmericanaChart, and placement within the top 10 of the U.S. Folk and Independent Music charts. She has performed with artists Suzanne Vega, Joan Armatrading, The Neville Brothers, Loudon Wainwright, Sam Phillips, and John Gorka, among others. Her choral works have been commissioned by the Ashland Women's Choir, the Shrewsbury Community Choir, the Cincinnati Women's Choir, and others. Krista continues to tour the U.S., Canada and Northern Europe, as a songwriter, performer, and seeker of inspiration wherever and whenever she can find it.

Detor has worked with Carrie Newcomer and Tim Grimm on the collaborative stage show and CD Wilderness Plots, which is based on the book of the same name by Scott Sanders.

She now tours the U.S. and Europe consistently and performed in the Darwin Song Project at the Shrewsbury Folk Festival in 2009 as part of Charles Darwin's 200th birthday celebration.

== Critical acclaim ==
Of Detor's work, MusicDish magazine states: "Call Mudshow a novel like Richard Wright's Manchild in the Promised Land or the musical equivalent of Akira Kurosawa’s Dreams: a collection of short pieces – stories or short films of dreams – that taken together, form a whole, more than the sum of its parts." The Boston Herald says simply, "All singer-songwriters should be this good."

== Discography ==
- A Dream in a Cornfield (2004)
- Mudshow (2006)
- Cover Their Eyes (2007)
- Robert Johnson Has Left Mississippi (2008) (EP)
- The Silver Wood: Wintersongs (2008)
- Chocolate Paper Suites (2010)
- Flat Earth Diary (2013)
- Barely (2015)
- Chaos, Collisions and Clocks (2019)
