= Bobby Crespino =

American football player (1938–2013)

No. 42, 89
- Positions: Split end, tight end

Personal information
- Born: January 11, 1938; Duncan, Mississippi, U.S.
- Died: July 29, 2013 (aged 75); Atlanta, Georgia, U.S.
- Listed height: 6 ft 5 in (1.96 m)
- Listed weight: 225 lb (102 kg)

Career information
- High school: Greenville (Greenville, Mississippi)
- College: Ole Miss
- NFL draft: 1961: 1st round, 10th overall pick
- AFL draft: 1961: 6th round, 45th overall pick

Career history
- Cleveland Browns (1961–1963); New York Giants (1964–1968); Los Angeles Rams (1969)*
- * Offseason or practice squad member only

Awards and highlights
- National champion (1960)

Career NFL statistics
- Receptions: 58
- Receiving yards: 741
- Touchdowns: 9
- Stats at Pro Football Reference

Robert C. Crespino (January 11, 1938 – July 29, 2013) was an American professional football tight end who played in the National Football League (NFL) for the Cleveland Browns and New York Giants. Born in Duncan, Mississippi, he played college football at the University of Mississippi and was drafted by the Browns in the first round (tenth overall) of the 1961 NFL draft. Crespino was also selected in the sixth round of the 1961 AFL draft by the Oakland Raiders. He was the father of political historian, Joseph Crespino. Crespino died on July 29, 2013, in Atlanta, Georgia following a long undisclosed illness.
