= Joseph Crespino =

American historian

- Born: January 10, 1972 (age 54)
- Education: Northwestern University; University of Mississippi; Stanford University
- Occupation: Historian
- Employer: Emory University
- Spouse: Caroline Herring
- Parent: Bobby Crespino (father)

Joseph Crespino (born January 10, 1972) is a political historian of the 20th-century United States, specializing in the history of the American South and of modern conservatism. He is the author of two books and an edited collection.

== Early life and education ==
Crespino was raised in Macon, Mississippi. His father, Bobby Crespino, played football at the University of Mississippi and then later in the NFL. Crespino attended Central Academy in Macon from 1977 to 1985, The McCallie School in Chattanooga, Tennessee, from 1986 to 1990, and Northwestern University (1990–1994), where he earned a bachelor of arts degree. He earned an MEd from the University of Mississippi in 1996, and a PhD from Stanford University in 2002.

== Career ==
From 1994 to 1996, Crespino was a member of the Mississippi Teacher Corps, where he taught 11th-grade American history at Gentry High School in Indianola, Mississippi.

Crespino is a professor of history at Emory University in Atlanta, where he holds the Jimmy Carter Chair in American History. He received the Undergraduate Teaching Award from the Emory Center for Teaching and Curricular Excellence in 2009.

He has been named a Top Young Historian by the History News Network at George Mason University.

== Personal life ==
His wife is Mississippi-born singer-songwriter Caroline Herring.

== Works ==
Crespino is the author of Strom Thurmond’s America (Hill and Wang, 2012), a political biography of the longtime U.S. Senator from South Carolina. The book received positive reviews from Doris Kearns Goodwin and Publishers Weekly.

His other book, In Search of Another Country: Mississippi and the Conservative Counterrevolution (Princeton, 2007), won the 2008 Lillian Smith Book Award by the Southern Regional Council, the McLemore Prize for the Best Mississippi History Book, and the nonfiction prize given by the Mississippi Institute of Arts and Letters. He also co-edited with Matthew Lassiter a book of essays titled The Myth of Southern Exceptionalism (Oxford, 2010).

In 2018 he published a book on Atticus Finch, a main character in the Pulitzer Prize-winning novel To Kill a Mockingbird by Harper Lee.

== Bibliography ==
- In Search of Another Country: Mississippi and the Conservative Counterrevolution Princeton, New Jersey: Princeton University Press, 2007. ISBN 9780691140940, OCLC 999775311
- Strom Thurmond's America, New York: Hill and Wang, 2013. ISBN 9780809084340, OCLC 875623047
- Atticus Finch: The Biography, New York: Basic Books, 2018. ISBN 9781541644946, OCLC 1013526850

=== Editor ===
- Matthew D. Lassiter and Joseph Crespino, The Myth of Southern Exceptionalism, New York: Oxford University Press, 2010. ISBN 9780195384758, OCLC 768084060

== External lists ==
- Appearances on C-SPAN
