= Megson (surname) =

Megson is a surname. Notable people with the surname include:

- Don Megson (1936–2023), English former footballer and manager
- Gary Megson (born 1959), English former footballer and manager, son of Don Megson
- Neil Megson (soccer) (born 1962), British/American soccer player, also a son of Don Megson
- Genesis P-Orridge, real name Neil Andrew Megson, English singer-songwriter and musician

== See also ==
- Megson (disambiguation)
