= Lucy Ward (musician) =

English folk singer-songwriter

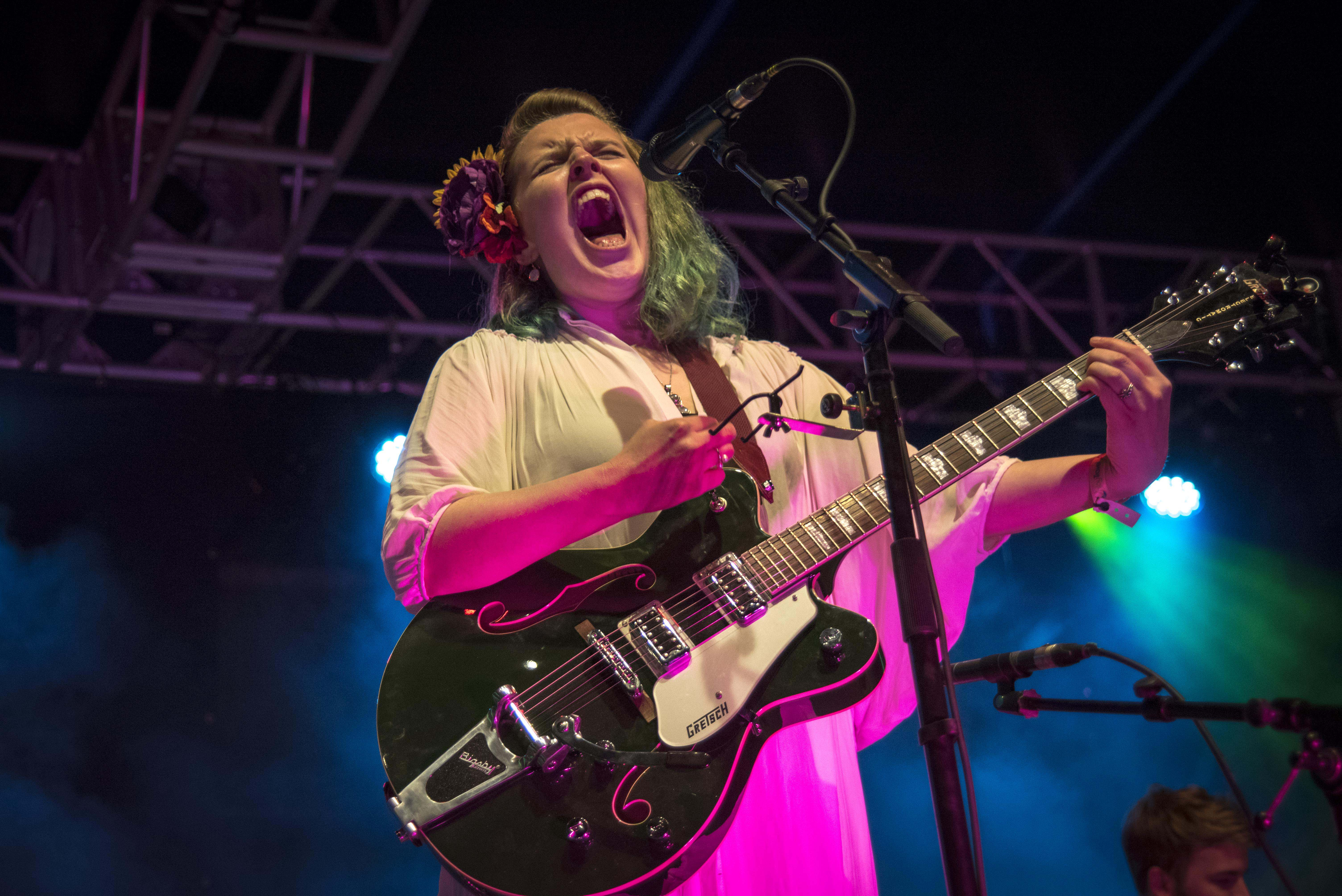
- Lucy Ward at the Costa del Folk festival in Mallorca in 2016

Background information
- Born: Derby, Derbyshire, England
- Genres: Folk, singer-songwriter
- Instruments: vocals, guitar, harmonium, concertina, percussion, banjo
- Labels: Navigator Records; Betty Beetroot
- Formerly of: Cupola:Ward, Cupola
- Website: www.lucywardsings.com

Lucy Victoria Ward is an English singer-songwriter from Derby, England. She performs, with a voice described as expressive and powerful, (Note: "Ward has an expressive, powerful voice. She also has an outsize personality, like a latter-day Judy Henske, and a well honed ability to work an audience." Paul Rhodes (8 March 2011). "Review: Idgy Vaughn, House Concert (Near York)". The Press (York).) traditional English folk songs as well as her own material. Three of her albums, Adelphi Has to Fly, Single Flame and I Dreamt I Was a Bird, have been critically acclaimed and have each received four-starred reviews in the British national press.

== Early life and education ==
The youngest of six children, Lucy Ward grew up in Littleover, Derbyshire. She went to St Peter's Junior School in Littleover, and Littleover Community School. She started playing guitar and wrote her first song at the age of 14, and soon afterwards performed live for the first time. After performing at open mic nights across the Midlands she put her name forward for the BBC Young Folk Awards at the age of 18, and two years later signed a contract with Navigator Records.

== Professional career ==
=== Adelphi Has to Fly ===
On Adelphi Has to Fly, which is produced by Stu Hanna from Megson, Lucy Ward is accompanied by Sam Pegg, Belinda O'Hooley and Heidi Tidow from O'Hooley & Tidow and by Debbie and Stu Hanna.

The songs on the album include: "Stitch in Time" by Mike Waterson; "Maids When You're Young", a traditional song which was popularised by The Dubliners; Child ballad "The Two Sisters"; and "Death (Rock Me to Sleep)", based on a poem said to have been written by Anne Boleyn, (Note: Sources differ on whether George or Anne Boleyn wrote "O Death Rock Me Asleep" but the consensus is that Anne wrote it – see Fatal conspiracies: O Death Rock Me Asleep (Me and Mine website about the life and times of Anne Boleyn).) set to a tune by Lucy Ward. "Alice in the Bacon Box", a song written by Ward in the style of a traditional folk song, tells the story of Derbyshire hermit Alice Grace (1867–1927) from Little Eaton who, on being evicted from her cottage, lived in a box previously used for storing bacon, which had been given to her by the local butcher.

The album was critically acclaimed and received a four-starred review in The Guardian.

=== Single Flame ===
On 7 August 2013, in a concert at St Pancras Old Church, London, she launched her second album, Single Flame. Produced by Stu Hanna, it was released by Navigator Records on 19 August 2013. The album includes "For the Dead Men", a self-penned protest song, which was released as a single in January 2012 coupled with a remixed version of "Maids When You’re Young". This was again produced by Stu Hanna, who also performs on the two tracks, with his wife Debbie Hanna providing backing vocals.

In a four-starred review for The Guardian, Robin Denselow said that Lucy Ward "proves to be an even more mature and thoughtful singer-songwriter than she was on Adelphi Has to Fly" and described her follow-up album as "impressive and original" and "a brooding, often angry set that deals with everything from politics to love, death and personal tragedy, with a couple of powerful traditional songs added in".

=== I Dreamt I Was a Bird ===
Ward's third album, I Dreamt I Was a Bird, was released by Betty Beetroot Records on 2 October 2015. It received a four-starred review in The Daily Telegraph and was awarded Album of the Year 2015 by Fatea magazine.

=== Pretty Warnings ===
Ward's fourth album, Pretty Warnings, was released by Betty Beetroot Records on 15 June 2018. David Pratt, reviewing the album for Folk Radio UK, described it as "a mesmerising, exquisite album which succeeds in mixing sometimes delicate, always thoughtful, image-laden originals with fresh, innovative re-workings of songs from the traditional folk canon".

=== Other work ===
==== Film, television and radio ====
Ward's music has been used as the soundtrack for award-winning director Kim Hopkins' documentary film Folie à Deux – madness made of two. The film soundtrack uses "For the Dead Men", some new original material and some cover songs played by Lucy Ward and Hungarian fiddle player Barnabas Balázs. The film, which shows the human cost of the 2008 financial crisis, premiered in November 2012 at the International Documentary Film Festival Amsterdam and was broadcast on BBC Four in its Storyville international documentary series on 11 November 2013.

Lucy Ward was commissioned by BBC Radio 3's The Verb to write a song based on Elizabeth Gaskell's novel North and South. Her live performance of her new song "Creatures and Demons" was included in a special programme on Mrs Gaskell, broadcast on 3 October 2014.

==== Musical theatre ====
Ward has also written songs and music for Robin Hood by the touring theatre company Oddsocks. It was announced in 2018 that Ward had been working alongside critically acclaimed choreographer, Deborah Norris to form the production company Henwives Tales. The company focuses on combining folk music and ballet/ dance productions for a variety of venues and events. Their debut production called The Sisters of Elva Hill is based upon the traditional folk tale The Two Princesses and has been branded a "folk ballet". An album of the music was released in 2019.

==== Other recordings ====
Ward has performed and recorded with the Cupola trio (Doug Eunson, Sarah Matthews and Oli Matthews) as Cupola:Ward, releasing in 2012 the EP Four and, in 2016, a debut album, Bluebell.

Ward provided vocals on one of the tracks – "Gospel of the Sun" – on David Gibb's 2011 album There Are Birds in My Garden and on a track – "There's a Dragon in My Bedroom" – on Gibb's 2014 album Letters Through Your Door. She also provided backing vocals on three of the tracks on Marc Block's album The Hawthorn Spring, released on 15 April 2014. Her vocals also appear on the 2015 Mills and Chimneys album The Common Thread.

== Awards and recognition ==
Ward was a Young Folk Award finalist in the 2009 BBC Radio 2 Folk Awards where she performed "Stitch in Time" by Mike Waterson. The song was included on the third CD of the album BBC Radio 2 Folk Awards 2009 and a longer recording appeared on her 2011 album Adelphi Has to Fly.

In the 2012 BBC Radio 2 Folk Awards she won the Horizon award (for best newcomer). Her recording of "Maids When You’re Young", which was subsequently included on the first CD of the album BBC Radio 2 Folk Awards 2012, was nominated as best traditional track.

In 2014, she was nominated for the "Folk Singer of the Year" award at the BBC Radio 2 Folk Awards. Her recording, from Single Flame, of the Roud 1302 song "Marching Through the Green Grass", was included on the album BBC Radio 2 Folk Awards 2014.

== Discography ==
=== Lucy Ward ===
Album	Release date	Label
Adelphi Has to Fly	13 June 2011	Navigator Records (Navigator 47)
Single Flame	19 August 2013	Navigator Records (Navigator 083)
I Dreamt I Was a Bird	2 October 2015	Betty Beetroot Records (BETTY01)
Pretty Warnings	15 June 2018	Betty Beetroot Records (BETTY03)

Single	Release date	Label
"For the Dead Men" (Lucy Ward) / "Maids When You're Young" (remix) (traditional, arranged Lucy Ward)	29 January 2012	Navigator Records (Navigator 070)

=== Cupola:Ward ===
EP	Tracks	Release date	Label
Four	"Cotton Mills of Cromford" (traditional) / "The Bone Lace Weaver" (Leonard Wheatcroft, Roy Harris) / "When God Dips His Pen of Love in My Heart" (Alison Krauss) / "King of Rome" (David Sudbury)	2012	Coth Records

Album	Release date	Label
Bluebell	18 June 2016	Betty Beetroot Records (BETTY02)

=== The Henwives Tales ===
Album	Release date	Label
The Sisters of Elva Hill	9 July 2019	Betty Beetroot Records (BETTY03)

=== With James Findlay, Bella Hardy and Brian Peters ===
Album	Release date	Label
The Liberty to Choose: A Selection of Songs from The New Penguin Book of English Folk Songs	10 June 2013	Fellside Recordings(FECD257)

=== Various artists ===
Album	Release date	Label	Notes
Land of Hope and Fury: a compilation of contemporary protest songs	10 July 2015	Union Music Store	Lucy Ward performs one track: "Bigger Than That"
Shine On – an album of songs by John Lennon	9 October 2015	Independent	Lucy Ward performs one track: "Working Class Hero"

== Personal life ==
Lucy Ward lived in Mickleover, Derbyshire as of 2014. She has a black belt at tae kwon-do and has taught martial arts.
