= Calan (band) =

Welsh band

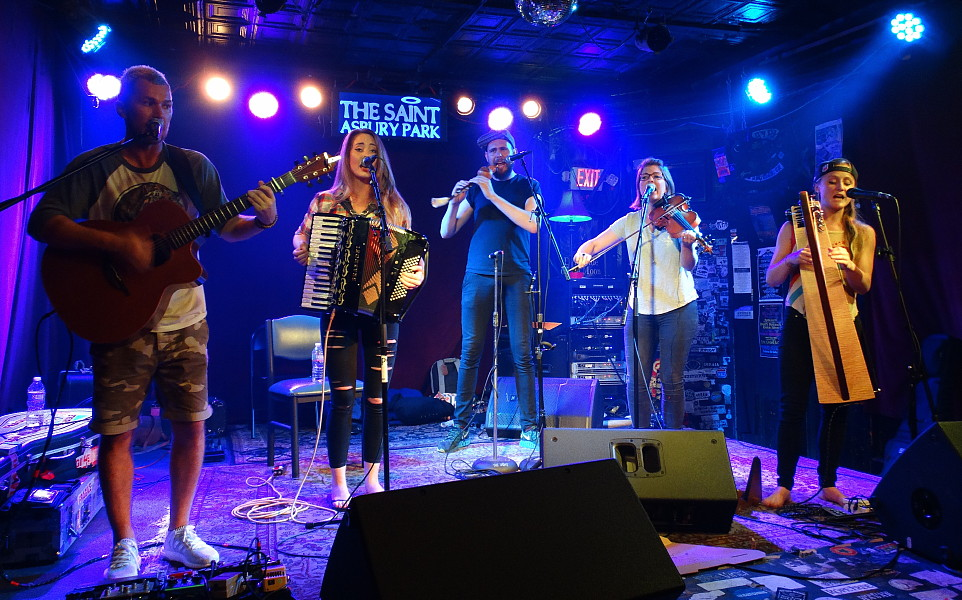
- Calan performing at The Saint in Asbury Park, NJ

Background information
- Origin: Wales
- Genres: Welsh folk music, Folk music, Folk rock, Alternative folk music
- Years active: 2006–present
- Members: Angharad Sian – fiddle Bethan Rhiannon – accordion, piano, vocals, step dancer Sam Humphreys – guitar Shelley Musker Turner – harp Patrick Rimes – fiddle, pibgorn, whistle
- Past members: Chris 'Cai' Ab Alun – guitar Alaw Ebrill Jones; Llinos Eleri Jones – harp Alice French - harp

Calan (meaning "Calend" (being the start of a month, or year) in Welsh) is a five-piece revivalist traditional Welsh band formed by their manager Huw Williams in early 2006 when its members were only 13 to 22 years old. In 2008, they created great excitement at the Inter Celtic Festival where they would eventually be the first Welsh band to win the coveted international band competition.

== Background ==
The inspiration for the band's name dates back to their early days as street musicians when someone happened to photograph them in front of a sign for a construction company called "Calan," which is term that means the beginning of something new or a fresh start. Calan is considered a "M4 corridor band." Its members, who are from Cardiff, Swansea, and Cwmbran, met each other through the region's music scene. They played together on a monthly basis, and kept in touch even after they all went off to university, eventually coming back together to form the band.

After their debut album Bling in 2008, Calan played at progressively more impressive venues, including the Cambridge Festival, Glasgow's Celtic Connections, Shrewsbury Folk Festival, the Whitby Folk Festival. They have toured in the US, Canada, Belgium, Italy, and France. They were invited to perform alongside Bryn Terfel and Sting at the Royal Albert Hall, London as part of Bryn Terfel's 50th birthday party.

Calan performs traditional Welsh music, and band members see themselves as ambassadors for the traditional Welsh sound, helping to raise the international profile of traditional Welsh music. Calan's contemporary and lively approach has been credited with bringing a "fresh and vibrant sound to traditional Welsh music." They merge "sparkling melodies" and Welsh step dancing into "spirited and energetic performances." For instance, a Tale of Two Dragons is based on an old Welsh folktale about two dragons who slept at the bottom of a secret lake in the North Wales mountains during the fifth century. The dragons' nighttime fights were thought to be the cause of earthquakes. The song, which combines traditional Welsh melodies and instruments with modern guitar rhythms, breathes fire into the old folk tale.

During their performances, Calan sings in both Welsh and English. Rimes says, "We believe music travels, which is why we make the effort to sing bilingually, keeping the old Welsh songs alive and singing in English to be more accessible." "From the beginning, we made it our mission statement that we wanted to preserve Welsh music for those who might not otherwise hear it: Welsh is a very poetic language and people appreciate that over being able to understand every word." Their fourth album, Solomon (Sain Records), is a collection of songs based on Celtic Wales folklore, sung in both English and the band's native Welsh.

In 2015 some US tour gigs were cancelled when two band members were refused entry into the country in Chicago. Other gigs were held when friends were able to replace the deported band members. When Patrick Rimes (fiddle) and Sam Humphreys (guitar) were sent back to London, their record label, Sain, generously offered to pay for their return tickets.

Humphreys reported that neither had a criminal record and both had the correct working visas, but that wasn't printed on the passports due to a computer glitch at the London embassy. After spending the night in a jail cell, they were driven "straight across the runway to the plane to be deported, so we took a picture of ourselves in the [police] van as it was too good an opportunity to miss." The picture of them in a police van looking groggy-eyed from their night in jail was posted with a story on Wales Online and inspired the song "Deportation Selfie."

== Band members ==
- Angharad Sian – fiddle
- Bethan Rhiannon – accordion, piano, vocals, step dancer
- Sam Humphreys – guitar
- Shelley Musker-Turner - harp
- Patrick Rimes – fiddle, pibgorn, whistle, bagpipes
Band members on stage at The Saint in Asbury Park, NJ, USA (2017)

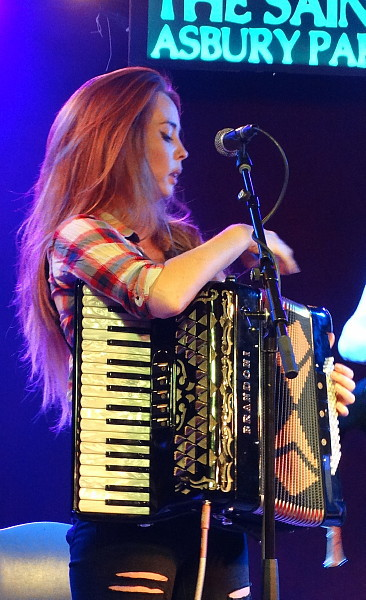
Bethan Riannon

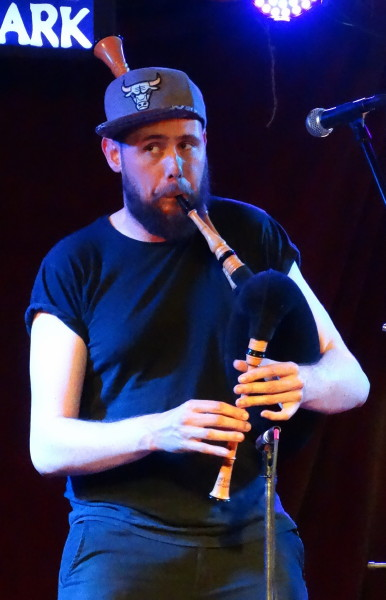
Patrick Rimes

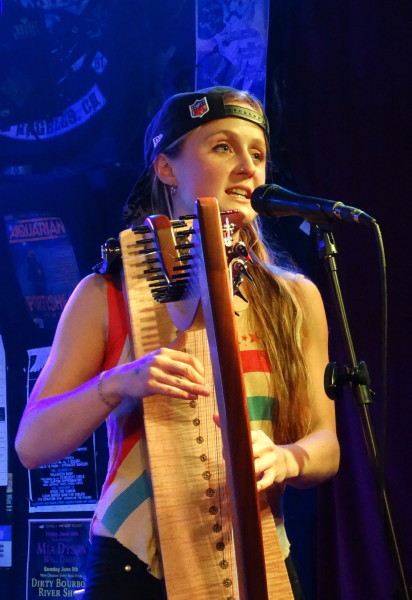
Alice French

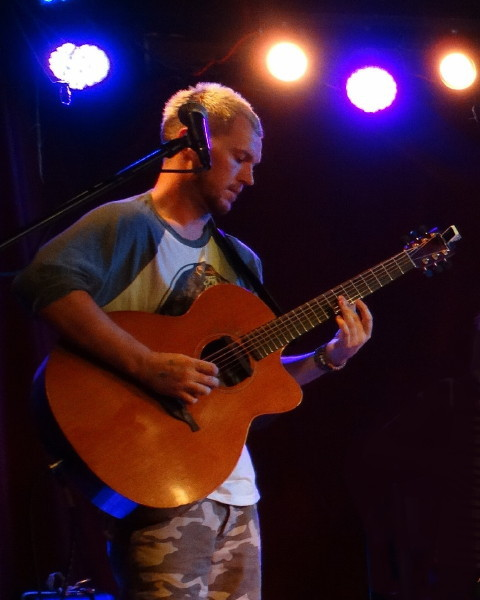
Sam Humphreys

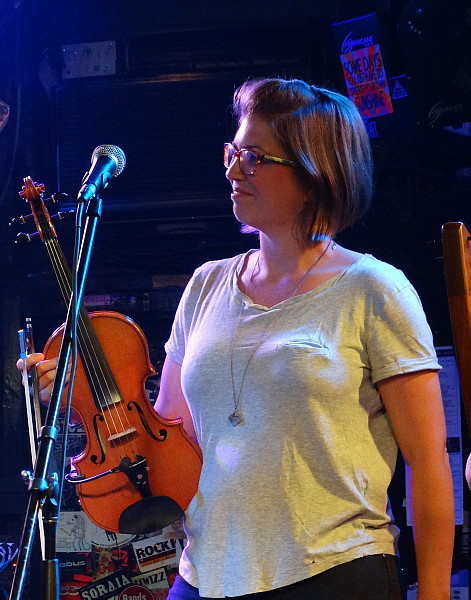
Angharad Sian

=== Previous members ===
- Chris 'Cai' Ab Alun – guitar
- Alice French – harp
- Alaw Ebrill Jones
- Meinir Siencyn
- Llinos Eleri Jones – harp

== Reviews ==
Nigel Gould of the Belfast Telegraph wrote,

"The dynamic quintet's debut album, Bling, has everything you could want from a record – stunning use of instrumentation, gorgeously crafted songs, sprightly foot-tappers, verve and raw excitement."

Gavin Martin of the Daily Mirror wrote,

"...there's nowt as dear as folk – especially when played with the grace, daring and sheer joy this multi- instrumental five-piece bring to a winning selection of reels, jigs and hornpipes. Shake a leg. In fact, shake several."

== Performances ==
Calan played their first performance at Sesiwn Fawr Dolgellau in 2008. Since then they have played major festivals in the UK including Cambridge, Shrewsbury and Fairport's Cropredy Convention. They have toured in Italy, Belgium and France.

Calan has been described as bringing a fresh and vibrant sound to traditional Welsh music, and their performances include Welsh step dancing, reels, jigs and hornpipes.

== Media appearances ==
- S4C television: Noson Lawen, Nodyn, Sioe Celf, Uned 5, Yn Fyw o Acapela
- Radio stations: BBC Radio 2, BBC Radio Wales, BBC Radio 3

== Discography ==
Release date	Title	Record label	Format	Cover image
2008	Bling	Sain	Album	
2012	Jonah	Sain	Album	
2013	Giggly	Sain	EP	
2015	Dinas	Sain	Album	
2015	Tale of Two Dragons	Sain	Single	
2017	Solomon	Sain	Album	
2018	Deg | 10	Sain	Album	
2020	kistvaen	SIENCO Records	Album	
