= Caroline Herring =

American singer-songwriter

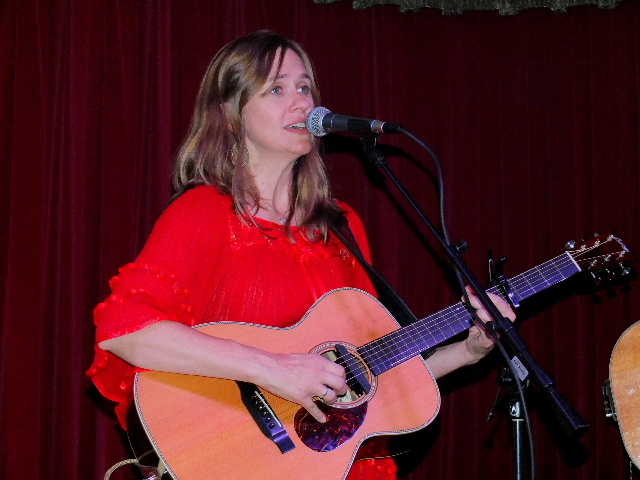
- Caroline Herring in 2012

Background information
- Born: December 10, 1969 (age 56); Canton, Mississippi, U.S.
- Origin: Austin, Texas, U.S.
- Genres: Folk, country
- Occupation: Singer-songwriter
- Instrument: Guitar
- Years active: 2000–present
- Labels: Signature Sounds, Blue Corn Music
- Website: Carolineherring.com

Caroline Herring (born December 10, 1969 in Canton, Mississippi) is an American folk and country singer, songwriter and musician. She started singing professionally when she was a graduate student at the Center for the Study of Southern Culture at the University of Mississippi. While there she co-founded Thacker Mountain Radio, a literary and musical hour broadcast from Square Books in Oxford, Mississippi, and still syndicated on Mississippi Public Radio. Herring began her solo career when she moved to Austin, Texas, in 1999.

== Career ==
Herring has released six commercial albums, starting with her 2001 debut Twilight, which earned her 2001–2002 Best New Artist award at the SXSW Austin Music Awards. The Austin American-Statesman named Twilight one of the top five albums of 2001. In 2012 Texas Music magazine named Twilight in its Top 50 Essential Texas Albums list. Her 2003 album Wellspring was named one of the top ten albums of 2005 by The Austin Chronicle. Wellspring includes the song "Mistress", which The Atlanta Journal-Constitution listed as one of the Top 100 Songs About the South. Texas Music magazine included "Mistress" in its 2012 listing of the Top 50 Classic Texas Songs in recorded history.

National Public Radio named Herring's 2008 Lantana, on Signature Sounds Recordings, as one of the Top Ten Best Folk Albums of 2008. In 2009, Herring released Golden Apples of the Sun, also on Signature Sounds, which The Boston Globe named as one of the Top 10 Best Folk Albums of 2009. In 2011, Herring was the only American chosen to participate in The Cecil Sharp Project, an eight-artist collaboration celebrating the life and work of English folk song collector Cecil Sharp. The group released a live CD, which received enthusiastic reviews and was among the Top 10 Best Albums of 2011 according to the UK music magazine Songlines. In 2011, Herring also released her first children's album, The Little House Songs, based on the 1941 book The Little House by Virginia Lee Burton. For this album, Herring received the 2012 Coleen Salley Storytelling Award at the Fay Kaigler Children's Book Festival at the University of Southern Mississippi.

In 2012, Herring released Camilla, on Signature Sounds Recordings. Mary Chapin Carpenter sings on Camilla and calls Herring "an artist who is fearless and uncompromising in her work. As a witness, a historian, a truth teller, a gypsy, a mother, a sister, and a lover, Herring takes the listener on a journey with her head and her heart ... and there is no more enlightening experience one could have."

Herring has appeared on NPR's All Things Considered and Garrison Keillor's A Prairie Home Companion, as well as the BBC's 4's Front Row. She has played at the Newport Folk Festival, Merlefest, Austin City Limits Music Festival, Bumbershoot, Old Settler's Music Festival, Strawberry Music Festival, Denmark's Tonder festival, The Netherlands’ Blue Highways festival, Ireland's Kilkenney Rhythm and Roots Festival, and the Shrewsbury Folk Festival & Beautiful Days festivals in the UK.

== Musical style ==
Herring is best known for her historical story songs, based on such various characters as a 19th-century slave named Rachel and her lover, Columbus Patton ("Mistress"'); child murderer Susan Smith ("Paper Gown"); American painter Walter Inglis Anderson ("Tales of the Islander"); Mae Frances Moultrie, one of the 1961 Freedom Riders ("White Dress"); Jeremy Davidson, a child killed during an Appalachian mountaintop removal mining incident ("Black Mountain Lullaby"); and Marion King, who suffered a miscarriage after being beaten by deputy sheriff in Georgia during the Albany Movement ("Camilla").

== Personal life ==
Herring lives in Decatur, Georgia with her husband, American political historian Joseph Crespino, and two children.

== Awards ==
- Colleen Salley Storytelling Award for The Little House Songs at the Fay Kaigler Children's Book Festival (2012)
- Mississippi Institute of Arts and Letters Award, Music Composition (Contemporary/Popular) for Golden Apples of the Sun for 2010

== Discography ==
- Twilight (2001) – Blue Corn Music
- Wellspring (2003) – Blue Corn Music
- Lantana (2008) – Signature Sounds Recordings
- Golden Apples of the Sun (2009) – Signature Sounds Recordings
- Silver Apples of the Moon [EP] (2009) – Signature Sounds Recordings
- The Little House Songs (2011) – Zelleria Records
- Camilla (2012) – Signature Sounds Recordings
- Verse by Verse (2018) – Zelleria Records
- Verses (2019) – Continental Song City

=== Other contributions ===
- Hidden People – Kathryn Roberts & Sean Lakeman, Navigator Records UK (2012) – "The White Hind" and "Huldra"
- The Cecil Sharp Project – The Shrewsbury Folk Festival and EFDSS (2011)
- Just One More: A Musical Tribute to Larry Brown, Bloodshot Records (2007) – “Song For Fay”
- Live at St. Andrews (2005) – with Claire Holley
- 107.1 KGSR Radio Austin - Broadcasts Vol. 10 (2002) – "Whipporwill"
