= Simon Fowler's Merrymouth =

Studio album by Merrymouth
- Released: 26 March 2012
- Studio: Gospel Oak Studio, Warwickshire, UK
- Genre: Folk rock
- Label: PledgeMusic
- Producer: Dan Sealey & Mike McNamara

Merrymouth chronology
Simon Fowler's Merrymouth (2012)	Wenlock Hill (2014)

Simon Fowler's Merrymouth is the debut solo album by Simon Fowler (the singer/songwriter from Ocean Colour Scene) it contains six original Fowler compositions, one of those ("Over My Head") being an OCS re-working. Released on 26 March 2012, it features Fowler (vocals and acoustic guitar), Dan Sealey (vocals and guitars), Mike McNamara (double and electric fretless basses, piano, organ, percussion and guitar), John McCusker (violins, cittern and low whistle) and Andy Cutting (melodeon).

All songs are written by Simon Fowler, unless otherwise stated. The album contains a Bert Jansch song, "Courting Blues", and the lyrics of a W. B. Yeats poem "The Stolen Child", put to a melody written by Fowler and music by Merrymouth.

Produced by Dan Sealey and Mike McNamara. Recorded at Gospel Oak Studio, Warwickshire, England by Barry 'Baz' Bayliss. Engineered by Bayliss and Alfie Manders

Professional ratings
Review scores
Source	Rating
Mr Scott Music	5/5

== Track listing ==
All tracks composed by Simon Fowler; except where indicated

1. "Holy Day"
2. "The Trees They Grow So High" (Traditional)
3. "Sweetest Words"
4. "Last Train But One" (Dan Sealey)
5. "Courting Blues" (Bert Jansch)
6. "Midst of Summertime" (Sealey)
7. "Prometheus"
8. "The Stolen Child" (Poem by W. B. Yeats. Melody by Fowler. Music by Merrymouth)
9. "The Shadow Knows"
10. "Mr Marshall" (Sealey)
11. "Over My Head"
12. "The First Rites of Spring"
