= Simon Fowler =

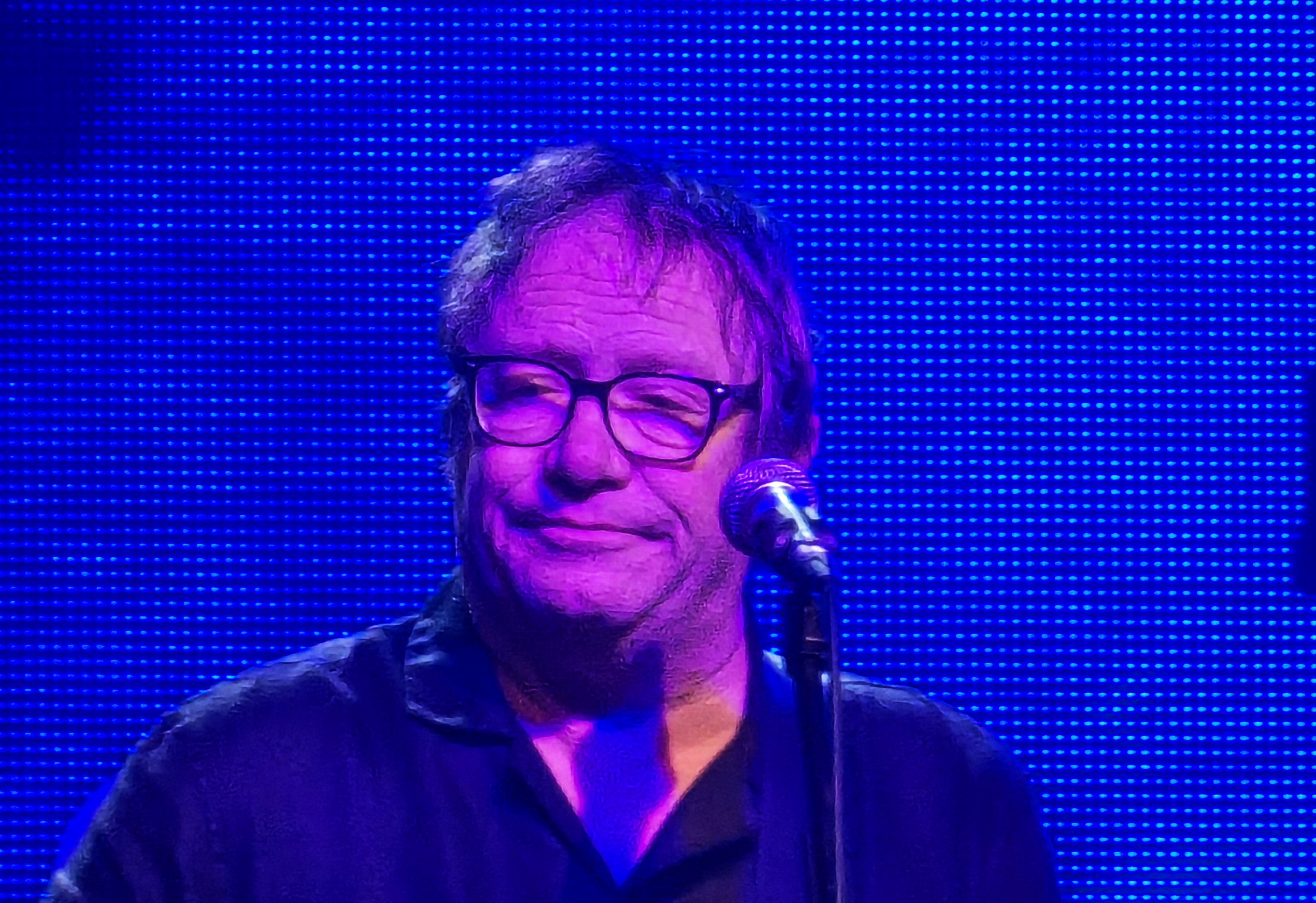
- Simon Fowler in 2025

Background information
- Also known as: Foxy
- Born: Simon Geoffrey Fowler; 25 May 1965 (age 61); Meriden, Warwickshire, England
- Genres: Rock, mod revival, folk
- Occupation: Musician
- Instruments: Vocals, guitar, harmonica
- Label: Moseley Shoals Records

Simon Geoffrey Fowler (born 25 May 1965) is an English musician, best known as the lead singer of Ocean Colour Scene.

== The Fanatics ==
Simon Fowler commenced his music career as the lead singer and songwriter for Birmingham band The Fanatics, which consisted of Simon Fowler (vocals & guitar), Damon Minchella (bass), Paul Wilkes (guitar) and Carolyn Bullock (drums). Future Ocean Colour Scene drummer and former Echo Base band member Oscar Harrison replaced Bullock on drums.

The Fanatics released one record in 1989 before splitting, the four-track Suburban Love Songs 12" vinyl EP on Chapter 22 Records (12 CHAP 38), containing the songs "1,2,3,4", "My Brother Sarah" (later re-recorded by Ocean Colour Scene), "Suburban Love Songs", and "Tight Rope". Following the demise of The Fanatics in late 1989, Fowler, Minchella and Harrison teamed up with guitar player Steve Cradock to form Ocean Colour Scene.

== Other works ==
Fowler has also appeared as a backing singer for Paul Weller, Alison Moyet, Fine Young Cannibals, and with Kate Rusby.

== Merrymouth ==
In 2012 Fowler formed the band Merrymouth with Ocean Colour Scene band member Dan Sealey, and Mike McNamara. Their debut album, Simon Fowler's Merrymouth, was released in March 2012, and their second album, Wenlock Hill, with the band joined by Adam Barry, was released in May 2014 and entered the UK Official Album Charts at No. 69, featuring guest appearances from John McCusker and Chas Hodges.

== Personal life ==
Fowler was outed as gay by The Sun newspaper in 1998, at which point his parents were still unaware of his sexuality.

Fowler is a supporter of Birmingham City Football Club.
