= Andy Cutting =

British melodeon player and folk music composer

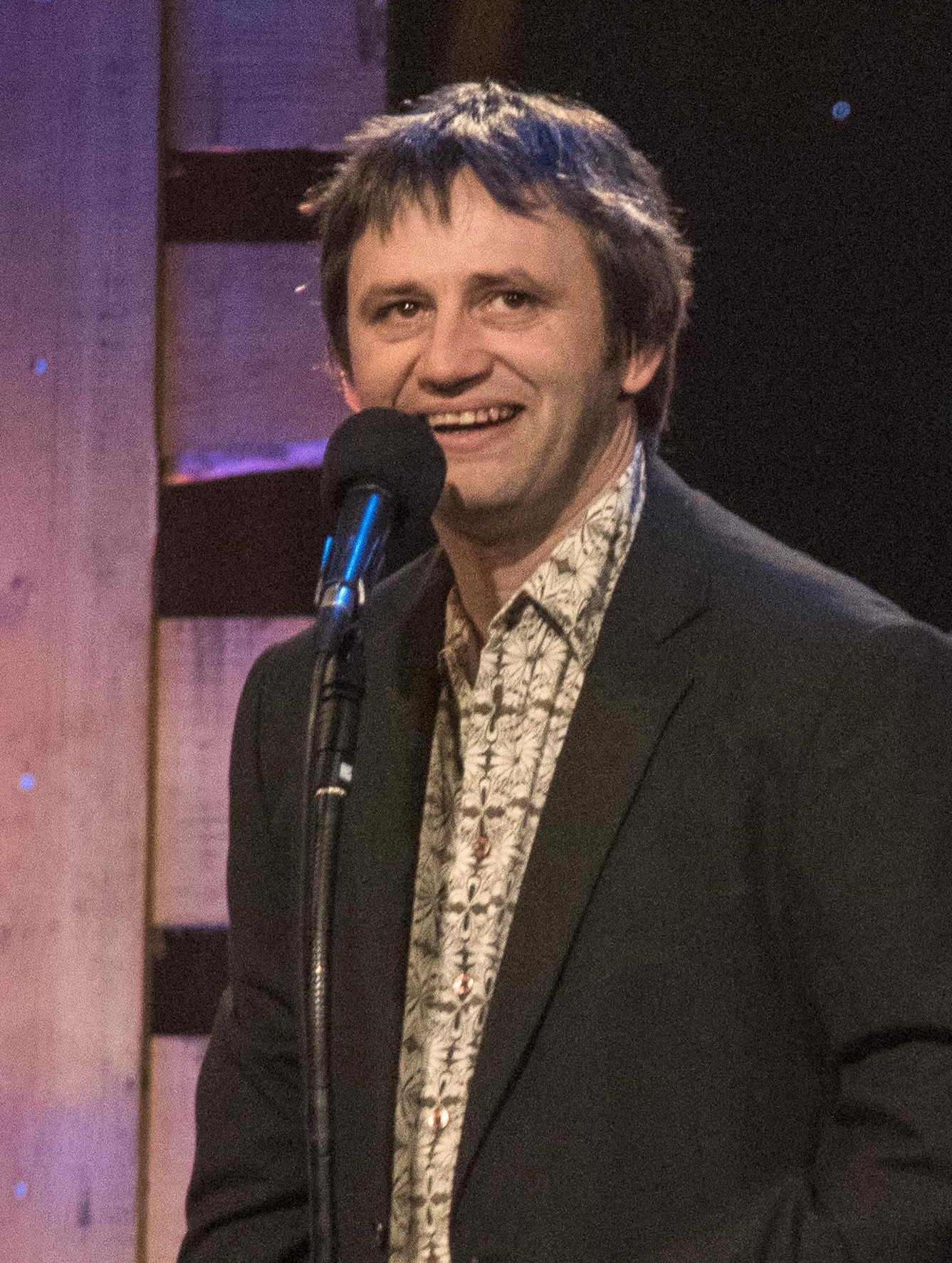
- Cutting in 2016

Background information
- Born: 18 March 1969 (age 57); Harrow, London
- Genres: Folk music
- Occupations: Musician, composer
- Instrument: Melodeon
- Years active: 1988–present
- Website: www.andy-cutting.co.uk

Andy Cutting (born 18 March 1969) is an English folk musician and composer. He plays melodeon and is best known for writing and performing traditional English folk and his own original compositions which combine English and French traditions with wider influences. He is three times winner of the Folk Musician of the Year award at the BBC Radio 2 Folk Awards and has appeared on around 50 albums, both as a solo artist and in collaboration with other musicians. He was born in Harrow, London and is married with three children.

== Career ==
Starting playing the melodeon in his early teens, Cutting was invited to join a local ceilidh band, Happenstance, when he had been playing for only a few months. In 1988 he joined the influential and innovative band Blowzabella (which also featured Nigel Eaton, with whom Cutting has since collaborated). Cutting made one album (Vanilla) with Blowzabella before they broke up in 1990. Their repertoire, blending English traditional music with that of central France and Eastern Europe, had a great influence on Cutting. Blowzabella subsequently reformed; they celebrated their 25th anniversary in 2003, with Cutting once again an official member. They released the album Octomento in 2007.

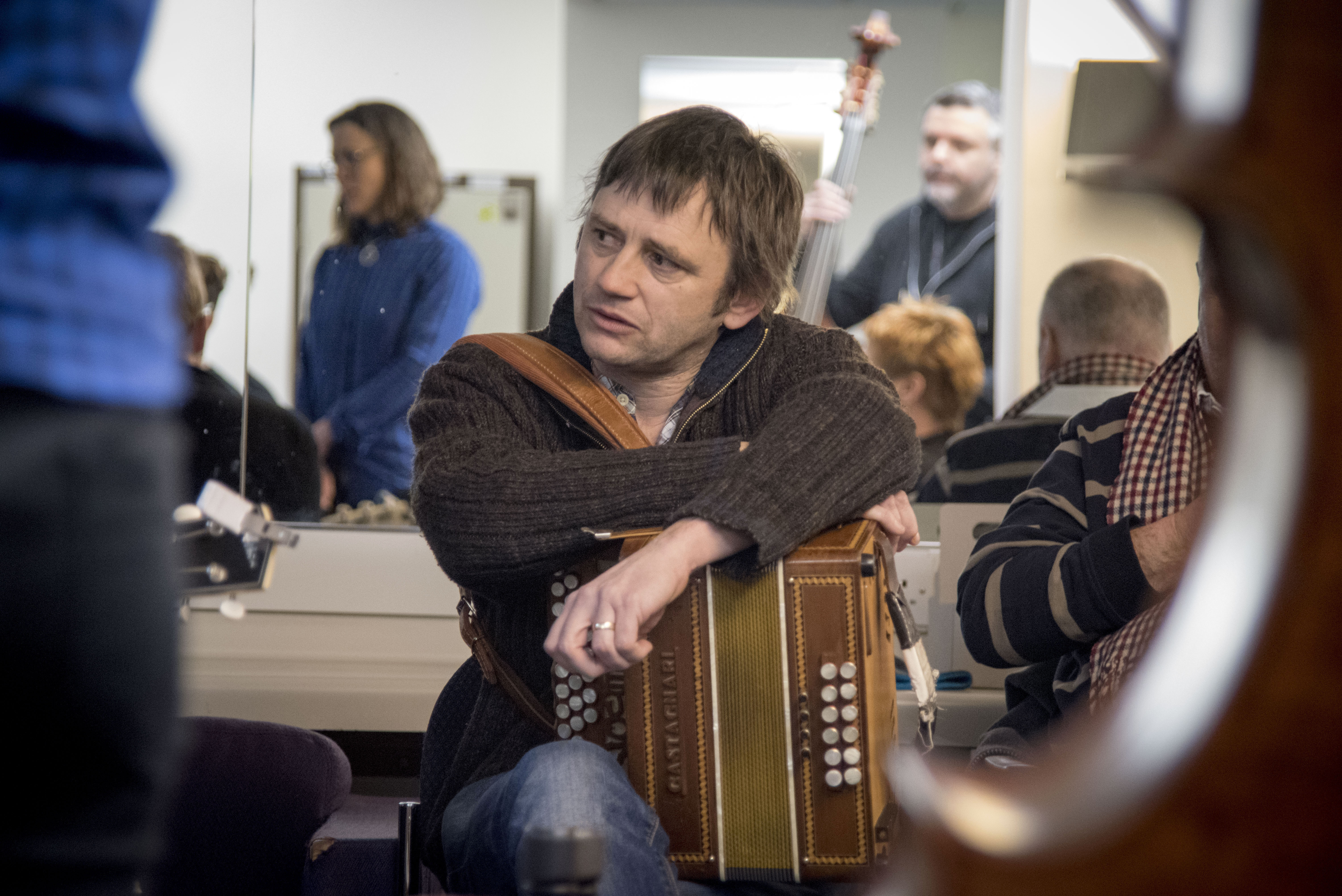
Andy Cutting backstage at Glasgow Royal Concert Hall in 2016

In 1989 Cutting formed a partnership with Chris Wood, whom he had met two years earlier at Sidmouth Folk Festival. They toured extensively over several years, reuniting in August 2010 for the Towersey Village Festival and have made five albums together. Wood introduced Cutting to a wealth of Québécois music and shared his love of English and French dance music. Wood & Cutting, together with Karen Tweed and Ian Carr, make up the Two Duos Quartet, who have made one album, Half as happy as we.

Tweed & Cutting have also worked as a duo; they have made one album together and contributed to a live CD, Across the Waters, recorded at Cork University in 1994.

Cutting works regularly as a session musician, with artists as diverse as Sting, June Tabor and Chumbawamba. He has been a member of several bands, including Fernhill and Tanteeka. As well as the Wood & Cutting duo, he is part of the trio 1651 (with Mark Emerson and Tim Harries), the John McCusker Band, the Kate Rusby Trio and the Kate Rusby Band. He is also a popular workshop tutor and has taught at summer schools for Folkworks. He is the diatonic accordion tutor at the Burwell Bash.

In March 2011, Cutting was part of the Cecil Sharp Project, a joint commission between Shrewsbury Folk Festival and EFDSS that saw him and seven other modern folk musicians take part in a week-long residential project to create new works related to life and works of folk collector Cecil Sharp.

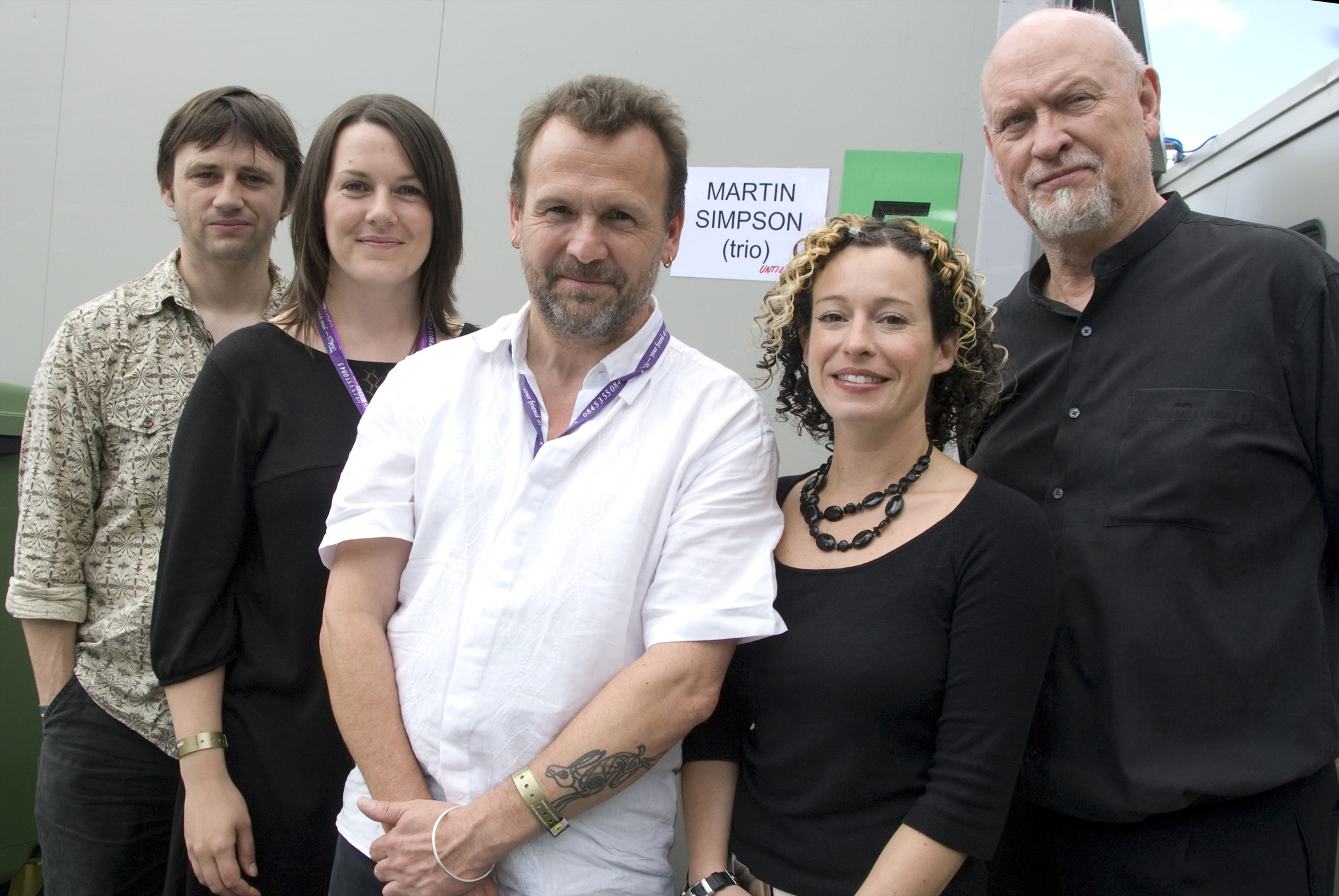
Martin Simpson trio (all five of them) at Cambridge Folk Festival (Cutting, left)

Andy Cutting is part of Leveret, with Sam Sweeney on fiddle and Rob Harbron on concertina. The trio formed in 2014 and have been described by The Guardian as "magical", and Cutting as a "melodeon and accordion virtuoso". In 2018 The Arts Desk named Leveret's album, Inventions one of their top 3 albums of the year, describing them as creating "strikingly new English instrumental music."

Cutting also performs and records as Simpson Cutting Kerr with guitarist Martin Simpson and fiddle player Nancy Kerr. Their debut CD Murmurs was well received with The Telegraph naming it one of the best folk albums of 2015, describing them as "three of Britain’s finest musicians and interpreters of songs and tunes, each an acknowledged virtuoso in their own right".

Cutting formed a new Anglo-French band, Topette!! in 2015.

Cutting has won the Folk Musician of the Year award at the BBC Radio 2 Folk Awards three times: 2008, 2011 and 2016.

== Compositions ==
Cutting has composed many tunes, several of which have been recorded by other artists. Some have passed into the music session repertoire. His compositions include:

- A Habit of Hills
- A Pound Off a Haircut
- Alltfechan
- At Halsway
- Brakes
- Chalendeix
- Commoner's Lot
- Flatworld
- Greenfield House
- Heidi Hendy
- Henry Blogg
- Horseshoe Harbour
- Hunger Hill
- In Continental Mood
- It's a Square World
- I Like You, You're Common
- I Only Want a Snack
- Isleworth Bridge
- It's a Square Word
- Jacques Covemaker
- Josephine's
- Lady Grey
- Le Petit Chien
- Lola Flexen
- Long Legs
- Milford
- Miss Lindsay Barker
- Never Knowingly Underfed
- New Pneus
- Oakleigh
- Old Light
- Oliver's
- Potato
- Ricer
- Ricer II
- Round the Corner
- Seven Years
- Simon and Candy's Halsway Jig
- Spaghetti Panic
- St Michael's Mount
- The Abbess
- The Bay Tree
- The History Man
- The Long Drive
- The RSB
- The Walled Garden Waltz
- Theatre
- There are Angels
- To The Edges
- Turner's
- Two Beers
- Two Ladies
- Uphill Way
- Waltz Harry Lane
- Waiting for Janet
- Venture

== Partial discography ==
His recordings include:

- Vanilla (Blowzabella) – Special Delivery – SPDCD 1028 (1990)
- Chris Wood & Andy Cutting – RUF Records RUFCD01
- Lisa (Wood & Cutting) – RUF Records RUFCD02
- Live at Sidmouth (Wood & Cutting) – RUF Records RUFCD03
- Lusignac (Wood & Cutting) – RUF Records RUFCD04
- Half as happy as we (Two Duos Quartet) – RUF Records RUFCD07
- Knock John (Wood & Cutting) – RUF Records RUFCD08
- A new tradition (Tanteeka) – Osmosys Records OSMO CD013 (1997)
- Panic at the Café (Andy Cutting and Nigel Eaton, (1993) – Beautiful Jo Records BEJOCD-27 (1999)
- Ca' Nôs (Fernhill) – Beautiful Jo Records BJOCD-14
- Llatai (Fernhill) – Beautiful Jo Records BJOCD-23
- Whilia (Fernhill) – Beautiful Jo Records BJOCD-30
- Cast a bell (1651) – Beautiful Jo Records BEJOCD-33 (2001)
- One Roof Under (Tweed & Cutting) – Fyasco Records FYC004 (2002)
- Across the Waters (contributor, with Karen Tweed and others) – Nimbus NI5415 (1994)
- Pandemonium (Nigel Eaton) – Beautiful Jo Records BEJOCD-39 (2002)
- 10 (Kate Rusby) – Pure Records PRCD10 (2002)
- Apples (June Tabor) – Topic Records TSCD 568
- Hold Your Horses (Ella Edmondson) – Monsoon MONMUCD001 (2009)
- Andy Cutting (Andy Cutting) – Lane Records LANECD01 (2010)
- New Anything (Leveret) (2015)
- Murmurs (Martin Simpson, Nancy Kerr and Andy Cutting) — Topic Records (2015)
- Chez Michel EP (Topette!!) (2015)
- In The Round (Leveret) (2016)
- Inventions (Leveret) (2017)
- C'est Le Pompon (Topette!!) (2017)
- Two Score (Blowzabella) (2018)
- Diversions (Leveret) (2019)
- Rhododendron (Topette!!) (2019)
- Variations Live (Leveret (2020)
- Bourdon (Topette!!) (2022)
- Tilham (Blowzabella) (2022)
- Forms (Leveret) (2023)
- Duo Niepold Cutting (Anne Niepold and Andy Cutting) (2023)
- Conversations (Gudrun Walther and Andy Cutting) (2023)
- ON - Live at the Jam Jar (Topette!!) (2024)
- Lost Measures (Leveret) (2025)

In 2009 Fulmine from Vanilla was included in Topic Records 70-year anniversary boxed set Three Score and Ten as track twenty one on the seventh CD.

== Books ==
Cutting contributed tunes and a biographical essay to:

- Blowzabella – New Tunes for Dancing (by Andy Cutting, Nigel Eaton, Jo Freya, Paul James, Ian Luff, Cliff Stapleton, David Shepherd, Jon Swayne), Blowzabella, Glastonbury (2004) ISBN 0-9549013-0-4

Cutting contributed tunes to:

- The Waltz Book IV (collected & edited by Bill Matthiesen), (2013) ISBN 978-0-9633787-5-0

== See also ==
- Castagnari
- Contemporary folk music
- John Kirkpatrick (folk musician)
- Johnny Connolly
- Peter Wyper
