= Megson (band) =

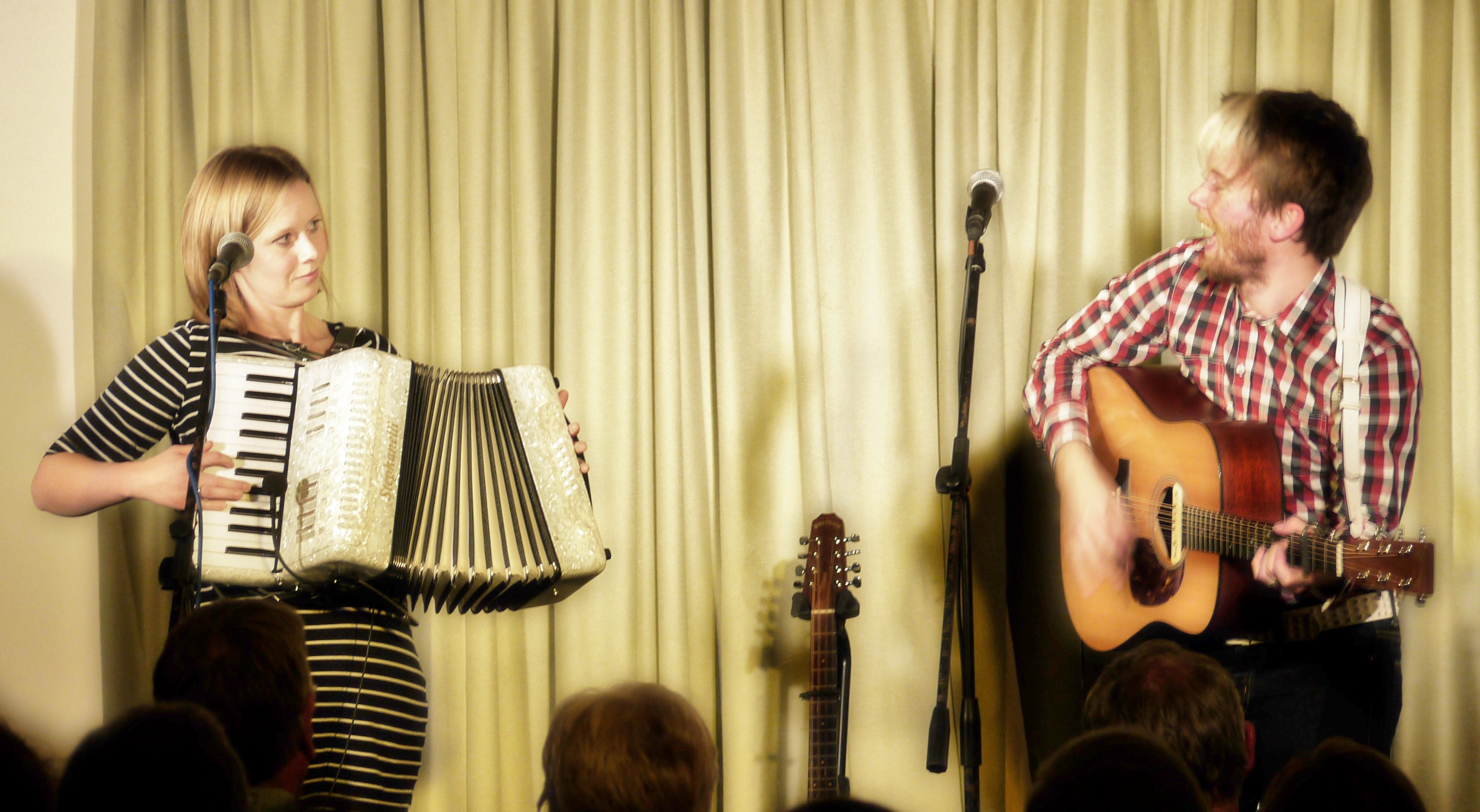
- Megson playing at Ring O' Bells pub in Nailsea, Somerset in 2010

Background information
- Origin: Billingham and Middlesbrough, England
- Genres: Folk
- Instruments: Vocals, acoustic guitar, mandolin, whistle, accordion
- Years active: 2004–present
- Label: edj (independent label)
- Members: Stu Hanna; Debbie Hanna
- Website: www.megsonmusic.co.uk

Megson are an English folk duo composed of husband and wife Stu Hanna and Debbie Hanna (previously Debbie Palmer). The duo have released thirteen albums and two EPs on their own label, edj. Their live performances feature Stu playing a guitar or mandolin and Debbie sometimes playing accordion or tin whistle as backing to their vocal harmonies.

== Biography ==
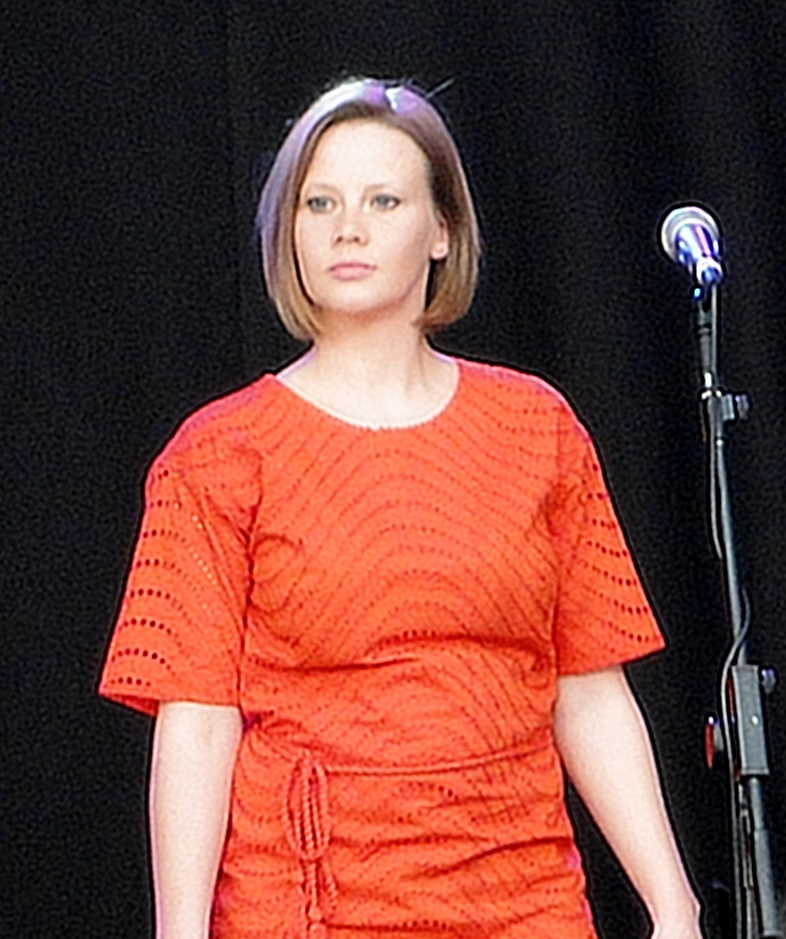
Debbie Hanna in July 2012

The duo met while singing in Cleveland Youth Choir before moving to London to allow Debbie to study classical music while Stu became involved with a progressive rock band. In 2004 they began making their own music and released their first album, On The Side, while performing at acoustic clubs around London.

Megson named themselves after Debbie's family dog, who at the time had just died. They had originally decided upon "The Ghost of Meg", but their family and friends convinced them that it sounded like a death-metal band.

Megson's first album, On The Side, consisted of a mixture of self-penned and traditional songs. Released in 2004, the album caught the attention of Seth Lakeman, whose brother Sean helped produce their second album, Smoke Of Home, which further explored the wealth of traditional songs from around their home in Teesside as well as self-composed songs in the same style. Their third album, Take Yourself A Wife, was recorded while they were planning their wedding and consists of their own take on traditional and Victorian folk songs. The Longshot, consists of songs about work from the North East of England and their own experiences of English culture, especially sport and the textile industry. When I Was A Lad features traditional childhood songs and new compositions written for their first child. Live captures a performance at Hitchin Folk Club. In A Box consists of songs about the way we live – then and now.

They have been nominated for "Best Duo" at the BBC Radio 2 Folk Awards three years in a row and have garnered airplay from several radio DJs including BBC Radio 2's Bob Harris, who invited them to do a live studio session for his show in 2007. They also accompanied Lucy Ward on her 2011 album, Adelphi Has to Fly, which was produced by Stu Hanna.

== Discography ==
Albums

- On the Side (2004)
- Smoke of Home (2007)
- Take Yourself a Wife (2008)
- The Longshot (2010)
- When I Was a Lad (2012)
- Live (2013)
- In a Box (2014)
- Good Times Will Come Again (2016)
- Contradicshun (2019)
- Little Bird (2019)
- A Yuletide Carol (2020)
- Unknown Waters (2022)
- What Are We Trying To Say? (2023)

EPs

- Follow It On (2006)
- To Get Home (2025)
