= Navigator Records =

English independent record label

- Parent company: Proper Music Distribution
- Founded: 2008
- Distributor(s): Proper Music Distribution
- Genre: Folk and roots music.
- Country of origin: United Kingdom
- Location: London
- Official website: Navigator Records

Navigator Records is a small independent record label in the United Kingdom, specialising in folk and roots music. It is wholly owned by Proper Music Distribution and was launched in 2008.

Musicians who have recorded on Navigator Records include Alyth, Jon Boden, Bellowhead, Bella Hardy, Boo Hewerdine, Benji Kirkpatrick, Sean Lakeman, Lau, Merrymouth, Oysterband, Paper Aeroplanes, Kathryn Roberts, Georgia Ruth and Lucy Ward.
