= List of UK top-ten singles in 1997 =

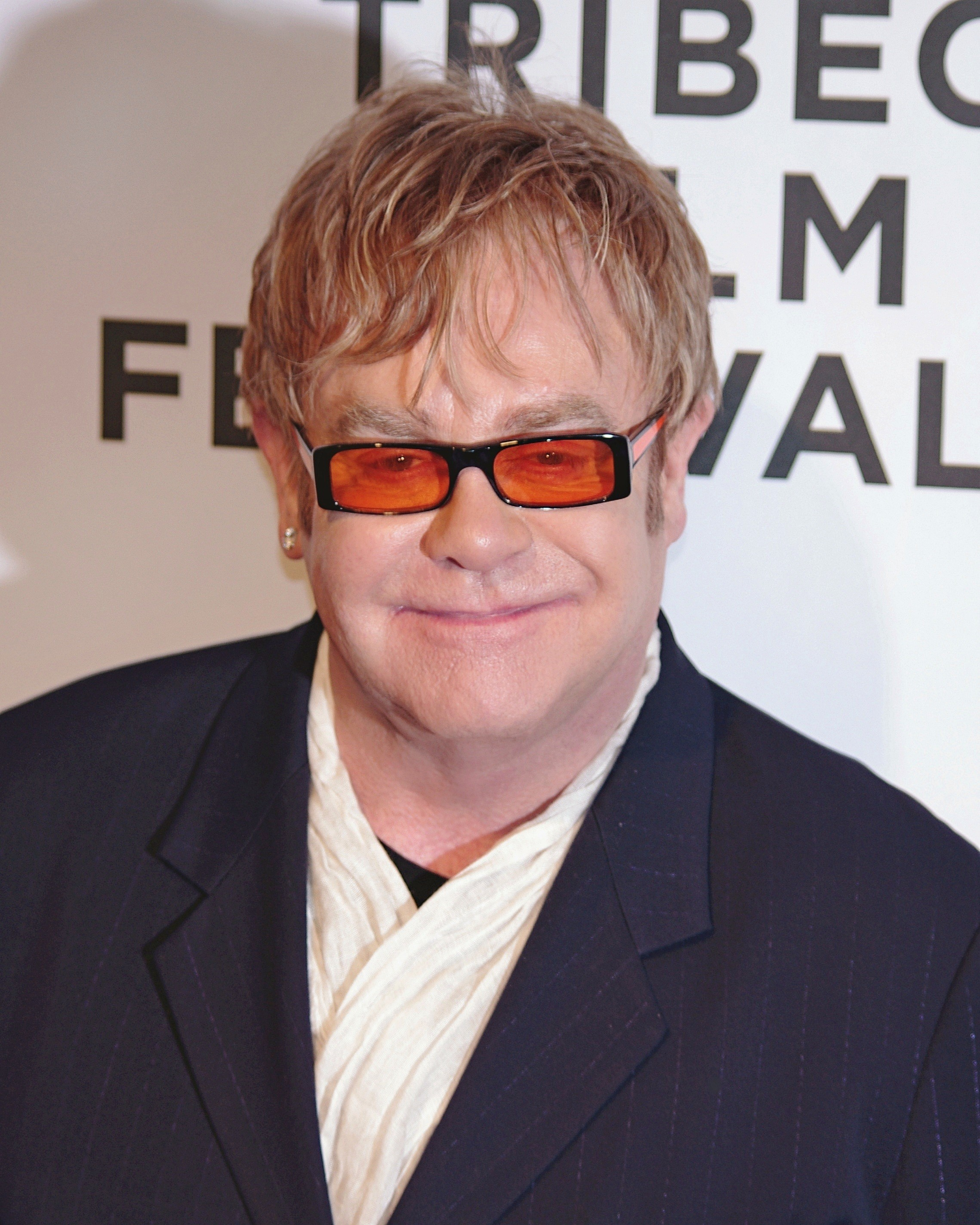
Elton John (pictured in 2011) achieved the best-selling single of 1997 with "Something About the Way You Look Tonight"/"Candle in the Wind 1997", a tribute to Diana, Princess of Wales. The song entered the charts at number-one in September, where it remained for five weeks, ultimately spending 13 non-consecutive weeks in the top 10. It remains the best-selling single in UK chart history with over 4.77 million copies sold.

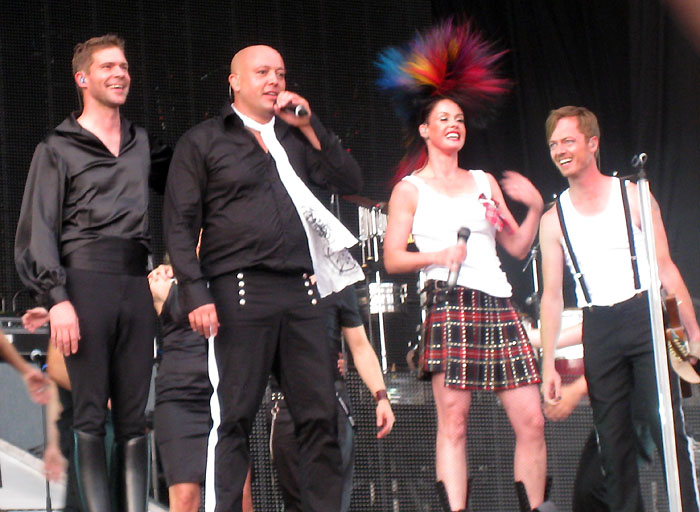
Danish-Norwegian group Aqua (pictured in 2008) scored the second best selling single of the year with their signature song "Barbie Girl", which topped the chart for four weeks and spent 12 weeks in the top 10.

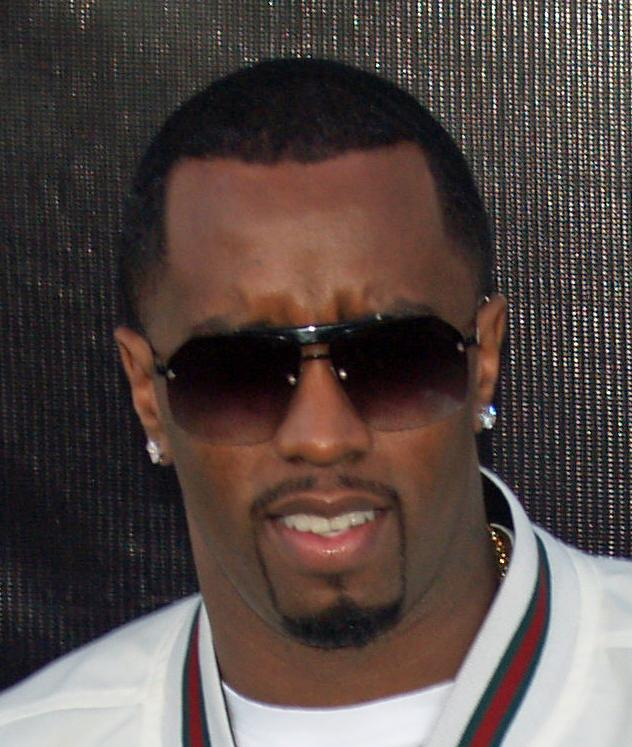
In 1997, Puff Daddy (pictured in 2007) recorded a tribute song to his recently deceased friend, The Notorious B.I.G., called "I'll Be Missing You". Sampling The Police's 1983 hit "Every Breath You Take", the track features vocals from Biggie's widow, singer Faith Evans, and R&B group 112. The song spent 12 weeks in the UK top 10, with six of those weeks at number-one, becoming the third best selling single of the year.

The UK singles chart is one of many music charts compiled by the Official Charts Company that calculates the best-selling singles of the week in the United Kingdom. Before 2004, the chart was only based on the sales of physical singles. This list shows singles that peaked in the Top 10 of the UK singles chart during 1997, as well as singles which peaked in 1996 and 1998 but were in the top 10 in 1997. The entry date is when the single appeared in the top 10 for the first time (week ending, as published by the Official Charts Company, which is six days after the chart is announced).

Two hundred and twenty-eight singles were in the top ten in 1997. Ten singles from 1996 remained in the top 10 for several weeks at the beginning of the year. "Angels" by Robbie Williams and "Never Ever" by All Saints were both released in 1997 but did not reach their peak until 1998. Sixty-four artists scored multiple entries in the top 10 in 1997. All Saints, Aqua, Daft Punk, Natalie Imbruglia and No Doubt were among the many artists who achieved their first UK charting top 10 single in 1997.

Elton John recorded a reworking of his 1973 single "Candle in the Wind as a tribute to Diana, Princess of Wales, who died in 1997. Released as a double-A side with "Something About the Way You Look Tonight" and spending five weeks at number-one, it sold almost 4.8 million copies and remains (as of 2018) the best-selling single of all-time. The other major event to impact the charts in 1997 was the passing of The Notorious B.I.G. A tribute song by Puff Daddy, the rapper's wife Faith Evans and R&B group 112, "I'll Be Missing You" which sampled The Police's "Every Breath You Take", ranked as the third best-selling single of the year.

The 1996 Christmas number-one, "2 Become 1" by Spice Girls, remained at number-one for the first two weeks of 1997. The first new number-one single of the year was "Professional Widow (It's Got to Be Big)" by Tori Amos. Overall, twenty-four different singles peaked at number-one in 1997, with Spice Girls (4) having the most singles hit that position.

== Background ==
=== Multiple entries ===
Two-hundred and twenty-eight singles charted in the top 10 in 1997, with two-hundred and sixteen singles reaching their peak this year.

Sixty-four artists scored multiple entries in the top 10 in 1997. U2 frontman Bono and the five members of Boyzone shared the record for the most top ten singles in 1997 with five hit singles each. Four of Bono's entries were with the band, the most successful of which was the number-one hit "Discothèque" in February. "Staring at the Sun" peaked at number 3 in April, "Please" made number 7 in September and "Last Night on Earth" reached number 10 in July. His other appearance was on the BBC charity single for Children in Need, "Perfect Day", alongside artists such as Boyzone, David Bowie, Elton John and the original composer of the song Lou Reed. The song entered the chart in November and spent 3 weeks at number-one, and 9 weeks in the top 10. Along with U2, eight other acts had four singles in the top 10: 911, Backstreet Boys, Boyzone, Brett Anderson (from the britpop band Suede), George Michael, Spice Girls and Texas

No Doubt were one of a number of artists with two top-ten entries, including the number-one single "Don't Speak". All Saints, Daft Punk, Jon Bon Jovi, Oasis and Toni Braxton were among the other artists who had multiple top 10 entries in 1997.

=== Chart debuts ===
Eighty-five artists achieved their first top 10 single in 1997, either as a lead or featured artist. Of these, fourteen went on to record another hit single that year: All Saints, The Course, Daft Punk, DJ Quicksilver, Eels, Hanson, Kavana, Mansun, No Doubt, No Mercy, The Notorious B.I.G., Orbital, The Seahorses and Shola Ama. Sash! and The Verve both had two other entries in their breakthrough year.

The following table (collapsed on desktop site) does not include acts who had previously charted as part of a group and secured their first top 10 solo single.

Artist	Number of top 10s	First entry	Chart position	Other entries
Orbital	2	"Satan Live"	3	"The Saint" (3)
Kavana	2	"I Can Make You Feel Good"	8	"MFEO" (8)
The Dirty Rotten Scoundrels	1	"People Hold On"	4	—
No Mercy	2	"Where Do You Go"	2	"Please Don't Go" (4)
White Town	1	"Your Woman"	1	—
Placebo	1	"Nancy Boy"	4	—
Blue Boy	1	"Remember Me"	8	—
Mansun	2	"She Makes My Nose Bleed"	9	"Closed for Business" (10)
Eels	2	"Novocaine for the Soul"	10	"Susan's House" (9)
No Doubt	2	"Don't Speak"	1	"Just a Girl" (3)
Daft Punk	2	"Da Funk"/"Musique"	7	"Around the World" (5)
DJ Kool	1	"Let Me Clear My Throat"	8	—
Sash!	3	"Encore une fois"	2	"Ecuador" (2), "Stay" (2)
Bush	1	"Swallowed"	7	—
DJ Quicksilver	2	"Bellissima"	4	"Free" (7)
B-Real	1	"Hit 'Em High (The Monstars' Anthem)"	8	—
Herbie	1	"Gotta Be You"	10	—
Smoke City	1	"Underwater Love"	4	—
Makaveli	1	"To Live & Die in L.A."	10	—
The Course	2	"Ready or Not"	5	"Ain't Nobody" (8)
Shola Ama	2	"You Might Need Somebody"	4	"You're the One I Love" (3)
The Cardigans	1	"Lovefool"	2	—
Republica	1	"Drop Dead Gorgeous"	7	—
The Notorious B.I.G.	2	"Hypnotize"	10	"Mo Money Mo Problems" (6)
The Seahorses	2	"Love is the Law"	3	"Blinded by the Sun" (7)
Olive	1	"You're Not Alone"	1	—
North & South	1	"I'm a Man Not a Boy"	7	—
Andrea Bocelli	1	"Time to Say Goodbye"	2	—
BeBe Winans	1	"I Wanna Be the Only One"	1	—
Rosie Gaines	1	"Closer than Close"	4	—
Hanson	2	"MMMBop"	1	"Where's the Love" (4)
Sneaker Pimps	1	"6 Underground"	9	—
Toby Bourke	1	"Waltz Away Dreaming"	10	—
Ultra Naté	1	"Free"	4	—
Mr. President	1	"Coco Jamboo"	8	—
Az Yet	1	"Hard to Say I'm Sorry"	7	—
Foxy Brown	1	"I'll Be"	9	—
Jay-Z	1	"I'll Be"	9	—
Puff Daddy	1	"I'll Be Missing You"	1	—
Faith Evans	1	"I'll Be Missing You"	1	—
112	1	"I'll Be Missing You"	1	—
The Verve	3	"Bitter Sweet Symphony"	2	"The Drugs Don't Work" (1), "Lucky Man" (7)
40 Thevz	1	"C U When U Get There"	3	—
Gala	1	"Freed from Desire"	2	—
Marsha Ambrosius	1	"Piece of My Heart"	7	—
Babyface	1	"How Come, How Long"	10	—
Changing Faces	1	"G.H.E.T.T.O.U.T."	10	—
Meredith Brooks	1	"Bitch"	6	—
Chumbawamba	1	"Tubthumping"	2	—
Tina Moore	1	"Never Gonna Let You Go"	7	—
All Saints	2	"I Know Where It's At"	4	"Never Ever" (1)
Ginuwine	1	"When Doves Cry"	10	—
Finley Quaye	1	"Even After All"	10	—
Ricky Martin	1	"María"	6	—
Portishead	1	"All Mine"	8	—
Dario G	1	"Sunchyme"	2	—
Bellini	1	"Samba de Janeiro"	8	—
Q-Tip	1	"Got 'til It's Gone"	6	—
Joni Mitchell	1	"Got 'til It's Gone"	6	—
La Trec	1	"Stay"	2	—
Propellerheads	1	"On Her Majesty's Secret Service"	7	—
David Arnold	1	"On Her Majesty's Secret Service"	7	—
Aqua	1	"Barbie Girl"	1	—
The Brand New Heavies	1	"You've Got a Friend"	9	—
Natalie Imbruglia	1	"Torn"	2	—
Embrace	1	"All You Good Good People (EP)"	8	—
PF Project	1	"Choose Life"	6	—
Ewan McGregor	1	"Choose Life"	6	—
Burning Spear	1	"Perfect Day"	1	—
Courtney Pine	1	"Perfect Day"	1	—
Dr. John	1	"Perfect Day"	1	—
Emmylou Harris	1	"Perfect Day"	1	—
Evan Dando	1	"Perfect Day"	1	—
Lesley Garrett	1	"Perfect Day"	1	—
Robert Cray	1	"Perfect Day"	1	—
Skye Edwards	1	"Perfect Day"	1	—
Thomas Allen	1	"Perfect Day"	1	—
Visual Ministry Choir	1	"Perfect Day"	1	—
Steven Houghton	1	"Wind Beneath My Wings"	3	—
Lutricia McNeal	1	"Ain't That Just the Way"	6	—
Aaron Carter	1	"Crush on You"	9	—
Teletubbies	1	"Teletubbies say "Eh-oh!""	1	—
Five	1	"Slam Dunk (Da Funk)"	10	—
Mase	1	"Feel So Good"	10	—

Notes

Makaveli was a pseudonym used by the late Tupac Shakur, who had charted at number six under the name 2Pac in 1996 with "California Love", alongside Dr. Dre. The Seahorses was formed by former The Stone Roses guitarist John Squire. His old group had debuted in 1989 with "Fools Gold"/"What the World is Waiting For", a number 8 hit.

"Midnight in Chelsea" was Jon Bon Jovi's first single to make an impact without his bandmates, peaking at number four. He had a second hit single this year, "Queen of New Orleans", which reached number 10. Will Smith first made the chart in the duo DJ Jazzy Jeff and the Fresh Prince using his character name from The Fresh Prince of Bel-Air. The single "Men in Black" was the first time he charted under his own name.

The "Perfect Day" charity single brought together musicians and performers from across entertainment, both established and new to the UK charts but performing as this line-up for the first time. The solo artists with previous chart credits were David Bowie, Elton John, Gabrielle, Joan Armatrading, Laurie Anderson, Lou Reed, Suzanne Vega, Tammy Wynette, and Tom Jones. Several artists had made the charts with their groups before, including Bono (U2), Brett Anderson (Suede), Heather Small (M People), Huey Morgan (Fun Lovin' Criminals), Ian Broudie (The Lightning Seeds), Shane MacGowan (The Pogues), as well as Keith Duffy, Michael Graham, Ronan Keating, Shane Lynch and Stephen Gately (all Boyzone). Additionally, conductor Andrew Davis, the BBC Symphony Orchestra, string group Brodsky Quartet, soprano saxophone player Courtney Pine and tenor horn player Sheona White all played on the track.

=== Songs from films ===
Original songs from various films entered the top 10 throughout the year. These included "Ain't Nobody" and "Love Rollercoaster" (from Beavis & Butthead Do America), "Rumble in the Jungle" (When We Were Kings), "I Believe I Can Fly" and "Hit 'Em High (The Monstars' Anthem)" (Space Jam), "Another Suitcase in Another Hall" (Evita), "The Saint" (The Saint), "Lovefool" (Romeo + Juliet), "The End Is the Beginning Is the End" and "Gotham City" (Batman & Robin), "Men in Black" (Men in Black), "James Bond Theme" (Tomorrow Never Dies), "You Sexy Thing" (The Full Monty) and "Spice Up Your Life" and "Too Much" (Spiceworld: The Movie).

=== Best-selling singles ===
Elton John had the best-selling single of the year with "Something About the Way You Look Tonight"/"Candle in the Wind 1997". The song spent thirteen weeks in the top 10 (including five weeks at number one), sold over 4.77 million copies and was certified 8× platinum by the BPI. "Barbie Girl" by Aqua came in second place, selling more than 1.5 million copies and losing out by around 3.27 million sales. Puff Daddy & Faith Evans featuring 112's "I'll Be Missing You", "Perfect Day" from Various Artists and "Teletubbies say "Eh-oh!" " by Teletubbies made up the top five. Singles by Will Smith, No Doubt, Natalie Imbruglia, Spice Girls and Chumbawamba were also in the top ten best-selling singles of the year.

"Something About the Way You Look Tonight"/"Candle in the Wind 1997" (1) was ranked as the best-selling single of the decade, while "Barbie Girl" (4), "Perfect Day" (6) and "I'll Be Missing You" (9) were all ranked in the top 10 best-selling singles of the 1990s. "Something About the Way You Look Tonight"/"Candle in the Wind 1997" also stands as the biggest-selling single of all time in the UK (as of July 2018).

== Top-ten singles ==
Key

Symbol	Meaning
‡	Single peaked in 1996 but still in chart in 1997.
♦	Single released in 1997 but peaked in 1998.
(#)	Year-end top-ten single position and rank
Entered	The date that the single first appeared in the chart.
Peak	Highest position that the single reached in the UK Singles Chart.

Entered (week ending)	Weeks in top 10	Single	Artist	Peak	Peak reached (week ending)	Weeks at peak
Singles in 1996
2 November 1996	12	"Un-Break My Heart" ‡	Toni Braxton	2	21 December 1996	2
16 November 1996	9	"One and One" ‡	Robert Miles featuring Maria Nayler	3	21 December 1996	1
16 November 1996	4	"Hillbilly Rock Hillbilly Roll" ‡	The Woolpackers	5	23 November 1996	1
23 November 1996	8	"Breathe" ‡	The Prodigy	1	23 November 1996	2
14 December 1996	4	"A Different Beat" ‡	Boyzone	1	14 December 1996	1
21 December 1996	3	"Knockin' on Heaven's Door"/"Throw These Guns Away" ‡	Dunblane	1	21 December 1996	1
21 December 1996	4	"Horny" ‡	Mark Morrison	5	21 December 1996	1
21 December 1996	3	"All by Myself" ‡	Celine Dion	6	21 December 1996	1
28 December 1996	4	"2 Become 1" ‡	Spice Girls	1	28 December 1996	3
28 December 1996	5	"Don't Cry for Me Argentina" ‡	Madonna	3	28 December 1996	1
Singles in 1997
11 January 1997	4	"Professional Widow (It's Got to Be Big)" ^{[B]}	Tori Amos	1	18 January 1997	1
11 January 1997	1	"Satan Live"	Orbital	3	11 January 1997	1
11 January 1997	8	"Don't Let Go (Love)"	En Vogue	5	11 January 1997	3
11 January 1997	1	"I Can Make You Feel Good"	Kavana	8	11 January 1997	1
18 January 1997	2	"Quit Playing Games (with My Heart)"	Backstreet Boys	2	18 January 1997	1
18 January 1997	1	"Hey Child"	East 17	3	18 January 1997	1
18 January 1997	2	"People Hold On"	Lisa Stansfield vs. The Dirty Rotten Scoundrels	4	18 January 1997	1
18 January 1997	4	"Say What You Want"	Texas	3	25 January 1997	1
18 January 1997	9	"Where Do You Go"	No Mercy	2	8 February 1997	2
25 January 1997	3	"Your Woman"	White Town	1	25 January 1997	1
25 January 1997	1	"Saturday Night"	Suede	6	25 January 1997	1
25 January 1997	1	"Come Back Brighter"	Reef	8	25 January 1997	1
1 February 1997	2	"Beetlebum"	Blur	1	1 February 1997	1
1 February 1997	1	"Older"/"I Can't Make You Love Me"	George Michael	3	1 February 1997	1
1 February 1997	2	"Nancy Boy"	Placebo	4	1 February 1997	1
1 February 1997	1	"Walk On By"	Gabrielle	7	1 February 1997	1
1 February 1997	5	"Remember Me" ^{[C]}	Blue Boy	8	15 February 1997	1
8 February 1997	2	"Ain't Nobody"	LL Cool J	1	8 February 1997	1
8 February 1997	1	"Toxygene"	The Orb	4	8 February 1997	1
8 February 1997	1	"Do You Know"	Michelle Gayle	6	8 February 1997	1
8 February 1997	1	"I Finally Found Someone"	Barbra Streisand & Bryan Adams	10	8 February 1997	1
15 February 1997	2	"Discothèque"	U2	1	15 February 1997	1
15 February 1997	1	"Clementine"	Mark Owen	3	15 February 1997	1
15 February 1997	1	"Barrel of a Gun"	Depeche Mode	4	15 February 1997	1
15 February 1997	1	"Ain't Talkin' 'bout Dub"	Apollo 440	7	15 February 1997	1
15 February 1997	1	"She Makes My Nose Bleed"	Mansun	9	15 February 1997	1
15 February 1997	1	"Novocaine for the Soul"	Eels	10	15 February 1997	1
22 February 1997	9	"Don't Speak" (#7)	No Doubt	1	22 February 1997	3
22 February 1997	2	"I Shot the Sheriff"	Warren G	2	22 February 1997	1
22 February 1997	2	"The Day We Find Love"	911	4	22 February 1997	1
22 February 1997	1	"Da Funk"/"Musique"	Daft Punk	7	22 February 1997	1
22 February 1997	1	"Let Me Clear My Throat"	DJ Kool	8	22 February 1997	1
22 February 1997	1	"She's a Star"	James	9	22 February 1997	1
1 March 1997	7	"Encore une fois"	Sash!	2	1 March 1997	1
1 March 1997	2	"You Got the Love (Now Voyager Mix)" ^{[D]}	The Source featuring Candi Staton	3	1 March 1997	1
1 March 1997	3	"Alone"	Bee Gees	5	1 March 1997	3
1 March 1997	1	"Swallowed"	Bush	7	1 March 1997	1
8 March 1997	2	"Hush"	Kula Shaker	2	8 March 1997	1
8 March 1997	2	"Don't You Love Me"	Eternal	3	8 March 1997	1
8 March 1997	1	"Natural"	Peter Andre	6	8 March 1997	1
8 March 1997	1	"Show Me Love (1997 Remixes)" ^{[E]}	Robin S.	9	8 March 1997	1
15 March 1997	5	"Mama"/"Who Do You Think You Are"	Spice Girls	1	15 March 1997	3
15 March 1997	2	"Rumble in the Jungle"	Fugees featuring A Tribe Called Quest, Busta Rhymes & John Forté	3	15 March 1997	1
15 March 1997	1	"Moan and Groan"	Mark Morrison	7	15 March 1997	1
15 March 1997	1	"Shout"	Ant & Dec	10	15 March 1997	1
22 March 1997	2	"Isn't It a Wonder"	Boyzone	2	22 March 1997	1
22 March 1997	1	"If I Never See You Again"	Wet Wet Wet	3	22 March 1997	1
22 March 1997	2	"Fresh!"	Gina G	6	22 March 1997	1
22 March 1997	1	"Love Guaranteed"	Damage	7	22 March 1997	1
22 March 1997	1	"The Real Thing"	Lisa Stansfield	9	22 March 1997	1
22 March 1997	1	"It's Over"	Clock	10	22 March 1997	1
29 March 1997	10	"I Believe I Can Fly"	R. Kelly	1	12 April 1997	3
29 March 1997	1	"Anywhere for You"	Backstreet Boys	4	29 March 1997	1
29 March 1997	1	"Flash"	B.B.E.	5	29 March 1997	1
29 March 1997	1	"Another Suitcase in Another Hall"	Madonna	7	29 March 1997	1
29 March 1997	1	"A Red Letter Day"	Pet Shop Boys	9	29 March 1997	1
5 April 1997	2	"Block Rockin' Beats"	The Chemical Brothers	1	5 April 1997	1
5 April 1997	1	"North Country Boy"	The Charlatans	4	5 April 1997	1
5 April 1997	8	"Bellissima" ^{[F]}	DJ Quicksilver	4	19 April 1997	2
5 April 1997	1	"Free Me"	Cast	7	5 April 1997	1
5 April 1997	1	"Hit 'Em High (The Monstars' Anthem)"	B-Real, Busta Rhymes, Coolio, LL Cool J & Method Man	8	5 April 1997	1
5 April 1997	1	"Gotta Be You"	3T featuring Herbie	10	5 April 1997	1
12 April 1997	1	"Richard III"	Supergrass	2	12 April 1997	1
12 April 1997	1	"Underwater Love"	Smoke City	4	12 April 1997	1
12 April 1997	1	"It's No Good"	Depeche Mode	5	12 April 1997	1
12 April 1997	1	"To Live & Die in L.A."	Makaveli ^{[G]}	10	12 April 1997	1
19 April 1997	1	"Song 2"	Blur	2	19 April 1997	1
19 April 1997	1	"The Saint"	Orbital	3	19 April 1997	1
19 April 1997	2	"Ready or Not"	The Course	5	19 April 1997	1
19 April 1997	7	"You Might Need Somebody"	Shola Ama	4	17 May 1997	1
19 April 1997	1	"MFEO"	Kavana	8	19 April 1997	1
19 April 1997	1	"Lazy"	Suede	9	19 April 1997	1
19 April 1997	1	"Halo"	Texas	10	19 April 1997	1
26 April 1997	2	"Old Before I Die"	Robbie Williams	2	26 April 1997	1
26 April 1997	1	"Staring at the Sun"	U2	3	26 April 1997	1
26 April 1997	1	"Around the World"	Daft Punk	5	26 April 1997	1
26 April 1997	2	"Don't Leave Me"	Blackstreet	6	26 April 1997	1
26 April 1997	1	"You Showed Me"	The Lightning Seeds	8	26 April 1997	1
26 April 1997	1	"Reverence"	Faithless	10	26 April 1997	1
3 May 1997	2	"Blood on the Dance Floor"	Michael Jackson	1	3 May 1997	1
3 May 1997	2	"Bodyshakin'"	911	3	3 May 1997	1
3 May 1997	6	"Lovefool" ^{[H]}	The Cardigans	2	17 May 1997	1
3 May 1997	1	"Drop Dead Gorgeous"	Republica	7	3 May 1997	1
3 May 1997	1	"Hypnotize" ^{[I]}	The Notorious B.I.G.	10	3 May 1997	1
10 May 1997	2	"Love Won't Wait"	Gary Barlow	1	10 May 1997	1
10 May 1997	1	"Star People '97"	George Michael	2	10 May 1997	1
10 May 1997	1	"Love Is the Law"	The Seahorses	3	10 May 1997	1
10 May 1997	1	"Alright"	Jamiroquai	6	10 May 1997	1
17 May 1997	4	"You're Not Alone"	Olive	1	17 May 1997	2
17 May 1997	3	"Wonderful Tonight"	Damage	3	17 May 1997	1
17 May 1997	1	"I'm a Man Not a Boy"	North & South	7	17 May 1997	1
17 May 1997	1	"Kowalski"	Primal Scream	8	17 May 1997	1
17 May 1997	1	"Susan's House"	Eels	9	17 May 1997	1
24 May 1997	5	"Time to Say Goodbye"	Sarah Brightman & Andrea Bocelli	2	24 May 1997	2
24 May 1997	2	"Love Shine a Light" ^{[J]}	Katrina and the Waves	3	24 May 1997	1
24 May 1997	1	"Please Don't Go"	No Mercy	4	24 May 1997	1
24 May 1997	1	"I Don't Want To"	Toni Braxton	9	24 May 1997	1
31 May 1997	7	"I Wanna Be the Only One"	Eternal featuring BeBe Winans	1	31 May 1997	1
31 May 1997	4	"Closer than Close"	Rosie Gaines	4	31 May 1997	1
31 May 1997	2	"I'll Be There for You" ^{[K]}	The Rembrandts	5	31 May 1997	1
7 June 1997	6	"MMMBop"	Hanson	1	7 June 1997	3
7 June 1997	2	"Paranoid Android"	Radiohead	3	7 June 1997	1
7 June 1997	2	"6 Underground" ^{[L]}	Sneaker Pimps	9	7 June 1997	1
7 June 1997	1	"Waltz Away Dreaming"	Toby Bourke & George Michael	10	7 June 1997	1
14 June 1997	1	"Midnight in Chelsea"	Jon Bon Jovi	4	14 June 1997	1
14 June 1997	8	"Free"	Ultra Naté	4	21 June 1997	1
14 June 1997	1	"Love Rollercoaster"	Red Hot Chili Peppers	7	14 June 1997	1
14 June 1997	4	"Coco Jamboo"	Mr. President	8	14 June 1997	2
14 June 1997	1	"The End Is the Beginning Is the End"	The Smashing Pumpkins	10	14 June 1997	1
21 June 1997	1	"How High"	The Charlatans	6	21 June 1997	1
21 June 1997	1	"Hard to Say I'm Sorry"	Az Yet featuring Peter Cetera	7	21 June 1997	1
21 June 1997	1	"I'll Be"	Foxy Brown featuring Jay-Z	9	21 June 1997	1
21 June 1997	1	"Sun Hits the Sky"	Supergrass	10	21 June 1997	1
28 June 1997	12	"I'll Be Missing You" (#3) ^{[M]}	Puff Daddy & Faith Evans featuring 112	1	28 June 1997	6
28 June 1997	3	"Bitter Sweet Symphony" ^{[N]}	The Verve	2	28 June 1997	1
28 June 1997	1	"Hundred Mile High City"	Ocean Colour Scene	4	28 June 1997	1
28 June 1997	1	"On Your Own"	Blur	5	28 June 1997	1
28 June 1997	1	"Nothing Lasts Forever"	Echo & the Bunnymen	8	28 June 1997	1
28 June 1997	1	"Guiding Star"	Cast	9	28 June 1997	1
5 July 1997	4	"Ecuador"	Sash! featuring Rodriguez	2	5 July 1997	2
5 July 1997	2	"Just a Girl" ^{[O]}	No Doubt	3	5 July 1997	1
5 July 1997	1	"Ain't Nobody"	The Course	8	5 July 1997	1
5 July 1997	1	"Somewhere"	Pet Shop Boys	9	5 July 1997	1
12 July 1997	1	"The Journey"	911	3	12 July 1997	1
12 July 1997	1	"Something Goin' On (In Your Soul)"	Todd Terry presents Martha Wash & Jocelyn Brown	5	12 July 1997	1
12 July 1997	1	"A Change Would Do You Good"	Sheryl Crow	8	12 July 1997	1
19 July 1997	4	"D'You Know What I Mean?"	Oasis	1	19 July 1997	1
19 July 1997	6	"C U When U Get There"	Coolio featuring 40 Thevz	3	19 July 1997	1
19 July 1997	8	"Freed from Desire"	Gala	2	9 August 1997	1
19 July 1997	2	"HIStory"/"Ghosts"	Michael Jackson	5	19 July 1997	1
19 July 1997	1	"Piece of My Heart"	Shaggy featuring Marsha	7	19 July 1997	1
19 July 1997	1	"Gotham City"	R. Kelly	9	19 July 1997	1
19 July 1997	1	"How Come, How Long"	Babyface featuring Stevie Wonder	10	19 July 1997	1
26 July 1997	1	"Blinded by the Sun"	The Seahorses	7	26 July 1997	1
26 July 1997	1	"Lazy Days"	Robbie Williams	8	26 July 1997	1
26 July 1997	1	"G.H.E.T.T.O.U.T."	Changing Faces	10	26 July 1997	1
2 August 1997	3	"Picture of You"	Boyzone	2	2 August 1997	1
2 August 1997	5	"Everybody (Backstreet's Back)"	Backstreet Boys	3	2 August 1997	1
2 August 1997	4	"Bitch" ^{[P]}	Meredith Brooks	6	2 August 1997	1
2 August 1997	1	"California Dreamin'" ^{[Q]}	The Mamas & the Papas	9	2 August 1997	1
2 August 1997	1	"Last Night on Earth"	U2	10	2 August 1997	1
9 August 1997	1	"All About Us"	Peter Andre	3	9 August 1997	1
9 August 1997	1	"Black Eyed Boy"	Texas	5	9 August 1997	1
9 August 1997	4	"Mo Money Mo Problems" ^{[R]}	The Notorious B.I.G. featuring Mase & Puff Daddy	6	9 August 1997	1
16 August 1997	9	"Men in Black" (#6)	Will Smith	1	16 August 1997	4
16 August 1997	1	"Yesterday"	Wet Wet Wet	4	16 August 1997	1
16 August 1997	1	"Everything"	Mary J. Blige	6	16 August 1997	1
23 August 1997	11	"Tubthumping" (#10)	Chumbawamba	2	23 August 1997	3
23 August 1997	2	"All I Wanna Do"	Dannii Minogue	4	23 August 1997	1
23 August 1997	1	"Filmstar"	Suede	9	23 August 1997	1
30 August 1997	1	"You're the One I Love"	Shola Ama	3	30 August 1997	1
30 August 1997	3	"Never Gonna Let You Go" ^{[S]}	Tina Moore	7	30 August 1997	1
30 August 1997	1	"Queen of New Orleans"	Jon Bon Jovi	10	30 August 1997	1
6 September 1997	2	"Honey"	Mariah Carey	3	6 September 1997	1
6 September 1997	3	"I Know Where It's At"	All Saints	4	6 September 1997	1
6 September 1997	1	"Travellers Tune"	Ocean Colour Scene	5	6 September 1997	1
6 September 1997	1	"Free"	DJ Quicksilver	7	6 September 1997	1
6 September 1997	1	"Karma Police"	Radiohead	8	6 September 1997	1
6 September 1997	1	"When Doves Cry"	Ginuwine	10	6 September 1997	1
13 September 1997	4	"The Drugs Don't Work"	The Verve	1	13 September 1997	1
13 September 1997	2	"Where's the Love"	Hanson	4	13 September 1997	1
13 September 1997	1	"Live the Dream"	Cast	7	13 September 1997	1
13 September 1997	1	"Even After All"	Finley Quaye	10	13 September 1997	1
20 September 1997	13	"Something About the Way You Look Tonight"/"Candle in the Wind 1997" (#1) ^{[T]}^{[U]}	Elton John	1	20 September 1997	5
20 September 1997	2	"You Have Been Loved"	George Michael	2	20 September 1997	1
20 September 1997	2	"María"	Ricky Martin	6	20 September 1997	1
20 September 1997	1	"All Mine"	Portishead	8	20 September 1997	1
20 September 1997	1	"4 Seasons of Loneliness"	Boyz II Men	10	20 September 1997	1
27 September 1997	7	"Sunchyme"	Dario G	2	27 September 1997	2
27 September 1997	1	"Fix"	Blackstreet	7	27 September 1997	1
27 September 1997	1	"Samba de Janeiro"	Bellini	8	27 September 1997	1
4 October 1997	2	"Stand By Me"	Oasis	2	4 October 1997	1
4 October 1997	2	"Arms Around the World"	Louise	4	4 October 1997	1
4 October 1997	3	"Got 'til It's Gone"	Janet Jackson featuring Q-Tip & Joni Mitchell	6	4 October 1997	1
4 October 1997	1	"Please"	U2	7	4 October 1997	1
4 October 1997	1	"Just for You"	M People	8	4 October 1997	1
11 October 1997	5	"As Long As You Love Me"	Backstreet Boys	3	11 October 1997	1
11 October 1997	3	"Angel of Mine"	Eternal	4	11 October 1997	1
11 October 1997	2	"Raincloud"	Lighthouse Family	6	11 October 1997	1
18 October 1997	5	"Stay"	Sash! featuring La Trec	2	18 October 1997	1
18 October 1997	1	"On Her Majesty's Secret Service" ^{[V]}	Propellerheads with David Arnold	7	18 October 1997	1
18 October 1997	1	"Closed for Business"	Mansun	10	18 October 1997	1
25 October 1997	5	"Spice Up Your Life" (#9)	Spice Girls	1	25 October 1997	1
25 October 1997	12	"Barbie Girl" (#2)	Aqua	1	1 November 1997	4
25 October 1997	1	"You've Got a Friend"	The Brand New Heavies	9	25 October 1997	1
25 October 1997	1	"A Life Less Ordinary"	Ash	10	25 October 1997	1
1 November 1997	1	"Party People...Friday Night"	911	5	1 November 1997	1
1 November 1997	2	"Da Ya Think I'm Sexy?"	N-Trance featuring Rod Stewart	7	1 November 1997	1
1 November 1997	1	"Phenomenon"	LL Cool J	9	1 November 1997	1
8 November 1997	11	"Torn" (#8)	Natalie Imbruglia	2	8 November 1997	3
8 November 1997	1	"Lonely"	Peter Andre	6	8 November 1997	1
8 November 1997	1	"All You Good Good People"	Embrace	8	8 November 1997	1
15 November 1997	4	"Tell Him"	Barbra Streisand & Celine Dion	3	15 November 1997	1
15 November 1997	1	"Choose Life"	PF Project featuring Ewan McGregor	6	15 November 1997	1
15 November 1997	1	"Open Road"	Gary Barlow	7	15 November 1997	1
15 November 1997	1	"James Bond Theme"	Moby	8	15 November 1997	1
15 November 1997	1	"Put Your Arms Around Me"	Texas	10	15 November 1997	1
22 November 1997	15	"Never Ever" ♦	All Saints	1	17 January 1998	1
22 November 1997	1	"I Will Come to You"	Hanson	5	22 November 1997	1
22 November 1997	1	"You Sexy Thing" ^{[W]}	Hot Chocolate	6	22 November 1997	1
22 November 1997	1	"Help the Aged"	Pulp	8	22 November 1997	1
22 November 1997	1	"Better Day"	Ocean Colour Scene	9	22 November 1997	1
29 November 1997	9	"Perfect Day" (#4) ^{[X]}	Various artists ^{[Y]}	1	29 November 1997	3
29 November 1997	4	"Wind Beneath My Wings"	Steven Houghton	3	29 November 1997	1
29 November 1997	2	"Ain't That Just the Way"	Lutricia McNeal	6	29 November 1997	1
29 November 1997	1	"Smack My Bitch Up"	The Prodigy	8	29 November 1997	1
29 November 1997	1	"Crush on You"	Aaron Carter	9	29 November 1997	1
29 November 1997	1	"Let's Go Round Again"	Louise	10	29 November 1997	1
6 December 1997	5	"Baby Can I Hold You"/"Shooting Star"	Boyzone	2	6 December 1997	1
6 December 1997	1	"Lucky Man"	The Verve	7	6 December 1997	1
13 December 1997	5	"Teletubbies say 'Eh-oh!'" (#5) ^{[Z]}	Teletubbies	1	13 December 1997	2
13 December 1997	10	"Together Again"	Janet Jackson	4	13 December 1997	2
13 December 1997	12	"Angels" ♦	Robbie Williams	4	21 February 1998	1
13 December 1997	1	"Slam Dunk (Da Funk)"	Five	10	13 December 1997	1
27 December 1997	4	"Too Much"	Spice Girls	1	27 December 1997	2
27 December 1997	1	"Feel So Good"	Mase	10	27 December 1997	1

== Entries by artist ==
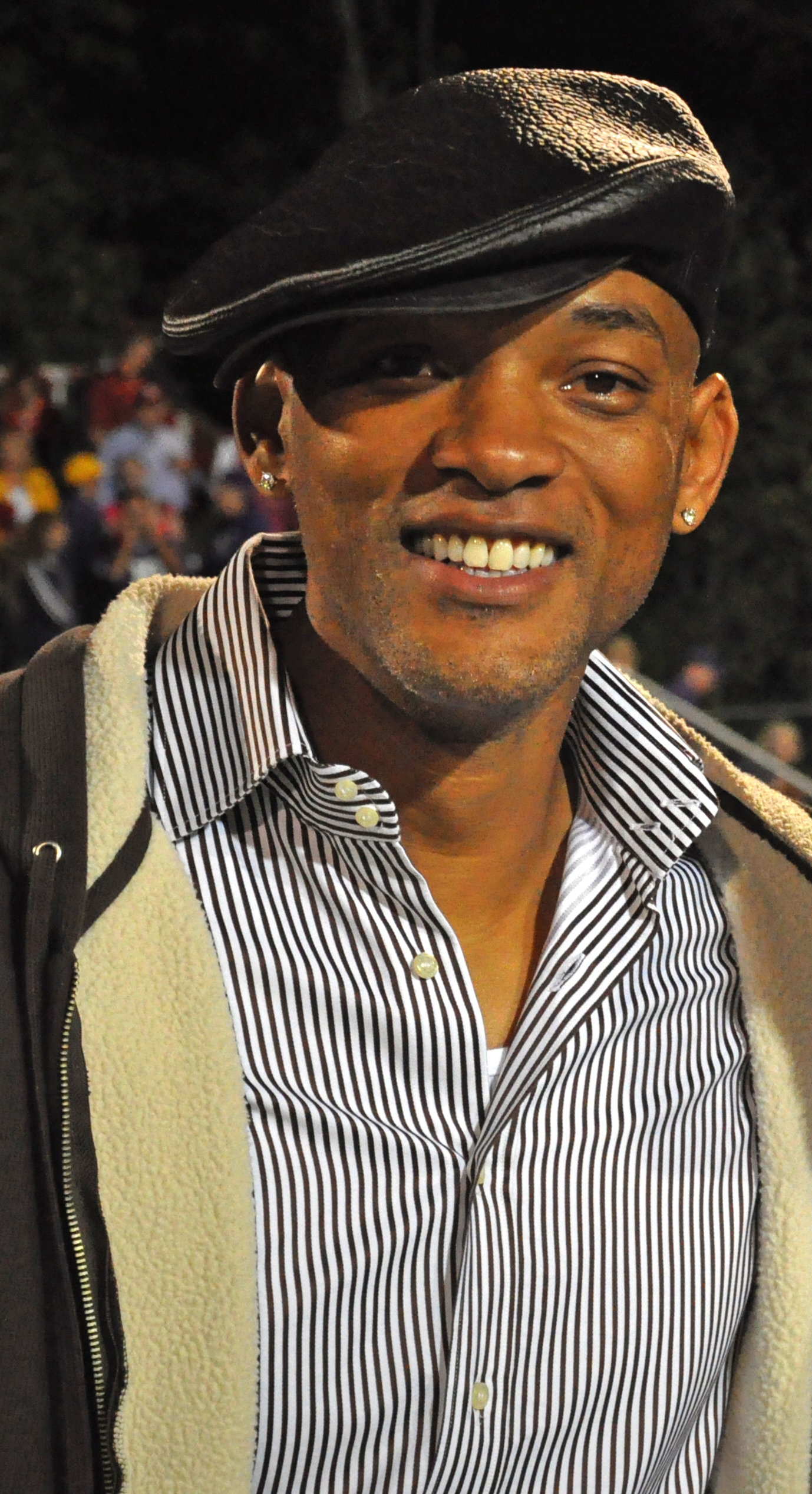
Will Smith (pictured in 2009) spent four weeks at number-one with the song "Men in Black", which featured on the soundtrack of the film of the same name.

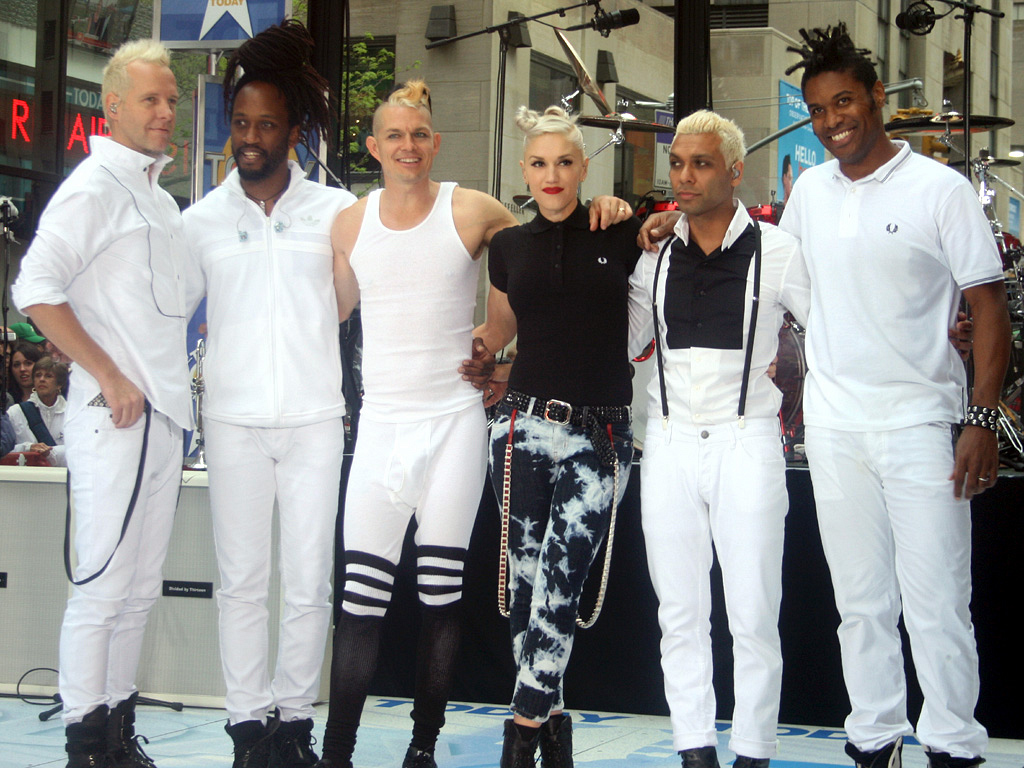
No Doubt, fronted by Gwen Stefani (pictured third from right), had two top 10 hits in the UK this year, including "Don't Speak", which spent three weeks at number-one and lasted nine weeks in the top 10, becoming the seventh best selling single of the year.

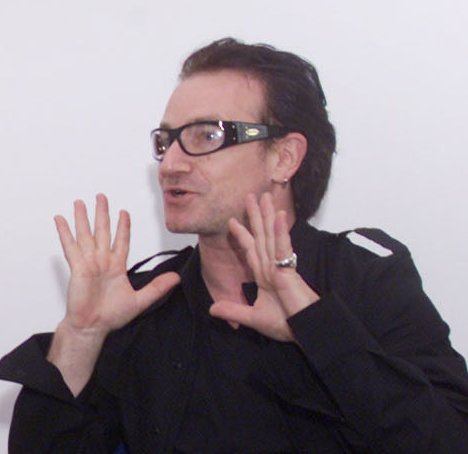
Bono (pictured in 2000) had five top 10 singles in 1997, the joint most with the members of fellow countrymen Boyzone. This included four with his band U2, including the number-one hit "Discothèque" and one on the charity ensemble "Perfect Day", which topped the chart in November.

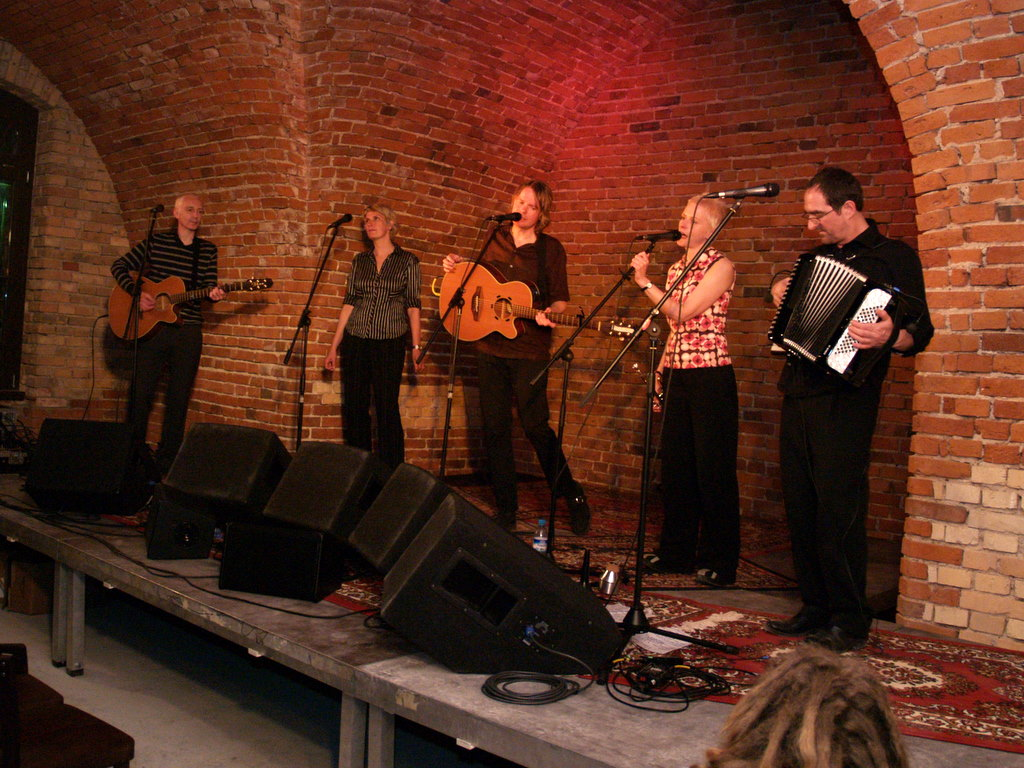
Lancashire band Chumbawamba had one of the year's biggest selling singles, "Tubthumping", which spent three weeks at number two and had an 11-week stay in the top 10.

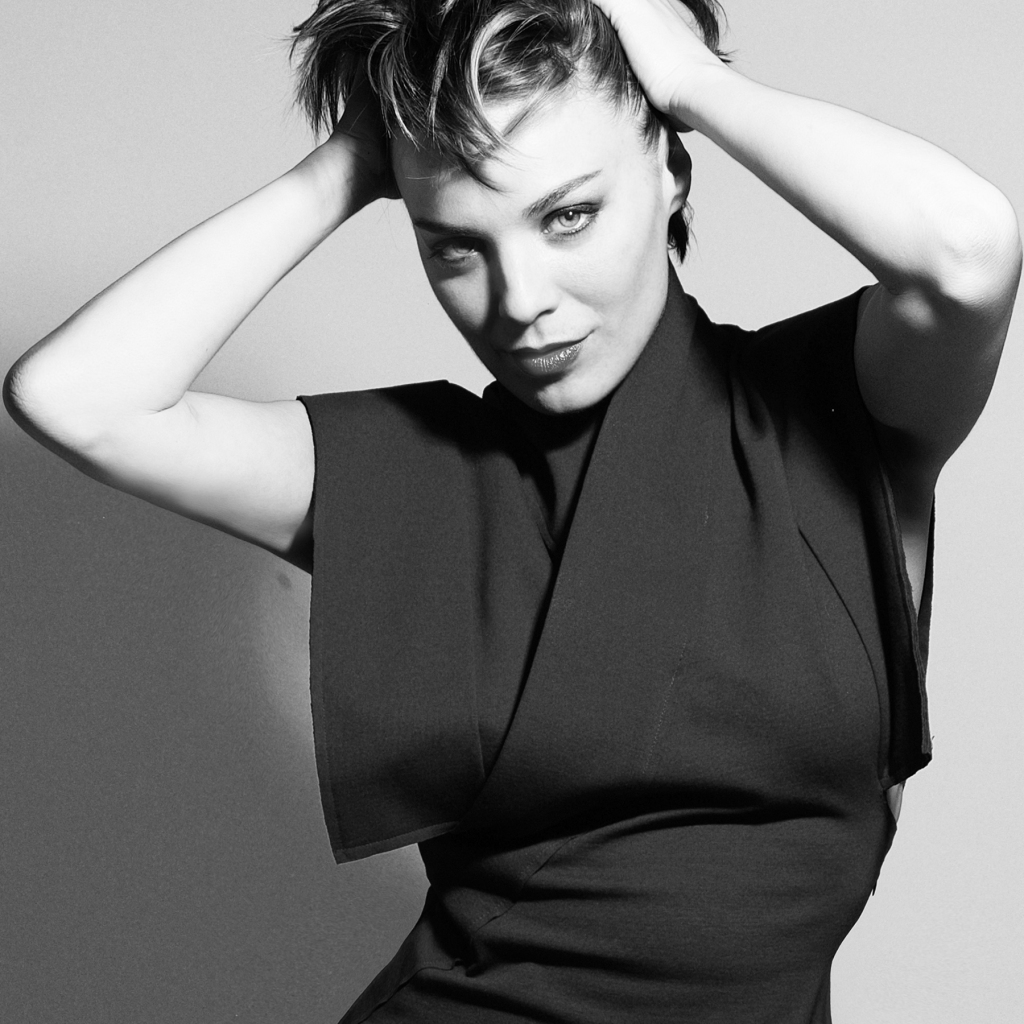
Italian artist Gala spent eight weeks in the UK top 10 this year with her hit single "Freed from Desire", which had its highest position at number two.

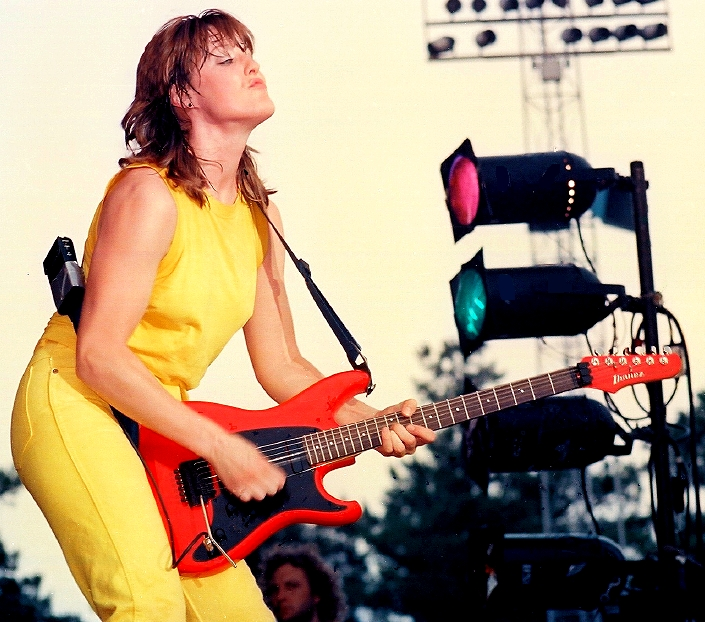
Katrina and the Waves (lead singer Katrina Leskanich pictured in 1986) won the 1997 Eurovision Song Contest with "Love Shine a Light", which reached number three in the UK.

The following table shows artists who achieved two or more top 10 entries in 1997, including singles that reached their peak in 1996 or 1998. The figures include both main artists and featured artists, while appearances on ensemble charity records are also counted for each artist.

Entries	Artist	Weeks	Singles
5	Bono ^{[AA]}^{[BB]}	10	"Discothèque", "Last Night on Earth", "Perfect Day", "Please", "Staring at the Sun"
5	Keith Duffy ^{[AA]}^{[CC]}^{[DD]}	15	"A Different Beat", "Baby Can I Hold You"/"Shooting Star", "Isn't It a Wonder", "Perfect Day", "Picture of You"
5	Michael Graham ^{[AA]}^{[CC]}^{[DD]}	15	"A Different Beat", "Baby Can I Hold You"/"Shooting Star", "Isn't It a Wonder", "Perfect Day", "Picture of You"
5	Ronan Keating ^{[AA]}^{[CC]}^{[DD]}	15	"A Different Beat", "Baby Can I Hold You"/"Shooting Star", "Isn't It a Wonder", "Perfect Day", "Picture of You"
5	Shane Lynch ^{[AA]}^{[CC]}^{[DD]}	15	"A Different Beat", "Baby Can I Hold You"/"Shooting Star", "Isn't It a Wonder", "Perfect Day", "Picture of You"
5	Stephen Gately ^{[AA]}^{[CC]}^{[DD]}	15	"A Different Beat", "Baby Can I Hold You"/"Shooting Star", "Isn't It a Wonder", "Perfect Day", "Picture of You"
4	911	6	"Bodyshakin'", "Party People...Friday Night", "The Day We Find Love", "The Journey"
4	Backstreet Boys	13	"Anywhere for You", "As Long as You Love Me", "Everybody (Backstreet's Back)", "Quit Playing Games (with My Heart)"
4	Boyzone ^{[CC]}	10	"A Different Beat", "Baby Can I Hold You"/"Shooting Star", "Isn't It a Wonder", "Picture of You"
4	Brett Anderson ^{[AA]}^{[EE]}	8	"Filmstar", "Lazy", "Perfect Day", "Saturday Night"
4	George Michael	5	"Older"/"I Can't Make You Love Me", "Star People '97", "Waltz Away Dreaming", "You Have Been Loved"/"The Strangest Thing '97"
4	Spice Girls ^{[CC]}	14	"2 Become 1", "Mama"/"Who Do You Think You Are", "Spice Up Your Life, "Too Much"
4	Texas	7	"Black Eyed Boy", "Halo", "Put Your Arms Around Me", "Say What You Want"
4	U2	5	"Discothèque", "Last Night on Earth", "Please", "Staring at the Sun"
3	Blur	8	"Beetlebum", "On Your Own", "Song 2"
3	Cast	3	"Free Me", "Guiding Star", "Live the Dream"
3	Eternal	12	"Angel of Mine", "Don't You Love Me", "I Wanna Be the Only One"
3	Hanson	9	"I Will Come to You", "MMMBop", "Where's the Love"
3	LL Cool J	4	"Ain't Nobody", "Hit 'Em High (The Monstars' Anthem)", "Phenomenon"
3	Ocean Colour Scene	4	"Better Day", "Hundred Mile High City", "Travellers Tune"
3	Peter Andre	3	"All About Us", "Lonely", "Natural"
3	Robbie Williams ^{[FF]}	6	"Angels", "Lazy Days", "Old Before I Die"
3	Sash!	16	"Ecuador", "Encore une fois", "Stay"
3	Suede	3	"Filmstar", "Lazy", "Saturday Night"
3	The Verve	8	"Bitter Sweet Symphony", "Lucky Man", "The Drugs Don't Work"
2	All Saints ^{[EE]}	9	"I Know Where It's At", "Never Ever"
2	Barbra Streisand	5	"I Finally Found Someone", "Tell Him"
2	Blackstreet	3	"Don't Leave Me", "Fix"
2	Celine Dion ^{[CC]}	5	"All by Myself", "Tell Him"
2	The Charlatans	2	"How High", "North Country Boy"
2	Coolio	7	"C U When U Get There", "Hit 'Em High (The Monstars' Anthem)"
2	The Course	3	"Ain't Nobody", "Ready or Not"
2	Daft Punk	2	"Around the World", "Da Funk"/"Musique"
2	Damage	4	"Love Guaranteed", "Wonderful Tonight"
2	Depeche Mode	2	"Barrel of a Gun", "It's No Good"
2	DJ Quicksilver	9	"Bellissima", "Free"
2	Eels	2	"Novocaine for the Soul", "Susan's House"
2	Elton John ^{[AA]}	18	"Something About the Way You Look Tonight"/"Candle in the Wind 1997", "Perfect Day"
2	Gabrielle ^{[AA]}	6	"Perfect Day", "Walk On By"
2	Gary Barlow	3	"Love Won't Wait", "Open Road"
2	Ian Broudie ^{[AA]}	6	"Perfect Day", "You Showed Me"
2	Jon Bon Jovi	2	"Midnight in Chelsea", "Queen of New Orleans"
2	Janet Jackson	6	"Got 'til It's Gone", "Together Again"
2	Kavana	2	"I Can Make You Feel Good", "MFEO"
2	Lisa Stansfield	3	"People Hold On", "The Real Thing"
2	Louise	3	"Arms Around the World", "Let's Go Round Again"
2	Madonna ^{[CC]}		"Another Suitcase in Another Hall", "Don't Cry for Me Argentina"
2	Mansun	2	"Closed for Business", "She Makes My Nose Bleed"
2	Mark Morrison ^{[CC]}	3	"Horny", "Moan and Groan"
2	Michael Jackson	4	"Blood on the Dance Floor", "HIStory"/"Ghosts"
2	No Doubt	11	"Don't Speak", "Just a Girl"
2	No Mercy	10	"Please Don't Go", "Where Do You Go"
2	The Notorious B.I.G.	5	"Hypnotize", "Mo Money Mo Problems"
2	Oasis	6	"D'You Know What I Mean?", "Stand by Me"
2	Orbital	2	"Satan Live", "The Saint"
2	Pet Shop Boys	2	"A Red Letter Day", "Somewhere"
2	The Prodigy ^{[CC]}	3	"Breathe", "Smack My Bitch Up"
2	R. Kelly	11	"Gotham City", "I Believe I Can Fly"
2	Radiohead	3	"Karma Police", "Paranoid Android"
2	The Seahorses	2	"Blinded by the Sun", "Love is the Law"
2	Shola Ama	8	"You Might Need Somebody", "You're the One I Love"
2	Supergrass	2	"Richard III", "Sun Hits the Sky"
2	Toni Braxton ^{[CC]}	4	"I Don't Want To", "Un-Break My Heart"
2	Wet Wet Wet	2	"If I Never See You Again", "Yesterday"

== Notes ==
- ^{a} "Never Ever" reached its peak of number-one on 17 January 1998 (week ending).
- ^{b} "Professional Widow (It's Got to Be Big)" originally peaked at number 20 upon its initial release in 1996. It was remixed by Armand van Helden and re-released in 1997, reaching number-one in January.
- ^{c} "Remember Me" re-entered the top 10 at number 8 on 15 February 1997 (week ending).
- ^{d} The original solo version of "You Got the Love" by Candi Staton peaked at number 95 in 1986. The 1991 remix by The Source peaked at number 4.
- ^{e} The original version of "Show Me Love" peaked at number 6 upon its release in 1993.
- ^{f} "Bellissima" charted as a double A-side single with another song, "I Have a Dream", across Europe in 1996 but only "Bellissima" reached the UK chart.
- ^{g} Makaveli was a stage name used by American rapper Tupac Shakur (sometimes known alternatively as 2Pac).
- ^{h} "Lovefool" originally peaked outside the top ten at number 21 upon its initial release in September 1996.
- ^{i} "Hypnotize" was the last single released by The Notorious B.I.G. before his death.
- ^{j} "Love Shine a Light" was the United Kingdom's winning entry at the Eurovision Song Contest in 1997.
- ^{k} "I'll Be There for You" was the theme song from the television series Friends. It originally peaked at number 3 upon its initial release in 1995.
- ^{l} "6 Underground" originally peaked outside the top ten at number 15 upon its initial release in October 1996.
- ^{m} "I'll Be Missing You" was recorded as a tribute to The Notorious B.I.G. after he was shot dead. It featured his wife Faith Evans alongside Puff Daddy and R&B group 112 and included a sample of "Every Breath You Take" by The Police.
- ^{n} "Bitter Sweet Symphony" uses a sample of "The Last Time" by The Rolling Stones. It was the subject of a legal challenge regarding plagiarism, and as a result Mick Jagger and Keith Richards had subsequent songwriting credits added.
- ^{o} "Just a Girl" originally peaked outside the top ten at number 38 upon its initial release October 1996.
- ^{p} "Bitch" was sometimes known by its censored title "Nothing in Between".
- ^{q} "California Dreamin' originally peaked outside the top ten at number 23 upon its initial release in 1966.
- ^{r} "Mo Money Mo Problems" was the first single released since The Notorious B.I.G.'s tragic death, and charted posthumously at number six.
- ^{s} "Never Gonna Let You Go" re-entered the top 10 at number 9 on 13 September 1997 (week ending), and at number 9 on 27 September 1997 (week ending).
- ^{t} "Candle in the Wind 1997" was released as a tribute to Diana, Princess of Wales who died in 1997.
- ^{u} "Something About the Way You Look Tonight"/"Candle in the Wind 1997" re-entered the top 10 at number 10 on 6 December 1997 (week ending), at number 10 on 20 December 1997 (week ending) and at number 10 on 3 January 1998 (week ending).
- ^{v} "On Her Majesty's Secret Service" was remixed by Propellerheads for the Shaken and Stirred: The David Arnold James Bond Project, an album of cover versions of James Bond theme songs.
- ^{w} "You Sexy Thing" originally peaked at number 2 upon its initial release in 1975. A Ben Liebrand remix of the song was released in 1987 and peaked at number 10. In 1997, the original version of "You Sexy Thing" was re-released after it featured in the successful comedy film The Full Monty. This re-release peaked at number 6.
- ^{x} Released as the official single for Children in Need.
- ^{y} "Perfect Day" was credited to Various artists which included Lou Reed, David Bowie, Tom Jones and Boyzone.
- ^{z} "Teletubbies Say "Eh-oh"" was a remix of the theme tune from the Teletubbies children's television series. It spent two weeks at number-one in December but narrowly lost out to "Too Much" by Spice Girls for the Christmas number-one.
- ^{aa} Figure includes an appearance on the "Perfect Day" charity single.
- ^{bb} Figure includes four top 10 hits with the group U2.
- ^{cc} Figure includes single that peaked in 1996.
- ^{dd} Figure includes four top 10 hits with the group Boyzone.
- ^{ee} Figure includes three top 10 hits with the group Suede.
- ^{ff} Figure includes single that peaked in 1998.

== See also ==
- 1997 in British music
- List of UK singles chart number ones of the 1990s
