= It's a Beautiful Thing (Ocean Colour Scene song) =

Single by Ocean Colour Scene with P. P. Arnold

from the album Marchin' Already
- B-side: "Mariners Way, Going Nowhere For A While, Expensive Chair"
- Released: 16 February 1998
- Genre: Britpop
- Length: 6:30
- Label: MCA
- Songwriter: Ocean Colour Scene
- Producer: Brendan Lynch

Ocean Colour Scene singles chronology
| "Better Day" (1997) | "It's a Beautiful Thing" (1998) | "(How Does It Feel to Be) On Top of the World" (1998) |

"It's a Beautiful Thing" is a rock song by Ocean Colour Scene with P. P. Arnold.

The song was released in 1998 and reached number 12 in the UK Singles Chart. It is taken from their 1997 chart-topping album Marchin' Already and was the fourth and final single to be released from the album, following "Hundred Mile High City", "Travellers Tune" and "Better Day". By not reaching the Top 10, the song broke the chain formed by the previous six singles which had all reached the Top 10. The band have never reached the Top 10 since.

The lyrics are understood to be about Simon Fowler's (aka Sonny's) personal difficulties in coming out as gay. The title is a reference to the 1993 play and 1996 film Beautiful Thing. Love is the "beautiful thing", but Fowler also laments that it can be a "terrible thing".

P. P. Arnold already guested on OCS' previous single "Travellers Tune".

== Track listing ==
1. "It's a Beautiful Thing"
2. "Mariners Way"
3. "Going Nowhere for a While"
4. "Expensive Chair"
