= Marchin' Already =

Studio album by Ocean Colour Scene
- Released: 15 September 1997
- Studios: Moseley Shoals (Birmingham, England)
- Genres: Britpop; blues rock
- Length: 48:28
- Labels: Island (UK); MCA (US)
- Producers: Brendan Lynch, Martyn "Max" Heyes, Ocean Colour Scene

Ocean Colour Scene chronology
Moseley Shoals (1996)	Marchin' Already (1997)	One from the Modern (1999)

Professional ratings
Review scores
Source	Rating
AllMusic	4.5/5 stars
The Guardian	1/5 stars
The List	2/5 stars
NME	6/10
Select	2/5
Uncut	3/5 stars
Vox	2/5 stars

Marchin' Already is the third album by Ocean Colour Scene.

The album was a follow-up to the successful Moseley Shoals, and is in a similar style. The songs were taken from the band's catalogue that they had built up since forming several years earlier.

== Background ==
The single "Hundred Mile High City" was used in the film Lock, Stock and Two Smoking Barrels. P.P. Arnold appears on "Traveller's Tune" and "It's a Beautiful Thing". A more subdued version of "Traveller's Tune" originally appeared as a B-side to "The Day We Caught the Train".

The album knocked Oasis' Be Here Now off the top spot in the UK Albums Chart—Noel Gallagher sent Ocean Colour Scene his congratulations through a plaque on which he had inscribed, "To The Second Best Band In Britain". Steve Cradock famously retorted "it's an honour to be described as Britain's second best band, ahead of Oasis but behind the Beatles".

In 2007 the song "Get Blown Away" was covered by British indie band The Enemy as a B-side to their single "It's Not OK", albeit just a piano and vocal version.

On 4 February 2014, Marchin' Already was reissued as a two disc deluxe version, with the second disc containing B-sides from previous singles. There is also a three disc/one DVD super deluxe version with added demos and radio sessions on Disc 2 and a live concert from the Marchin' Already tour from the Manchester Apollo on 22 February 1998, with the original released VHS of their concert from Stirling Castle making up the DVD release.

== Track listing ==
1. "Hundred Mile High City" – 3:58
2. "Better Day" – 3:45
3. "Travellers Tune" – 3:41
4. "Big Star" – 3:12
5. "Debris Road" – 3:09
6. "Besides Yourself" – 3:14
7. "Get Blown Away" – 4:43
8. "Tele He's Not Talking" – 3:01
9. "Foxy's Folk Faced" – 2:10
10. "All Up" – 2:49
11. "Spark and Cindy" – 4:00
12. "Half a Dream Away" – 4:22
13. "It's a Beautiful Thing" – 6:31

=== 2014 deluxe version ===
Disc 1 – regular 13-track album

Disc 2:

1. "Falling to the Floor" – 3:58
2. "The Face Smiles Back Easily" – 3:24
3. "Hello Monday" – 3:43
4. "Song for the Front Row" – 3:03
5. "On the Way Home" – 2:24
6. "All God's Children Need Travelling Shoes" – 3:31
7. "The Best Bet on Chinaski" – 2:51
8. "On and On" – 2:15
9. "Mariners Way" – 3:20
10. "Going Nowhere for a While" – 3:34
11. "Expensive Chair" – 3:46
12. "Song of a Baker" – 3:15

=== 2014 super deluxe version ===
Disc 1 per deluxe edition

Disc 2 (B-sides):

1. "Falling to the Floor" – 3:58
2. "The Face Smiles Back Easily" – 3:24
3. "Hello Monday" – 3:43
4. "Song for the Front Row" – 3:03
5. "On the Way Home" – 2:24
6. "All God's Children Need Travelling Shoes" – 3:31
7. "The Best Bet on Chinaski" – 2:51
8. "On and On" – 2:15
9. "Mariners Way" – 3:20
10. "Going Nowhere for a While" – 3:34
11. "Expensive Chair" – 3:46
12. "Song of a Baker" – 3:15

Radio Sessions:

1. "Song for the Front Row" (acoustic)
2. "Debris Road" (acoustic)
3. "Travellers Tune" (acoustic)
4. "Hundred Mile High City"
5. "Travellers Tune"
6. "Spark and Cindy"

Demos:

1. "Blown Away"
2. "Hello Monday"
3. "Expensive Chair"
4. "It's a Beautiful Thing"

Disc 3: Live at Manchester Apollo 22/2/98

1. "Hundred Mile High City"
2. "Better Day"
3. "Travellers Tune" (Ocean Colour Scene, P.P. Arnold)
4. "Lining Your Pockets"
5. "One for the Road"
6. "The Circle"
7. "You've Got It Bad"
8. "40 past Midnight"
9. "It's My Shadow"
10. "The Riverboat Song"
11. "Get Blown Away"
12. "Debris Road"
13. "The Day We Caught the Train"
14. "Get Away"
15. "Foxy's Folk Faced"
16. "I Wanna Stay Alive with You"
17. "It's a Beautiful Thing" (Ocean Colour Scene, P.P. Arnold)
18. "Song of a Baker" (Ocean Colour Scene, P.P. Arnold)

Disc 4: Travellers Tunes: Live at Stirling Castle (DVD)

1. "Hundred Mile High City"
2. "Better Day"
3. "Travellers Tune"
4. "Blown Away"
5. "The Circle"
6. "Besides Yourself"
7. "This Understanding"
8. "The Riverboat Song"
9. "Debris Road"
10. "Lining Your Pockets"
11. "The Day We Caught the Train"
12. "One for the Road"
13. "It's My Shadow"
14. "You've Got It Bad"
15. "Get Away"
16. "Robin Hood"
17. "I Wanna Stay Alive with You"
18. "Day Tripper"

== Personnel ==
- Simon Fowler – vocals, guitar, harmonica
- Steve Craddock – guitar, piano
- Damon Minchella – bass
- Oscar Harrison – drums
- PP Arnold – additional vocals (tracks 3, 13)
- Rico Rodriguez – trombone (track 12)

== Charts ==
=== Weekly charts ===
Chart (1997)	Peak position
Dutch Albums (Album Top 100)	93
Scottish Albums (Official Charts)	1
Swedish Albums (Sverigetopplistan)	60
UK Albums (Official Charts)	1

=== Year-end charts ===
Chart (1997)	Position
UK Albums (OCC)	31
