= Tom Lowe (performer) =

Background information
- Born: Thomas Peter Lowe; 23 April 1978 (age 48); Stockport, England
- Origin: Boston, Massachusetts, United States; Los Angeles, California
- Genres: Pop
- Occupations: Singer; actor
- Instruments: Vocals, keyboards, piano, clarinet, saxophone
- Years active: 1995—present

Thomas Peter Lowe (born 23 April 1978), known professionally as Tom Lowe, is an English singer and actor.

== Personal life ==
Tom Lowe was born in Stockport, England to Peter and Margaret Lowe. He grew up in the village of Mellor, on the outskirts of Stockport. He attended Mellor Primary School from 1982 to 1989 and Manchester Grammar School from 1989 to 1996, where he performed in many school plays. He sang in the church choir of St. Thomas's Mellor during his childhood and was runner up in the UK wide Choirboy of the Year competition while a chorister there. He also appeared on TV while at Primary school with fellow Mellor pupils on the children's show Umbrella, filmed at BBC Manchester.

== UK career ==
=== Early career ===
Lowe had a stint as a Take That backing singer during their 1995 UK tour. He was part of the male voice choir, named 'The Wanted Men', who sang behind the group in the encore, and specifically during the Number One hit single at that time "Never Forget".

=== North and South ===
He first rose to fame just out of school, as a member of the teenage boy band North and South, along with Lee Otter, James Hurst and Sam Chapman. Lowe played keyboard, saxophone, and sang vocals. The band starred in the BAFTA nominated hit BBC TV series No Sweat, for which Lowe composed the soundtrack at the age of eighteen.

=== West End career ===
Lowe starred in the London West End award-winning productions of Les Misérables and Cats in the leading roles of "Marius Pontmercy" and "The Rum Tum Tugger". He also originated the role of "Billy" in the West End workshop of Boy George's musical, Taboo.

== Career in United States ==
=== Harvard ===
A 2005 graduate of Harvard University, Lowe majored in East Asian Studies, and speaks fluent Mandarin along with four other languages. His ties to the emergent Chinese market are credited to numerous visits to China, many of them sponsored by the Chinese government.

Lowe is the Harvard cultural attaché to the Shaolin Temple, responsible for training top Chinese film celebrities such as Jet Li. His fellowship at Harvard enabled him to spend four months traveling the ancient Silk Road through Xinjiang and Gansu provinces in northwest and central China, as an editor for the best selling student travel guide Let's Go. His Harvard thesis on Tang Dynasty frontier poetry won him an honors degree and was contributed to the Harvard Yenching Library following Magna Cum Laude recognition.

During his Harvard career, Lowe continued to perform his original material as the lead singer of the band Tommy and The Tigers. The band had the honor of playing at CBGBs, the original New York City hardcore and punk rock club, in 2005. Also during his career, he was selected to sing in Harvard's premier co-ed a cappella group, the Harvard-Radcliffe Veritones, where he was a featured tenor for two years. His vocals can be found on their fourth album, Imprudence. Staying on in Boston in 2006, Lowe was chosen to be the face of Massachusetts, the on-camera host for a webseries of international tourism promotional videos under Tourism Massachusetts. He became the first ever non-American to sing the national anthem at a Boston Red Sox game.

=== American Idol ===
Lowe became the first non-US citizen to appear on American Idol when he auditioned for American Idol's sixth season in Seattle. During Hollywood Week's group round, Lowe sang "How Deep Is Your Love" together with Blake Lewis, Rudy Cardenas and Chris Sligh, to move forward to the top tier of contestants. His encounter with 'Idol' and X Factor has proved to be a source for 'Runner-Up', a new Broadway musical he is co-writing, centered on a fictitious reality show. His rendition of "God Bless America" at The LA Dodgers stadium was broadcast on television to an audience of millions.

=== Musical theatre ===
Lowe performed in a major production of Les Misérables at the Hollywood Bowl, on 8–10 August 2008, this time playing the rebel hero role of Enjolras.

In April - May 2009, he starred in Back to Bacharach and David at the Henry Fonda Music Box Theatre, Hollywood.

In 2010, he opened Vegas! The Show at the Saxe Theater, Planet Hollywood Casino and Resort Las Vegas. As lead singer he paid homage to Sinatra, Elvis, Tom Jones and Elton John.

Tom was honoured in 2013 to perform "Empty Chairs At Empty Tables" for Les Mis lyricist Alain Boublil at the ASCAP Film and Television Music Awards

His original album Back to Mine, available on Spotify, iTunes and Amazon, features a collection of original songs in Mandarin, Portuguese, Spanish, French and English.

=== Real Life: The Musical ===
Lowe is the host of the reality television show, Real Life: The Musical, which debuted on the Oprah Winfrey Network on 9 June 2012.
