= All That I Need =

1998 single by Boyzone

Single by Boyzone

from the album Where We Belong
- B-side: "Never Easy"; "Paradise"
- Released: 20 April 1998
- Studio: The Loft (Bronxville, New York)
- Length: 3:40
- Label: Polydor
- Songwriters: Evan Rogers; Carl Sturken
- Producers: Carl Sturken; Evan Rogers

Boyzone singles chronology
"Baby Can I Hold You" / "Shooting Star" (1997)	"All That I Need" (1998)	"No Matter What" (1998)

Music video
- "All That I Need" on YouTube

"All That I Need" is the third single from Irish boy band Boyzone's third studio album, Where We Belong (1998). It was written and produced by Carl Sturken and Evan Rogers with remix and additional production by Rude Boy, Andy Bradfield, Trevor Steel, and John Holliday. This made it their first original single release not to be co-written by any members of the group.

The song reached No. 1 in the UK Singles Chart in April 1998, selling 200,000 copies in the UK and earning a silver sales certification. Outside the UK, "All That I Need" reached No. 1 in Ireland and Taiwan and No. 7 in Sweden.

== Critical reception ==
A reviewer from Music Week noted that the band "move ever further from Osmonds covers territory to adult respectability. 'All That I Need', containing a notably sensitive vocal from Ronan Keating, is the first evidence of a more mature sound for their forthcoming album Where We Belong, due out at the end of this month. A well-crafted ballad, the single last week climbed into the Airplay Top 20 as radio's fastest-growing track and should have little trouble becoming the group's 11th consecutive top five hit at the very least."

== Track listings ==
- UK CD1
1. "All That I Need" (7-inch edit)
2. "Never Easy"
3. "Paradise"
4. "Workin' My Way Back to You" (featuring Alliage)
- UK CD2
1. "All That I Need" (7-inch edit)
2. "All That I Need" (Piz Danuk mix)
3. "All That I Need" (Trouser Enthusiasts Darkest Day Dub No Sex Mix)
4. "All That I Need" (Piz Danuk instrumental)
- UK cassette single
1. "All That I Need" (7-inch edit)
2. "Never Easy"

== Credits and personnel ==
Credits are lifted from the By Request album booklet.

Studio

- Recorded at The Loft (Bronxville, New York)

Personnel

- Evan Rogers – writing, additional background vocals, production, arrangement
- Carl Sturken – writing, all other instruments, production, arrangement
- John Holliday – Spanish guitar, additional production, programming
- Danny G – keyboard
- Colleen Reynolds – production management
- Andrea Derby – production assistant
- Andy Bradfield – remix
- Rude Boy – remix and additional production
- Trevor Steel – additional production, programming
- Al Hemberger – recording

== Charts ==
=== Weekly charts ===
Chart (1998)	Peak position
Australia (ARIA)	102
Belgium (Ultratop 50 Flanders)	49
Estonia (Eesti Top 20)	18
Europe (Eurochart Hot 100)	7
Europe (European Hit Radio)	6
France (SNEP)	91
Germany (GfK)	51
Greece (IFPI Greece)	4
Iceland (Íslenski Listinn Topp 40)	17
Ireland (IRMA)	1
Latvia (Latvijas Top 20)	17
Netherlands (Dutch Top 40)	30
Netherlands (Single Top 100)	38
Scottish Singles Sales (Official Charts)	1
Spain Airplay (Top 40 Radio)	31
Sweden (Sverigetopplistan)	7
Switzerland (Schweizer Hitparade)	36
Taiwan (IFPI)	1
UK Singles (Official Charts)	1
UK Airplay (Music Week)	3

=== Year-end charts ===
Chart (1998)	Position
Sweden (Hitlistan)	91
UK Singles (OCC)	80

== Certifications ==
Region	Certification	Certified units/sales
United Kingdom (BPI)	Silver	200,000^{^}
^{^} Shipments figures based on certification alone.
