= Where We Belong (album) =

Studio album by Boyzone
- Released: 25 May 1998
- Recorded: 1997–1998
- Genre: Pop
- Length: 62:39
- Label: Polydor
- Producers: Absolute, Jon Douglas, Rude Boy, Andy Bradfield, Franglen & Lupino, Ray Hedges, John Holliday, David Kreuger, Stephen Lipson, Steve Mac, Per Magnusson, Rose & Foster, Evan Rogers, Jim Steinman, Trevor Steel, Carl Sturken, Andrew Lloyd Webber, Nigel Wright

Boyzone chronology
A Different Beat (1996)	Where We Belong (1998)	By Request (1999)

Singles from Where We Belong
- 1. "Picture of You" Released: 21 July 1997; 2. "Te Garder Près De Moi" Released: 21 October 1997 (France only); 3. "Baby Can I Hold You" / "Shooting Star" Released: 24 November 1997; 4. "All That I Need" Released: 20 April 1998; 5. "No Matter What" Released: 3 August 1998; 6. "All the Time in the World" Released: 5 October 1998 (US only); 7. "I Love the Way You Love Me" Released: 23 November 1998

Where We Belong is the third studio album by Irish boy band Boyzone. The album was released on 25 May 1998 by Polydor Records. Five singles were released from the album, including a cover version of "I Love the Way You Love Me". The album became a top 10 album in eleven countries. It was the group's second album to be released in the United States, where it charted at number 167 on the Billboard 200. Where We Belong is also the third and final studio album Boyzone released before the death of Stephen Gately, 11 years later.

== Background and release ==
Like their first two albums, much of the original material for the album was written or co-written by the band members themselves. In 1998, Ronan Keating was awarded the Ivor Novello Award for "Picture of You", which was featured as the main theme song from the film Bean: The Ultimate Disaster Movie (1997).

Where We Belong album was released on 25 May 1998 in the United Kingdom by Polydor Records. It topped the UK Albums Chart on the week of 6 June 1998. Five singles were released from the album: "Picture of You", "Baby Can I Hold You", "All That I Need", "No Matter What" and "I Love the Way You Love Me", with the addition of the French-language single "Te Garder Pres De Moi", which was released and included on the album exclusively in France. The original British issue of the album did not contain "No Matter What" or "I Love the Way You Love Me" - these were included on a later pressing, issued on 10 November 1998. The following week, the album was released in the United States on 17 November 1998 by Ravenous Records, a label set up by Jim Steinman under Mercury Records. The US edition included three new songs; "I'll Never Not Need You", "Walk On (So They Told Me)", and "All the Time in the World". "All the Time in the World" was released as the album's first single in the US on 5 October 1998. "No Matter What" was featured on the US edition of the soundtrack to the 1999 film Notting Hill, and was released to American radio on 10 May 1999.

Although "Picture of You" is included on the album in both the United States and Australia, it was released as a single from A Different Beat in those regions, as the release of A Different Beat occurred there after the release of "Picture of You" in the United Kingdom. The American edition of the album includes three new tracks that were not released in Britain until the release of By Request in 1999. Although "Shooting Star" was released as a double A-side with "Baby Can I Hold You" in most territories, it only appeared as a bonus track on the album in Japan. The album is also the third and final studio album that the group released before the death of Stephen Gately eleven years later.

== B-sides ==
Several B-sides were issued to the singles taken from the album. The original track "I've Got You", co-written by Graham, Hedges and Brannigan, was released alongside "Picture of You", which also included a Spanish-language version of "Words", an extended mix of its title track, and the band's Eurovision promotional single, "Let the Message Run Free", which was also released as a promotional single with cans of Pepsi. The Japanese-only bonus track "Shooting Star" was issued as the B-side to "Baby Can I Hold You", alongside the band's version of "Mystical Experience", formerly only released in America, as well as a remix of the said track, the Spanish-language version of "Words" and the classic B-side "From Here to Eternity". The Japanese-only bonus track "Never Easy" was issued as the B-side to "All That I Need, alongside A Different Beat opener "Paradise", a French-language version of "Working My Way Back to You" included as a bonus track from the album in France, and remixes of the title track by Piz Danuk and Trouser Enthusiasts. The brand new track "Where Have You Been", co-written by Duffy, Hedges and Brannigan, was released alongside "No Matter What", accompanied by a remix of "All That I Need" by Phil Da Costa, the Japanese-only bonus track "She's the One" co-written by Keating, an interview with the band, and the band's former hit singles "Father and Son" and "Words". Finally, the brand new track "Waiting for You", co-written by Gately, was issued as the B-side to "I Love the Way You Love Me", alongside "Let the Message Run Free", a live version of "No Matter What" from Wembley, and a medley of songs from the musical Grease.

== Commercial performance ==
The album topped the UK Albums Chart for three weeks in 1998, on 6 June, 5 September and 12 September respectively, making it their first album to spend more than a week at number one. The album was the third best selling album of 1998 in the United Kingdom. The album was certified as 5× Platinum in the UK and sold 3 million copies worldwide.

== Track listing ==
Standard edition
No.	Title	Writer(s)	Producer(s)	Length
1.	"Picture of You" (lead vocals: Keating)	Andy Watkins, Paul Wilson, Eliot Kennedy, Ronan Keating	Absolute	3:30
2.	"Baby Can I Hold You" (lead vocals: Keating)	Tracy Chapman	Stephen Lipson	3:15
3.	"All That I Need" (lead vocals: Keating)	Evan Rogers, Carl Sturken	Sturken, Rogers, Rude Boy^{[a]}, Andy Bradfield^{[a]}, Trevor Steel^{[b]}, John Holliday^{[b]}	3:42
4.	"Must Have Been High" (lead vocals: Keating, Gately)	Eric Foster White	Lipson	3:27
5.	"And I" (lead vocals: Keating)	Steve Mac, Wayne Hector, Ali Tennant	Mac	4:03
6.	"That's How Love Goes" (lead vocals: Keating)	Keating, Julian Gallagher, Steve Booker	Lipson	3:58
7.	"Where Did You Go?" (lead vocals: Gately)	Stephen Gately, Mac, Hector, Tennant	Mac	4:42
8.	"I'm Learning (Part One)" (lead vocals: Keating)	Keating, Ray Hedges, Martin Brannigan	Hedges	3:43
9.	"One Kiss at a Time" (lead vocals: Keating)	Keating, Rogers, Sturken	Sturken, Rogers	4:06
10.	"While the World Is Going Crazy" (lead vocals: Keating)	Keating, Rogers, Sturken	Sturken, Rogers	5:10
11.	"This Is Where I Belong" (lead vocals: Keating)	Keating, Rogers, Sturken	Sturken, Rogers	5:29
12.	"Will Be Yours" (lead vocals: Keating, Gately)	David Kreuger, Per Magnusson, Jörgen Elofsson, Pete James	Kreuger, Magnusson	3:39
13.	"Good Conversation" (lead vocals: Graham)	Mikey Graham, Mac, Hector	Mac	3:56
14.	"You Flew Away" (lead vocals: Gately)	Gately	Jon Douglas	4:25
15.	"I'm Learning (Part Two)" (lead vocals: Keating)	Keating, Hedges, Brannigan	Hedges	5:34

Re-issue bonus tracks
No.	Title	Writer(s)	Producer(s)	Length
16.	"No Matter What" (lead vocals: Gately, Keating)	Andrew Lloyd Webber, Jim Steinman	Steinman, Webber, Nigel Wright, Franglen & Lupino^{[b]}	4:32
17.	"I Love the Way You Love Me" (lead vocals: Keating, Gately)	Victoria Shaw, Chuck Cannon	Rose & Foster	4:06

Japanese bonus tracks
No.	Title	Writer(s)	Producer(s)	Length
16.	"Never Easy"	Keating, Hedges, Brannigan	Hedges	4:02
17.	"She's the One"	Keating, Hedges, Brannigan	Hedges	2:59
18.	"Shooting Star"	Alan Menken, David Zippel	Wright	4:13

Chinese edition bonus content
No.	Title	Length
16.	"All That I Need" (video)	3:42
17.	"Baby Can I Hold You" (video)	3:15
18.	"Picture of You" (video)	3:28

French edition
No.	Title	Writer(s)	Producer(s)	Length
1.	"Picture of You"	Ronan Keating, Nigel Kennedy, Paul Watkins, Paul Wilson	Absolute	3:30
2.	"Baby Can I Hold You" (7'' edit)	Tracy Chapman	Stephen Lipson	3:15
3.	"Te Garder Près De Moi" (featuring Alliage)	Sandy Linzer, Denny Randell	Steve Mac	3:58
4.	"All That I Need" (7'' edit)	Evan Rogers, Carl Sturken	Sturken, Rogers, Rude Boy^{[a]}, Andy Bradfield^{[a]}, Trevor Steel^{[b]}, John Holliday^{[b]}	3:42
5.	"Must Have Been High"	Eric Foster White	Lipson	3:27
6.	"And I"	Mac, Wayne Hector, Ali Tennant	Mac	4:03
7.	"That's How Love Goes"	Keating, Julian Gallagher, Steve Booker	Lipson	3:58
8.	"Where Did You Go"	Stephen Gately, Mac, Hector, Tennant	Mac	4:42
9.	"I'm Learning (Part One)"	Keating, Ray Hedges, Martin Brannigan	Hedges	3:43
10.	"One Kiss at a Time"	Keating, Rogers, Sturken	Sturken, Rogers	4:06
11.	"While the World Is Going Crazy"	Keating, Rogers, Sturken	Sturken, Rogers	5:10
12.	"This Is Where I Belong"	Keating, Rogers, Sturken	Sturken, Rogers	5:29
13.	"Will Be Yours"	David Kreuger, Per Magnusson, Jörgen Elofsson, Pete James	Kreuger, Magnusson	3:39
14.	"Good Conversation"	Mikey Graham, Mac, Hector	Mac	3:56
15.	"You Flew Away"	Gately	Jon Douglas	4:25
16.	"I'm Learning (Part Two)"	Keating, Hedges, Brannigan	Hedges	5:34

North American edition
No.	Title	Writer(s)	Producer(s)	Length
1.	"I'll Never Not Need You"	Diane Warren	Mike Mangini, Mark Hudson^{[c]}	4:13
2.	"Walk On (So They Told Me)"	Steven Greenberg, Mark Hudson	Mangini, Hudson^{[c]}	3:28
3.	"All the Time in the World"	Desmond Child, Damon Robbins, Victoria Stephenson	Mangini, Hudson^{[c]}	4:15
4.	"No Matter What"	Andrew Lloyd Webber, Jim Steinman, Nigel Wright	Steinman, Webber, Wright, Franglen & Lupino^{[b]}	4:36
5.	"Picture of You"	Andy Watkins, Paul Wilson, Eliot Kennedy, Ronan Keating	Absolute	3:28
6.	"Baby Can I Hold You"	Tracy Chapman	Stephen Lipson	3:16
7.	"All That I Need"	Evan Rogers, Carl Sturken	Sturken, Rogers, Rude Boy^{[a]}, Andy Bradfield^{[a]}, Trevor Steel^{[b]}, John Holliday^{[b]}	3:44
8.	"One Kiss at a Time"	Keating, Rogers, Sturken	Sturken, Rogers	4:05
9.	"And I"	Steve Mac, Wayne Hector, Ali Tennant	Mac	4:02
10.	"That's How Love Goes"	Keating, Julian Gallagher, Steve Booker	Lipson	3:51
11.	"Where Did You Go"	Stephen Gately, Mac, Hector, Tennant	Mac	4:39
12.	"Will Be Yours"	David Kreuger, Per Magnusson, Jörgen Elofsson, Pete James	Kreuger, Magnusson	3:37
13.	"Must Have Been High"	Eric Foster White	Lipson	3:25
14.	"You Flew Away"	Gately	Jon Douglas	4:22
15.	"I Love the Way You Love Me"	Victoria Shaw, Chuck Cannon	Mac	3:45

Notes

- ^{^[a]} signifies a remixer
- ^{^[b]} signifies an additional producer
- ^{^[c]} signifies a vocal producer

== Charts ==
=== Weekly charts ===
Chart (1998–99)	Peak position
Australian Albums (ARIA)	31
Austrian Albums (Ö3 Austria)	40
Belgian Albums (Ultratop Flanders)	7
Belgian Albums (Ultratop Wallonia)	39
Danish Albums (Tracklisten)	2
Dutch Albums (Album Top 100)	1
Estonian Albums (Eesti Top 10)	2
European Albums Chart	5
Finnish Albums (Suomen virallinen lista)	13
French Albums (SNEP)	35
German Albums (Offizielle Top 100)	14
Greek Albums (IFPI Greece)	9
Icelandic Albums (Tónlist)	4
Irish Albums (IRMA)	1
Italian Albums (FIMI)	21
Japanese Albums (Oricon)	90
Malaysian Albums (IFPI)	3
New Zealand Albums (RMNZ)	1
Norwegian Albums (VG-lista)	1
Scottish Albums (Official Charts)	1
Singapore Albums (SPVA)	1
Swedish Albums (Sverigetopplistan)	8
Swiss Albums (Schweizer Hitparade)	8
Taiwanese Albums (IFPI)	1
UK Albums (Official Charts)	1
US Billboard 200	167
Zimbabwean Albums (ZIMA)	1

=== Year-end charts ===
Chart (1998)	Peak position
Belgian Albums (Ultratop Flanders)	18
Dutch Albums (Album Top 100)	14
European Albums (Eurochart Hot 100)	25
New Zealand Albums (RMNZ)	12
Norwegian Albums (VG Lista)	1
Swedish Albums (Sverigetopplistan)	43
UK Albums (OCC)	3
Chart (1999)	Peak position
Belgian Albums (Ultratop Flanders)	88
Dutch Albums (Album Top 100)	40
European Albums (Eurochart Hot 100)	42
German Albums (Offizielle Top 100)	87
New Zealand Albums (RMNZ)	17
UK Albums (OCC)	46

=== End of decade charts ===
Chart (1990–1999)	Position
UK Albums Chart	35

== Certifications and sales ==
Certifications for Where We Belong
Region	Certification	Certified units/sales
Australia (ARIA)	Gold	35,000^{^}
Austria (IFPI Austria)	Gold	25,000^{*}
Belgium (BRMA)	Gold	25,000^{*}
Denmark (IFPI Danmark)	2× Platinum	100,000^{^}
Germany (BVMI)	Gold	250,000^{^}
Netherlands (NVPI)	Platinum	100,000^{^}
New Zealand (RMNZ)	Platinum	15,000^{^}
Norway (IFPI Norway)	2× Platinum	122,000
Sweden (GLF)	Platinum	80,000^{^}
Switzerland (IFPI Switzerland)	Gold	25,000^{^}
United Kingdom (BPI)	5× Platinum	1,500,000^{^}
Summaries
Europe (IFPI)	2× Platinum	2,000,000^{*}
^{*} Sales figures based on certification alone.^{^} Shipments figures based on certification alone.

== Album credits ==
- Boyzone - Vocals, main performer
- Robbie McIntosh - Guitar
- Mike Mangini - Guitar, drum programming, producer
- James McMillan - Guitar, programming, keyboards
- Dominic Miller - Guitar
- Heff Moraes - Engineer, mixing
- Richard Niles - Arranger
- Denniz Pop - Executive Producer
- Andy Richards - Keyboards, programming
- Steve Rinkoff - Mixing
- Rudeboy - Remixing
- Robin Sellars - Mixing
- Trevor Steel - Programming, producer
- Carl Sturken - Arranger, producer
- Ren Swan - Engineer
- John Themis - Guitar
- Warren Wiebe - Vocals (background)
- Nigel Wright - Keyboards, producer
- Paul Wright - Engineer
- DJ Nastee - Guitar
- Nick Foster - Producer
- Ben Foster - Arranger
- Jeremy Wheatley - Mixing
- David Kreuger - Producer
- Eric Liljestrand - Digital editing
- Mauricio Iragorri - Mixing
- Jack Hersca - Assistant Engineer
- Fred Carlson - Guitar
- Andy Gallimore - Engineer
- Sharon Kearney - Assistant Engineer
- Jon Douglas - Producer
- Steve Mac - Piano, mixing, arranger
- Per Magnusson - Vocals (background), producer
- Alan Chez - Trumpet
- Al Hemberger - Engineer
- Baron Raymonde - Saxophone
- Tim Willis - Assistant Engineer
- Ben Allen - Guitar, Assistant Engineer
- John R. Angier - Keyboards
- Dan Vickers - Assistant Engineer
- Andrea Derby - Production Assistant
- Chris Laws - Drums, engineer, programming
- Angela Lupino - Bass, arranger
- Mark Antony - Vocals (background)
- Jamie Hart - Assistant Engineer
- Skoti-Alain Elliot - Bass, Engineer
- Keith LeBlanc - Drums
- Jim Steinman - Producer, Executive Producer
- Michael Thompson - Guitar (acoustic), Guitar (electric)
- Evan Rogers - Arranger, producer, vocals (background)
- Tom Lord-Alge - Mixing
- Chris Blair - Mastering
- Steve Booker - Keyboards
- Andy Bradfield - Remixing
- Danny G. - Keyboards
- Andy Duncan - Drums
- Rick Essig - Mastering
- Simon Franglen - Arranger, mixing, keyboards
- Paul Gendler - Guitar (acoustic)
- Scott Gordon - Engineer
- Mike Rose - Keyboards
- Mick Guzauski - Arranger
- John Holliday - Producer, Spanish guitar
- Mark Hudson - Arranger, producer
- Nick Ingman - Orchestration
- Luís Jardim - Percussion
- Stephen Lipson - Guitar, producer, mandolin
- Andrew Lloyd Webber - Producer, Executive Producer
