= DJ Quicksilver =

German-Turkish musician

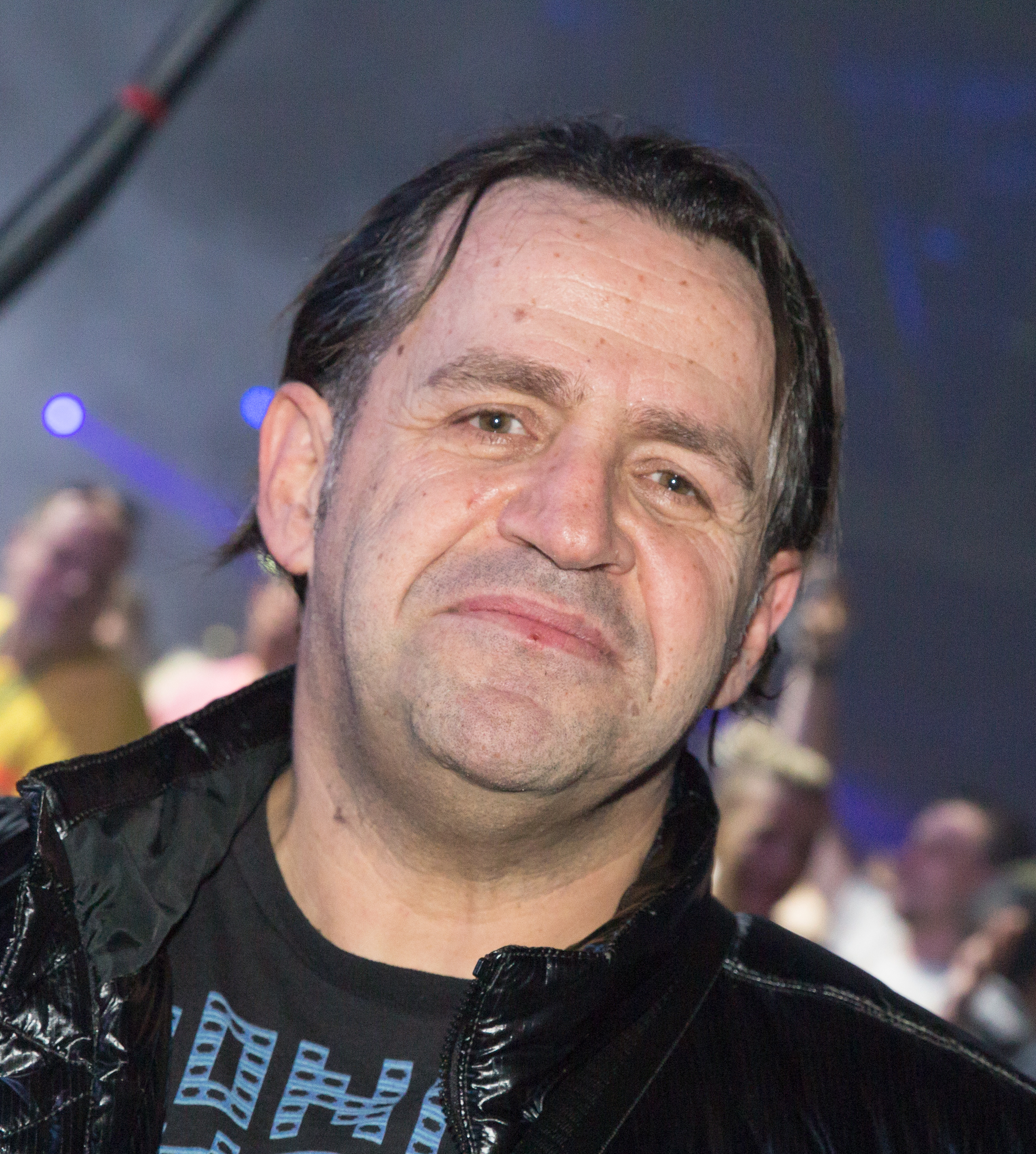

Background information
- Also known as: Watergate
- Born: Orhan Terzi; June 28, 1964 (age 62); Trabzon, Turkey
- Origin: Hattingen, Germany
- Genres: Techno, house, Eurodance, trance
- Occupations: DJ, music producer
- Years active: 1996-present
- Labels: Avex Trax, Positiva Records, Telstar Records, Edel AG
- Website: dj-quicksilver.com

Orhan Terzi (born 28 June 1964), also known as DJ Quicksilver and Watergate, is a German-Turkish DJ and music producer. The name Quicksilver derives from his days taking part in DJ contests, where a mercury column would gauge audience reaction.

== Early life ==
Terzi was born on 28 June 1964 in Trabzon, Turkey. His family moved to Hattingen, Germany in the late 1960s.

== Career ==
Terzi began working with Tommaso de Donatis on DJ Quicksilver material, and released tracks for record labels including Avex Trax, Positiva Records, Telstar, Edel AG, Alphabet City, and Sub Terranean.

In November 1996, Terzi released "Bellissima". It became a hit on the UK dance charts in 1997 and crossed over into pop, reaching #4 on the UK singles chart. It was certified gold, selling well throughout Europe. Other releases include "Boombastic", which sampled the Shaggy track.

In 1999, under the alias Watergate, Terzi released "Heart of Asia", a remix of "Merry Christmas Mr. Lawrence" (1983) by Ryuichi Sakamoto. The British journalist James Masterton wrote that it was "one of the few dance treatments of a famous song that actually manages to make the original seem almost dull by comparison". Also that year, Watergate released "Maid of Orleans (The Battle II)", a remix of "Joan of Arc (Maid of Orleans)" by OMD. In 2002, Terzi received an ECHO nomination for "Best National Dance Act" for the single "Ameno". Terzi has also remixed tracks by Ian van Dahl, Faithless, and the Verve ("Bittersweet Symphony").

== Discography ==
=== Studio albums ===
- Quicksilver (1997)
- Escape 2 Planet Love (1998)
- Clubfiles (The Album) (2003)

=== Singles ===
Year	Single	Peak chart positions										Certifications (sales thresholds)	Album
Year	Single	AUS	AUT	ESP	GER	IRE	NED	NOR	SUI	SWE	UK	Certifications (sales thresholds)	Album
1995	"Bingo Bongo"	—	14	—	36	—	—	—	—	—	—		Quicksilver
1996	"Boing!"	—	31	—	—	—	—	—	—	—	—		Single only
1996	"I Have a Dream"/"Bellissima"	47	9	3	4	2	70	8	6	16	4	GER: Gold; UK: Gold	Quicksilver
1997	"Free"	—	12	4	4	3	—	9	11	13	7		Quicksilver
1997	"Planet Love"	—	36	—	23	11	32	9	35	46	12		Escape 2 Planet Love
1998	"Escape to Paradise" / "Timerider"	86	—	—	31	—	88	14	—	—	—		Escape 2 Planet Love
1999	"Cosmophobia"	—	—	—	36	—	—	—	83	—	—		Single only
2001	"Bombastic"	—	—	—	27	—	—	—	—	—	—		Clubfiles - The Album
2001	"Ameno"	—	13	12	18	—	26	26	20	—	—		Clubfiles - The Album
2002	"New Life"	—	—	—	56	—	—	—	—	—	—		Clubfiles - The Album
2003	"Rising Up"	—	—	—	—	—	—	—	—	—	—		Clubfiles - The Album
2003	"Always on My Mind" (featuring Base Unique)	—	38	—	44	—	66	—	95	—	—		Singles only
2003	"Clubfiles One"	—	33	—	34	—	—	—	99	—	—		Singles only
"—" denotes releases that did not chart

=== Remixes ===
- Dancemania 1 (Compilation, 1996)
- Club Scene Volume 2 (Compilation, 1997)
- Sonic 1 (Compilation, 2000)
- Equinoxe 4 (Trance cover of Jean Michel Jarre's Equinoxe 4)
