= I Have a Dream / Bellissima =

1996 single by DJ Quicksilver

"I Have a Dream" / "Bellissima"

Single by DJ Quicksilver

from the album Quicksilver
- Released: 6 November 1996
- Genre: Trance; house
- Length: 7:19 ("I Have a Dream"); 6:12 ("Bellissima")
- Label: Dos or Die
- Songwriters: Orhan Terzi; Tommaso De Donatis
- Producers: Tommaso De Donatis; Orhan Terzi

DJ Quicksilver singles chronology
"Boing!" (1996)	"I Have a Dream" / "Bellissima" (1996)	"Free" (1997)

Music video
- "I Have a Dream" on YouTube

Music video
- "Bellissima" on YouTube

"I Have a Dream" and "Bellissima" are two tracks by German-Turkish DJ and music producer DJ Quicksilver. The songs were released as a double A-side single in November 1996 from his 1997 album Quicksilver.

The double single "I Have a Dream" / "Bellissima" was DJ Quicksilver's biggest chart success, reaching the top 10 in six countries. It was produced by Tommaso De Donatis and Orhan Terzi (DJ Quicksilver). It is certified gold in Germany and platinum in the United Kingdom.

== Content ==
The song "I Have a Dream" samples Martin Luther King Jr.'s 1963 "I Have a Dream" speech, and uses excerpts of King's voice.

== Critical reception ==
A reviewer from Music Week wrote, "The Turkish-born DJ serves up a floor-packing, monster slice of uplifting house crammed with big beats and teasing drum rolls."

== Music videos ==
The music videos of "I Have a Dream" and "Bellissima" were directed by Volker Hannwacker.

== Impact and legacy ==
In 1998, DJ Magazine ranked "Bellissima" number 98 in their list of "Top 100 Club Tunes". In 2018, Mixmag ranked it among "The 15 Best Mid-90s Trance Tracks". Mixmag editor James Ball wrote, "In 1997 the German-Turkish DJ released 'Bellissima' on the juggernaut imprint Positiva Records. It still stands as one of trance's gooiest tracks, one that is soft at heart yet big in character, its glittery melody offset by thundering drums. Despite this clash, it somehow remains hypnotic and, yes, trancey."

== Charts ==
=== "I Have a Dream" / "Bellissima" ===
Chart (1996–1997)	Peak position
Austria (Ö3 Austria Top 40)	9
Europe (Eurochart Hot 100)	6
Finland (Suomen virallinen lista)	11
Germany (GfK)	4
Netherlands (Single Top 100)	70
Norway (VG-lista)	8
Sweden (Sverigetopplistan)	16
Switzerland (Schweizer Hitparade)	6

=== "I Have a Dream" ===
Chart (1997)	Peak position
Netherlands (Dutch Top 40 Tipparade)	4
Italy (Musica e dischi)	16

=== "Bellissima" ===
Chart (1997)	Peak position
Australia (ARIA)	47
Iceland (Íslenski Listinn Topp 40)	5
Ireland (IRMA)	2
Israel (Israeli Singles Chart)	28
Scottish Singles Sales (Official Charts)	1
UK Singles (Official Charts)	4
UK Dance (Official Charts)	1

=== Year-end charts ===
Chart (1997)	Position
Europe (Eurochart Hot 100)	31
Germany (Media Control)	23
Iceland (Íslenski Listinn Topp 40)	74
Sweden (Topplistan)	83
UK Singles (OCC)	24
UK Club Chart (Music Week)	33

== Certifications ==
Region	Certification	Certified units/sales
Germany (BVMI)	Gold	250,000^{^}
United Kingdom (BPI)	Platinum	600,000^{‡}
^{^} Shipments figures based on certification alone.^{‡} Sales+streaming figures based on certification alone.
