= Picture of You (Boyzone song) =

1997 single by Boyzone

Single by Boyzone

from the album Where We Belong and Bean: The Album
- B-side: "Let the Message Run Free"; "I've Got You"
- Released: 21 July 1997
- Genre: Pop; soul
- Length: 3:28
- Label: Polydor
- Songwriters: Andrew Watkins; Paul Wilson; Eliot Kennedy; Ronan Keating
- Producer: Absolute

Boyzone singles chronology
"Isn't It a Wonder" (1997)	"Picture of You" (1997)	"Baby Can I Hold You" / "Shooting Star" (1997)

Music video
- "Picture of You" on YouTube

"Picture of You" is a song by Irish boy band Boyzone, released in July 1997 by Polydor Records as the first single from their third studio album, Where We Belong (1998). Written by frontman Ronan Keating, Eliot Kennedy, and producers Absolute, the song peaked at No. 2 in both Ireland and the United Kingdom. As of February 2025, it is the group's most-streamed single in the UK, at 36 million streams.

"Picture of You" served as the main theme for the film Bean: The Ultimate Disaster Movie, for which Rowan Atkinson appeared as his character with the band on both the single cover and in the music video. The song's appearance in the film won the Ivor Novello Award for Best Original Song for a Film or Broadcast at the 1998 ceremony. The song was also featured in the 2000 Nickelodeon movie Snow Day and appeared on its soundtrack.

== Critical reception ==
Larry Flick from Billboard magazine wrote, "This videogenic boy group continues in its quest to win the hearts of stateside teens with a cute confection that borrows heavily from the vintage Motown sound of the Temptations and the Four Tops. Unfortunately, their vocals are not nearly as soulful, even though their harmonies are note-perfect. Still, there should certainly be more than a handful of kiddie-driven top 40 stations that will find this track useful. Also, Polydor would be wise to court the mature ears of AC radio listeners, who will get a nostalgic charge out of this 'Picture'." A reviewer from Music Week gave it a score of four out of five, describing it as a "catchy pop/soul song".

== Track listings ==
- UK and European CD1
1. "Picture of You" – 3:28
2. "Let the Message Run Free" – 5:08
3. "Words" (Spanglish version) – 4:02
- UK and European CD2
1. "Picture of You" – 3:28
2. "Picture of You" (extended mix) – 5:54
3. "I've Got You" – 3:45
- UK cassette single
1. "Picture of You" – 3:28
2. "Picture of You" (extended mix) – 5:54
- Japanese CD single
1. "Picture of You"
2. "Let the Message Run Free"
3. "Shooting Star"
4. "Baby Can I Hold You" (7-inch edit)

== Charts ==
=== Weekly charts ===
Chart (1997)	Peak position
Australia (ARIA)	39
Austria (Ö3 Austria Top 40)	23
Belgium (Ultratop 50 Flanders)	30
Belgium (Ultratop 50 Wallonia)	19
Canada (Nielsen SoundScan)	27
Canada CHR/Top 40 (BDS)	26
Estonia (Eesti Top 20)	3
Estonia Airplay (Eesti Top 25)	5
Europe (Eurochart Hot 100)	12
Europe (European Hit Radio)	6
Finland Airplay (Radiosoittolista)	14
France (SNEP)	15
France Airplay (SNEP)	22
Germany (GfK)	32
Greece (IFPI Greece)	5
Iceland (Íslenski Listinn Topp 40)	38
Ireland (IRMA)	2
Israel (Israeli Singles Chart)	6
Italy Airplay (Music & Media)	19
Netherlands (Dutch Top 40)	25
Netherlands (Single Top 100)	27
Poland Airplay (Music & Media)	10
Scottish Singles Sales (Official Charts)	1
Spain Airplay (Top 40 Radio)	36
Sweden (Sverigetopplistan)	22
Switzerland (Schweizer Hitparade)	23
Taiwan (IFPI)	9
UK Singles (Official Charts)	2
UK Airplay (Music Week)	4

=== Year-end charts ===
Chart (1997)	Position
Belgium (Ultratop 50 Wallonia)	95
Europe (European Hit Radio)	25
France (SNEP)	91
Romania (Romanian Top 100)	43
UK Singles (OCC)	48
UK Airplay (Music Week)	26

== Certifications ==
Region	Certification	Certified units/sales
Denmark (IFPI Danmark)	Gold	45,000^{‡}
New Zealand (RMNZ)	Gold	15,000^{‡}
United Kingdom (BPI)	Platinum	600,000^{‡}
^{‡} Sales+streaming figures based on certification alone.

== Release history ==
Region	Date	Format(s)	Label(s)	Ref.
United Kingdom	21 July 1997	CD; cassette	Polydor	
United States	30 September 1997	Rhythmic contemporary radio	Polydor	
Japan	1 March 1998	CD	Polydor	
