= The Course =

Dutch musical group

- Origin: The Netherlands
- Genres: Dance
- Years active: 1996-1997
- Past members: Vincent Hendriks; Dewi Lopulalan; Irma Derby

The Course were a dance music act from the Netherlands. It consisted of DJ/producer Vincent Hendriks and vocalists Dewi Lopulalan and Irma Derby. They achieved their biggest commercial success in 1997.

Hendriks and Lopulalan first met in 1990 at a DJ "mix championship" in the Netherlands. They met again in 1996, at the same venue, and the two decided to collaborate on some music.

The group released their first single, "Ready or Not", a dance cover of the 1996 song by The Fugees, in early 1997, with echoes of other contemporary hits Ultra Flava by Farley & Heller and Hold That Sucker Down by The OT Quartet. It reached #5 in the UK Singles Chart in April, giving the band their first hit. The follow-up, a cover of Chaka Khan and Rufus' "Ain't Nobody" also fared well, reaching #8 in July. However, their third single, "Best Love", only made it to #51 in December. Subsequent singles failed to see chart action, proving The Course to be a "two-hit wonder". They broke up in the late 1990s because of the lack of commercial success after the first two singles.

== Albums ==
Title	Year
The Course - The Expanded Edition	1998

== Singles ==
Title	Year	UK	Netherlands	Sweden	Germany	Switzerland	Belgium
Ready Or Not	1996	5	14	33	27	7	33
Ain't Nobody	1997	8	28	-	-	31	-
Best Love	1997	51	-	-	-	-	-
Ring My Bell feat. Mondane	1998	-	70	-	-	-	-
Miss You feat. Spyte	1998	-	51	-	-	-	-
Night To Remember	1998	-	70	-	-	-	-
