= No Sweat (TV series) =

- Directed by: Alex Kirby
- Starring: James Hurst; Lee Otter; Sam Chapman; Tom Lowe; Harriet Thorpe
- Composers: North and South
- Country of origin: United Kingdom
- Original language: English
- No. of series: 2
- No. of episodes: 18

Production
- Executive producers: Malcolm Gerrie; Christopher Pilkington
- Producers: Esta Charkham; Martyn Day
- Running time: 30 minutes
- Production company: Initial

Original release
- Network: CBBC
- Release: 3 April 1997 – 9 June 1998

No Sweat is a British television children's comedy show that went to air on CBBC in the late 1990s. The show followed the exploits of struggling boy band North & South, consisting of Jimmy (played by James Hurst), Greg (played by Lee Otter), Miles (played by Tom Lowe) and Giles (played by Sam Chapman), who were a group in real life, scoring four United Kingdom top 40 hits between 1997 and 1998 including the No. 7 debut single "I'm a Man Not a Boy" in May 1997.

== Beginnings ==
The band was formed by pop music manager Tom Watkins, whose previous artists included Pet Shop Boys, 2wo Third3, Bros, and East 17. Tom, Lee, and Sam responded to adverts published on Teletext, and guitarist James joined later following a chance meeting with Sam. Mark Read of boyband A1 was originally going to be in the band but later dropped out due to being unsure of the route it was going to take. After being chosen on their musical ability, the band were put through a series of screen tests by Initial Television for the show. After these, they began recording their debut album and filming the first series of the show in Brighton in early 1997.

== First series/Music: 1997 ==
The first series in 1997 was set in Brighton and centred on James Hurst's character, Jimmy Osman, who had just moved into the area with his kind, but overbearing mother, Beverley (played by Harriet Thorpe). Beverley was obsessed with entering competitions, once purchasing multiple cans of dog food despite not having a dog. After making friends with Greg Fuggle at the Peasbody school, and getting past the school bullies Janis (Gemma McCluskie) & Carly (Jessica Meyer), they decided to form a band as a way of getting girls and cash – fast. They initially try to persuade Giles Beamish & Miles Smith-Jones from rival school St Ethelburga's to join this band, and, though reluctant at first, they eventually joined and named themselves North & South.

Midway through the first series, the debut single, "I'm a Man Not a Boy" was released, and reached No. 7 on the UK Singles Chart, ending that year as the 72nd biggest selling single with 102,300 copies sold. It fared even better in Malaysia, reaching No. 2. In August 1997, after the series ended, they released their second single, "Tarantino's New Star", which was anticipated to repeat the success of its predecessor. However, despite a lot of promotion, it only reached No. 18 and disappeared from the UK chart within weeks. Despite this, they went on a sell out tour of the UK in October. The show's theme song, "No Sweat", was also released as a single, and was also used as the theme song for the European version of the PlayStation video game Tombi!.

After the tour, third single "Breathing" was released in November, and again, well promoted, but it only scraped in at No. 27, leaving the charts faster than its predecessor. Things were not looking good for the band, despite a second series of No Sweat being filmed and an album out the following year.

== Series 2 and the end: 1998 ==
In April 1998, the second series started on the BBC, but was met with lower ratings than the first series. In this series, it centred on the band going on tour up and down the UK in a broken down camper van (that on the inside was more like an actual home), reverting to their actual names and being managed by Mickey (played by David Cardy) with Janice & Carly being the band's bodyguards. For their fourth single, a remix of the show's theme tune, entitled "No Sweat '98" was released, but again, it did not do well commercially, peaking at No. 29 and leaving the UK chart rapidly thereafter.

BMG Entertainment decided not to release their much delayed debut album, entitled Allsorts. Shortly after the second series of No Sweat ended, the band split up.

== Post disbandment ==
- James Hurst appeared on Never Mind The Buzzcocks in January 2004 on the "Identity Parade" round.
- Lee Otter changed his name to Lee West and launched a brief solo career in August 2000, supporting Steps on tour. His debut solo single, "Wishing", failed to chart.
- Tom Lowe took lead roles in Les Misérables and Cats in London's West End between 1999 and 2001. He went on to study at Harvard University, graduating in 2005. He auditioned on American Idol season 6, making it through to the Hollywood stage of the competition after a successful first audition but failing to make the final cut after round 3 of the pre-semi final boot camp. He is currently living in the United States.
- Sam Chapman is currently teaching a Music Technology course at a college in Lincolnshire. Since 2016, he has performed at several '80s music themed events on cruise ships for Royal Caribbean, Norwegian and P&O.

== Members ==
- Lee Otter – vocals, acoustic guitar
- James Hurst – vocals, guitar, keyboards
- Tom Lowe – vocals, keyboards, saxophone
- Sam Chapman – vocals, keyboards

== Discography ==
=== Albums ===
- Allsorts (April 1998) – unreleased

=== Singles ===
- "I'm a Man Not a Boy" (May 1997) – UK No. 7
- "Tarantino's New Star" (August 1997) – UK No. 18
- "Breathing" (November 1997) – UK No. 27
- "No Sweat '98" (April 1998) – UK No. 29
