= I'm a Man Not a Boy (North & South song) =

Single by North & South
- Released: May 5, 1997
- Genre: Dance-pop; electronic pop
- Length: 3:22
- Label: RCA
- Songwriter: Tect One
- Producer: Rose & Foster

North & South singles chronology
"I'm a Man Not a Boy" (1997)	"Tarantino's New Star" (1997)

Music video
- "I'm a Man Not a Boy" on YouTube

"I'm a Man Not a Boy" is a song by British boyband North & South, known from the British television children's comedy show No Sweat. It was produced by Rose & Foster and released as their debut single on May 5, 1997 by RCA Records, scoring success on the UK Singles Chart, where it peaked at number seven. The single also reached number six in Scotland and number 92 on the Eurochart Hot 100. Outside Europe, it was a top-10 hit in Israel.

== Critical reception ==
Fiona Parker from The Mirror described the song as "poptastic". Music Week gave the song a top score of five out of five and named it Single of the Week, adding, "A release with so many factors in its favour: it's a storming pop song; the boyband are featuring in the BBC series No Sweat; Tom Watkins is involved; and Tony de Vit has provided club mixes. Watch this soar." A reviewer from Sunday Mirror wrote, "Green-haired boy band currently pulling in two million viewers a week on their Monkees-ish TV show. To be fair, it's a stonking dance tune which recalls Bros at their finest and will no doubt sell by the girl-full, but lads, you won't be men until you start shaving."

== Track listing ==
- CD single, CD1, UK (1997)
1. "I'm a Man Not a Boy" – 3:22
2. "No Sweat" – 3:03
3. "I'm a Man Not a Boy" (Southport Rally Tony De Vit Snt Mix) – 5:56
4. "I'm a Man Not a Boy" (North Shields Anthem Tony De Vit Club 12") – 8:45
- CD single, CD2, UK (1997)
1. "I'm a Man Not a Boy" – 3:24
2. "God Versus North and South" (Exclusive Interview) – 8:43
3. "I'm a Man Not a Boy" (Southend Toon - Tin Tin Out Baby Blue Mix) – 8:03
- CD maxi, Europe (1997)
1. "I'm a Man Not a Boy" – 3:22
2. "I'm a Man Not a Boy" (Southport Rally Tony De Vit Snt Mix) – 3:58
3. "I'm a Man Not a Boy" (North Shields Anthem Tony De Vit Club 12") – 8:45
4. "I'm a Man Not a Boy" (South End Toon Tin Tin Out Baby Blue Mix) – 8:03

== Charts ==
Chart (1997)	Peak position
Europe (Eurochart Hot 100)	92
Israel (IBA)	9
Scotland (OCC)	6
UK Singles (OCC)	7
UK Airplay (Music Week)	24

=== Year-end charts ===
Chart (1997)	Position
Israel (IBA)	95
