= Baby Can I Hold You =

1988 single by Tracy Chapman

Single by Tracy Chapman

from the album Tracy Chapman
- B-side: "Across the Lines"; "If Not Now..."; "Mountains o' Things" (live)
- Released: October 1, 1988
- Genre: Rock; country
- Length: 3:14
- Label: Elektra
- Songwriter: Tracy Chapman
- Producer: David Kershenbaum

Tracy Chapman singles chronology
"Talkin' 'bout a Revolution" (1988)	"Baby Can I Hold You" (1988)	"Crossroads" (1989)
"Wedding Song" (2000)	"Baby Can I Hold You" (2001)	"You're the One" (2002)

Music video
- "Baby Can I Hold You" on YouTube

"Baby Can I Hold You" is a song by American contemporary folk musician Tracy Chapman, released in October 1988 by Elektra Records as the third and final single from her debut album, Tracy Chapman (1988). The song reached the top 50 in the United States, peaking at number 48 on the Billboard Hot 100, and was her last US top-50 hit until 1996's "Give Me One Reason". Worldwide, the song entered the top 40 in Canada and New Zealand, while in Brazil and Portugal, it peaked at number one. Chapman re-released the song in 2001, in support of her first greatest hits album Collection.

== Charts ==
Chart (1988–1990)	Peak position
Australia (ARIA)	68
Brazil (ABPD)	1
Canada Top Singles (RPM)	27
Netherlands (Single Top 100)	89
New Zealand (Recorded Music NZ)	16
Portugal (AFP)	1
UK Singles (Official Charts)	94
US Billboard Hot 100	48
US Adult Contemporary (Billboard)	19

== Certifications ==
Region	Certification	Certified units/sales
Denmark (IFPI Danmark)	Platinum	90,000^{‡}
Italy (FIMI)	Gold	35,000^{‡}
New Zealand (RMNZ)	2× Platinum	60,000^{‡}
Spain (Promusicae)	Gold	30,000^{‡}
United Kingdom (BPI) sales since 2000	Platinum	600,000^{‡}
^{‡} Sales+streaming figures based on certification alone.

== Boyzone version ==
"Baby Can I Hold You"

Single by Boyzone

from the album Where We Belong
- A-side: "Shooting Star"
- B-side: "Mystical Experience"; "From Here to Eternity"
- Released: November 24, 1997
- Studio: Lansdowne (London, England)
- Length: 3:16
- Label: Polydor
- Songwriter: Tracy Chapman
- Producer: Stephen Lipson

Boyzone singles chronology
"Picture of You" (1997)	"Baby Can I Hold You" / "Shooting Star" (1997)	"All That I Need" (1998)

Music video
- "Baby Can I Hold You" on YouTube

In 1997, Irish boy band Boyzone released a cover of "Baby Can I Hold You" as a double A-side with the non-album track "Shooting Star". "Baby Can I Hold You" thus became their second single from their third studio album, Where We Belong (1998). The single, like "Picture of You" before it, peaked at number two on the UK Singles Chart and stayed in the top 75 for 14 weeks. The song was the 26th-best-selling single of 1997 in the United Kingdom and has received a platinum sales certification from the British Phonographic Industry (BPI) for sales and streams of over 600,000 units. The song reappeared on lead singer Ronan Keating's greatest-hits compilation 10 Years of Hits.

=== Critical reception ===
A reviewer from Music Week gave Boyzone's version of "Baby Can I Hold You" three out of five, declaring it as a "teary cover", that "will be a school disco favourite." The magazine's Alan Jones wrote, "Still leading the pack of boy bands, Boyzone are going to have a massive hit with their thoughtful and poignant cover of Baby Can I Hold You Tonight, a fine Tracy Chapman song that somehow never got the attention it deserved. Nicely understated, with Ronan's restrained lead given depth and richness by the pleasing vocal arrangement indulged in by his fellow 'Zoners, and a mandolin." Claudia Connell from News of the World commented, "Few groups do cover songs well-but Boyzone are the exception to the rule. This version (...) is something special and once again proves that few male singers are as hot as Ronan Keating."

=== Track listings ===
- UK CD1
1. "Baby Can I Hold You" (7-inch edit) – 3:16
2. "Shooting Star" – 4:13
3. "Mystical Experience" – 4:10
4. "Mystical Experience" (remix) – 4:36
- UK CD2 (in limited-edition digipak)
1. "Baby Can I Hold You" (7-inch edit) – 3:16
2. "Shooting Star" (radio edit) – 4:11
3. "Words" (Spanglish version) – 4:04
4. "From Here to Eternity" – 3:54
- UK cassette single
1. "Baby Can I Hold You" (7-inch edit) – 3:16
2. "Shooting Star" – 4:11

=== Credits and personnel ===
Credits are lifted from the By Request album booklet.

Studio

- Recorded at Lansdowne Studios (London, England)

Personnel

- Tracy Chapman – writing
- Andy Caine – backing vocals
- Dominic Miller – guitar
- Calum MacColl – guitar
- Stephen Lipson – mandolins, production, programming
- Andy Duncan – drums
- Nick Ingman – orchestration
- Gavyn Wright – concertmaster
- James McMillan – programming
- Heff Moraes – mixing

=== Charts ===
==== Weekly charts ====
Chart (1997–1999)	Peak position
Australia (ARIA)	56
Austria (Ö3 Austria Top 40)	39
Belgium (Ultratop 50 Flanders)	31
Denmark (IFPI)	6
Estonia Airplay (Eesti Top 25)	18
Europe (Eurochart Hot 100)	18
Europe (European Hit Radio)	20
Finland (Suomen virallinen lista)	15
France (SNEP)	26
Germany (GfK)	80
Greece (IFPI Greece)	9
Iceland (Íslenski Listinn Topp 40)	32
Ireland (IRMA)	2
Latvia (Latvijas Top 20)	12
Netherlands (Dutch Top 40)	32
Netherlands (Single Top 100)	43
New Zealand (Recorded Music NZ)	11
Poland Airplay (Music & Media)	9
Scottish Singles Sales (Official Charts)	2
Sweden (Sverigetopplistan)	12
Switzerland (Schweizer Hitparade)	17
UK Singles (Official Charts)	2
UK Airplay (Music Week)	2

==== Year-end charts ====
Chart (1997)	Position
UK Singles (OCC)	26

Chart (1998)	Position
Sweden (Hitlistan)	75
UK Airplay (Music Week)	50

=== Certifications ===
Region	Certification	Certified units/sales
United Kingdom (BPI)	Platinum	600,000^{‡}
^{‡} Sales+streaming figures based on certification alone.

== Andrea Martin version ==
"Baby Can I Hold You"
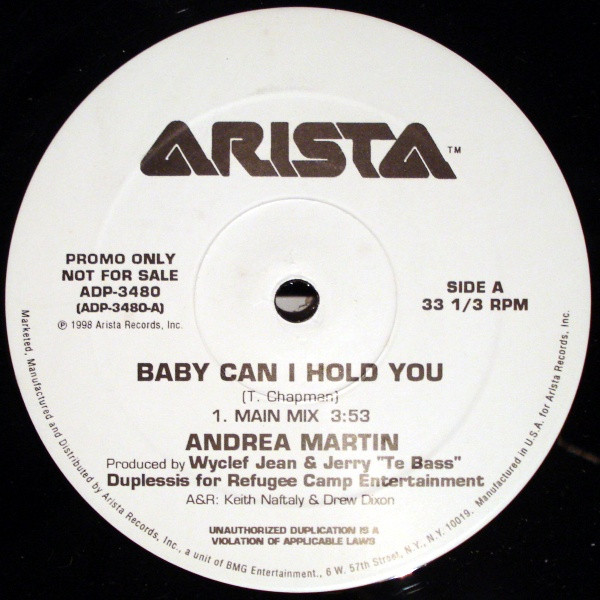

Promotional single by Andrea Martin

from the album The Best of Me
- Length: 4:02
- Label: Arista
- Songwriter: Tracy Chapman
- Producers: Jerry Duplessis; Wyclef Jean

In 1998, American singer-songwriter Andrea Martin covered "Baby Can I Hold You" for her only studio album, The Best of Me. A promotional 12-inch single was released, and Andrea performed the song on Showtime at the Apollo.

== Ronan Keating version ==
"Baby Can I Hold You"

Single by Ronan Keating

from the album 10 Years of Hits
- Released: July 6, 2005
- Length: 3:14
- Label: Polydor
- Songwriter: Tracy Chapman
- Producer: Steve Mac

Ronan Keating singles chronology
"Father and Son" (2004)	"Baby Can I Hold You" (2005)	"All Over Again" (2006)

In 2005, Boyzone frontman Ronan Keating released his own cover of "Baby Can I Hold You" as the third and final single from his greatest hits compilation, 10 Years of Hits. It became the second song that he originally recorded with Boyzone to be re-released for his own solo career. In the United Kingdom, the single was only released via digital download and thus it failed to chart. In Germany, the single received a full-scale release and peaked at number 42 on the German Singles Chart.

German CD single

1. "Baby Can I Hold You" (German radio mix) – 3:10
2. "Baby Can I Hold You" (live and acoustic) – 3:09
3. "This Is Your Song" (live at Wembley Arena) – 4:38
4. "Life Is A Rollercoaster" (live and acoustic) – 3:47

=== Charts ===
Chart (2005)	Peak position
Germany (GfK)	42

== Nicki Minaj copyright infringement lawsuit ==
In 2018, Nicki Minaj used an interpolation of "Baby Can I Hold You" in her song "Sorry" featuring Nas. Minaj had used the sample believing it was from the song "Sorry" by Shelly Thunder, unaware that song was actually a cover of "Baby Can I Hold You". Minaj left the song off her fourth studio album due to clearance issues, but the song was leaked to Funkmaster Flex shortly after the album's release in August. In October that year, Chapman sued Minaj for copyright infringement, claiming that Minaj leaked the song to Flex after Chapman denied her team's request for clearance of the song multiple times beginning in June. In September 2020, District Court judge Virginia A. Phillips ruled in favor of Minaj stating that Minaj's experimentation with Chapman's song constitutes fair use rather than copyright infringement. In January 2021, the dispute was settled when Minaj paid Chapman $450,000 to avoid a pending trial.

== Cover versions ==
In 1988, Neil Diamond recorded a version of the song for his album The Best Years of Our Lives.

In 2021, singer-songwriter Drew Pizzulo released a holiday version of the song entitled "Baby Can I Hold You Tonight, Christmastime" which topped the Christmas Chart, peaked at number two on the Pop chart and number six on the Cover Charts on Soundclick.com.
