= Better Day (song) =

1997 single by Ocean Colour Scene

Single by Ocean Colour Scene

from the album Marchin' Already
- B-side: "The Best Bet on Chinaski"; "On and On"
- Released: 10 November 1997
- Length: 3:44
- Label: MCA
- Songwriter: Ocean Colour Scene
- Producers: Brendan Lynch; Martyn "Max" Heyes; Ocean Colour Scene

Ocean Colour Scene singles chronology
"Travellers Tune" (1997)	"Better Day" (1997)	"It's a Beautiful Thing" (1998)

"Better Day" is a song by English rock band Ocean Colour Scene. The song was released as the third single from their third studio album, Marchin' Already, on 10 November 1997 and reached number nine on the UK Singles Chart.

== Track listings ==
UK CD single

1. "Better Day"
2. "The Best Bet on Chinaski"
3. "On and On"

UK 7-inch and cassette single

1. "Better Day"
2. "The Best Bet on Chinaski"

Japanese CD single

1. "Better Day"
2. "The Best Bet on Chinaski"
3. "On and On"
4. "The Day We Caught the Train" (acoustic)

== Personnel ==
Personnel are taken from the Marchin' Already album booklet.

- Ocean Colour Scene – writing, production, recording, mixing
  - Simon Fowler – vocals, guitar
  - Steve Cradock – guitar, piano
  - Damon Minchella – bass guitar
  - Oscar Harrison – drums
- Brendan Lynch – production, recording, mixing
- Martyn "Max" Heyes – production

== Charts ==
Chart (1997)	Peak position
Europe (Eurochart Hot 100)	83
Scotland Singles (OCC)	5
UK Singles (OCC)	9

== Release history ==
Region	Date	Format(s)	Label(s)	Ref.
United Kingdom	10 November 1997	7-inch vinyl; CD; cassette	MCA	
Japan	21 January 1998	CD	Universal	
