= Shooting Star (Disney song) =

1997 song from Hercules

"Shooting Star" is a song from Disney's 1997 animated feature film Hercules. The song, with a central theme of feeling disconnected, was written by Alan Menken and David Zippel replaced by "Go the Distance". It was the first song that was written for the character of Hercules.

For his Hercules audition, Roger Bart sang the deleted song "Proud of Your Boy" from Aladdin and "Shooting Star"; Menken cried during his audition. The production team recorded the full track with Hercules' singing voice Roger Bart and the full orchestra before replacing it. Menken's original concept for the sonic palette of the movie was Candide, though when it was decided to switch to gospel it was decided that the song felt "too wistful, with not enough drive". They thought it made Hercules seem too soft, and decided they wanted to emphasise the "muscularity of his journey". As a result, the duo of songwriters wrote "Go the Distance". Bart said that when the song was cut, and they decided to write him a new song, he was "thrilled and flabbergasted and grateful".

According to Bart, the shooting star Hercules sees during the song is Pegasus watching over him.

Bart connected to the song because of his own disorientation as a young actor, saying "That the song was so much about feeling out of place but also connected to a part of yourself that's very strong inside. That even though you feel like you didn't belong where you were at that moment, you knew it wasn't just you. There was something about yourself that was going to be okay in all of this, even though you knew this was where you were not supposed to be right now."

Menken said, "It's a very sweet song, and it's very much a heartfelt 'I wish I knew where I belong' [song]".

Similar to "Proud of Your Boy" from Aladdin, "Written in Stone" and "Keep 'Em Guessing" from Mulan, and "Human Again" from Beauty and the Beast, this deleted song was reinstated in the stage adaptation of the film: the 2019 musical Hercules.

The full demo recording and the accompanying sketch storyboard debuted at the 2017 D23 for a panel entitled "Zero to Hero: The Making of Hercules" to celebrate the 20th anniversary of the film's release.

== Boyzone version ==
"Shooting Star"

Single by Boyzone

from the album Where We Belong (Japanese edition)
- A-side: "Baby Can I Hold You"
- Released: November 24, 1997
- Genre: Pop
- Length: 4:13
- Label: Walt Disney
- Composer: Alan Menken
- Lyricist: David Zippel

Boyzone singles chronology
"Picture of You" (1997)	"Baby Can I Hold You" / "Shooting Star" (1997)	"All That I Need" (1998)

A single version was recorded by Irish boy band Boyzone and released as a double A-side single in 1997 as "Baby Can I Hold You"/"Shooting Star". This version reached a peak of number 2 on the UK Singles Chart. The single's music video featured Boyzone member Stephen Gately, who sings the lead vocals of the song, performing the song solo on a big stage, while the other members are shown backstage, signing autographs and meeting with fans. Clips from Hercules are shown throughout the video, with a few being shown on the stage's screens.
