= Hundred Mile High City =

1997 single by Ocean Colour Scene

Single by Ocean Colour Scene

from the album Marchin' Already
- B-side: "The Face Smiles Back Easily"; "Falling to the Floor"; "Hello Monday"
- Released: 16 June 1997
- Length: 3:58 (album version); 3:06 (single version)
- Label: MCA
- Songwriter: Ocean Colour Scene
- Producers: Brendan Lynch; Martyn "Max" Heyes; Ocean Colour Scene

Ocean Colour Scene singles chronology
"The Circle" (1996)	"Hundred Mile High City" (1997)	"Travellers Tune" (1997)

"Hundred Mile High City" is a song by British rock band Ocean Colour Scene, taken as the first single from their third studio album, Marchin' Already (1997). The song was released in 1997 and reached number four on the UK Singles Chart, becoming the band's joint most-successful single on the UK Singles Chart and their second-most successful in terms of number of weeks spent in the top 75, staying in for seven weeks. It was also their first single to chart in Ireland and the Netherlands, peaking at numbers 15 and 98, respectively.

In 1998, "Hundred Mile High City" appeared on the soundtrack to the black comedy crime film Lock, Stock and Two Smoking Barrels. After the film premiered in the United States the following year, the song was added to several US alternative radio stations in mid-March 1999.

== Track listings ==
UK CD single

1. "Hundred Mile High City"
2. "The Face Smiles Back Easily"
3. "Falling to the Floor"
4. "Hello Monday"

UK 7-inch and cassette single

A. "Hundred Mile High City"
B. "The Face Smiles Back Easily"

European CD single

1. "Hundred Mile High City"
2. "Hello Monday"

Japanese CD single

1. "Hundred Mile High City"
2. "Travellers Tune"
3. "Falling to the Floor"
4. "Hello Monday"

== Personnel ==
Personnel are taken from the UK CD single liner notes and the Marchin' Already album booklet.

- Ocean Colour Scene – writing, production, recording, mixing, engineering
  - Simon Fowler – vocals, guitar
  - Steve Cradock – guitar, piano
  - Damon Minchella – bass guitar
  - Oscar Harrison – drums
- Brendan Lynch – production, recording, mixing, engineering
- Martyn "Max" Heyes – production, engineering

== Charts ==
=== Weekly charts ===
Chart (1997)	Peak position
Ireland (IRMA)	15
Israel (IBA)	35
Netherlands (Single Top 100)	98
Scottish Singles Sales (Official Charts)	3
UK Singles (Official Charts)	4

=== Year-end charts ===
Chart (1997)	Position
UK Singles (OCC)	118

== Certifications ==
Region	Certification	Certified units/sales
United Kingdom (BPI)	Silver	200,000^{‡}
^{‡} Sales+streaming figures based on certification alone.

== Release history ==
Region	Date	Format(s)	Label(s)	Ref.
United Kingdom	16 June 1997	7-inch vinyl; CD; cassette	MCA	
Japan	21 August 1997	CD	Universal	
United States	13 March 1999	Alternative radio	MCA	

== In popular culture ==
"Hundred Mile High City" was used as the theme to the film Lock, Stock and Two Smoking Barrels and the computer game Three Lions.
