= Travellers Tune =

1997 single by Ocean Colour Scene

Single by Ocean Colour Scene

from the album Marchin' Already
- B-side: "Song for the Front Row"; "On the Way Home"; "All God's Children Need Travelling Shoes"
- Released: 25 August 1997
- Length: 3:41
- Label: MCA
- Songwriter: Ocean Colour Scene
- Producers: Brendan Lynch; Martyn "Max" Heyes; Ocean Colour Scene

Ocean Colour Scene singles chronology
"Hundred Mile High City" (1997)	"Travellers Tune" (1997)	"Better Day" (1997)

"Travellers Tune" is a song by English rock band Ocean Colour Scene. American soul singer P. P. Arnold provides additional vocals on the track. The song was released on 25 August 1997 as the second single from the band's third studio album, Marchin' Already (1997), and reached number five on the UK Singles Chart.

== Track listings ==
UK CD single

1. "Travellers Tune"
2. "Song for the Front Row"
3. "On the Way Home"
4. "All God's Children Need Travelling Shoes"

UK 7-inch and cassette single

1. "Travellers Tune"
2. "Song for the Front Row"

Japanese mini-album

1. "Travellers Tune"
2. "Song for the Front Row"
3. "On the Way Home"
4. "All God's Children Need Travelling Shoes"
5. "The Faces Smiles Back Easily"
6. "Chicken Bones and Stones"

== Personnel ==
Personnel are taken from the UK CD single liner notes and the Marchin' Already album booklet.

- Ocean Colour Scene – writing, production, recording, mixing, engineering
  - Simon Fowler – vocals, guitar
  - Steve Cradock – guitar, piano
  - Damon Minchella – bass guitar
  - Oscar Harrison – drums
- P. P. Arnold – additional vocals
- Brendan Lynch – production, recording, mixing, engineering
- Martyn "Max" Heyes – production, engineering

== Charts ==
Chart (1997)	Peak position
Europe (Eurochart Hot 100)	63
Ireland (IRMA)	30
Israel (IBA)	34
Scotland Singles (Official Charts)	3
UK Singles (Official Charts)	5

== Release history ==
Region	Date	Format(s)	Label(s)	Ref.
United Kingdom	25 August 1997	7-inch vinyl; CD; cassette	MCA	
Japan	21 November 1997	CD	Universal	
