= The Very Best of The Jam =

Greatest hits album by The Jam
- Released: 25 October 1997
- Recorded: 1977–1982
- Genre: Mod revival, punk rock, new wave
- Length: 64:15
- Label: Polydor

The Jam chronology
Direction Reaction Creation (1997)	The Very Best of The Jam (1997)	Fire & Skill: The Songs of the Jam (1999)

Professional ratings
Review scores
Source	Rating
AllMusic	5/5 stars

The Very Best of The Jam is the third greatest hits package (fourth including Compact Snap!) from The Jam. The compilation was released on 25 October 1997, and features all of The Jam's singles (A-side tracks) in chronological order.

This compilation album contains the same nineteen tracks previously released upon the 1991 album Greatest Hits, although The Very Best of The Jam contains two further tracks: "'A' Bomb in Wardour Street" and "Dreams of Children". This compilation also has a similar track listing to Compact Snap! with "Just Who Is the 5 O'Clock Hero?" replacing "Smithers-Jones".

"The Bitterest Pill (I Ever Had to Swallow)" was re-released as a single in 1997 to promote the album; it had previously been released as a single in 1982.

A VHS cassette of the same name featuring 15 music videos was also released. This was effectively a re-titled re-release of both the 1983 Snap! and 1991 Greatest Hits VHS cassettes, both of which featured the same 15 music videos.

== Track listing ==
All tracks are written by Paul Weller except where noted.

No.	Title	Original Album	Length
1.	"In the City"	In the City, 1977	2:20
2.	"All Around the World"	Non-album single, 1977	2:24
3.	"The Modern World"	This Is the Modern World, 1977	2:30
4.	"News of the World" (Bruce Foxton)	Non-album single, 1978	3:27
5.	"David Watts" (Ray Davies)	All Mod Cons, 1978	2:53
6.	"'A' Bomb in Wardour Street"	All Mod Cons	2:33
7.	"Down in the Tube Station at Midnight" (Single edit)	All Mod Cons	4:03
8.	"Strange Town"	Non-album single, 1979	3:48
9.	"When You're Young"	Non-album single, 1979	3:12
10.	"The Eton Rifles"	Setting Sons, 1979	3:58
11.	"Going Underground"	Non-album single, 1980	2:53
12.	"Dreams of Children"	B-side to "Going Underground"	2:58
13.	"Start!"	Sound Affects, 1980	2:27
14.	"That's Entertainment"	Sound Affects	3:22
15.	"Funeral Pyre" (Weller, Foxton, Rick Buckler)	Non-album single, 1981	3:28
16.	"Absolute Beginners"	Non-album single, 1981	2:49
17.	"Town Called Malice"	The Gift, 1982	2:53
18.	"Precious" (7" Edit)	The Gift	3:32
19.	"Just Who Is the 5 O'Clock Hero?"	The Gift	2:15
20.	"The Bitterest Pill (I Ever Had to Swallow)"	Non-album single, 1982	3:34
21.	"Beat Surrender"	Non-album single, 1982	3:28

== Charts ==
Chart (2016)	Peak position
New Zealand Heatseekers Albums (RMNZ)	5
