= The Sound of the Jam =

Compilation album by The Jam
- Released: 21 May 2002
- Genre: Mod revival; rock
- Length: 1:19:25; 2:27:25 (2 Disc version)
- Label: Polydor; Universal

The Jam chronology
Fire and Skill: The Songs of the Jam (1999)	The Sound of the Jam (2002)	Snap! (2006)

Professional ratings
Review scores
Source	Rating
AllMusic	4/5 stars

The Sound of the Jam is a compilation album and the fifth greatest hits album by the group The Jam, released to mark their twenty-fifth anniversary. It contains a remixed version of 'That's Entertainment', featuring only the guitars and vocals of the demo version; and without the bass, drums and percussion.

As well as the standard 1-CD edition there is also a 2-CD+DVD edition which includes a DVD of 11 of the Jam's music videos (all of which and more would be included on the following year's The Complete Jam on Film DVD).

== Track listing ==
All tracks written by Paul Weller unless noted.

=== Disc one ===
No.	Title	Writer(s)	Album	Length
1.	"In the City"		In the City (1977)	2:20
2.	"Away from the Numbers"		In the City (1977)	4:03
3.	"The Modern World"		This Is the Modern World (1977)	2:31
4.	"David Watts"	Ray Davies	All Mod Cons (1978)	2:56
5.	"Down in the Tube Station at Midnight"		All Mod Cons (1978)	4:01
6.	"It's Too Bad"		All Mod Cons (1978)	2:37
7.	"To Be Someone (Didn't We Have a Nice Time)"		All Mod Cons (1978)	2:30
8.	"Mr. Clean"		All Mod Cons (1978)	3:29
9.	"English Rose"		All Mod Cons (1978)	2:51
10.	"The Butterfly Collector"		Setting Sons (1979)	3:09
11.	"The Eton Rifles"		Setting Sons (1979)	3:59
12.	"Private Hell"		Setting Sons (1979)	3:51
13.	"Thick as Thieves"		Setting Sons (1979)	3:40
14.	"Smithers-Jones"	Bruce Foxton	Setting Sons (1979)	3:00
15.	"Saturday's Kids"		Setting Sons (1979)	2:53
16.	"Going Underground"		Setting Sons (Bonus Tracks) (2001)	2:56
17.	"Start!"		Sound Affects (1980)	2:31
18.	"Liza Radley"		Sound Affects (1980)	2:32
19.	"Pretty Green"		Sound Affects (1980)	2:37
20.	"Boy About Town" (UK, Japan and Mexico only Bonus Track)		Sound Affects (1980)	1:59
21.	"That's Entertainment"		Sound Affects (1980)	3:36
22.	"Tales from the Riverbank"		Snap! (1983)	3:26
23.	"Town Called Malice"		The Gift (1982)	2:54
24.	"Ghosts"		The Gift (1982)	2:11
25.	"Carnation"		The Gift (1982)	3:28
26.	"Beat Surrender"		Snap! (1983)	3:25
Total length:				1:19:37

=== Disc two (Deluxe edition only) ===
No.	Title	Writer(s)	Length
1.	"The Dreams of Children"		3:04
2.	"News of the World"	Foxton	3:29
3.	"Strange Town"		3:49
4.	"When You're Young"		3:13
5.	"Funeral Pyre"	Weller; Rick Buckler; Foxton	3:29
6.	"Absolute Beginners"		2:50
7.	"Move on Up"	Curtis Mayfield	3:53
8.	"Shopping"		3:22
9.	"Pop Art Poem"		2:10
10.	"A Solid Bond in Your Heart"		2:50
11.	"No One in the World"		2:24
12.	"And Your Bird Can Sing"	John Lennon; Paul McCartney	1:54
13.	"Burning Sky"		3:40
14.	"Disguises"	Pete Townshend	3:19
15.	"Get Yourself Together"	Steve Marriott; Ronnie Lane	1:59
16.	"The Great Depression"		2:53
17.	"Stoned Out of My Mind"	Barbara Jean Acklin; Eugene Booker Record	3:19
18.	"Pity Poor Alfie" / "Fever"	Weller; Eddie J. Cooley; John Davenport	4:41
19.	"But I'm Different Now"		1:56
20.	"I Got You (I Feel Good)"	James Brown	2:41
21.	"Hey Mister"	Foxton	1:52
22.	"We've Only Started"		2:37
23.	"So Sad About Us"	Townshend	2:36
Total length:			1:08:13

== Charts ==
Chart (2002)	Peak position
UK Official Charts Company	3

== Personnel ==
- Paul Weller – vocals, lead guitar, bass guitar, keyboards, backing vocals
- Rick Buckler – drums, percussion
- Bruce Foxton – vocals, bass guitar, rhythm guitar, backing vocals
- Steve Brookes – lead guitar (1972–1976)

Additional personnel

- Tracie Young – backing vocals on "Beat Surrender"
- Peter Wilson – piano, drums, keyboards, Hammond organ
- Steve Nichol – trumpet, Hammond organ
- Luke Tunney – trumpet
- Martin Drover – trumpet
- Keith Thomas – saxophone, soprano sax
- Afrodiziak – background vocals
- Russell Henderson – steel drums
