= Snap! (album) =

1983 compilation album by the Jam

Compilation album by The Jam
- Released: 14 October 1983
- Genre: New wave; Mod revival; Punk rock; Post punk; Soul
- Label: Polydor

The Jam chronology
Dig The New Breed (1982)	Snap! (1983)	Greatest Hits (1991)

Professional ratings
Review scores
Source	Rating
AllMusic	5/5 stars
Robert Christgau	B+
The Encyclopedia of Popular Music	5/5 stars
The New Rolling Stone Album Guide	4.5/5 stars

Snap! is a greatest hits album by The Jam, released on 14 October 1983, one year after the group disbanded. The double-album includes all sixteen of the band's UK singles, plus some B-sides, album tracks and rarities. Stephen Thomas Erlewine of AllMusic called it "one of the greatest greatest-hits albums of all time". A shorter version, removing the 8 non-singles, was released as a single CD in 1985 as Compact Snap!.

== Editions ==
Initial quantities of the album included a limited edition 4-track EP, Live, recorded at Wembley Arena during the farewell tour of 1982. Featuring the tracks "Get Yourself Together", "Move On Up", "The Great Depression" and "But I'm Different Now", the EP is notable for the fact that these songs were never re-issued on any other Jam compilation.

A shorter version, with 8 tracks less than the original so that it could fit on a single CD, was released in 1984 as Compact Snap!. The omitted tracks were the non-single tracks "Away from the Numbers", "Billy Hunt", "English Rose", "Mr. Clean", "The Butterfly Collector", "Thick As Thieves", "Man in the Corner Shop" and "Tales from the Riverbank". The result is that Compact Snap! is a collection of all The Jam's singles, with the exception of "Just Who Is the 5 O'Clock Hero?". The CD was repackaged in 1990 as All The Choice Cuts for the Australian market as part of the Polydor Startrax series. Compact Snap! has a similar track listing to The Very Best of The Jam with "Smithers-Jones" replacing "Just Who Is the 5 O'Clock Hero?".

Universal Music re-released the album in its entirety on CD in 2006, initial copies including the limited edition live EP. Cover Artwork by Simon Halfon

== Track listing ==
Disc 1
No.	Title	Length
1.	"In the City" (single (April 1977) and In the City (May 1977))
2.	"Away from the Numbers" (In the City (May 1977))
3.	"All Around the World" (non-album single (July 1977))
4.	"The Modern World" (single (October 1977) and This Is the Modern World (November 1977))
5.	"News of the World" (non-album single (March 1978))
6.	"Billy Hunt" (All Mod Cons (November 1978))
7.	"English Rose" (All Mod Cons (November 1978))
8.	"Mr. Clean" (All Mod Cons (November 1978))
9.	"David Watts" (double A-side single with "'A' Bomb in Wardour Street" (August 1978) and All Mod Cons (November 1978))
10.	"'A' Bomb in Wardour Street" (double A-side single with "David Watts" (August 1978) and All Mod Cons (November 1978))
11.	"Down in the Tube Station at Midnight" (single (October 1978) and All Mod Cons (November 1978))
12.	"Strange Town" (non-album single (March 1979))
13.	"The Butterfly Collector" (non-album B-side of "Strange Town" (March 1979))
14.	"When You're Young" (non-album single (August 1979))
15.	"Smithers-Jones" (B-side of "When You're Young" (August 1979) and Setting Sons (November 1979))
16.	"Thick as Thieves" (Setting Sons (November 1979))

Disc 2
No.	Title	Length
1.	"The Eton Rifles" (single (October 1979) and Setting Sons (November 1979))
2.	"Going Underground" (non-album double A-side single with "Dreams of Children" (March 1980))
3.	"Dreams of Children" (non-album double A-side single with "Going Underground" (March 1980))
4.	"That's Entertainment" (previously unreleased demo version (recorded 1980))
5.	"Start!" (single (August 1980) and Sound Affects (November 1980))
6.	"Man in the Corner Shop" (Sound Affects (November 1980))
7.	"Funeral Pyre" (non-album single (May 1981))
8.	"Absolute Beginners" (non-album single (October 1981))
9.	"Tales from the Riverbank" (non-album B-side of "Absolute Beginners" (October 1981))
10.	"Town Called Malice" (double A-side single with "Precious" (January 1982) and The Gift (March 1982))
11.	"Precious" (double A-side single with "Town Called Malice" (January 1982) and The Gift (March 1982))
12.	"The Bitterest Pill (I Ever Had to Swallow)" (non-album single (September 1982))
13.	"Beat Surrender" (non-album single (November 1982))

Limited edition bonus EP (all tracks previously unreleased and recorded live at Wembley Arena, 2 & 3 December 1982)

1. "Move On Up"
2. "Get Yourself Together"
3. "The Great Depression"
4. "But I'm Different Now"

== Charts ==
Snap! spent 30 weeks on the UK album charts, which debuted and peaked at No. 2 for two weeks. The shorter version, Compact Snap!, also charted in the UK, peaking at No. 39 in July 2005.

Chart (1983)	Peak position
Australian (Kent Music Report)	70
UK Albums (OCC)	2

== Certifications ==
Region	Certification	Certified units/sales
United Kingdom (BPI)	Platinum	300,000^{^}
^{^} Shipments figures based on certification alone.
