= Greatest Hits (The Jam album) =

Greatest hits album by the Jam
- Released: 1 July 1991
- Genre: Rock
- Label: Polydor

The Jam chronology
Snap! (1983)	Greatest Hits (1991)	Extras (1992)

Professional ratings
Review scores
Source	Rating
AllMusic	4.5/5 stars

Greatest Hits is the third compilation/greatest hits album from the Jam, released in 1991. It includes all of the band's eighteen hit singles plus "Precious" (which was released as a double A-side along with "Town Called Malice"). It includes two singles, "That's Entertainment" and "Just Who Is the 5 O'Clock Hero?", which made the UK charts without ever being released there, they charted after being heavily imported from Europe. The following year a companion album of rarities, titled Extras, was released.

== Track listing ==
1. "In the City"
2. "All Around the World"
3. "The Modern World"
4. "News of the World"
5. "David Watts"
6. "Down in the Tube Station at Midnight"
7. "Strange Town"
8. "When You're Young"
9. "The Eton Rifles"
10. "Going Underground"
11. "Start!"
12. "That's Entertainment"
13. "Funeral Pyre"
14. "Absolute Beginners"
15. "Town Called Malice"
16. "Precious"
17. "Just Who Is the 5 O'Clock Hero?"
18. "The Bitterest Pill (I Ever Had to Swallow)"
19. "Beat Surrender"
