= Direction Reaction Creation =

Compilation album by the Jam
- Released: 26 May 1997
- Genre: Rock
- Label: Polydor

The Jam chronology
| Collection (1996) | Direction Reaction Creation (1997) | The Very Best of The Jam (1997) |

Professional ratings
Review scores
| Source | Rating |
|---|---|
| AllMusic | 5/5 stars |
| NME | 8/10 |
| Pitchfork | (8.3/10) |
| Uncut | 5/5 stars |

Direction Reaction Creation is an anthology issued in 1997 by the British band the Jam. It includes 117 tracks over 5 discs. Discs 1 to 4 comprise all of the band's studio albums and all of the non-album singles and B-sides presented chronologically. Disc 5 is made up of demos and outtakes. The box set reached number 8 in the UK Albums Chart.

== Track listing ==
=== CD 1 ===
1. "In the City"
2. "Takin' My Love"
3. "Art School"
4. "I've Changed My Address"
5. "Slow Down"
6. "I Got By in Time"
7. "Away from the Numbers"
8. "Batman Theme"
9. "Sounds from the Street"
10. "Non-Stop Dancing"
11. "Time for Truth"
12. "Bricks and Mortar"
13. "All Around the World"
14. "Carnaby Street"
15. "The Modern World" (Album Version)
16. "London Traffic"
17. "Standards"
18. "Life from a Window"
19. "The Combine"
20. "Don't Tell Them You're Sane"
21. "In the Street Today"
22. "London Girl"
23. "I Need You (For Someone)"
24. "Here Comes the Weekend"
25. "Tonight at Noon"
26. "In the Midnight Hour"

=== CD 2 ===
1. "News of the World"
2. "Aunties and Uncles (Impulsive Youths)"
3. "Innocent Man"
4. "David Watts" (Album Version)
5. "'A' Bomb in Wardour Street" (Album Version)
6. "Down in the Tube Station at Midnight" (Album Version)
7. "So Sad About Us"
8. "The Night"
9. "All Mod Cons"
10. "To Be Someone (Didn't We Have A Nice Time)"
11. "Mr. Clean"
12. "English Rose"
13. "In the Crowd"
14. "Billy Hunt"
15. "It's Too Bad"
16. "Fly"
17. "The Place I Love"
18. "Strange Town"
19. "The Butterfly Collector"
20. "When You're Young"
21. "Smithers-Jones" (Single Version)
22. "The Eton Rifles" (Album Version)
23. "See-Saw"

=== CD 3 ===
1. "Girl on the Phone"
2. "Thick as Thieves"
3. "Private Hell"
4. "Little Boy Soldiers"
5. "Wasteland"
6. "Burning Sky"
7. "Smithers-Jones" (Setting Sons Version)
8. "Saturday's Kids"
9. "Heat Wave"
10. "Going Underground"
11. "The Dreams of Children"
12. "Start!" (Album Version)
13. "Liza Radley"
14. "Pretty Green"
15. "Monday"
16. "But I'm Different Now"
17. "Set the House Ablaze"
18. "That's Entertainment"
19. "Dream Time"
20. "Man in the Corner Shop"
21. "Music for the Last Couple"
22. "Boy About Town"
23. "Scrape Away"

=== CD 4 ===
1. "Funeral Pyre"
2. "Disguises"
3. "Absolute Beginners"
4. "Tales from the Riverbank"
5. "Town Called Malice"
6. "Precious" (12" Version)
7. "Happy Together"
8. "Ghosts"
9. "Just Who Is the 5 O'Clock Hero?"
10. "Trans-Global Express"
11. "Running on the Spot"
12. "Circus"
13. "The Planner's Dream Goes Wrong"
14. "Carnation"
15. "The Gift"
16. "The Great Depression"
17. "The Bitterest Pill (I Ever Had to Swallow)"
18. "Pity Poor Alfie/Fever"
19. "Beat Surrender"
20. "Shopping"
21. "Move on Up"
22. "Stoned Out of My Mind"
23. "War"

=== CD 5 ===
1. "In the City" (8-track Polydor Band Demo)
2. "Time for Truth" (8-track Polydor Band Demo)
3. "Sounds from the Street" (8-track Polydor Band Demo)
4. "So Sad About Us" (Band Demo)
5. "Worlds Apart" (Demo)
6. "Billy Hunt" (Alternate Version)
7. "It's Too Bad" (Band Demo)
8. "To Be Someone" (Band Demo)
9. "David Watts" (Band Demo)
10. "Best of Both Worlds" (Band Demo)
11. "That's Entertainment" (Band Demo)
12. "Rain" (Demo)
13. "Dream Time" (Demo)
14. "Dead End Street" (Demo)
15. "Stand By Me" (Demo)
16. "Every Little Bit Hurts" (Demo)
17. "Tales from the Riverbank" (Alternate Version)
18. "Walking in Heaven's Sunshine" (Demo)
19. "Precious" (Demo)
20. "Pity Poor Alfie" (Swing Version)
21. "The Bitterest Pill (I Ever Had to Swallow)" (First Version)
22. "A Solid Bond in Your Heart" (Band Demo)

== Personnel ==
- Afrodiziak – background vocals
- Martin Drover – trumpet
- Claudia Fontaine – background vocals
- Russell Henderson – steel drums
- Steve Nichol – trumpet, Hammond organ
- Keith Thomas – saxophone, soprano sax
- Luke Tunney – trumpet
- Caron Wheeler – background vocals
- Peter Wilson – piano, drums, keyboards, Hammond organ, producer, string arrangements, remixing
- Tracie Young – background vocals

=== Additional personnel ===
- Neil Allen – liner notes, essay
- Vic Coppersmith-Heaven – producer
- Paul Cox – photography
- Johnny Devlin – liner notes, essay
- Ian Dickson – photography
- Jill Furmanovsky – photography
- Pat Gilbert – liner notes, essay
- Frank Griffin – photography
- Simon Halfon – art direction, design
- Paolo Hewitt – liner notes, foreword
- The Jam – producer
- Mike Laye – photography
- Gered Mankowitz – photography
- Dennis Munday – producer, compilation, remixing, research
- Steve Musters – remixing
- Carlos Olms – photography
- Denis O'Regan – photography
- Chris Parry – producer
- John Reed – liner notes, essay
- Pennie Smith – photography
- Vic Smith – producer
- Tony Taverner – producer
- Virginia Turbett – photography
- Laurens Van Houten – photography
- Roger Wake – digital remastering
- Arnold Williams – photography
