= Extras (album) =

Extras (The Jam album)

Compilation album by The Jam
- Released: 6 April 1992
- Genre: Rock
- Label: Polydor

The Jam chronology
Greatest Hits (1991)	Extras (The Jam album) (1992)	Collection (1996)

Professional ratings
Review scores
Source	Rating
AllMusic	4.5/5 stars

Extras is a compilation by the British group The Jam. Released in April 1992 it includes 26 B-sides, rarities, and unreleased tracks.

Eleven of these songs (tracks 1, 2, 4, 5, 6, 14, 16, 17, 18, 19 and 25) were released on the box set Direction Reaction Creation, making the other 15 tracks exclusive to this release.

== Track listing ==
1. "The Dreams of Children" (Double A-side to the single "Going Underground")
2. "Tales from the Riverbank" (B-side to "Absolute Beginners")
3. "Liza Radley" (Demo)
4. "Move on Up" (B-side to "Beat Surrender" and a cover of the Curtis Mayfield song)
5. "Shopping" (B-side to "Beat Surrender")
6. "Smithers-Jones" (Band version) (B-side of "When You're Young")
7. "Pop Art Poem" (Demo version)
8. "Boy About Town" (Alternate version)
9. "A Solid Bond in Your Heart" (Demo, later released as a single by The Style Council. An alternate demo of this song appears on "Direction Reaction Creation".)
10. "No One in the World" (Demo)
11. "And Your Bird Can Sing" (Demo; a cover of The Beatles song)
12. "Burning Sky" (Demo)
13. "Thick As Thieves" (Demo)
14. "Disguises" (B-side to "Funeral Pyre" and a cover of The Who song)
15. "Get Yourself Together" (Demo; a cover of the track originally recorded by The Small Faces)
16. "The Butterfly Collector" (B-side to "Strange Town")
17. "The Great Depression" (B-side to "Just Who Is the 5 O'Clock Hero?")
18. "Stoned Out of My Mind" (B-side to "Beat Surrender" and a cover of the song by The Chi-Lites)
19. "Pity Poor Alfie/Fever" (B-side to "The Bitterest Pill (I Ever Had to Swallow)")
20. "But I'm Different Now" (Demo)
21. "I Got You (I Feel Good)" (Demo; a cover of the James Brown song)
22. "Hey Mister" (Previously unavailable)
23. "Saturday's Kids" (Demo)
24. "We've Only Started" (Previously unavailable)
25. "So Sad About Us" (B-side to "Down in the Tube Station at Midnight" and a cover of the track by The Who)
26. "The Eton Rifles" (Demo)

== Personnel ==
- Rick Buckler – drums
- Bruce Foxton – bass, vocals
- Paul Weller – guitar, vocals

Production

- Vic Coppersmith-Heaven – producer
- The Jam – producer
- Tony Taverner – producer
- Peter Wilson – producer, remixing
- Dennis Munday – compilation, research
- Paolo Hewitt – liner notes

== Certifications ==
Certifications for Extras
Region	Certification	Certified units/sales
United Kingdom (BPI)	Gold	100,000^{‡}
^{‡} Sales+streaming figures based on certification alone.
