= Fire & Skill: The Songs of the Jam =

Compilation album by Various artists
- Released: 1 November 1999
- Recorded: Various
- Genre: Rock, mod revival
- Length: 36:55
- Label: Ignition
- Producer: Simon Halfon

Various artists chronology
| The Very Best of The Jam (1997) | Fire & Skill: The Songs of the Jam (1999) | The Sound of the Jam (2002) |

Professional ratings
Review scores
| Source | Rating |
|---|---|
| AllMusic | 4/5 stars |
| NME | 2/10 stars |

Fire & Skill: The Songs of the Jam is a compilation album of hit songs written by The Jam. Each track on the album was performed by a different artist or band.

Buffalo Tom singer/guitarist Bill Janovitz was surprised to have the chance to do "Going Underground", saying that his band usually had to be content with doing also-ran songs on compilations such as this. Janovitz said he felt that playing the song in his band's usual style would have sounded too much like The Jam, so he and his bandmates reinterpreted it in a slower, less manic style. Janovitz added that this was the first time his band had experimented with loops.

A double A-side single of "Going Underground" and "Carnation" was released in 1999.

== Track listing ==
1. Liam Gallagher & Steve Cradock – "Carnation"
2. Beastie Boys featuring Miho Hatori – "Start!"
3. Reef – "That's Entertainment"
4. Heavy Stereo – "The Gift"
5. Silver Sun – "Art School"
6. Everything but the Girl – "English Rose"
7. Buffalo Tom – "Going Underground"
8. Garbage – "The Butterfly Collector"
9. Ben Harper – "The Modern World"
10. Gene – "Town Called Malice"
11. Noel Gallagher – "To Be Someone"
12. Paul Weller – "No One in the World" (hidden track – different from Extras)
