= Dig the New Breed =

Final album by the Jam

Live album by the Jam
- Released: 10 December 1982
- Recorded: 1977, 1979, 1981, 1982
- Genre: Punk rock; mod revival
- Label: Polydor
- Producer: Peter Wilson

The Jam chronology
The Gift (1982)	Dig the New Breed (1982)	Snap! (1983)

Professional ratings
Review scores
Source	Rating
AllMusic	3.5/5 stars

Dig the New Breed is the final album by the Jam, excluding compilations released after the group's split in December 1982. It is a collection of live performances recorded between 1977 and 1982.

== Track listing ==
All songs written by Paul Weller except as indicated.

Side one

1. "In the City" (100 Club, London, 11 September 1977)
2. "All Mod Cons" (the Rainbow, London, 3 December 1979)
3. "To Be Someone (Didn't We Have a Nice Time)" (the Rainbow, London, 3 December 1979)
4. "It's Too Bad" (the Rainbow, London, 3 December 1979)
5. "Start!" (the Hammersmith Palais, London, 14 December 1981)
6. "Big Bird" (Eddie Floyd) (the Hammersmith Palais, London, 14 December 1981)
7. "Set the House Ablaze" (the Hammersmith Palais, London, 14 December 1981)

Side two

1. "Ghosts" (Bingley Hall, Birmingham, England, 21 March 1982)
2. "Standards" (Reading University, 16 February 1979)
3. "In the Crowd" (the Edinburgh Playhouse, 6 April 1982)
4. "Going Underground" (Glasgow Apollo, 8 April 1982)
5. "Dreams of Children" (Glasgow Apollo, 8 April 1982)
6. "That's Entertainment" (Glasgow Apollo, 7 April 1982) (sleeve notes say 8 April but it is actually from 7 April)
7. "Private Hell" (Glasgow Apollo, 8 April 1982)

== Chart performance ==
Dig the New Breed spent 16 weeks on the UK albums chart, rising to No. 2. In the U.S., the album spent nine weeks on the Billboard 200 and reached its peak position of No. 131 in February 1983.

Chart (1983)	Peak position
Australian (Kent Music Report)	54
