= Tinkerbells Fairydust =

British pop group (1967–1969)

- Origin: London, England
- Genres: Pop, psychedelic pop
- Years active: 1967–1969
- Label: Decca

Tinkerbells Fairydust were a British pop group in the late 1960s, who hailed from east London. They recorded three singles and one album for the Decca label.

== Personnel ==
Signed to manager Don Arden, the band members were:

- Stuart Attride (guitar, keyboards, vocals)
- Gerry Wade (bass, vocals)
- Steve Maher (guitar, vocals)
- Barry Creasy (drums, vocals)
- Chas Wade (drums, vocals)
- Eileen Woodman (Hammond organ, vocals)
- Dave Church (vocals)
- Pete Hole (guitar, vocals)

== History ==
Previously, billed as the Rush, they had recorded two singles with Decca: "Happy" / "Once Again", and "Enjoy It" / "Make Mine Music". Prior to that, various personnel had played in Tommy Bishop's Ricochets (for one single on Decca) and Easy Come Easy Go (previously known as Dave & The Strollers).

In 1968, members of the band worked with Jeff Lynne. Lynne's song "Follow Me Follow" was recorded as a demo. Lynne's first proper band The Idle Race released their version on their debut album in 1968. Tinkerbell's Fairydust recorded a proper version as the b-side to their third and final single, "Sheila's Back In Town".

== Singles ==
After the name change to Tinkerbells Fairydust, it recorded the single "Lazy Day", produced by Vic Smith, who went on to produce The Jam and Black Sabbath.

It never had any chart success in the United Kingdom. It did, however, make the charts in Japan where "Lazy Day" reached number two (held off the top spot by The Beatles' "Hey Jude").

Its second single, "Twenty Ten", was a Bach-inspired minor key piece of harmony psychedelia, with wah-wah vox organ, mellotron flutes, Spanish style guitar, and choir-like vocals. The lyrics alluded to the year 2010 which was still 43 years away in 1967. Despite finding favour with the BBC Radio DJ John Peel, it was a commercial flop.

Its third single, "Sheila's Back In Town", was released in January 1969 in the UK. It made the Top 10 in Japan.

== Other recording sessions ==
The band also backed Gene Latter at a recording session at the Lansdowne Studios, Holland Park, resulting in his "Mother's Little Helper" single. They also acted as session backing vocalists at the Decca West Hampstead studios for the "Tommy Bishop Rock and Roll Revival Show" recordings.

== The album ==
An eponymous Tinkerbells Fairydust album was prepared, using four of the tracks from their previous singles and a number of cover versions.

It was due for release in December 1969 on the Decca record label, and was allocated the Catalogue Number Decca SKL/LK 5028. However it was withdrawn prior to release. Some test pressings were made (and 4 or 5 'finished' copies), but it was withdrawn prior to the release date with only a tiny handful of copies left in existence.

The extreme rarity of this album has pushed up its collectability rating to where, in 2007, a shabby scratched copy was sold on eBay for £1,200 and since then (in 2009 & 2010) two other copies have sold in excess of £2000. It is regarded by collectors as one of the most valuable pop/psych albums of all time.

In 1998, a CD and LP reissue circulated with alternative artwork. In 2009, it was reissued again on vinyl LP (with the identical artwork to the original) on Acme Records while an expanded CD was released on Cherry Red's psychedelic imprint, Grapefruit, with various bonus tracks and the band's approval.

== Discography ==
=== Album ===
- Tinkerbells Fairydust (1969), Decca (unreleased, apart from a handful of 'pre-release' copies that escaped destruction by the factory)

(issued on Carnaby Boutique X-0443276CD, 1998)

=== Singles ===
- "Lazy Day" / "In My Magic Garden" (1967), Decca
- "2010" / "Walking My Baby" (1968), Decca
- "Sheila's Back in Town" / "Follow Me Follow" (1969), Decca

=== Compilation appearances ===
- "Twenty Ten" on Rubble Vol. 6, The Clouds Have Groovy Faces (LP) and Rubble Vol. 4 (CD)
- "Marjorine" and "You Keep Me Hanging On" on Syde Trips, Vol. 4 (LP)
- "In My Magic Garden" on British Psychedelic Trip, Vol. 3 (LP) and Great British Psychedelic Trip, Vol. 2: 1965-1970 (CD)
- "Lazy Day" on British Psychedelic Trip, Vol. 4 (LP) and Great British Psychedelic Trip, Vol. 2 (CD)
- "Twenty Ten" on Beatniks & Hipsters '71 (LP)
