= Irritant =

Irritant may refer to:

- A stimulus or agent which causes irritation
- Irritant (album), a 2002 psychedelic trance album
- Irritant (band), a United Kingdom rock musical group
- Irritant (record label), a hardcore electro label based in North London
