= Touch Sensitive (album) =

Studio album by Bruce Foxton
- Released: 12 May 1984
- Studio: Various: Tapestry Studios, London; The Manor, Shipton-on-Cherwell; RAK Studios, London; Ridge Farm Studios, Capel, Surrey; Sarm West Studios, London
- Genre: Pop rock
- Length: 42:09
- Label: Arista
- Producer: Steve Lillywhite; Stan Shaw

Bruce Foxton chronology
Touch Sensitive (1984)	Back in the Room (2012)

Singles from Touch Sensitive
- 1. "Freak" Released: 30 July 1983; 2. "This is the Way" Released: 29 October 1983; 3. "It Makes Me Wonder" Released: 21 April 1984; 4. "My Imagination (S.O.S.)" Released: July 1984

Professional ratings
Review scores
Source	Rating
AllMusic	3.5/5 stars
Record Collector	2/5 stars

Touch Sensitive is the debut solo studio album by English rock musician Bruce Foxton, released on 12 May 1984 by Arista Records. Two tracks, "It Makes Me Wonder" and "Trying to Forget You (Vocal Mix)" were co-written by Foxton and Pete Glenister. The remainder of the songs are credited solely to Foxton himself. In March of the same year, fellow Jam counterpart Paul Weller released his first official studio album with the band the Style Council, titled Café Bleu. The album was notably his last recording of original material for twenty-eight years, until he released Back in the Room in 2012. Keen to establish himself as a solo artist after the breakup of the Jam, Foxton enlisted producer Steve Lillywhite to give the album a contemporary sound.

Touch Sensitive received a mixed critical reception on release and retrospectively, which have included criticism that it was too commercial in contrast to his work with the Jam. The album peaked at No. 68 on the UK Albums Chart. Four singles were issued from Touch Sensitive: "Freak", "This Is the Way", "It Makes Me Wonder", and "My Imagination (S.O.S.)". The album's lead single, "Freak" was a minor success, peaking at No. 23 in the UK. It also provided Foxton with his only Top 40 hit.

The album was re-released on 20 August 2001 by Cherry Red Records featuring rare bonus content. The reissue was a CD with the original album digitally remastered from the original 1/2" mix tapes; the bonus content consists of three associated B-sides, including cover versions of the songs "25 or 6 to 4" by Chicago and "Get Ready" by the Temptations, as well as the song "Sign of the Times", an outtake written by Foxton. It is currently out of print physically. However, it is currently available as a digital download on Amazon, and iTunes.

== Background ==
When Paul Weller decided to split the Jam in 1982, Foxton suddenly found himself as a solo artist with not a lot of confidence. Bolstered by his publisher, he began writing some songs and got together with session musicians to record what would eventually be known as Touch Sensitive.

Some of the musicians working with Foxton were Andy Duncan, Stan Shaw, Anthony Thistlethwaite, Roddy Lorimer, Adrian Lillywhite, and Judd Lander.

The album wasn't bad, but there was no quality control. The label said they saw me as a solo artist and were behind me for four or five albums, they weren't. It transpired they just wanted to cash in while I was still fresh in the Jam fans' heads. Everything I was writing they would say, 'Yeah, that's great.' I like four or five songs on the album, the rest were like a school report, could do better. But, it got me going again.

— Bruce Foxton,

== Critical reception ==
Reviewing for AllMusic critic Steve "Spaz" Schnee praised the album stating that the album features "top-notch pop songs with hooks galore" adding that "there are plenty of pure pop gems to satisfy any fan of '80s pop music".

== Track listing ==
All tracks are written by Bruce Foxton, except where noted.

Side one
No.	Title	Writer(s)	Producer	Length
1.	"Freak"		Steve Lilywhite	3:28
2.	"It Makes Me Wonder"	Bruce Foxton; Pete Glenister	Stan Shaw	4:00
3.	"This Is the Way"		Lilywhite	3:36
4.	"My Imagination (S.O.S.)"		Shaw	4:06
5.	"What I'd Give"		Shaw	5:16

Side two
No.	Title	Writer(s)	Producer	Length
6.	"Whatever the Reason"		Shaw	4:35
7.	"You Make Me Laugh"		Shaw	3:17
8.	"Are You Ready to Talk"		Lilywhite	3:37
9.	"Trying to Forget You" (Vocal Mix)	Foxton; Glenister	Shaw	5:28
10.	"Writing's on the Wall" (Phase Mix)		Lilywhite	4:46

Additional tracks

Bonus tracks on Cherry Red reissue

No.	Title	Writer(s)	Producer	Length
11.	"25 or 6 to 4"	Robert Lamm	Shaw	4:43
12.	"Sign of the Times"		Lilywhite	4:02
13.	"Get Ready"	William Robinson	Shaw	3:21

== Personnel ==
A promotional poster for the album.

Credits are adapted from the album's liner notes.

Musicians

- Bruce Foxton — lead vocals; bass guitar
- Pete Glenister — guitars
- Andy Duncan — drums on "It Makes Me Wonder" and "You Make Me Laugh"
- Adrian Lillywhite — drums on "Freak", "This is the Way", "Are You Ready" and "Writing's On the Wall" (phase mix); inspiration on "What I'd Give"
- Stan Shaw — keyboards
- Anthony Thistlethwaite — saxophones
- Roddy Lorimer — flugelhorn; trumpet
- Judd Lander — harmonica on "It Makes Me Wonder"
- Roger Downham — vibraphone on "It Makes Me Wonder" and "Trying to Forget You" (vocal mix)
- Marek Lipski — electric violin on "Are You Ready"

Technical

- Alan Douglas, Chris Birkett, Nicholas Froome, Stephen Lipson, Will Gosling — engineer
- Adrian Peacock — photography

== Chart performance ==
Album

Year	Chart	Peak position	Total weeks
1984	UK Albums Chart	68	4

Singles UK Singles Chart

Year	Single	Chart	Peak position	Total weeks
1983	"Freak"	UK Singles Chart	23	5
1983	"This Is the Way"	UK Singles Chart	56	3
1984	"It Makes Me Wonder"	UK Singles Chart	74	1
