= Irritant (band) =

English band

- Origin: Gloucester, England, United Kingdom
- Genres: Progressive rock, heavy metal
- Years active: 2002–2008
- Labels: Unsigned
- Members: Niall Thomas: Vocals, bass guitar Jack Williams: Rhythm guitar, acoustic guitar, backing vocals Will J. Rees: Lead guitar Dan Lee: Drums
- Past members: Pete Bright: Drums, percussion [as of 29 July 2007] James Piper: Rhythm guitar

Irritant were an English progressive rock / heavy metal band from Gloucester, formed in 2002. They originally described themselves as an "independent hard rock band", and flirted with rap, but developed a blend of progressive metal and hard rock. They cited among their influences Black Sabbath, Pink Floyd, Iron Maiden, Rush, Avenged Sevenfold, Guns N' Roses, AFI, 1980s metal and late 1960s progressive rock.

Their 2007 single "Voice of the Siren", described by the BBC as a "gargantuan rock classic", was produced by Vic Coppersmith-Heaven (who previously worked with Black Sabbath, The Jam, and The Rolling Stones) and reached No. 70 on the UK Singles Chart. The band split on 8 February 2008.

== Discography ==
=== Singles and EPs ===
- 2006 Old Bones; EP
- 2007 Good Evening From The Machine; EP
- 2007 "Voice of the Siren" UK No. 70; single
