= This Is the Modern World =

1977 studio album by the Jam

Studio album by the Jam
- Released: 18 November 1977
- Recorded: 25 August – 21 September 1977
- Studio: Basing Street, London
- Genre: New wave; punk rock; mod revival; rock
- Length: 31:19
- Label: Polydor
- Producer: Vic Coppersmith-Heaven; Chris Parry

The Jam chronology
In the City (1977)	This Is the Modern World (1977)	All Mod Cons (1978)

Singles from This Is the Modern World
- 1. "The Modern World" Released: 28 October 1977

This Is the Modern World is the second studio album by the English band the Jam, released on 18 November 1977 by Polydor Records. The album was released six months after their debut album In the City, and reached No. 22 on the UK Albums Chart.

Although generally met with negative reviews by music critics upon release, This Is the Modern World has been described as being an album "with far more light and shade" than In the City.

The only single from This Is the Modern World was the censored version of "The Modern World", which peaked at No. 36 on the UK singles chart.

== Cover photography ==
The photography for the album was taken by Gered Mankowitz and David Redfern. The front cover depicts the band standing beneath London's Westway.

== Critical reception ==
Professional ratings
Review scores
Source	Rating
AllMusic	3/5 stars
The Encyclopedia of Popular Music	3/5 stars
Pitchfork	8.0/10
Q	3/5 stars
Record Mirror	5/5 stars
The Rolling Stone Album Guide	2.5/5 stars
Spin Alternative Record Guide	6/10
The Village Voice	B+

The New York Times praised "the kind of ability to vary rock's basic signatures without departing from its stylistic essentials."

== Track listing ==
All tracks are written by Paul Weller, except where noted.

Side one
No.	Title	Writer(s)	Length
1.	"The Modern World"		2:31
2.	"London Traffic"	Bruce Foxton	1:49
3.	"Standards"		2:29
4.	"Life from a Window"		2:52
5.	"The Combine"		2:20
6.	"Don't Tell Them You're Sane"	Bruce Foxton	3:40

Side two
No.	Title	Writer(s)	Length
1.	"In the Street, Today"	Paul Weller, Dave Waller	1:31
2.	"London Girl"		2:40
3.	"I Need You (For Someone)"		2:41
4.	"Here Comes the Weekend"		3:30
5.	"Tonight at Noon"		3:01
6.	"In the Midnight Hour"	Steve Cropper, Wilson Pickett	1:54
Total length:			31:19

=== Original US release ===
1. "The Modern World"
2. "All Around the World"
3. "I Need You (For Someone)"
4. "London Traffic" (Bruce Foxton)
5. "Standards"
6. "Life from a Window"
7. "In the Midnight Hour" (Steve Cropper, Wilson Pickett)
8. "In the Street, Today" (Paul Weller, Dave Waller)
9. "London Girl"
10. "Here Comes the Weekend"
11. "The Combine"
12. "Tonight at Noon"
13. "Don't Tell Them You're Sane" (Bruce Foxton)

The US release had a different track order, included the "censored" single version of "The Modern World", and added the single "All Around the World" which was released in the UK between their first two albums. "All Around the World" had been their biggest UK hit to date, peaking at No. 13, a placement they would not match until 1979 when "The Eton Rifles" peaked at No. 3. Thereafter, no domestically released single by the Jam would ever reach a peak position lower than No. 4.

== Personnel ==
Credits are adapted from the album's liner notes.

The Jam

- Paul Weller – vocals, guitar, harmonica
- Bruce Foxton – bass guitar, vocals
- Rick Buckler – drums

Technical

- Vic Coppersmith-Heaven – production, engineering
- Chris Parry – production
- Hedgehog Design – artwork
- Conny Jude – illustration
- Bill Smith – art direction, design
- Gered Mankowitz – front cover photography
- David Redfern – back cover photography

== Charts ==
Chart (1977–78)	Peak position
UK Albums (OCC)	22
US Bubbling Under the Top LPs (Billboard)	1

== Certifications ==
Region	Certification	Certified units/sales
United Kingdom (BPI)	Silver	60,000^{^}
^{^} Shipments figures based on certification alone.
