= From the Jam =

English band

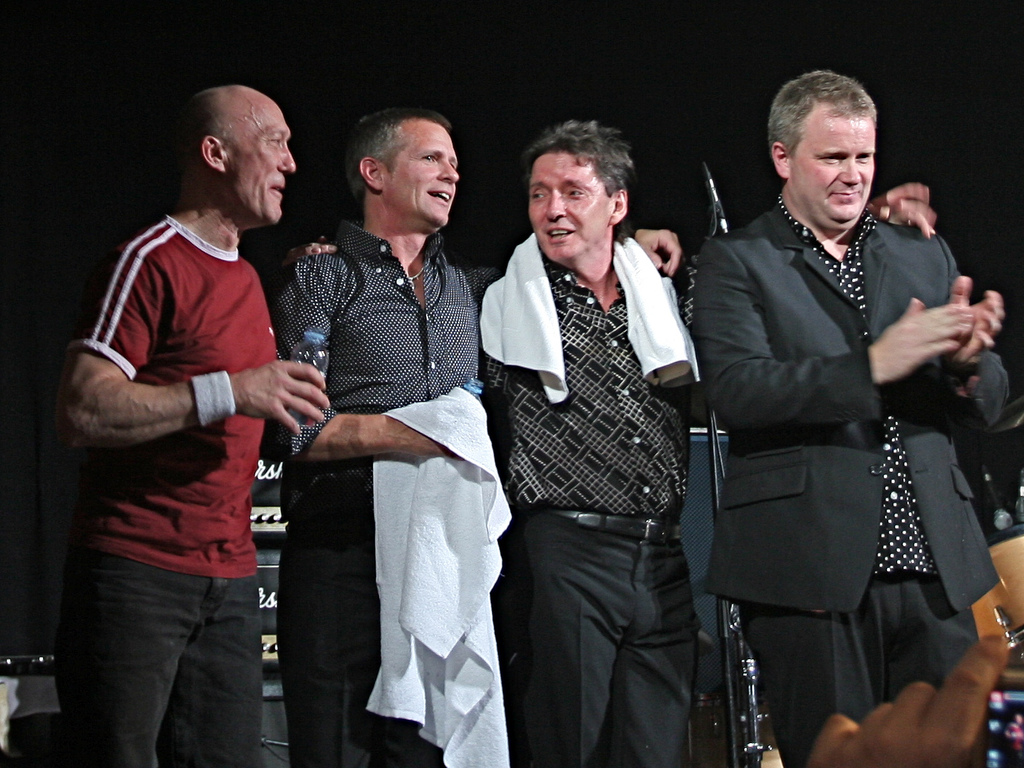
- Members of From the Jam in 2007, including Bruce Foxton and Rick Buckler

Background information
- Years active: 2007–present
- Spinoff of: The Jam
- Members: Russell Hastings; Mike Randon; Gary Simmons; Andy Fairclough
- Past members: Bruce Foxton; Rick Buckler; David Moore; Mark Brzezicki; Steve Barnard

From the Jam are an English band, formed in 2006 as the Gift by Rick Buckler, former drummer with the Jam, together with musicians Russell Hastings and David Moore. The band was named after the Jam's sixth and final studio album (1982), and plays material by that group.

In 2006, former Jam member Bruce Foxton performed on stage with the Gift, and later joined the band permanently as bassist; at this point the group changed its name to From the Jam.

In January 2025, From The Jam announced that due to Bruce Foxton’s health issues the final dates of the forthcoming Setting Sons tour would be Foxton's last performances with the group.

== History ==
=== The Gift (2006–2007) ===
In 2006, Rick Buckler formed a band named the Gift playing material from the Jam with musicians Russell Hastings and David Moore. Hastings, who spent many years as a local musician including a couple of years in a Jam tribute band, took on guitar and lead vocal duties. In 2006, Bruce Foxton performed on stage with the Gift at their concerts in Chichester, Brighton and Birmingham, which rekindled rumours of a full or partial reunion of the Jam in 2007, for the 30th anniversary of the band's signing.

=== From the Jam (2007–present) ===
Foxton stayed on as bassist with the Gift, with David Moore moving to second guitar and keyboards. At this point the group changed its name to From the Jam. In a 2007 official press release, Foxton and Buckler announced they were working on a new album and UK tour. The tour sold out in ten days. Weller did not take part, and has publicly expressed his lack of interest in any type of reformation.

From the Jam toured the UK in late 2007, finishing with a concert at Brighton Centre on 21 December 2007 to mark the 25th anniversary of the Jam's final show. In February 2008, they toured the United States and Canada, selling out in Los Angeles, San Francisco, Vancouver, Toronto, Chicago and New York. In March 2008, they toured Australia and New Zealand – a first for Foxton and Buckler.

A complete concert, recorded at the London Astoria in December 2007, was released on DVD through London-based indie label Invisible Hands Music in November 2008. Moore left the band in early 2009, releasing an album with Matt Douglass in April the following year on Invisible Hands Music, under the name the Squire Circle. Buckler announced his departure from the band in late 2009.

In 2012, a new album, Back in the Room, was released under Foxton's name to generally favourable reviews. The band featured Foxton (bass/vocals) and Hastings (guitar/vocals) with Mark Brzezicki of Big Country on drums. Released on Bass Tone Records, the album was recorded at Paul Weller's Black Barn studios, with Weller appearing on several tracks, including the lead single "Number Six". Other special guests on the album include Steve Cropper (Booker T and the M.G.'s) and Steve Norman (Spandau Ballet). A second single from the album, "Don't Waste My Time", was released on 28 April 2013.

Foxton collaborated with Hastings on the follow-up album, Smash the Clock, which was once again recorded at Black Barn studios; featuring Wilko Johnson and other guests, it was released on 18 March 2016. Foxton and Hastings released a further album, The Butterfly Effect, in October 2022.

== Personnel ==
=== The Gift ===
(2006–2007)

- Rick Buckler – drums, percussion
- Russell Hastings – vocals, guitar
- David Moore – bass, keyboards, guitar

Additional personnel

- Bruce Foxton – vocals, bass

=== From the Jam ===
(2007–present)

Current members

- Russell Hastings – vocals, guitar (2007–present)
- Mike Randon – drums, percussion (2014–present)
- Gary Simmons – percussion, bass (2024–present)

Other members

- Bruce Foxton – vocals, bass (2007–2025)
- Rick Buckler – drums, percussion (2007–2009, died 2025)
- David Moore – keyboards, guitar (2007–2009)
- Mark Brzezicki – drums, percussion (2009–2013, 2015)
- Steve Barnard – drums, percussion (2013–2014)

Additional personnel

- Simon Townshend – guitar; features in occasional live shows
- Andy Fairclough – keyboards
- Tom Van Heel – keyboards, guitar; session musician who features in live shows
