= All Around the World (The Jam song) =

1977 single by the Jam

"All Around The World"

Single by the Jam
- B-side: "Carnaby Street"
- Released: 15 July 1977
- Genre: Punk rock mod revival
- Length: 2:26
- Songwriters: Paul Weller ("All Around The World"), Bruce Foxton ("Carnaby Street")
- Producers: Vic Smith and Chris Parry

The Jam singles chronology
"In the City" (1977)	"All Around The World" (1977)	"The Modern World" (1977)

Music video
- "All Around the World" on YouTube

"All Around the World" was a single released by the Jam on 15 July 1977. It reached No. 13 in the UK Singles Chart.

The single was backed by the B-side, "Carnaby Street," and was released between the debut album, In the City, and the band's second album, This Is the Modern World.

== Track listing ==
No.	Title	Writer(s)	Length
1.	"All Around the World"	Paul Weller	2:26
2.	"Carnaby Street"	Bruce Foxton	2:28
Total length:			4:54
