= News of the World (song) =

1978 single by the Jam

Single by the Jam
- B-side: "Aunties and Uncles (Impulsive Youths)", "Innocent Man"
- Released: 3 March 1978
- Genre: Mod revival, new wave
- Length: 3:31
- Label: Polydor
- Songwriter: Bruce Foxton
- Producers: Vic Smith and Chris Parry

The Jam singles chronology
"The Modern World" (1977)	"News of the World" (1978)	"David Watts" / ""A" Bomb in Wardour Street" (1978)

Music video
- "News of the World" on Dailymotion

"News of the World" is a single by British group the Jam released on 3 March 1978. The single reached No. 27 in the UK Singles Chart. "Aunties and Uncles (Impulsive Youths)" and "Innocent Man" appeared as its B-sides. The title refers to the former British tabloid newspaper, News of the World.

"News of the World" is not included on any of the band's studio albums. It was written and sung by bass guitarist Bruce Foxton rather than the band's usual frontman Paul Weller. It was the only Jam single to be written by Foxton apart from "Funeral Pyre" which was co-written by all three band members.

The video for the single was filmed on the roof of Battersea Power Station in Battersea, London.

The song is used as the theme tune for the British satirical panel game Mock the Week.

== Track listing ==
All tracks are written by Bruce Foxton, except where noted.

No.	Title	Writer(s)	Length
1.	"News of the World"		3:31
2.	"Aunties and Uncles (Impulsive Youths)"	Paul Weller	2:35
3.	"Innocent Man"		4:20
Total length:			10:26
