= Strange Town =

1979 single by the Jam

Single by The Jam
- B-side: "The Butterfly Collector"
- Released: 9 March 1979
- Recorded: 1978
- Genre: Mod revival, power pop
- Length: 3:48
- Label: Polydor (UK)
- Songwriter: Paul Weller
- Producer: Vic Coppersmith-Heaven

The Jam singles chronology
| "Down in the Tube Station at Midnight" (1978) | "Strange Town" (1979) | "When You're Young" (1979) |

Rear cover
- Rear cover of Strange Town

Music video
- "Strange Town" on YouTube

"Strange Town" is a song by the Jam. The single was released on 9 March 1979 and reached No. 15 on the UK Singles Chart on 8 April. In 1983 it was certified Silver for 250,000 sales.

This single, backed by the Paul Weller-penned "The Butterfly Collector", does not appear on any of the band's studio albums, except the Canadian Polydor pressing of Setting Sons. "Strange Town" also appears on the greatest hits album Snap! "The Butterfly Collector" also appears in the 1996 The Jam Collection compilation album as well as on Snap!

The start of the promotional video for the single was filmed at the entrance to the underground section of London Victoria station.

== US release ==
The single was also released in the US in May 1979, as Polydor #14553. However, for the American release "The Butterfly Collector" was catalogued as the A-side. The single did not chart in the States. Pressings were issued on both see-through gold vinyl and standard black vinyl. The latter appears to be the less common variety, but neither edition is rare. Other than colour, there is no difference between the two issues. There was no picture sleeve for the US issue. Gold vinyl issues were packaged in a clear plastic sleeve. Black vinyl issues were marketed in standard Polydor house sleeves.

== "The Butterfly Collector" ==
The B-side, which Paul Weller wrote about NME music journalist Julie Burchill, was covered by Noel Gallagher with Weller at a Teenage Cancer Trust gig at the Royal Albert Hall in 2007. This track was also included on a CD of songs given away with 15 March 2009 edition of The Sunday Times. It has also been covered by Garbage as a b-side of the "Queer" single: that version was later included on the tribute album, Fire & Skill: The Songs of the Jam.

== Reception ==
The song was ranked at number five among the top "Tracks of the Year" for 1979 by NME. In a 2015 interview granted to Radio X, Paul Weller opined "Strange Town" as one of the three best songs he has written in his entire career.

== Track listing ==
A. "Strange Town" – 3:48
B. "The Butterfly Collector" – 3:11
