= Freak (Bruce Foxton song) =

Single by Bruce Foxton

from the album Touch Sensitive
- Released: 30 July 1983
- Genre: Rock; new wave
- Length: 3:28
- Label: Arista
- Songwriter(s): Bruce Foxton
- Producer(s): Steve Lillywhite

Bruce Foxton singles chronology
| "Freak" (1983) | "This Is the Way" (1983) |

"Freak" is the debut single by the English rock singer-songwriter and bass guitarist Bruce Foxton, which became a hit and one of his most recognizable songs. It was released on 30 July, 1983, as the lead single from his debut studio album, Touch Sensitive. It was inspired strongly by the 1980 biographical film The Elephant Man, with the single's cover even referencing the film's posters.

It was one of four tracks from the album that were produced by the multiple-award winning Steve Lillywhite. The song is notably Foxton's only single to make the Top 40 in the United Kingdom, peaking at 23, for a total of five weeks.

== Personnel ==
Credits are adapted from the single's back cover.

- Bruce Foxton – lead vocals, bass guitar
- Pete Glenister – guitars
- Adrian Lillywhite – drums
- Anthony Thistlethwaite – saxophone
- Roddy Lorimer – trumpet
- Jackie Challenor – backing vocals
- Lorenza Johnson – backing vocals
- Mae McKenna – backing vocals

== Chart performance ==
| Chart (1983) | Peak position |
|---|---|
| UK Singles Chart | 23 |
