= Sound Affects =

1980 studio album by the Jam

Studio album by the Jam
- Released: 28 November 1980
- Recorded: 15 June – 22 October 1980
- Studios: The Town House, London
- Genres: Post-punk; psychedelic pop
- Length: 35:18
- Label: Polydor
- Producers: The Jam; Vic Coppersmith-Heaven

The Jam chronology
Setting Sons (1979)	Sound Affects (1980)	The Gift (1982)

Singles from Sound Affects
- 1. "Start!" Released: 15 August 1980; 2. "That's Entertainment" Released: 7 February 1981

Sound Affects is the fifth studio album by the English rock band the Jam. The album was released on 28 November 1980 by Polydor Records. It is the only Jam album to be co-produced by the band themselves, and contains the only album track co-written by the entire band, "Music for the Last Couple".

The cover art is a pastiche of the artwork used on various Sound Effects records produced by the BBC during the 1970s.

Jam frontman Paul Weller has opined that Sound Affects is the Jam's best album.

== Influences ==
Noted musical influences on Sound Affects include post-punk groups such as Wire, Gang of Four, and Joy Division and, particularly evident in Rick Buckler's drumming, Michael Jackson's Off the Wall. Paul Weller has freely admitted that the Beatles' Revolver was a major influence on much of the material on Sound Affects. At the time of its release, he said that he considered the album a cross between Off the Wall and Revolver.

"Start!" is built around an almost exact copy of the bass-line from the Beatles' "Taxman", the first track on Revolver, and includes a homage to its guitar solo. "Pretty Green" includes a funk bass-line and rhythm with melodic guitar breaks and psychedelic sound effects.

== Packaging and artwork ==
The front cover of Sound Affects is inspired by the series of Sound Effects albums created by the BBC Radiophonic Workshop, and features pictures of a taxi cab (likely an Austin FX4), a telephone box, a hearse, the phrase 'From the cradle to the grave' (associated with the welfare state), and Dungeness B power station, among others.

The back cover of the album features an excerpt from Percy Bysshe Shelley's poem The Masque of Anarchy.

== Release ==
Sound Affects sold over 100,000 copies and spent 19 weeks on the UK Albums Chart, rising to number two in late 1980. In the United States, the album spent 11 weeks on the Billboard 200 chart and reached its peak position of number 72 in February 1981, the highest position reached by any of the band's albums on the US charts.

The album features the group's second UK number one single, "Start!". Polydor pushed for "Pretty Green" to be the first single released, but Weller insisted on "Start!". This involved consulting a few of the band's friends as to what they thought the best release would be. Weller had Polydor A&R man Dennis Munday ask a small peer group of his friends who had been present throughout the recording sessions at the Town House and prior demo recordings at Polydor Studios. Given the choice, they selected "Start!" as the best single release and the decision was made to release it. The decision was vindicated when "Start!" topped the British singles charts in its third week after entering at number three.

Sound Affects was reissued on 8 November 2010 as a two-CD deluxe edition to celebrate its 30th anniversary. The 2010 reissue also charted in the UK, reaching number 63 in November of that year.

== Reception ==
Professional ratings
Review scores
Source	Rating
AllMusic	5/5 stars
Classic Rock	9/10
Encyclopedia of Popular Music	5/5 stars
Mojo	5/5 stars
Q	4/5 stars
Record Collector	4/5 stars
The Rolling Stone Album Guide	5/5 stars
Spin	4.5/5 stars
Spin Alternative Record Guide	10/10
Uncut	4/5 stars

Record Mirror ranked it the best album of 1980.

In 2006, Q placed Sound Affects at number 15 on its list of the "40 Best Albums of the '80s". In 2013, NME ranked Sound Affects at number 487 on its list of the 500 greatest albums of all time. In 2020, Rolling Stone included Sound Affects in their "80 Greatest albums of 1980" list, praising the band for crafting their "finest album", while encapsulating "the classic English songcraft of the Kinks and the Small Faces, singing about working-class anger". The album was also included in the book 1001 Albums You Must Hear Before You Die.

In BBC Radio 6 Music's documentary The Jam: Made in Britain, Paul Weller cited Sound Affects as his favourite Jam album.

== Track listing ==
All tracks are written by Paul Weller, except where noted.

Side one
No.	Title	Length
1.	"Pretty Green"	2:37
2.	"Monday"	3:02
3.	"But I'm Different Now"	1:52
4.	"Set the House Ablaze"	5:03
5.	"Start!"	2:33
6.	"That's Entertainment"	3:38

Side two
No.	Title	Length
1.	"Dream Time"	3:54
2.	"Man in the Corner Shop"	3:12
3.	"Music for the Last Couple" (Rick Buckler, Bruce Foxton, Paul Weller)	3:45
4.	"Boy About Town"	2:00
5.	"Scrape Away"	3:59

== US LP Track listing ==
Side one
No.	Title	Length
1.	"Start!"	2:33
2.	"Pretty Green"	2:37
3.	"Monday"	3:02
4.	"But I'm Different Now"	1:52
5.	"Set The House Ablaze"	5:03
6.	"That's Entertainment"	3:38

Side two
No.	Title	Length
1.	"Dream Time"	3:54
2.	"Man in the Corner Shop"	3:12
3.	"Music for the Last Couple" (Rick Buckler, Bruce Foxton, Paul Weller)	3:45
4.	"Boy About Town"	2:00
5.	"Scrape Away"	3:59

=== Deluxe track listing ===
CD1 as per original release

Track listing CD2

1. Start! (Single Version) – 2:20
2. Liza Radley – 2:34
3. Dreams Of Children – 2:59
4. That's Entertainment (Alternative) – 3:24
5. Pretty Green (Demo) – 2:38
6. Pop Art Poem – 2:10
7. Rain (Demo) written by John Lennon & Paul McCartney – 2:58
8. Boy About Town (Demo) – 2:18
9. Dream Time (Demo) – 1:52
10. Dead End Street (Demo) written by Ray Davies – 3:15
11. But I'm Different Now (Demo) – 1:57
12. Scrape Away (Instrumental) – 3:59
13. Start! (Demo) – 2:17
14. Liza Radley (Demo) – 2:18
15. And Your Bird Can Sing (Demo) written by John Lennon & Paul McCartney – 1:54
16. Monday (Alternative) – 4:20
17. Get Yourself Together (Demo) written by Ronnie Lane & Steve Marriott – 2:00
18. Set the House Ablaze (Alternative) – 4:47
19. Boy About Town (Alternative) – 2:14
20. No One In The World (Demo) – 2:24
21. 'Instrumental' (Demo) – 2:54
22. Waterloo Sunset (Demo) written by Ray Davies – 3:59
- "Start!" was the first track on side one of the US issue. This issue also included the "Going Underground" / "Dreams of Children" 7".
- On the Canadian issue (Polydor PD-1-6315), "Start!" and "Pretty Green" were switched.
- Pop Art Poem was first released on flexidisc free with Flexipop magazine

== Personnel ==
Credits are adapted from the album's liner notes and AllMusic.

The Jam

- Paul Weller – guitar, vocals, keyboards, sitar
- Bruce Foxton – bass guitar, vocals
- Rick Buckler – drums, percussion

Technical

- The Jam – production, sleeve design
- Vic Coppersmith-Heaven – production
- George Chambers – assistant engineering
- Alan Douglas – engineering
- Bill Smith – sleeve design
- Andrew Douglas – photography
- Martyn Goddard – photography
- Andrew Rosen – photography
- Pennie Smith – photography
- Laurent Locher – French spoken vocals on 'Scrape Away'

== Charts ==
=== Weekly charts ===
Chart (1980–81)	Peak position
Australian Albums (Kent Music Report)	53
Canada Top Albums/CDs (RPM)	39
Finnish Albums (Soumen Virallinen)	27
New Zealand Albums (RMNZ)	2
Swedish Albums (Sverigetopplistan)	17
UK Albums (Official Charts)	2
US Billboard 200	72

Chart (2026)	Peak position
Greek Albums (IFPI)	64

=== Year-end charts ===
Chart (1981)	Position
New Zealand Albums (RMNZ)	38

== Certifications ==
Region	Certification	Certified units/sales
United Kingdom (BPI)	Gold	100,000^{^}
^{^} Shipments figures based on certification alone.
