= Setting Sons =

1979 album by The Jam

Studio album by the Jam
- Released: 16 November 1979
- Recorded: 15 August – 10 October 1979
- Studios: Townhouse, Shepherd's Bush, London
- Genres: Mod revival; new wave; power pop; punk rock
- Length: 32:31
- Label: Polydor
- Producer: Vic Coppersmith-Heaven

The Jam chronology
All Mod Cons (1978)	Setting Sons (1979)	Sound Affects (1980)

Singles from Setting Sons
- 1. "The Eton Rifles" Released: 26 October 1979

Setting Sons is the fourth studio album by the English rock band the Jam, released on 16 November 1979 by Polydor Records. It reached No. 4 in the UK Albums Chart upon the first week of release, continuing the commercial (and critical) favour that had begun with their previous album All Mod Cons (1978).

The sole single from Setting Sons, "The Eton Rifles", became the group's first top 10 UK hit, peaking at No. 3.

== Recording and content ==
In contrast to its pop-oriented predecessor, Setting Sons features a much harder, tougher production, albeit with the emphasis on melody common throughout the Jam's discography. Singer, guitarist and songwriter Paul Weller originally conceived Setting Sons as a concept album detailing the lives of three boyhood friends who later reunite as adults after an unspecified war, only to discover they have grown both up and apart. This concept was never fully developed and it remains unclear which tracks were originally intended as part of the story, although it is commonly agreed that "Thick as Thieves", "Little Boy Soldiers", "Wasteland" and "Burning Sky" are likely constituents; extant Jam bootlegs feature a version of "Little Boy Soldiers" split into three separate recordings, possible evidence that the song was intended to serve as a recurring motif, with separate sections appearing between other songs on the album. Weller's lyrics on the album were increasingly written from a socialist perspective, influenced by his reading of works such as George Orwell's Homage to Catalonia and Robert Tressell's The Ragged-Trousered Philanthropists.

The album was musically ambitious as well. "Little Boy Soldiers" consists of several movements, reminiscent of compositions by The Kinks. "Wasteland" unconventionally features a recorder. Even more striking is Bruce Foxton's "Smithers-Jones". The song was originally released as the B-side of the non-LP single "When You're Young" three months before the album's release; on Setting Sons it is re-recorded in an all-strings arrangement (provided by former Procol Harum and Whitesnake organist Peter Solley and credited to The Jam Philharmonic Orchestra, but played by session musicians), save a little electric guitar in the coda. According to the liner notes of the Direction Reaction Creation box set, the revamping of "Smithers-Jones" was suggested by drummer Rick Buckler.

The liner notes also imply that the album was a somewhat rushed effort, which may explain why the original underlying concept was not fully developed, as well as the inclusion of one cover song and two prior releases: "Smithers-Jones" had already been released; "Heat Wave" is a cover of the Martha and the Vandellas' Motown hit. Since "The Eton Rifles" was released in advance of the LP for promotional purposes, this leaves only seven entirely new original songs on the album. Producer Vic Coppersmith-Heaven has noted that Polydor wanted the album to be in the shops for the band's next scheduled tour, resulting in him feeling "enormously pressurised".

== International releases ==
The Polydor Canada LP release of Setting Sons is substantially different from the original UK version, and contains 12 tracks.

The Polydor US LP release in 1979 reversed the sides and inserted the single "Strange Town" as the second song on side two, between "Girl on the Phone" and "Thick As Thieves".

== Album cover ==
The album cover art features a photograph of Benjamin Clemens' bronze sculpture The St John's Ambulance Bearers. Cast in 1919, it depicts a wounded soldier being carried by two ambulance workers. The sculpture is currently in the possession of the Imperial War Museum in London.

== Reception ==
Professional ratings
Review scores
Source	Rating
AllMusic	5/5 stars
The Encyclopedia of Popular Music	4/5 stars
The Irish Times	4/5 stars
Record Mirror	5/5 stars
(The New) Rolling Stone Album Guide	3/5 stars
Smash Hits	9/10
Spin Alternative Record Guide	5/10
Uncut	8/10
The Village Voice	B+

Setting Sons remains one of the Jam's most critically favoured works, alongside All Mod Cons and Sound Affects. The Manchester Evening News praised the "excellent songwriting [and] imaginative and creative production". The Globe and Mail noted that "Setting Sons isn't commercial new wave, a la Joe Jackson or Elvis Costello, but it is relentless and honest".

AllMusic critic Chris Woodstra found that "Setting Sons often reaches brilliance and stands among The Jam's best albums" and, apart from "a number of throwaways and knockoffs (especially the out-of-place cover of 'Heat Wave' which closes the album)", is "an otherwise perfect album." Setting Sons was ranked the fourth best album of 1979 by NME, with "The Eton Rifles" and "Strange Town" ranked at numbers one and five among the year's top tracks.

== Track listings ==
=== Original UK edition ===
All songs by Paul Weller except as noted.

Side one

1. "Girl on the Phone" – 2:55
2. "Thick as Thieves" – 3:38
3. "Private Hell" – 3:49
4. "Little Boy Soldiers" – 3:32
5. "Wasteland" – 2:50

Side two

1. "Burning Sky" – 3:30
2. "Smithers-Jones" (Bruce Foxton) – 2:59
3. "Saturday's Kids" – 2:51
4. "The Eton Rifles" – 3:57
5. "Heat Wave" (Holland-Dozier-Holland) – 2:24

=== Polydor Canada edition ===
Side one

1. "Strange Town"
2. "Saturday's Kids"
3. "Little Boy Soldiers"
4. "The Eton Rifles"
5. "Girl on the Phone"
6. "Heat Wave" (Holland-Dozier-Holland)

Side two

1. "Smithers-Jones" (Bruce Foxton)
2. "Private Hell"
3. "The Butterfly Collector"
4. "Burning Sky"
5. "Thick as Thieves"
6. "Wasteland"

=== Polydor US edition ===
Side one

1. "Burning Sky"
2. "Smithers Jones" (Bruce Foxton)
3. "Saturday's Kids"
4. "The Eton Rifles"
5. "(Love Is Like a) Heatwave" (Holland-Dozier-Holland)

Side two

1. "Girl on the Phone"
2. "Strange Town"
3. "Thick as Thieves"
4. "Private Hell"
5. "Little Boy Soldiers"
6. "Wasteland"

=== 2001 CD edition ===
1. "Girl on the Phone"
2. "Thick as Thieves"
3. "Private Hell"
4. "Little Boy Soldiers"
5. "Wasteland"
6. "Burning Sky"
7. "Smithers-Jones" (Bruce Foxton)
8. "Saturday's Kids"
9. "The Eton Rifles"
10. "Heat Wave" (Holland-Dozier-Holland)
11. "Strange Town"
12. "When You're Young"
13. "Smithers-Jones (single version)" (Bruce Foxton)
14. "See-Saw"
15. "Going Underground"
16. "The Dreams of Children"
17. "So Sad About Us" (Pete Townshend)
18. "Hey Mister"
19. "Start"

== Personnel ==
The Jam

- Paul Weller – vocals, guitars, Hammond organ on "The Eton Rifles"
- Bruce Foxton – bass guitar, vocals
- Rick Buckler – drums

Additional musicians

- "Merton" Mick – piano
- Rudi – saxophone
- The Jam Philharmonic Orchestra – cello, timpani, recorder
- Pete Solley – score for strings
- Uncredited fans of the band – crowd vocals on "The Eton Rifles"

Technical

- Vic Coppersmith-Heaven – production
- Alan Douglas – engineering
- George Chambers – assistant engineering
- Bill Smith – art direction, design
- Andrew Douglas – front cover photography

== Chart performance ==
Setting Sons spent 19 weeks on the UK Albums Chart, rising to No. 4. In the United States, the album spent eight weeks on the Billboard 200 chart and reached its peak position of No. 137 in March 1980.

The 2014 re-release also charted in the UK, reaching No. 97 in November of that year.

Chart (1979–80)	Peak position
Australian Albums (Kent Music Report)	70
Canada Top Albums/CDs (RPM)	75
New Zealand Albums (RMNZ)	14
UK Albums (Official Charts)	4
US Billboard 200	137

== Certifications ==
Region	Certification	Certified units/sales
United Kingdom (BPI)	Gold	100,000^{^}
^{^} Shipments figures based on certification alone.
