= All Mod Cons =

1978 album by the Jam

Studio album by the Jam
- Released: 3 November 1978
- Recorded: 4 July – 17 August 1978
- Studios: RAK and Eden, London
- Genres: New wave; mod revival; punk rock; power pop
- Length: 37:28
- Label: Polydor
- Producer: Vic Coppersmith-Heaven

The Jam chronology
This Is the Modern World (1977)	All Mod Cons (1978)	Setting Sons (1979)

Singles from All Mod Cons
- 1. "David Watts"/"'A' Bomb in Wardour Street" Released: 11 August 1978; 2. "Down in the Tube Station at Midnight" Released: 13 October 1978

All Mod Cons is the third studio album by the English band the Jam, released on 3 November 1978 by Polydor Records. The title, a British idiom one might find in housing advertisements, is short for "all modern conveniences" and is a pun on the band's association with the mod revival. The cover is a visual joke showing the band in a bare room. The album reached No. 6 in the UK Albums Chart.

The album was reissued in the United States in 1979, with the song "The Butterfly Collector" replacing "Billy Hunt".

== Background and music ==
"I'd found my feet. After This Is the Modern World, I thought, 'am I going to let this slide or fight against it?' My back was against the wall. It was a matter of self-pride".

— Paul Weller, reflecting on his mindset between This Is the Modern World and All Mod Cons in a 1998 interview with Uncut magazine.

Following the release of their second album, This Is the Modern World, the Jam undertook a 1978 tour of the US supporting American rock band Blue Öyster Cult. The Jam were not well received on the tour and This Is the Modern World failed to reach the Billboard 200 chart. Under pressure from their record company, Polydor, to deliver a hit record, songwriter Paul Weller was suffering from writer's block when the band returned to the UK. Weller admitted to a lack of interest during the writing/recording process, and had to completely re-record a new set of songs for the album after producer Chris Parry rejected the first batch as being sub-standard. All Mod Cons was more commercially successful than This Is the Modern World.

British Invasion pop influences run through the album, most obviously in the cover of The Kinks' "David Watts". The single "Down in the Tube Station at Midnight", which Weller had originally discarded because he was unhappy with the song's arrangement, was rescued from the studio bin by producer Vic Coppersmith and became one of the band's most successful chart hits up to that point, peaking at number 15 on the UK Singles Chart. The song is a first-person narrative of a young man who walks into a tube station on the way home to his wife, and is beaten by far right thugs. The lyrics of the song "To Be Someone (Didn't We Have a Nice Time)" criticised fickle people who attach themselves to people who enjoy success and leave them once that is over.

"Class issues were very important to me at that time ..." said Weller. "Woking has a bit of a stockbroker belt on its outskirts. So I had those images – people catching the train to Waterloo to go to the city. 'Mr Clean' was my view of that."

All Mod Cons was reissued on CD in 2006, featuring a second disc of b-sides, outtakes and unreleased demos and a DVD containing a 40-minute documentary directed by Don Letts.

== Reception ==
Professional ratings
Review scores
Source	Rating
AllMusic	5/5 stars
The Encyclopedia of Popular Music	5/5 stars
Mojo	5/5 stars
Q	4/5 stars
The Rolling Stone Album Guide	4.5/5 stars
Sounds	5/5 stars
Spin	4.5/5 stars
Spin Alternative Record Guide	8/10
The Village Voice	B

In his review for NME, Charles Shaar Murray said that All Mod Cons was "not only several light years ahead of anything they've done before but also the album that's going to catapult the Jam right into the front rank of international rock and roll; one of the handful of truly essential rock albums of the last few years." Sounds critic Garry Bushell hailed it as the Jam's "statement of artistic triumph, musical maturation and compositional strength". Dave Schulps of Trouser Press stated that "All Mod Cons firmly establishes Paul Weller (and the Jam) as a major talent (and band) for the '80s." The Globe and Mail deemed the album "sober, topical rock and roll with a touch of pop tunefulness that sneaks out from the metallic sounds and martial rhythms to add a note of levity".

NME ranked All Mod Cons as the second best album of 1978 in its end of year review.

In 2000, Q placed All Mod Cons at number 50 on its list of the "100 Greatest British Albums Ever". In 2013, NME ranked All Mod Cons at number 219 on its list of the 500 greatest albums of all time. The album is listed in the reference book 1001 Albums You Must Hear Before You Die.

== Track listing ==
All songs written by Paul Weller except "David Watts" written by Ray Davies.

Side one

1. "All Mod Cons" – 1:20
2. "To Be Someone (Didn't We Have a Nice Time)" – 2:32
3. "Mr. Clean" – 3:29
4. "David Watts" – 2:56
5. "English Rose"* – 2:51
6. "In the Crowd" – 5:40

Side two

1. "Billy Hunt" – 3:01 [UK and 1st US pressings] "The Butterfly Collector" – 3:11 [US reissues]
2. "It's Too Bad" – 2:39
3. "Fly" – 3:22
4. "The Place I Love" – 2:54
5. "'A' Bomb in Wardour Street" – 2:37
6. "Down in the Tube Station at Midnight" – 4:43

*Neither the title nor lyrics of "English Rose" were printed on the original vinyl release of All Mod Cons due to Weller's feeling that the song's lyrics did not mean much without the music behind them.

== Personnel ==
The Jam

- Paul Weller – vocals, guitars, piano, harmonica
- Bruce Foxton – vocals, bass guitar
- Rick Buckler – drums, percussion

Technical

- Vic Coppersmith-Heaven – production, soundboard engineering
- Chris Parry – associate production
- Roger Béchirian – soundboard engineering
- Gregg Jackman – soundboard engineering
- Peter Schierwade – assistant engineering
- Phil Thornalley – assistant engineering
- Bill Smith – design
- The Jam – design
- Peter "Kodick" Gravelle – photography

== Charts ==
Chart (1978–79)	Peak position
UK Albums (Official Charts)	6
US Bubbling Under the Top LPs (Billboard)	4

Chart (2026)	Peak position
Greek Albums (IFPI)	68

== Certifications ==
Region	Certification	Certified units/sales
United Kingdom (BPI)	Gold	100,000^{^}
^{^} Shipments figures based on certification alone.
