= In the City (The Jam album) =

1977 studio album by The Jam

Studio album by the Jam
- Released: 20 May 1977
- Recorded: March 1977
- Studios: Stratford Place, London, W1
- Genres: Punk rock; mod revival
- Length: 32:02
- Label: Polydor
- Producers: Vic Coppersmith-Heaven; Chris Parry

The Jam chronology
In the City (1977)	This Is the Modern World (1977)

Singles from In the City
- 1. "In the City" Released: 29 April 1977

In the City is the debut studio album by the English band the Jam. Released in May 1977 by Polydor Records, the album reached No. 20 on the UK Albums Chart.

The album features the band's debut single and title track "In the City". In addition, the album includes two cover versions, "Slow Down" and the theme to the 1960s television series, Batman, the latter of which had also been previously covered by the Who, the Kinks and Link Wray.

== Critical reception ==
Professional ratings
Review scores
Source	Rating
AllMusic	4.5/5 stars
Christgau's Record Guide	A−
The Encyclopedia of Popular Music	4/5 stars
Pitchfork	8.5/10
Q	4/5 stars
Record Mirror	5/5 stars
The Rolling Stone Album Guide	4/5 stars
Spin Alternative Record Guide	8/10

Upon its release, In the City received all-round positive reviews. Phil McNeil from the NME said that Paul Weller's songwriting "captures that entire teen frustration vibe with the melodic grace and dynamic aplomb of early Kinks and Who". Brian Harrigan of Melody Maker was equally impressed, remarking that Weller's songs "are anything but an embarrassment" and that "he has a deft touch that places his material on a much higher plateau". In Record Mirror, Barry Cain opined: "Armed and extremely dangerous The Jam stalk the decrepit grooves... if you don't like them hard luck coz they're gonna be around for a long time... It's been a long time since albums actually reflected pre-20 delusions". Village Voice critic Robert Christgau said that the band "can put a song together; they're both powerful enough to subsume their sources and fresh enough to keep me coming back for more."

== Track listing ==
All tracks are written by Paul Weller, except where noted.

Side one
No.	Title	Length
1.	"Art School"	2:02
2.	"I've Changed My Address"	3:31
3.	"Slow Down" (Larry Williams)	2:39
4.	"I Got By in Time"	2:07
5.	"Away from the Numbers"	4:03
6.	"Batman Theme" (Neal Hefti)	1:31

Side two
No.	Title	Length
1.	"In the City"	2:19
2.	"Sounds from the Street"	3:14
3.	"Non-Stop Dancing"	2:28
4.	"Time for Truth"	3:10
5.	"Takin' My Love"	2:15
6.	"Bricks and Mortar"	2:37
Total length:		32:02

== Personnel ==
Credits are adapted from the album's liner notes.

The Jam

- Paul Weller – guitar, vocals
- Bruce Foxton – bass, vocals
- Rick Buckler – drums

Technical

- Vic Coppersmith-Heaven – production, engineering
- Chris Parry – production
- Allen Landau – mastering
- Bill Smith – art direction, design
- Martyn Goddard – front cover photography
- Wade Wood Associates – artwork

== Charts ==
Chart (1977)	Peak position
UK Albums (Official Charts)	20

== Certifications ==
Region	Certification	Certified units/sales
United Kingdom (BPI)	Silver	60,000^{‡}
^{‡} Sales+streaming figures based on certification alone.
