= David Watts (song) =

1967 single by the Kinks

- B-side label of US single

Single by the Kinks

from the album Something Else by the Kinks
- A-side: "Autumn Almanac"
- Released: 29 November 1967
- Recorded: February 1967
- Studio: Pye, London
- Genre: Rock
- Length: 2:27
- Label: Reprise
- Songwriter: Ray Davies
- Producer: Ray Davies

The Kinks US singles chronology
"Waterloo Sunset" (1967)	"Autumn Almanac" / "David Watts" (1967)	"Wonderboy" (1968)

"David Watts" is a song written by Ray Davies that originally appeared on the Kinks' 1967 album Something Else by the Kinks. It was also the American and Continental Europe B-side to "Autumn Almanac". It has been included on several compilation albums, including The Kink Kronikles (1972) and a live version recorded at Landmark Theatre in Syracuse, New York, 4 March 1980 was included on One for the Road, a double live album released in June 1980.

== Background ==
The song is about the singer's great admiration of fellow schoolboy David Watts, who appears to have a "charmed life". There is an undercurrent of either deep envy or, as AllMusic put it, "a schoolboy crush". It is also, as Jon Savage has written, one of Ray Davies' "sharpest homoerotic songs". Despite this, Davies has commented that he sought to keep the lyric ambiguous: "When it comes to songs like 'See My Friends' or 'David Watts', I like to leave their meaning open. In [my] book, I wrote about how 'David Watts' is about a gay guy but part of the thing also is like having admiration for the head boy in school. I try not to come down on one side, or the other".

As Ray Davies confirmed in The Kinks: The Official Biography by Savage, "David Watts is a real person. He was a concert promoter in Rutland." He goes on to relate how the real Watts was gay and demonstrated an obvious romantic interest in his brother Dave Davies. In this light, lines such as "he is so gay and fancy free" and "all the girls in the neighbourhood try to go out with David Watts ... but can't succeed" provide a second level of interpretation based on this ironic in-joke.

The band members were invited back to Watts' home for a drink one night after a concert. Ray Davies recalled to Q magazine in a 2016 interview: "My brother, Dave, was in a flamboyant mood and I could see that David Watts had a crush on him. So I tried to persuade Dave to marry David Watts because he was connected with Rutland brewery. See, that's how stupid my brain was." (Chuckles silently) "I thought: if I can get Dave fixed up with this Watts guy, I'll be set up for life and get all the ale I want. But the song's really about complete envy. It was based on someone else entirely – the head boy at my school. He was captain of the team, all those things, but I can't tell you his real name as I only spoke to him a few months ago."

== The Jam version ==
"David Watts"
- Picture sleeve

Single by the Jam

from the album All Mod Cons
- A-side: "'A' Bomb in Wardour Street" (double A-side)
- Released: 11 August 1978
- Genre: Mod revival
- Length: 2:53
- Label: Polydor
- Songwriter: Ray Davies
- Producers: Vic Smith, Chris Parry

The Jam singles chronology
"News of the World" (1978)	"David Watts" / "'A' Bomb in Wardour Street" (1978)	"Down in the Tube Station at Midnight" (1978)

The song was later covered by the Jam, who released it on 11 August 1978 as a single, then included it on their third studio album, All Mod Cons (with different mixes used for the single and album versions). This version, which reached No. 25 in the UK singles chart, featured bassist Bruce Foxton on lead vocals rather than Paul Weller, as it was not in the right key for the Jam frontman. The track was released as a double A-side along with "'A' Bomb in Wardour Street", of which a distinct, slightly shorter version was used for the single release and which would also appear later that year on All Mod Cons.

== Personnel ==
According to band researcher Doug Hinman:

The Kinks

- Ray Davies – lead vocal, acoustic guitar
- Dave Davies – backing vocal, electric guitar
- Pete Quaife – backing vocal, bass
- Mick Avory – drums

Additional musician

- Nicky Hopkins – piano
