= When You're Young (The Jam song) =

Single by The Jam
- B-side: "Smithers-Jones"
- Released: 17 August 1979
- Genre: Mod revival, power pop
- Length: 3:12
- Label: Polydor (UK)
- Songwriter: Paul Weller
- Producers: Vic Coppersmith-Heaven and the Jam

The Jam singles chronology
"Strange Town" (1979)	"When You're Young" (1979)	"The Eton Rifles" (1979)

Back of the single cover

Music video
- "When You're Young" on YouTube

"When You're Young" was the eighth single released by the Jam. The single was released on 17 August 1979, and charted at number 17 in the UK Singles Chart on 8 September. The B-Side of the single, "Smithers-Jones", is a guitar-based recording of this song, as opposed to the all-strings arrangement composed at the suggestion of the band's drummer, Rick Buckler, and included on the reissue of their fourth album, Setting Sons.

== Release ==
"When You're Young" was not included upon any of the Jam's albums at the time of their original release, although both tracks ("When You're Young" and "Smithers-Jones") were included as bonus tracks upon the 2001 re-release of Setting Sons. In addition, the song has been included upon several Jam compilation albums, including The Very Best of The Jam.

The single's promotional video was filmed in Queens Park, North West London.

== B-side ==
"Smithers-Jones", written by Bruce Foxton, was the B-side of "When You're Young". It was re-worked with an all-strings arrangement at the suggestion of the band's drummer, Rick Buckler, for inclusion in the band's fourth album, Setting Sons, released in November 1979. "Smithers-Jones" has been considered to be Foxton's finest songwriting contribution to The Jam, with the lyrical inspiration drawing from Foxton's own father, who had decided to retire upon being made redundant.
