= Funeral Pyre =

1981 single by The Jam

Single by The Jam
- B-side: "Disguises"
- Released: 29 May 1981
- Genre: Mod revival; post-punk
- Length: 3:29
- Label: Polydor
- Songwriters: Rick Buckler, Bruce Foxton and Paul Weller
- Producers: Peter Wilson; The Jam

The Jam singles chronology
"That's Entertainment" (1981)	"Funeral Pyre" (1981)	"Absolute Beginners" (1981)

Music video
- "Funeral Pyre" on YouTube

"Funeral Pyre" is The Jam's thirteenth single released on 29 May 1981. Backed by the B-side "Disguises", a cover of a Who track, it reached No. 4 in the UK singles chart.

"Funeral Pyre" is the only single co-written by the band, and only the second song which has writing credits for all three members, the other being "Music for the Last Couple" which featured on the Sound Affects album.

The song begins as a studio jam between drummer Rick Buckler and bassist Bruce Foxton, with Paul Weller's contribution coming later.

The song does not appear on any of the band's studio albums. In the US, it appeared on the five-track EP The Jam (Polydor PX-1-503), which peaked at No. 176 on the Billboard 200 album chart.

== Music video ==
The video was shot at Horsell Common, near Woking. A sandpit (which had earlier featured in H. G. Wells' The War of the Worlds) was used for the location of the bonfire used to accompany the official music video.
