= Beat Surrender =

Single by The Jam

from the album Snap!
- B-side: "Shopping"
- Released: 22 November 1982
- Genre: Post-punk
- Length: 3:25
- Label: Polydor (UK)
- Songwriter: Paul Weller
- Producer: Peter Wilson

The Jam singles chronology
"The Bitterest Pill (I Ever Had to Swallow)" (1982)	"Beat Surrender" (1982)

"Beat Surrender" was the Jam's final single, and was released on 22 November 1982. It became the band's fourth and last No. 1 hit in the UK Singles Chart for two weeks in December 1982.

== Title ==
The song's title was a play on words combining the title of the 1979 Anita Ward disco single "Sweet Surrender", with the British traditional military term of "Beating Retreat", signalling a withdrawal.

== Background ==
Paul Weller wrote the song to mark the end of the group, which he disbanded shortly after the single's release. "I wanted it to be a statement, a final clarion call saying: Right, we're stopping, you take it on from here."

For bassist Bruce Foxton, the single's commercial success made the breakup more discouraging: "That was our fourth Number One. It was very emotional for myself and I can't talk for Rick [Buckler] but I’d imagine... he didn't want the band to split up. We were thinking 'Why are we going to split up?' We were Number One in the single and album chart at the time. I've only just got over it!"

== Release format ==
The 7" was backed by the B-side "Shopping". A double 7" and 12" single version was available with additional studio cover versions of The Chi-Lites' "Stoned Out of My Mind", Curtis Mayfield's "Move on Up", and Edwin Starr's "War".

"Beat Surrender" was not included on any of the band's six studio albums. In the U.S., it appeared on the five-track EP, Beat Surrender (Polydor 810751), which peaked at No. 171 on the Billboard 200 album chart in April 1983.

== Cover art ==
The sleeve for the single, including the 12" and the double single pack, featured Gill Price, Weller's girlfriend at the time.

== Performances ==
"Beat Surrender" was previewed live on the first episode of The Tube, on 5 November 1982.

== Musicians ==
- Paul Weller – guitar, lead vocals
- Bruce Foxton – bass, backing vocals
- Rick Buckler – drums
- Tracie Young – backing vocals
- Peter Wilson – piano
- Martin Drover – trumpet
- Paul Cosh – trumpet
