= Down in the Tube Station at Midnight =

Single by the Jam

from the album All Mod Cons
- B-side: "So Sad About Us / The Night"
- Released: 13 October 1978
- Recorded: 7 August 1978
- Studio: RAK Studios, London
- Genre: Mod revival
- Length: 4:03
- Label: Polydor (UK)
- Songwriter: Paul Weller
- Producer: Vic Coppersmith-Heaven

The Jam singles chronology
"David Watts" / "'A' Bomb in Wardour Street" (1978)	"Down in the Tube Station at Midnight" (1978)	"Strange Town" (1979)

Back cover
- Keith Moon, who died shortly before the single's release

"Down in the Tube Station at Midnight" is a single by the Jam, the second single from their third album, All Mod Cons. Released in October 1978, it reached No. 15 on the UK Singles Chart. The single was backed by a cover version of the Who's song "So Sad About Us", and the song "The Night", written by Bruce Foxton.

== Production ==
Originally, Paul Weller had wanted to exclude the song from the All Mod Cons album, on the grounds that the arrangement had not sufficiently developed during the recording sessions. He was persuaded to include it by the record's producer Vic Coppersmith-Heaven. The song was recorded on 7 August 1978 at RAK Studios in London together with "Mr. Clean", "In The Crowd" and "The Place I Love", all of which also appeared on All Mod Cons.

== Lyrical theme and musical composition ==
The song tells the story of an unnamed narrator travelling on his own who enters a London Underground tube station at midnight to get the last train home, where he is attacked by a gang of men who 'smell like pubs, and Wormwood Scrubs, and too many right-wing meetings' as he buys a ticket from an automated machine. The song starts with the atmospheric sounds of a London Underground station, then a tense, syncopated beat carried by the bass guitar. The lyrics are sentimental, contrasting the warmth of home and domestic life with the dangers of 1970s London's urban decay and casual late-night violence. Tension is heightened by a heartbeat audio effect in the left stereo channel at points during the song.

The sound of an Underground train at the beginning and end of the song was recorded at St John's Wood Station.

== Cover art ==
The front cover photograph was taken at Bond Street tube station, on the westbound Central line. On the back cover was a portrait photograph of Keith Moon who had died a month prior to the single's release. The Who's "So Sad About Us" was included as a tribute to Moon.

== Certifications ==
Region	Certification	Certified units/sales
United Kingdom (BPI)	Silver	200,000^{‡}
^{‡} Sales+streaming figures based on certification alone.
