= The Eton Rifles =

Single by The Jam

from the album Setting Sons
- B-side: "See-Saw"
- Released: 26 October 1979
- Studio: Townhouse, London
- Genre: Punk rock; mod revival
- Length: 3:58
- Label: Polydor (UK)
- Songwriter: Paul Weller
- Producers: Vic Coppersmith-Heaven and the Jam

The Jam singles chronology
"When You're Young" (1979)	"The Eton Rifles" (1979)	"Going Underground" / "Dreams of Children" (1980)

Alternative cover

Music video
- "The Eton Rifles" on YouTube

"The Eton Rifles" is a song recorded by the Jam, written by Paul Weller. It was the only song to be released as a single from the album Setting Sons. Released on 26 October 1979, it became the band's first top-ten hit on the UK Singles Chart, peaking at No. 3.

The song was recorded at Townhouse Studios, and produced by Vic Coppersmith-Heaven and the Jam. The single's B-side is "See-Saw".

== Background ==
Eton College is an English public school located in Eton, Berkshire, and is regarded as one of the most prestigious educational institutions in the United Kingdom. Its cadet corps is the Eton College Combined Cadet Force, which was founded in 1860 as the Eton Volunteer Corps. Rick Buckler has noted that Eton is close to the band's hometown of Woking: "Growing up in Woking, you were aware that the school was nearby and these kids were being taught how to fire guns. It seemed crazy – a very militaristic view of education".

== Writing and recording ==
According to Weller, the song was inspired by a TV news report featuring Eton pupils jeering at a Right to Work march passing the school. He wrote it whilst on holiday with his girlfriend at Selsey Bill in the summer of 1979. Although he said that he didn't consider the original inspiration for the song "as particularly political", he acknowledged that his writing around the time of Setting Sons had been influenced by works such as George Orwell's Homage to Catalonia and Robert Tressell's The Ragged-Trousered Philanthropists, leading him to see the world from an increasingly socialist viewpoint. The line "Compose a revolutionary symphony/ Then went to bed with a charming young thing" was a dig at The Clash: although he was a fan of the band, Weller felt that they had already strayed from their origins and become a conventional rock group: "One minute they were singing 'Bored With The U.S.A' and the next they seemed to be spending most of their fucking time over there. I felt a bit cheated by them".

The song was recorded at Townhouse Studios. Three attempts were made to record the song, the first around the time the band were finishing work on All Mod Cons. The first two recordings were judged as unsatisfactory by the band and producer Vic Coppersmith-Heaven, who said that "it just didn't have the power, it just didn't have the excitement". Weller played Hammond organ on the track, influenced by The Specials' Jerry Dammers. Coppersmith-Heaven wanted a more metallic sound for Weller's guitar than was provided by the studio's acoustics, so he bought 30 sheets of corrugated iron to line the studio in order to obtain the required sound. The recording made use of multiple overdubs, a technique that Weller had previously been reluctant to use but began to embrace. The song's opening distorted chord was suggested by Coppersmith-Heaven. The chorus features vocals from a group of young Jam fans who had been hanging around outside the studio, invited to participate in the recording by Weller.

== Personnel ==
The Jam

- Paul Weller – lead vocals, guitars, Hammond organ
- Bruce Foxton – bass guitar, backing vocals
- Rick Buckler – drums

Additional performers

- Uncredited fans of the band – crowd vocals

== David Cameron ==
In May 2008, Conservative leader and Old Etonian David Cameron named "The Eton Rifles" as one of his favourite songs. Cameron is reported to have said, "I was one, in the corps. It meant a lot, some of those early Jam albums we used to listen to. I don't see why the left should be the only ones allowed to listen to protest songs." Paul Weller responded: "Which part of it didn't he get? It wasn't intended as a fucking jolly drinking song for the cadet corps."

In November 2011, The Guardian's music critic Alexis Petridis questioned Cameron further:

You said the Jam's song Eton Rifles was important to you when you were at Eton. Paul Weller, who wrote the song, was pretty incredulous to hear this, and claimed you couldn't have understood the lyrics. What did you think that song was about at the time? Be honest.

Cameron replied:

I went to Eton in 1979, which was the time when the Jam, the Clash, the Sex Pistols were producing some amazing music and everyone liked the song because of the title. But of course I understood what it was about. It was taking the mick out of people running around the cadet force. And he was poking a stick at us. But it was a great song with brilliant lyrics. I've always thought that if you can only like music if you agree with the political views of the person who wrote it, well, it'd be rather limiting.

In 1977, Weller had stated in the New Musical Express that people should vote for the Conservatives, a comment intended to shock and which later came back to haunt him during his long involvement with the Labour Party initiative Red Wedge. He added:

I think I have pretty much nailed where I was at to the mast. But people come to gigs for different reasons: it isn't necessarily about what the person on stage is singing. But at the same time, you do think, "Well, maybe this'll change their minds."

== Legacy ==
The song was ranked at number one among the top "Tracks of the Year" for 1979 by NME. In 2022, it was included in the list "The story of NME in 70 (mostly) seminal songs", at number 16.
