= That's Entertainment (The Jam song) =

1980 single by The Jam

Single by the Jam

from the album Sound Affects
- B-side: "Down in the Tube Station at Midnight" (live)
- Released: 7 February 1981
- Genre: Mod revival; acoustic rock; alternative rock
- Length: 3:38
- Label: Metronome; Polydor
- Songwriter: Paul Weller
- Producers: Vic Coppersmith-Heaven; The Jam

The Jam singles chronology
"Start!" (1980)	"That's Entertainment" (1981)	"Funeral Pyre" (1981)

Music video
- "That's Entertainment" on YouTube

"That's Entertainment" is a 1980 song by British punk-mod revivalist group the Jam from their fifth album, Sound Affects.

Although never released as a domestic single in the UK during the band's lifetime, "That's Entertainment" nonetheless charted as an import single (backed by a live version of "Down in the Tube Station at Midnight"), peaking at No. 21. The single was given its first full UK release in 1983 and peaked at No. 60. Its second reissue in 1991 also made the top 50.

The song remains one of the two all-time biggest selling import singles in the UK, alongside the Jam's "Just Who Is the 5 O'Clock Hero?", which hit the charts at No. 8 as an import in 1982.

"That's Entertainment" has been listed by BBC Radio 2 as the 43rd best song ever released by any artist.

== Song profile ==
"That's Entertainment" is the group's lone entry, at No.306, on Rolling Stone's 500 Greatest Songs of All Time list released in 2004. It consistently makes similar British lists of all-time great songs, such as BBC Radio 2's "Sold on Song" 2004 Top 100, at No.43.

The song uses an almost entirely acoustic arrangement with only very light percussion. Like much of Sound Affects, the song has strong undercurrents of pop-psychedelia. The only electric guitar part in the song is played backwards over one of the verses, a hallmark of psychedelia.

The minimalist, slice-of-life lyrics list various conditions of British working-class life. The first verse:

A police car and a screaming siren
Pneumatic drill and ripped-up concrete
A baby wailing, stray dog howling
The screech of brakes and lamp light blinking

culminating in the laconic and ironic refrain of "That's entertainment, That's entertainment"

"I was in London by the time I wrote 'That's Entertainment'," said Weller, "writing it was easy in a sense because all those images were at hand, around me." In an interview with Absolute Radio he said: "I wrote it in 10 mins flat, whilst under the influence, I'd had a few but some songs just write themselves. It was easy to write, I drew on everything around me."

== Certifications ==
Region	Certification	Certified units/sales
United Kingdom (BPI)	Gold	400,000^{‡}
^{‡} Sales+streaming figures based on certification alone.

== Morrissey version ==
"That's Entertainment"

Single by Morrissey
- A-side: "Sing Your Life"
- Released: 1 April 1991
- Length: 3:58
- Label: His Master's Voice
- Songwriter: Paul Weller

Morrissey singles chronology
"Our Frank" (1990)	"That's Entertainment" (1991)	"Pregnant for the Last Time" (1991)

Music video
- "That's Entertainment" on YouTube

English singer Morrissey covered "That's Entertainment" in 1991. It was released as a B-side for his single "Sing Your Life" and was later included in Suedehead: The Best of Morrissey. The song featured backing vocals from Chas Smash of Madness.
