= The Modern World (song) =

1977 single by The Jam

Single by the Jam

from the album This Is the Modern World
- B-side: "Sweet Soul Music" (live) "Back in My Arms Again" (live) "Bricks and Mortar"
- Released: 28 October 1977
- Genre: Rock; Punk rock; new wave
- Length: 2:30
- Label: Polydor
- Songwriter: Paul Weller
- Producers: Vic Coppersmith-Heaven and Chris Parry

The Jam singles chronology
"All Around the World" (1977)	"The Modern World" (1977)	"News of the World" (1978)

Rear cover
- Rear cover of This is the Modern World

"The Modern World" is a single released by the British group the Jam on 28 October 1977. It was later included on the band's second album, This Is the Modern World.

The single's A-side was backed by the tracks "Sweet Soul Music", and "Back in My Arms Again", recorded live at London's 100 Club on 11 September 1977. The song reached No. 36 in the UK Singles Chart, although the single version had slightly changed lyrics; replacing the words "I don't give two fucks about your review" with "I don't give a damn about your review".
