= The Bitterest Pill (I Ever Had to Swallow) =

1982 single by the Jam

Single by The Jam
- B-side: "Pity Poor Alfie"; "Fever"
- Released: 6 September 1982
- Genre: Blue-eyed soul
- Length: 3:34
- Label: Polydor (UK)
- Songwriter: Paul Weller
- Producer: Peter Wilson

The Jam singles chronology
"Just Who Is the 5 O'Clock Hero?" (1982)	"The Bitterest Pill (I Ever Had to Swallow)" (1982)	"Beat Surrender" (1982)

Rear cover
- Rear cover of The Bitterest Pill (I Ever Had to Swallow)

Music video
- "The Bitterest Pill" on YouTube

"The Bitterest Pill (I Ever Had to Swallow)" is a single that was released by The Jam in September 1982. It reached number 2 in the UK Singles Chart and remained there for two weeks, unable to dislodge "Eye of the Tiger" by Survivor and "Pass the Dutchie" by Musical Youth from the top spot.

The backing vocals are provided by Jennie Matthias, lead singer of The Belle Stars.

The man on the front cover of this single is Vaughn Toulouse, singer of Department S.

The song re-entered the UK Singles Chart in 1997 peaking at number 30.
