= In the City (The Jam song) =

1977 debut single by The Jam

- 1977 UK issue

Single by the Jam

from the album In the City
- B-side: "Takin' My Love"
- Released: 29 April 1977
- Recorded: March 1977 at Stratford Place, London
- Genre: Punk rock; power pop; mod revival
- Length: 2:16
- Label: Polydor
- Songwriter: Paul Weller
- Producers: Vic Smith; Chris Parry

The Jam singles chronology
"In the City" (1977)	"All Around the World" (1977)

Music video
- "In the City" on YouTube

"In the City" is the debut single by the English rock band the Jam from their debut studio album of the same title. It was released on 29 April 1977 and reached No. 40 on the UK Singles Chart in May 1977, making it their first Top 40 single and the beginning of their streak of 18 consecutive Top 40 singles.

While the album was not particularly successful in the UK Albums Chart, the song was the UK's first introduction to The Jam, and was characteristic of Paul Weller's youth anthems—mod-influenced celebrations of British youth—that dominated the band's early output.

In May 2002, Polydor Records commemorated the 25th anniversary of The Jam's recording debut by re-releasing the single in its original packaging, in its 7" vinyl record format and at its original price of 75 pence. The limited pressing sold out immediately, and the song made the Top 40 one more time, peaking at No. 36; higher than it did in its original release and two subsequent reissues. Only one single ("Freakin' Out" by Graham Coxon) has since charted in the UK Top 40 alone on limited edition 7" single sales.

Pitchfork Media ranked the track as being one of the "great debut singles".
