= Bruce Foxton =

English singer, songwriter and musician (born 1955)

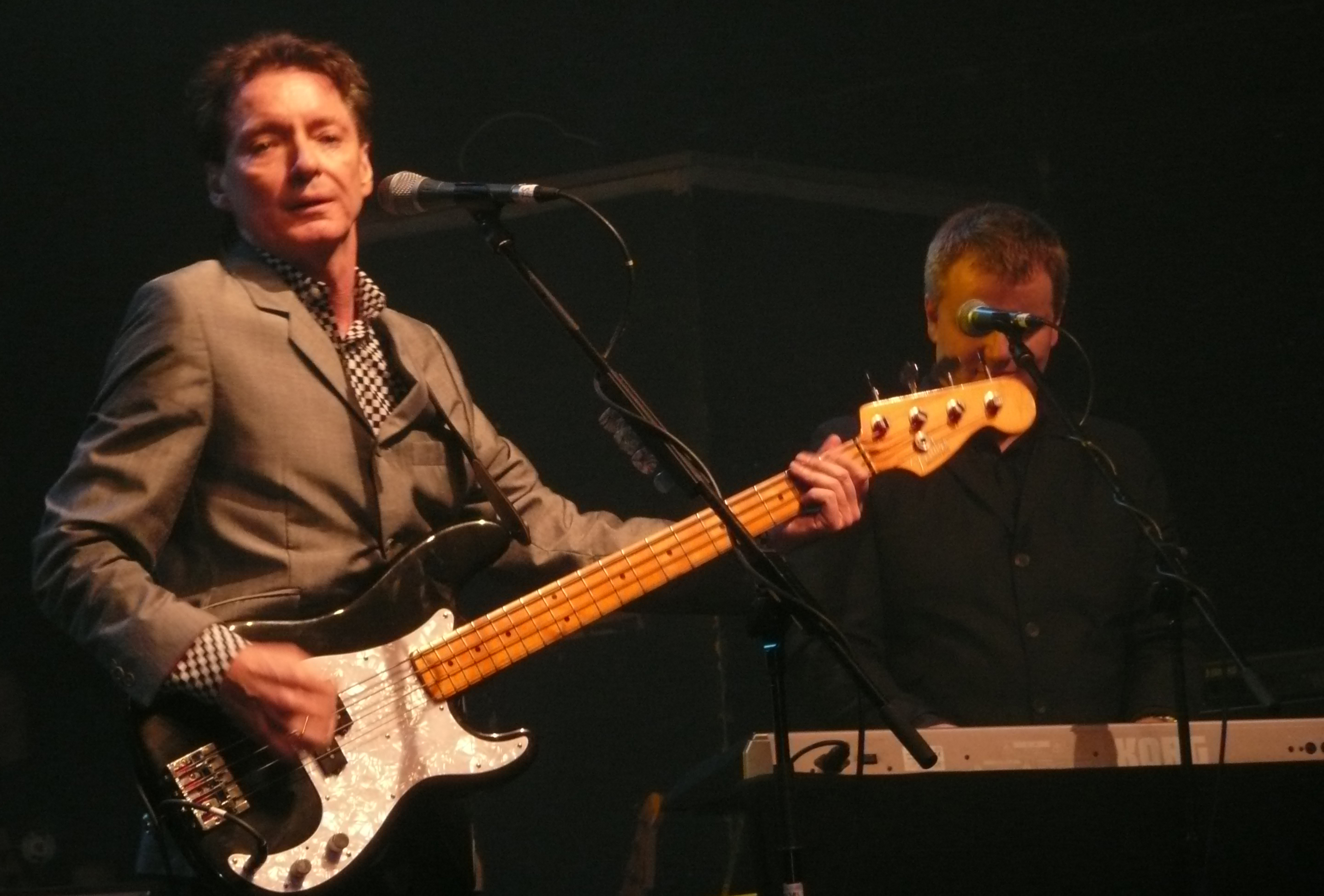
- Foxton performing live with From the Jam at the Glasgow Carling Academy, 2007

Background information
- Born: Bruce Douglas Foxton; 1 September 1955 (age 70); Woking, England
- Genres: Punk rock; new wave; mod revival; alternative rock; pop rock; hard rock
- Occupations: Singer; songwriter; composer; musician
- Instruments: Vocals; bass; guitar
- Years active: 1972–present
- Labels: Arista; Absolute; Bass Tone
- Website: brucefoxton.com

Bruce Douglas Foxton (born 1 September 1955) is an English singer, songwriter and musician.

Foxton's music career spans more than 50 years. He came to prominence in the late 1970s as bassist and backing vocalist of mod revival band The Jam. He occasionally performed the lead vocals, such as on the songs "Carnaby Street", "News of the World", "David Watts" and "Smithers-Jones". After the band's break-up, he pursued a brief solo career releasing one studio album, Touch Sensitive, in 1984. The album's single "Freak" became a UK Top 20 hit in 1983. He played in several bands, including Sharp with former Jam member Rick Buckler, before joining Stiff Little Fingers in 1990. After leaving SLF in 2007, Foxton joined Rick Buckler and members of his tribute band, the Gift, to tour under the name From the Jam. He has since returned to being a solo artist and continues to tour.

== Early life and education ==
Bruce Douglas Foxton was born the youngest of three boys on 1 September 1955, in Woking, Surrey, to parents Henry and Helen. He grew up at 126 Albert Drive, Sheerwater where he was born, and attended Sheerwater Secondary School, in Woking, where he showed great skill in football and technical drawing, but more importantly, where he met future bandmates Paul Weller and Rick Buckler. In 1972, he left school to work with his brother Derek at a printing firm. While there, he formed a band with his colleagues at work but he abandoned the project out of frustration due to lack of progress, and instead chose to join the Jam, formed by his old schoolmates, Weller and Buckler.

== The Jam ==
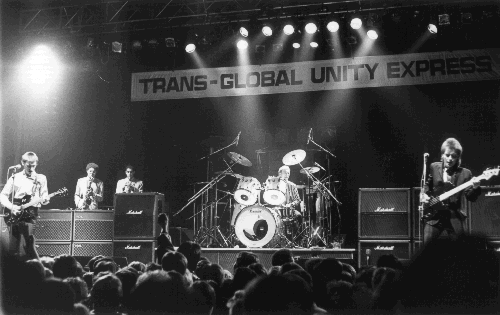
The Jam performing live in Newcastle upon Tyne during their Trans-global Unity tour, April 1982.

The Jam emerged at the same time as punk rock bands such as the Clash, the Damned, and the Sex Pistols.

The Jam's first single, "In the City", took them into the UK Top 40 in May 1977. In 1979, the group released "The Eton Rifles" and first broke into the Top 10, hitting the No. 3 spot in November. The increasing popularity of their blend of Weller's barbed lyrics with pop melodies eventually led to their first number one single, "Going Underground", in March 1980.

The Jam became the first band since the Beatles to perform both sides of the same single ("Town Called Malice" and "Precious") on one edition of Top of the Pops. They also had two singles, "That's Entertainment" (1981) and "Just Who Is the 5 O'Clock Hero?" (1982), reach No. 21 and No. 8 respectively in the UK singles chart despite not being released as singles in the UK—on the strength of import sales of the German single releases. At that time, "That's Entertainment" was the best-selling import-only single to date in the UK charts.

Drummer Rick Buckler and Bruce were the rhythm section of The Jam, which was fronted by singer, guitarist and songwriter Paul Weller. Foxton initially joined the band as lead guitarist (Weller played bass), but the pair switched roles following the departure of guitarist Steve Brookes. During his time with the band Foxton performed lead vocals on several tracks, most notably the singles "David Watts", a cover of a Kinks track, and "News of the World", which was his own composition.

Foxton also penned a number of other tracks, the most notable being "Smithers-Jones", done as a straightforward rock take for the B-side of "When You're Young" and later reworked with strings for the Setting Sons album. After Foxton joined Stiff Little Fingers in 1990 the band would regularly perform the song live. Whilst in the Jam, Foxton discovered the new wave band the Vapors and offered them two appearances on the May 1979 tour of The Jam. The band was managed by John Weller, Paul's father.

== Later career ==
After The Jam broke up in 1982, Foxton pursued a brief solo career and released his debut studio album Touch Sensitive in 1984. The album's single "Freak" became a UK Top 30 hit in 1983. He had other minor UK hits in 1983 and 1984 with the singles "This Is the Way" and "It Makes Me Wonder", and played in several bands, including Sharp with former Jam member Rick Buckler, before joining Stiff Little Fingers.

He stayed with Stiff Little Fingers for 15 years, during which time they recorded five albums, namely, Flags and Emblems, Get a Life, Tinderbox, Hope Street and Guitar and Drum. During his time with the band, he wrote and co-wrote several tracks, along with lead singer Jake Burns.

In 1994, Foxton and Buckler collaborated on Our Story, a biography of their years in the Jam.

In 2006, Foxton toured with Bruce Watson, Mark Brzezicki and Simon Townshend as the Casbah Club. When this band supported the Who in the UK, Foxton encountered Paul Weller backstage for the first time in nearly 25 years.

In February 2007, Foxton and Buckler announced they would be touring together again as From The Jam, with members of Buckler's Jam tribute band the Gift. In March 2008, they toured Australia and New Zealand – a first for Foxton and Buckler. A complete concert (recorded at the London Astoria in December 2007) was released on DVD in 2008 through the London-based indie label Invisible Hands Music.

On 5 May 2009, Foxton attended the funeral of Paul Weller's father John, who had been instrumental in the Jam's success. Foxton played bass and contributed backing vocals on the songs "Fast Car/Slow Traffic" and "She Speaks" included on Weller's solo album, Wake Up the Nation, released in April 2010. On 25 May 2010, at the Royal Albert Hall, Foxton joined Weller onstage for the first time in 28 years, to perform three songs, "Fast Car/Slow Traffic", "The Eton Rifles" and "The Butterfly Collector".

On 1 October 2012, Foxton released Back in the Room, his first album in 30 years. It was funded by fans through PledgeMusic and released on Absolute via Universal. Co-written with From The Jam singer Russell Hastings and featuring drummer Mark Brzezicki, guest musicians included Paul Weller. Weller performed on three tracks, the single "Number Six", "Window Shopping" and "Coming on Strong".

In November 2016, Smash the Clock, a second collaboration with Russell Hastings, was released on Absolute to generally favourable reviews. Once again it featured a number of well known guest musicians, including Paul Weller. "Get Ready to Rock" online magazine/blog in their review wrote "Foxton and Hastings may not thank me for saying it, but this is probably the best album Paul Weller never made" In December 2017, Foxton released the album From The Jam Live! with Hastings. In 2020, Foxton and Hastings celebrated the 40th anniversary of the Jam's fourth album, Setting Sons, with a From the Jam tour that involved the Vapors as the original support act on the Jam's 1979 Setting Sons tour. Because of the COVID pandemic, the tour was eventually postponed to 2021. In October 2022, The Butterfly Effect, Foxton's third collaboration with Hastings, was released on Absolute.

In January 2025, From The Jam announced that that due to health issues the final dates of the forthcoming Setting Sons tour would be Foxton's last performances with the group.

== Personal life ==
In early 2009, Foxton's wife of 25 years Pat, who had worked in public relations for United Artists and CBS, died of breast cancer.

Bruce is now married to Kate Foxton (née Farrow). In 2026, he revealed he had been diagnosed with Parkinson's disease.

== Discography ==
=== Solo ===
Studio albums

Year	Title	Label	UK Albums Chart
1984	Touch Sensitive	Arista	68
2012	Back in the Room	Absolute	–
2016	Smash the Clock	Absolute	31
2017	From the Jam Live!	Absolute	–
2022	The Butterfly Effect	Absolute	34

Singles

Year	Title	B-side	Album	UK Singles Chart
1983	"Freak"	"Writing's on the Wall"	Touch Sensitive	23
1983	"This Is the Way"	"Sign of the Times"	Touch Sensitive	56
1984	"It Makes Me Wonder"	"Trying to Forget You (Instrumental Mix)"	Touch Sensitive	74
1984	"S.O.S. My Imagination"	"25 or 6 to 4"	Touch Sensitive	–
1986	"Play This Game to Win"	"Welcome to the Hero"	Non-album single	–
2012	"Don't Waste My Time" [Promo-only] (With special guest Steve Cropper)	–	Back in the Room	–
2012	"Number Six" [Promo-only] (Featuring Paul Weller)	–	Back in the Room	–
