= The Jam =

English rock band (1972–1982)

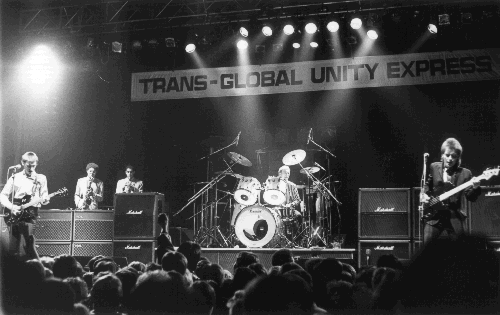
- The Jam performing live in Newcastle upon Tyne during their Trans-global Unity tour, April 1982

Background information
- Origin: Woking, Surrey, England
- Genres: Mod revival; new wave; punk rock; power pop
- Years active: 1972–1982
- Label: Polydor
- Spinoffs: The Style Council; Time UK; Sharp; The Gift; From the Jam
- Past members: Paul Weller; Bruce Foxton; Rick Buckler; (see Members section for others)
- Website: thejamofficial.com

The Jam were an English rock band formed in 1972 in Woking, Surrey, consisting of Paul Weller, Bruce Foxton and Rick Buckler. They released 18 consecutive top 40 singles in the United Kingdom, from their debut in 1977 to their break-up in December 1982, including four number one hits. As of 2007, "That's Entertainment" and "Just Who Is the 5 O'Clock Hero?" remain the best-selling import singles of all time in the UK. They released one live album and six studio albums, the last of which, The Gift, reached number one on the UK Albums Chart. When the group disbanded in 1982, their first 15 singles were re-released and 12 of them placed within the top 100.

The band drew upon a variety of stylistic influences over the course of their career, including 1970s punk and new wave and 1960s beat music, soul and rhythm and blues. The trio were known for their melodic pop songs, their distinctly English take on social commentary, and their mod image. The band launched the career of Paul Weller, who went on to form the Style Council and later started a solo career. Weller wrote and sang most of the Jam's original compositions and played lead guitar, using a Rickenbacker 330. Bruce Foxton provided backing vocals and prominent basslines, which were the foundation of many of the band's songs, including the hits "Down in the Tube Station at Midnight", "The Eton Rifles", "Going Underground" and "Town Called Malice".

== History ==
=== Formation (1972–1976) ===
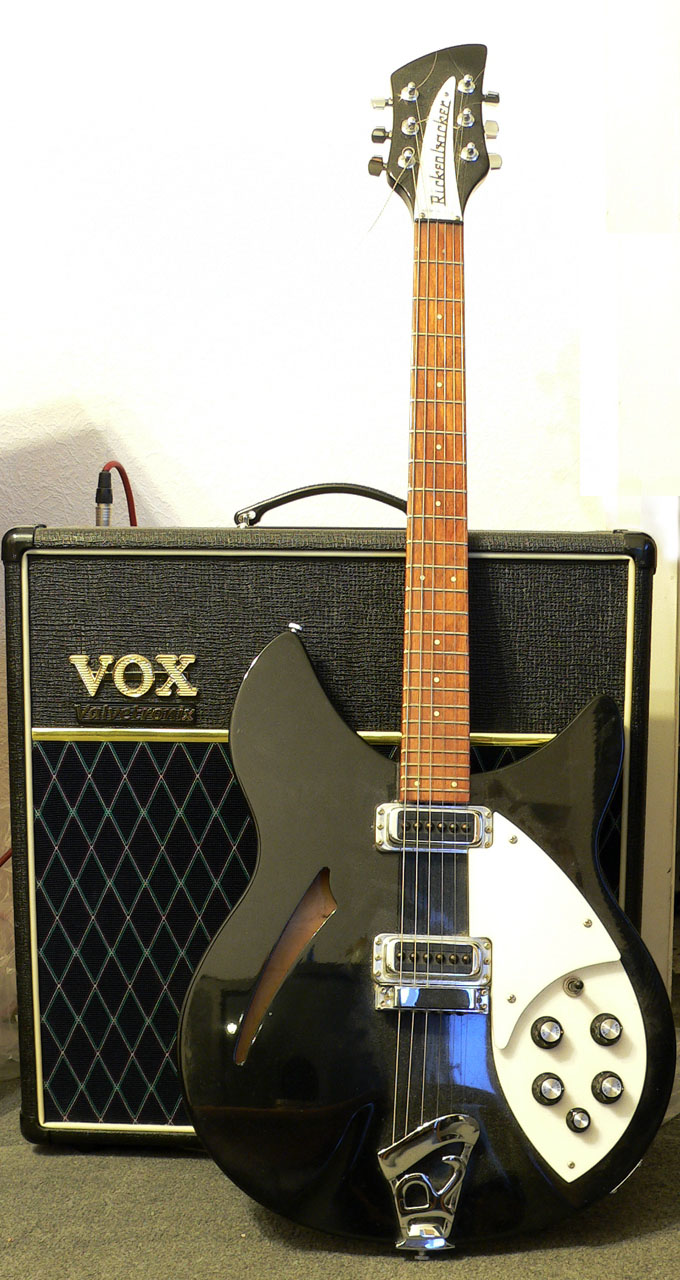
A Rickenbacker 330. Weller frequently recorded and performed live with the Jam using this instrument.

The Jam formed at Sheerwater Secondary School in Woking, Surrey, England, in 1972. The line-up consisted of Paul Weller on bass and lead vocals, with various friends. The name 'The Jam' was reportedly suggested by Weller's sister, Nicky. They played their first gigs at Michael's, a local club. The line-up began to solidify in the mid-1970s with Weller, guitarist/vocalist Steve Brookes and drummer Rick Buckler. In their early years, their sets consisted of covers of early American rock and roll songs by the likes of Chuck Berry and Little Richard. They continued in this vein until Weller discovered the Who's debut album My Generation and became fascinated with mod music. As he said later, "I saw that through becoming a Mod it would give me a base and an angle to write from, and this we eventually did. We went out and bought suits and started playing Motown, Stax and Atlantic covers. I bought a Rickenbacker guitar, a Lambretta GP 150 and tried to style my hair like Steve Marriott's circa '66." Eventually Brookes left the band, but although they advertised for a new guitarist (Gary Webb later known as Gary Numan claims to have failed an audition) he was not replaced. Up to this point Weller had been playing bass and Foxton had been the band's second guitar player; he persuaded Foxton to take over bass duties. The line-up of Weller, Foxton, and Buckler would persist until the end of the Jam's career.

Throughout their career, the Jam were managed by Weller's father, John Weller, who then managed Paul's subsequent career until his death in 2009. The Jam were signed to Polydor Records by Chris Parry in February 1977.

=== Early recordings (1977) ===
On 29 April 1977, Polydor released the Jam's debut single, "In the City", which charted in the Top 40 in the UK. On 20 May, the band released their debut album of the same title. The album, like those of the Clash and Sex Pistols, featured fast, loud and pointed songs. What set it apart from the records of those two bands was its more prevalent 1960s rock influences. The Jam covered Larry Williams's "Slow Down" (also covered by the Beatles) and the theme song of the 1960s TV series Batman, while original songs like "Takin' My Love" and "I've Changed My Address" showed a strong soul/R&B influence.

On 1 May 1977, the Jam joined the Clash's White Riot Tour as an opening act, alongside the Buzzcocks, the Slits, Subway Sect, and the Prefects at Guildford Civic Hall and concluded the tour on 30 May 1977 at the California Ballroom in Dunstable.

The Jam had political lyrics, condemning police brutality ("In the City") and expansionist development ("Bricks and Mortar"). One of their most openly political songs, "Time for Truth", bemoaned the decline of the British Empire and expressed disparaging sentiments about "Uncle Jimmy" (the Prime Minister, James Callaghan) in no uncertain terms ("Whatever happened to the great Empire?" / "I think it's time for truth, and the truth is you lost, Uncle Jimmy"). These pro-Empire sentiments and ostentatious displays of the Union Flag began to earn the group the tag of "Conservative". In 1977 Weller told the NME that the Jam would vote Conservative at the next election, but they later visibly changed their attitude.

After the non-LP single "All Around the World" nearly reached the UK Top 10, the Jam, having achieved a notable and loyal following in such a short time, were pressed to produce more material quickly. Their second album, This Is the Modern World, was released later in 1977. Bruce Foxton, generally considered a lesser songwriter than Weller, contributed two songs to the LP ("Don't Tell Them You're Sane" and "London Traffic"), both of which attracted criticism. His composing output gradually decreased, leaving Weller firmly established as the band's chief songwriter.

=== All Mod Cons (1978) ===
In March 1978, the Jam released "News of the World", a non-album single that was written and sung by Foxton. It charted at No. 27 in the UK, and was the band's second biggest hit to date. This was the only Foxton solo composition to be released as a Jam A-side. When the band went back into the studio to record a third album of primarily Foxton contributions, their songs were dismissed by producers as poor, and they held off recording an album in hopes that Weller would once again find inspiration. "News of the World" was used in the opening theme of the BBC television show Mock the Week during its extended run.

The Jam released their next single, the double A-side "David Watts"/"'A' Bomb in Wardour Street". "David Watts" was a cover of a Kinks song, throughout which Weller and Foxton traded lead vocals. "'A' Bomb in Wardour Street" was a Weller original. It became their most successful 7" since "All Around the World".

It was not until their next single, "Down in the Tube Station at Midnight", that the Jam really regained their former critical acclaim. Around this time, the Jam slimmed their team of two producers to one, Vic Coppersmith-Heaven, who helped develop the group's sound. In November, the Jam released their third LP, All Mod Cons. The twelve tracks included three of the tracks previously released as singles ("David Watts", "'A' Bomb In Wardour Street", and "Down in the Tube Station at Midnight") and two songs previously rejected for single release, the manic "Billy Hunt" and the acoustic ballad "English Rose".

=== Setting Sons and Sound Affects (1979–1981) ===
Following two successful and critically acclaimed non-LP singles, "Strange Town" and "When You're Young", the band released "The Eton Rifles" in advance of their new album, Setting Sons, released in November 1979. The LP also saw their first chart entry in the US, albeit at 137 on the Billboard 200. The album began life as a concept album about three childhood friends, though in the end many of the songs did not relate to this theme.

The band's first single of 1980 was intended to be "Dreams of Children". Due to a labelling error, however, the A- and B-sides of the single were reversed, resulting in the more conventional "Going Underground", the single's planned flipside, getting much more airplay and attention. The single was eventually officially recognised (and listed) as a double A-side by the time the release reached No. 1 in the UK.

Sound Affects, released in November 1980, was a No. 2 hit in the UK and peaked at No. 72 on the US Billboard charts, the band's most successful album in the US. Weller said that he was influenced by the Beatles' Revolver and Michael Jackson's Off the Wall. It included the acoustic "That's Entertainment". According to Weller he wrote "That's Entertainment", a bitter slice-of-life commentary on the drudgery of modern working-class life, in around 15 minutes upon returning inebriated from the pub. Although only available as an import single, it peaked at No. 21 on the UK charts. Despite the group's lack of commercial success in America, it made American magazine Rolling Stone's list of the 500 greatest songs of all time.

"Start!", released before the album, became another No. 1 single. Commenting on its similar bassline to The Beatles' Revolver cut "Taxman", Foxton said "Basslines like "Start!" just come to you. It’s not an intentional thing...it’s not quite like "Taxman", note-wise – you couldn’t sue me for it."

=== The Gift and break-up (1981–1982) ===
Two non-LP singles, "Funeral Pyre" and "Absolute Beginners" (named after Colin Macinnes' novel of the same title) were released in 1981, both reaching No. 4 on the UK charts. Ahead of The Jam's next full album, these songs were also released on a 1981 EP along with three additional songs ("Tales from the Riverbank", "Disguises" and "Liza Radley").

The 1982 release The Gift – the band's final studio LP – was a commercial success, peaking at No. 1 on the UK charts while spending an unprecedented 16 weeks on the US Billboard album charts with a peak position of 82. It featured several soul, funk, and Motown-stylised songs;, most notably the No. 1 single "Town Called Malice". While the song was described by the Irish Independent as "a class-war tirade set to a post-punk Northern Soul groove", it was in reality a tale about dealing with hardship in a small, downtrodden English town. "Town Called Malice" is one of a handful of The Jam songs Weller still performs (along with "That's Entertainment", "Man in the Corner Shop", "Strange Town", "Art School", "Start!" and "In the Crowd").

When "Town Called Malice" reached number one in the UK the group had the honour of performing both it and its double A-side, "Precious" on Top of the Pops. After the string-laden soul ballad "The Bitterest Pill (I Ever Had to Swallow)" peaked at No. 2, the band followed with their finale and another No. 1, "Beat Surrender". The latter featured Tracie Young on vocals; a few months later, she also guested on the Style Council's debut single "Speak Like a Child".

On 30 October 1982, after a world tour, Weller announced his intention to disband the Jam. They also made their final appearances on Top of the Pops and The Tube to promote "Beat Surrender". The tour included five consecutive nights at the Wembley Arena. The last date on the original itinerary had been scheduled for 9 December 1982 at Guildford Civic Hall, close to the band's hometown of Woking. Due to ticket demand, an additional date was added at the Brighton Conference Centre on 11 December 1982 for their last performance.

The decision to split was solely Weller's. Explaining at the time that he disliked the idea of continuing for as long as possible simply because they were successful, he later told The Daily Mirror in advance of a 2015 Sky documentary on the band, "I wanted to end it to see what else I was capable of, and I'm still sure we stopped at the right time. I'm proud of what we did but I didn't want to dilute it, or for us to get embarrassing by trying to go on forever. We finished at our peak. I think we had achieved all we wanted or needed to, both commercially and artistically."

Weller's decision to move on, announced by his father, the band's manager, at an extraordinary band meeting in the summer of 1982, "came as a shock" to Buckler and Foxton, who wanted to keep the band together. Buckler told the Woking News and Mail in 2012: "It was like we were going to be driving over a cliff at the end of the year, and you keep thinking 'Well, maybe he'll change his mind'." Both Buckler and Foxton described the experience as bitter, but in later years both expressed understanding, if not complete acceptance.

Following the split, Foxton did not speak to Weller for over 20 years, and Buckler said in 2015 that he still had not spoken to Weller since, despite repeated attempts by Buckler and Foxton in 1983 and 1984 to meet up with and talk to Weller. As the farewell tour neared its end, Polydor released a live album titled Dig the New Breed, a collection of songs from various concert performances over the band's five-year career which, while commercially successful, met with mixed reviews. The month after the final concert in Brighton, Polydor re-released all sixteen of the band's singles, nine of which re-entered the UK charts on 22 January 1983.

== Post-split releases ==
Snap! was the first The Jam compilation album released after the band split, reaching No. 2 on the UK Albums Chart in 1983. This was followed by Greatest Hits, released in 1991, which also peaked at No. 2 on the UK Albums Chart.

A five-CD box set Direction Reaction Creation, featuring all of the Jam's studio material (plus a disc of rarities) peaked at No. 8 on the UK Albums Chart upon its release in 1997; an unprecedented achievement for a box set. In 2002, Virgin Radio counted down the top 100 British music artists of all-time as polled by listeners and the Jam were No. 5 on the list. Weller made two other appearances in the poll; as part of The Style Council at No. 93 and as a solo artist at No. 21.

== Post-split careers ==
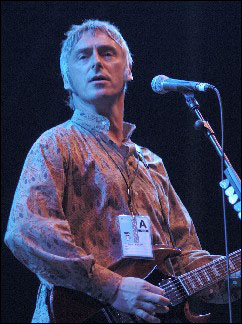
Paul Weller performing in the 2000s

In early 1983, Weller announced the formation of a new band, the Style Council, a duo with keyboard player Mick Talbot, formerly of the minor mod revival band the Merton Parkas. They would eventually split in 1989. He subsequently embarked on a successful career as a solo artist.

Following a short stint recording demos with Jake Burns and Dolphin Taylor, previously of Irish punk outfit Stiff Little Fingers, Foxton released his debut single "Freak" on Arista Records. Entering the UK Singles Chart at No. 34 on 30 July 1983, it eventually peaked at No. 23 and secured an appearance on Top of the Pops. Foxton's solo album Touch Sensitive followed in 1984, but subsequent singles "This Is the Way", "It Makes Me Wonder" and "My Imagination (S.O.S.)" failed to enter the Top 40. A final single "Play This Game to Win" was released on Harvest Records in November 1986.

Foxton went on to replace Ali McMordie in a reformed Stiff Little Fingers in 1990, remaining with the band until January 2006, when he quit to pursue other projects. Later that year he joined Simon Townshend (Pete Townshend's brother), and Mark Brzezicki and Bruce Watson (both of Big Country) in the band Casbah Club, which released an album called Venustraphobia.

After the Jam split, Buckler formed Time UK with Jimmy Edwards and Ray Simone, formerly of Masterswitch, ex-Tom Robinson Band guitarist Danny Kustow and (briefly) former Radio Stars/Sparks bassist Martin Gordon. The band released three singles "The Cabaret", "Playground of Privilege" and "You Won't Stop" before folding. In 1986, Buckler and Foxton released the single "Entertain Me" under the name Sharp.

In 2006, Buckler, who had not been playing for several years after Sharp quit, formed a band named the Gift, playing material from The Jam with musicians Russell Hastings and David Moore. Hastings, who spent many years as a local musician including a couple of years in a Jam tribute band, took on guitar and lead vocal duties. In 2006, Foxton performed on stage with The Gift at some of their concerts, and went on to join the band as bassist, with Moore moving to second guitar and keyboards. At this point the group changed its name to From the Jam. In a 2007 press release, Foxton and Buckler announced they were working on a new album and UK tour, which led to press speculation about a full or partial reunion of the Jam, to celebrate the 30th anniversary of In the City. Weller did not take part, and has publicly expressed his lack of interest in any type of reformation. In a 2006 interview with BBC Radio 6 Music, Weller stated a reunion of the Jam would "never, ever happen", and that reformations are "sad". He said: "Me and my children would have to be destitute and starving in the gutter before I'd even consider that, and I don't think that'll happen anyway ... The Jam's music still means something to people and a lot of that's because we stopped at the right time, it didn't go on and become embarrassing."

After the Jam split, Weller and Foxton reportedly did not speak to one another for 20 years. In June 2006, it was reported that Weller and Foxton met backstage at The Who's Hyde Park concert, and a ten-minute conversation ended with an embrace. Foxton claimed that the two became friends again in 2009 and this led to them collaborating for two tracks on Weller's solo album Wake Up the Nation in early 2010. In May 2010, Weller and Foxton appeared together on stage for the first time in 28 years at the Royal Albert Hall in London, performing three songs together. Foxton ruled out a Jam reunion.

== In popular culture ==
From 26 June to 27 September 2015, an exhibition entitled The Jam: About the Young Idea ran at Somerset House in London. For the first time, all three members of the band, the Weller family and music archivist Den Davis opened up their archives for the exhibition. Despite Foxton's reported hopes that the opening would bring all three together on stage for the first time since their 1982 split, Buckler did not attend. NME reported at the time that, while Foxton and Weller apparently reconciled no later than 2010, "Weller and Buckler are said to have not been in the same room since their band’s demise." The exhibition was curated by Tory Turk, Nicky Weller (Paul's sister) and Russell Reader.

In September 2015, The Jam: About the Young Idea, the documentary film, directed by Bob Smeaton, was broadcast on Sky Arts. The documentary was released on DVD, packaged with a recording of their 1980 live performance on German TV show Rockpalast.

About the Young Idea was an exhibition held at the Cunard Building in Liverpool, which was opened by Buckler and ran from 1 July to 6 October 2016. Curators Nicky Weller, Den Davies and Russell Reader drew together a wide range of memorabilia including personal items provided by the band members. A free app allowed visitors to engage with the exhibits by scanning VCodes.

The song "The Modern World" is used in a season four (2020) episode of the Netflix series 13 Reasons Why, as the backdrop to a student walkout.

This Is the Modern World was an exhibition held at Valley Gardens, Brighton, running from 1 August to 29 August 2022. Curated by Nicky Weller, it included a collection of previously unseen Jam and Style Council memorabilia.

An extract from the chorus of the song "News of the World" was used as the theme tune for the British satirical panel game Mock the Week.

== Members ==
Classic lineup

- Paul Weller – lead and backing vocals, lead guitar, bass, keyboards (1972–1982)
- Rick Buckler – drums, percussion (1972–1982; died 2025)
- Bruce Foxton – backing and lead vocals, bass, rhythm guitar (1974–1982)

Other members

- Steve Brookes – lead guitar, vocals (1972–1975)

Additional personnel

- Tracie Young – backing vocals on "Beat Surrender"
- Jennie Matthias (née McKeown) duetted on vocals on "The Bitterest Pill (I Ever Had to Swallow)"
- Afrodiziak – background vocals
- Peter Wilson – piano, drums, keyboards, Hammond organ
- Steve Nichol – trumpet, Hammond organ
- Luke Tunney – trumpet
- Martin Drover – trumpet
- Keith Thomas – saxophone, soprano sax
- Russell Henderson – steel drums

== Discography ==
Studio albums

- In the City (1977)
- This Is the Modern World (1977)
- All Mod Cons (1978)
- Setting Sons (1979)
- Sound Affects (1980)
- The Gift (1982)
