= Start! =

1980 single by the Jam

Single by The Jam

from the album Sound Affects
- B-side: "Liza Radley"
- Released: 11 August 1980
- Genre: Rock
- Length: 2:16
- Label: Polydor (UK)
- Songwriter: Paul Weller
- Producers: Vic Coppersmith-Heaven and The Jam

The Jam singles chronology
| "Going Underground” / "Dreams of Children" (1980) | "Start!" (1980) | "That's Entertainment" (1981) |

Alternative cover
- Start!, back of single cover

"Start!" is the eleventh UK single release by the Jam and their second number-one, following "Going Underground"/"Dreams of Children". Upon its release on 15 August 1980, it debuted at number three, and two weeks later reached number one for one week. Written by Paul Weller and produced by Vic Coppersmith-Heaven and the Jam, "Start!" was the lead single from the band's fifth album Sound Affects. The single's B-side is "Liza Radley".

"Start!" is based on both the main guitar riff and bass riff of the Beatles' 1966 song "Taxman" from the album Revolver, written by George Harrison. "To be Someone" and "Liza Radley" also utilise the "Taxman" bassline, as does "Dreams of Children", B-side to "Going Underground", played then as a lead guitar riff. Bassist Bruce Foxton commented on the similarity:

We were listening a lot to the Beatles' Revolver album. It wasn't intentional, but 'Taxman' subconsciously went in and when we came up with the idea for 'Start!' that's what went in. It isn’t exactly the same thankfully, otherwise I'm sure Paul McCartney would have thought about suing us!

The album version of the song runs at 2:30 and features trumpets in the final section.

== Release ==
"Start!" became a major chart hit for the Jam, reaching number one in the UK. Foxton noted that the commercial success of the single added pressure for the band, explaining, "That was the Number One that knocked David Bowie off the top of the charts. Then I thought, ‘Wow, we really have arrived!’ Once you get a Number One it’s a bit like Spinal Tap with their amps going up to 11. Once you get to Number One, where do you go? That created a lot more pressure."

== Other versions and sampling ==
Beastie Boys covered the song on their 1999 single, "Alive".

Manfred Mann's Earth Band covered the song on their 1987 album "Masque" under the title "What You Give Is What You Get (Start)".

== Bibliography ==
- Martin Roach (ed) (2008) The Virgin Book of British Hit Singles, Virgin Books, London.
