= Going Underground =

1980 single by the Jam

Single by the Jam
- A-side: "Dreams of Children"
- Released: 10 March 1980
- Recorded: 16 January 1980
- Studio: Townhouse Studios, London
- Genre: New wave; mod revival; power pop; hard rock
- Length: 2:50
- Label: Polydor
- Songwriter: Paul Weller
- Producer: Vic Coppersmith-Heaven

The Jam singles chronology
"The Eton Rifles" (1979)	"Going Underground" / "Dreams of Children" (1980)	"Start!" (1980)

Music video
- "Going Underground" on YouTube

"Going Underground" is a single by the English rock band the Jam, written by lead guitarist Paul Weller and released in March 1980. It debuted at number one in the UK Singles Chart, spending three weeks at the top. "Going Underground" was the first of four number one singles the band were to achieve throughout their career.

== Production ==
"Going Underground" and "Dreams of Children" were both recorded on 16 January 1980 at Townhouse Studios in London with Vic Coppersmith-Heaven producing. Weller specifically offers a sharp condemnation of Margaret Thatcher's recently elected Conservative government, the voter apathy that led her to power, and the military–industrial complex with the song.

== Release ==
"Going Underground" was not released on any of the band's six studio albums, although it has appeared on many compilations since the 1980s, as well as reissues of Setting Sons. The song was released as a double A-side with "Dreams of Children", which originally had been intended to be the sole A-side; following a mix-up at the pressing plant, the single became a double A-side, and DJs tended to choose the more melodic "Going Underground" to play on the radio.

"Going Underground" became the Jam's first UK number-one single and one of the top-selling releases of their career. At the time the single reached number one, the band were touring in the US, where they had long struggled commercially. Foxton recalled: "The record company called us up and told us we'd gone in at Number One. We said, 'Well, what are we doing here then?' We jumped on the plane and went home to where people did want to hear us. We flew back on Concorde and recorded Top of the Pops."

"Going Underground" was the 15th best-selling single in the UK in 1980. The song was ranked at number 2 among the "Tracks of the Year" for 1980 by NME.

== "Dreams of Children" ==
"Going Underground" was coupled with "Dreams of Children" as a double A-side. It opens and is intermittently accentuated with a backmasked sample of the band's 1979 song "Thick as Thieves". In the US the backwards intro was edited out making the single 10 seconds shorter than the UK Version. This US edit is available on the best-of compilation Snap!.

== Certifications ==
Region	Certification	Certified units/sales
United Kingdom (BPI)	Platinum	600,000^{‡}
^{‡} Sales+streaming figures based on certification alone.

== Cover versions ==
The song was covered by Buffalo Tom for the 1999 Jam tribute album Fire and Skill: The Songs of the Jam. This version also was released as part of a double A-side single with Liam Gallagher's and Steve Cradock's version of "Carnation" and reached number 6 in the UK Singles Chart.

Manfred Mann's Earth Band recorded their version of the song for the album Criminal Tango in 1986. In 2002, with Weller's permission, it was adapted into "Go England" by Daryl Denham to support the England national football team at the 2002 FIFA World Cup.
