= Vic Coppersmith-Heaven =

- Born: Victor Smith; August 1945 (age 81); England
- Occupations: Sound engineer, record producer
- Years active: 1961–present

Vic Coppersmith-Heaven (born Victor Smith, August 1945, England) is an English sound engineer and record producer, best known for his production work with the Jam.

== Career ==
Smith worked in the recording studios at Polydor after leaving school in 1961. By 1967, he worked as the engineer on Cat Stevens' album Matthew and Son and on the Rolling Stones' Let It Bleed. Smith then engineered other hits such as "Honky Tonk Women" and Joe Cocker's "With a Little Help from My Friends". In early 1968, he produced the Nashville Teens' recording of "All Along the Watchtower", the earliest cover version of Bob Dylan's song, which was released as a single in the UK and Europe on Decca Records some six months before Jimi Hendrix's hit version.

He produced for a number of artists, including Sunforest, who released an album on Nova, Deram Records's short-lived prog rock record label, in 1969. Sunforest was a psych-folk all-female British-American trio. Two of their recordings, "Overture to the Sun" and "Lighthouse Keeper", later emerged in re-recorded form on the soundtrack to Stanley Kubrick's film, A Clockwork Orange. Smith also produced for Tinkerbells Fairydust, as well as Peter Sarstedt's third United Artists album, Every Word You Say (Is Written Down), in 1971.

With Smith at the helm, Gravy Train recorded their fourth album, Staircase to the Day. Dawn Records released it in 1974.

In the mid-1970s, Smith worked at Polydor's old studios in Stratford Place, London, and was pleased to get involved with the Jam's recordings. "I remember that first gig Chris Parry took me to" said Smith. "It was a period of real excitement and although there were only between 15 and 20 people there, it was a great show with amazing spirit and energy". Later when the Jam slimmed their team of two producers down to one, the then-renamed Coppersmith-Heaven had developed the group's sound with harmonised guitars and acoustic textures. The Jam released their third LP, All Mod Cons in November 1978.

The Vapors track, "Turning Japanese", was produced by Coppersmith-Heaven and reached the top three on the UK Singles Chart, at the same time that the Jam's "Going Underground" was at number one. In September 1980, when "Start!" reached number one, it was Coppersmith-Heaven's second production credit on a chart-topping hit single. By the end of 1980, Coppersmith-Heaven's term with the Jam ended. "Funeral Pyre" was their first single to be produced by Pete Wilson instead of Coppersmith-Heaven, and was also unique in giving the writing credits to the band.

In 1987, he was responsible, with producer Nick Glennie-Smith and singer Kenny Young, for the album Transmissions under the group name Gentlemen Without Weapons. Young had been concerned about environmental issues for years and in 1989 he co-founded the rainforest conservation organization, Earth Love Fund, with the same colleagues. The same year, Coppersmith-Heaven worked with Black Sabbath for the second time, producing their album The Eternal Idol. A year later, he produced a single for the Kent-based indie band the Claim, entitled "Wait and See", at ex-Jam drummer Rick Buckler's studio.

Irritant's 2007 single "Voice of the Siren", described by the BBC as a "gargantuan rock classic", was produced by Coppersmith-Heaven. In 2008, Coppersmith-Heaven produced four tracks for The Q's debut EP Issues, which was released as a limited edition vinyl on Time for Action Records on 20 November.

== Credits ==
- Matthew and Son – Cat Stevens (1967)
- Skip Bifferty – Skip Bifferty (1968)
- Soul of a Man- Robbi Curtice (1968)
- Tinkerbells Fairydust – Tinkerbells Fairydust (1969)
- Heavy Blues – Champion Jack Dupree (1969)
- Sound of Sunforest – Sunforest (1969)
- Peter Wyngarde – Peter Wyngarde (1970)
- Every Word You Say (Is Written Down) – Peter Sarstedt (1971)
- Black Sabbath Vol. 4 – Black Sabbath (1972)
- Rock 'n Roll Gypsies – Vinegar Joe (1972)
- SNAFU – Snafu (1973)
- Rocka Rolla – Judas Priest (1974)
- In the City – The Jam (1977)
- This Is the Modern World – The Jam (1977)
- All Mod Cons – The Jam (1978)
- The Jolt – The Jolt (1978)
- Setting Sons – The Jam (1979)
- Hour Glass – Johnny Warman (1979)
- Sound Affects – The Jam (1980)
- New Clear Days - The Vapors (1980)
- Playing in the City – Barratt Band (1981)
- Vocabulary – The Europeans (1983)
- Step Off The Edge – The Venetians (1985)
- The Eternal Idol – Black Sabbath (1987)
- Transmissions – Gentlemen Without Weapons (1987)
- Island of Ghosts – Rossy (1991)
- The Rainforest Album - Earthrise (1992)
- The Gate – Joji Hirota (1998)
- Issues – The Q (2008)
