= Mod revival =

Revival of mod subculture and music from the late 1970s onwards

- The RAF roundel was co-opted by mods as a symbol for their subculture.
- Stylistic origins: Mod; rhythm and blues; punk rock; new wave; jazz; reggae; ska; 2 tone; soul; power pop; pub rock
- Cultural origins: 1976 Reading and London, Late 1970s, Scotland (mostly Glasgow) Late 1970s Australia (mostly Sydney & Melbourne) Early 1980s, United States
- Derivative forms: Oi!; street punk; Britpop

Regional scenes
- United Kingdom; Australia; United States

Other topics
- Timeline of punk rock; Quadrophenia

The mod revival is a subculture that started emulating the aesthetic of the sixties mod culture in the late 1970s. Beginning in the United Kingdom, it later spread to other countries. The movement started as a reaction to the disillusionment within the punk scene at the commercialism that had started to set in. First gaining momentum as an underground movement, it took off following the release of The Who film Quadrophenia.

The late 1970s mod revival was led by bands such as The Jam, which adopted a stark mod look and mixed the energy of punk with the sound of early 1960s. The mod revival was seen as a conscious effort to hark back to an earlier generation in terms of mod style and presentation such as wearing 1950s-style US Army field-parkas and riding Italian scooters.

== Beginnings ==
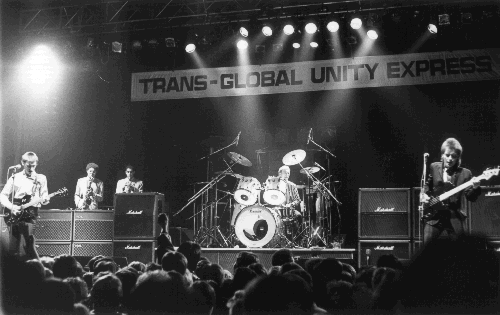
The Jam in Newcastle upon Tyne in 1982

The late 1970s mod revival combined musical and cultural elements of the 1970s pub rock, punk rock and new wave music genres with influences from 1960s mod jazz and power pop bands such as the Who, Small Faces and the Kinks.

The mod revival was largely set in motion by the Jam and their fans. The band had adopted a stark mod look and mixed the energy of punk with the sound of 1960s mod bands. Their debut album In the City (1977), mixed R&B standards with originals modelled on the Who's early singles. They confirmed their status as the leading mod revival band with their third album All Mod Cons (1978), on which Paul Weller's song-writing drew heavily on the British-focused narratives of the Kinks. The revival was also spurred on by small concerts at venues such as the Cambridge Hotel, Edmonton, Hop Poles Hotel and Howard Hall both in Enfield, the Wellington, Waterloo Road, London, and the Bridge House in Canning Town. In 1979, the film Quadrophenia, which romanticised the original 1960s mod subculture, widened the impact and popularity of the mod revival across the UK. The original mod revival fanzine, Maximum Speed started in 1979 and spawned other home-produced fanzines from then until the mid-to-late 1980s.

Bands grew up to feed the desire for mod music, often combining the music of 1960s mod groups with elements of punk music, including the Chords, Secret Affair, Purple Hearts and the Lambrettas. These acts managed to develop cult followings and some had pop hits, before the revival petered out in the early 1980s. More R'n'B based bands such as the Little Roosters, the Inmates and Nine Below Zero also became key acts in the growing mod revival scene in London.

In 1979 the mod scene in Australia began and took off particularly in Sydney & Melbourne, led by bands such as The Sets, Little Murders, Division 4, The Introverts & The Go. There was a documentary made in early 1981 called The Go-Set about the mod revival scene in Sydney & Melbourne. There was also a book published about the mod scene in Australia from 1979 to 1986.

== Growth ==
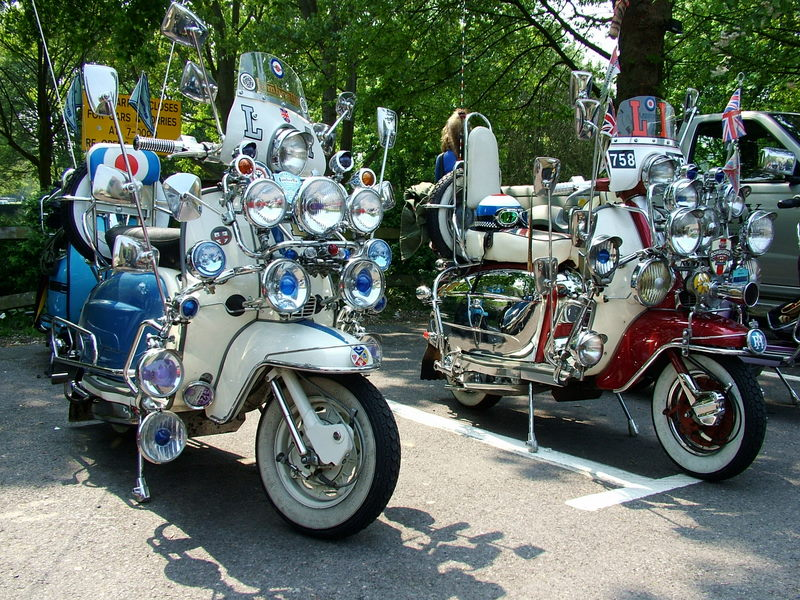
Two highly accessorised "mod-style" Lambretta scooters in 2007

Paul Weller broke up the Jam in 1982 and formed the Style Council, who abandoned most of the punk rock elements to adopt music much more based in modern jazz, R&B and early soul.

In the mid-1980s, there was a brief mod revival centered on bands such as the Prisoners. Fanzines following on from Maximum Speed – such as Mission Impossible, Patriotic, Roadrunner, Extraordinary Sensations and Chris Hunt and Karl Bedingfield's Shadows & Reflections – helped generate further interest in this stage of the mod revival. The Phoenix List was a weekly newsletter listing national events, and they organised a series of national rallies. A main player in the 1980s UK mod revival was Eddie Piller, who founded Countdown Records, and then went on to develop the acid jazz movement of the late 1980s. In 1985, the mod all-dayer in Walthamstow paid tribute to Band Aid, was sponsored by Unicorn Records, and had a host of 80s mod revival bands playing, old and new: Making Time (probably one of the biggest mod revival bands of the 80s after the Jam) and a well-known north London mod band called the Outlets, with band members Steve Byrne and Mario Vitrano, who also supported Steve Marriott's Packet of 3 and Geno Washington at various gigs in north London in the mid-80s.

The UK mod revival was followed by a mod revival in North America in the early 1980s, particularly in Southern California, led by bands such as the Untouchables, The Question, and Manual Scan. While on the East Coast (yet touring heavily in California) Mod Fun carried the revival torch. In Brazil the band Ira! led the mod revival releasing their first album Mudança de comportamento in 1985 on the WEA label. Their 1986 followup "Vivendo e Não Aprendendo" further established them as leaders of the mod revival in Brazil. They quickly achieved Gold Album status in sales of "Vivendo e Não Aprendendo".

== Later years ==
Bands associated with Britpop in the mid-1990s often championed aspects of mod culture. Blur were fans of Quadrophenia, with the film's star Phil Daniels featuring on the title track of the band's album Parklife and appearing in the song's video, while Oasis' Noel Gallagher struck up a high-profile friendship with Paul Weller. Around this time the UK music press championed a number of bands as constituting a new wave of the mod revival under the name "New Mod", including Menswe@r and the Bluetones, both of whom were later identified with Britpop.

A number of 1970s mod revival bands have reunited in recent years to play concerts, including Secret Affair, the Chords and the Purple Hearts.
