= Collected =

Collected may refer to:

- Collected (Black 'n Blue album), 2005
- Collected (Demis Roussos album), 2015
- Collected (Joe Jackson album), 2010
- Collected (k-os album), 2007
- Collected (Limp Bizkit album), 2008
- Collected (Massive Attack album), 2006
- Collected, an album by Mary Black, 1984
- Collected: 1996–2005, an album by the Wallflowers, 2009

== See also ==
- Collected Poems (disambiguation)
- Collected Stories (disambiguation)
- Collected works (disambiguation)
- Collecting
- Collection (disambiguation)
