= Oeuvre =

Oeuvre(s) or Œuvre(s) may refer to:

- A work of art; or, more commonly, the body of work of a creator

== Books ==
- L'Œuvre, a novel by Émile Zola
- Œuvres, a work by Emil Cioran
- Œuvres, a work by Auguste Brizeux
- Oeuvres, a work by Laurent Pariente

== See also ==
- Chef d'œuvre or masterpiece, a creation that has been given much critical praise
- Hors d'oeuvre, a small dish served before, i.e., "outside the work" of, the courses of a meal
- Œuvres Completes, a work by Georges Bataille
- Œuvres Completes, a work by Louis Racine
- Œuvres Completes, a work by Louis Antoine de Saint-Just
- Œuvres Completes, a work by Alexis de Tocqueville
- Musée de l’Œuvre Notre-Dame, a Strasbourg museum also called Oeuvre Notre-Dame
- Théâtre de l'Œuvre, a Parisian playhouse
- Œuvre de secours aux enfants, a World War II-era humanitarian organisation
- Catalogue raisonné, a complete enumeration of an artist's oeuvre
- The Complete Works (disambiguation)
- Collected works (disambiguation)
- Opus (disambiguation)
- Louvre (disambiguation)
