= A Collection =

A Collection may refer to:

- A Collection (Anne Briggs album), 1999
- A Collection (The Birthday Party album), 1987
- A Collection (The Doors album), 2011
- A Collection (Crickets album), 1965
- A Collection (Josh Groban album), 2008
- A Collection (Third Eye Blind album), 2006
- A Collection (Underworld album), 2011
- A Collection: Greatest Hits...and More, a 1989 album by Barbra Streisand
- A Collection 1984–1989, a 1995 album by Jane Siberry
- A Collection (video), a 2005 DVD by New Order

== See also ==
- Collection (disambiguation)
- The Collection (disambiguation)
