= Collected Stories =

Collected Stories may refer to:

- The Collected Stories of Katherine Anne Porter, published 1965
- The Collected Stories of Jean Stafford, published 1969
- Collected Ghost Stories, a collection of stories by Mary E. Wilkins-Freeman, published 1974
- The Collected Stories of Frank O'Connor, published 1981
- The Collected Stories of Eudora Welty, published 1982
- The Collected Stories of Philip K. Dick, published 1987
- Ernest Hemingway: The Collected Stories, published 1995
- Collected Stories (play), a 1996 play by Donald Margulies
- The Collected Stories of Arthur C. Clarke, published 2001
- The Collected Stories of Vernor Vinge, published 2001
- The Collected Stories of Amy Hempel, published 2006

== See also ==
- The Collected Books of Jack Spicer (1975)
- Collected works (disambiguation)
- Collected Poems (disambiguation)
