= The Collection =

The Collection may refer to:

== Film, television and theatre ==
- The Collection (film), the 2012 sequel to the 2009 film The Collector
- "The Collection" (30 Rock), a 2007 episode of 30 Rock
- "The Collection" (Justified), a 2010 episode of Justified
- "The Collection" (The Twilight Zone), an episode of The Twilight Zone (2002 revival)
- The Collection (TV series), a 2016 Franco-British web-television series
- The Collection (play), a 1961 play by Harold Pinter

== Museums ==
- "The Collection", a former name of Lincoln Museum, Lincolnshire

== Music ==
=== Albums ===
- The Collection (98 Degrees album), 2002
- The Collection (ABC album), 1996
- The Collection (Ace of Base album), 2002
- The Collection (Accept album), 1991
- The Collection (Alanis Morissette album), 2005
- The Collection (Alisha's Attic album), 2003
- The Collection (Amanda Lear album), 1991
- The Collection (Amy Grant album), 1986
- The Collection (Anthrax album), 2002
- The Collection (Atomic Kitten album), 2005
- The Collection (1993 Baccara album)
- The Collection (1998 Baccara album)
- The Collection (Bad Manners album), 1998
- The Collection (Barry White album), 1988
- The Collection (Belinda Carlisle album), 2014
- The Collection (Beverley Knight album), 2009
- The Collection (Black Sabbath album), 1992
- The Collection (1993 Blood, Sweat & Tears album), 1993
- The Collection (Blue album), 2007
- The Collection (Bone Thugs-N-Harmony album), two volumes, released 1998 and 2000
- The Collection (1991 Boney M. album)
- The Collection (Bonnie Tyler album), 2013
- The Collection (Camel album), 1985
- The Collection (Caroline's Spine album), 2006
- The Collection (Cast album), 2004
- The Collection (Clannad album), 1990
- The Collection (David Bowie album), 2005
- The Collection (Disturbed album), 2012
- The Collection (Divinyls album), 1994
- The Collection (Dolly Parton album), 1999
- The Collection (Donovan album), 1990
- The Collection (Earth, Wind & Fire album), 1986
- The Collection (Frank Sinatra album), 2011
- The Collection (Girlschool album), 1998
- The Collection (Gun album), 2003
- The Collection (Hawkwind album 1986)
- The Collection (Hawkwind album 2006)
- The Collection (Honeyz album), 2006
- The Collection (Hugh Masekela album), 2003
- The Collection (James album), 2004
- The Collection (Kenny G album), 1993
- The Collection (Martine McCutcheon album), 2012
- The Collection (Michael Jackson album), 2009
- The Collection ('N Sync album), 2010
- The Collection (New Model Army album), 2004
- The Collection (Ocean Colour Scene album), 2007
- The Collection (Quiet Riot album), 2000
- The Collection (Samantha Mumba album), 2006
- The Collection (Sandie Shaw album), 2007
- The Collection (Shed Seven album), 2004
- The Collection (Sonata Arctica compilation album), 2006
- The Collection (Spandau Ballet album), 1999
- The Collection (Steppenwolf album), 2003
- The Collection (Shakin' Stevens album), 2005
- The Collection (Strawbs album), 2002
- The Collection (Talk Talk album), 2000
- The Collection (Tears for Fears album), 2003
- The Collection (Tommy Fleming album), 2003
- The Collection (Toto box set), 2008
- The Collection (Ugly Kid Joe album), 2002
- The Collection (Ultravox album), 1984
- The Collection (Vangelis album), 2012
- The Collection (Wishbone Ash album), 2003
- The Collection (Whitney Houston album), a 5-CD box set released 2010
- The Collection (Yanni album), 2006
- The Collection 1977–1982, by the Stranglers, 1982
- The Collection 1978–1984, by Van Halen, 2023
- The Collection 1982–1988, by Céline Dion, 1997
- The Collection: Simon & Garfunkel, 2007
- The Collection II, by Van Halen, 2023
- The Collection 3.0, by Mina, 2015
- The Collection, by Boney M., 2008
- The Collection, by Bruce Springsteen, 2004
- The Collection, by Dan Reed Network, 2002
- The Collection, by Honeyz, 2006
- The Collection, by Nik Kershaw, 1991
- The Collection, by Synæsthesia, 2001
- The Collection II, by Spandau Ballet, 2003
- Angel: The Collection, 2000
- The Beatles: The Collection, 1982
- Extreme – The Collection, 2002
- Jamelia – The Collection, 2009
- Lifetime: The Collection, by The New Tony Williams Lifetime, 1992

=== DVDs ===
- The Collection (Earth, Wind & Fire video), 2005
- The Collection (TNT video), 2005

== Other ==
- The Collection (skyscraper), a skyscraper in Hawaii

== See also ==
- A Collection (disambiguation)
- Collection (disambiguation)
