= The Collector (disambiguation) =

The Collector is a 1963 novel by John Fowles.

The Collector(s) may also refer to:

== Film ==
- The Collector (1965 film), a film based on Fowles's novel, starring Terence Stamp and Samantha Eggar
- The Collector (1997 film), a Finnish film by Auli Mantila
- The Collector (2002 film), a Canadian film directed by Jean Beaudin
- The Collector (2004 film), a Danish film
- The Collector (2005 film), a Polish film directed by Feliks Falk
- The Collector (2009 film), a horror film directed by Marcus Dunstan
- The Collector (2012 film), a romantic film starring Rudolf Martin
- The Collectors (1999 film), a television film starring Casper Van Dien
- The Collector, a fictional character in Mad Max: Beyond Thunderdome

== Television ==
=== Characters ===
- The Collector, a fictional character from Bonkers
- The Collector, a character from The Owl House
- "The Collector", supervillain alter ego of The Simpsons character Comic Book Guy, featured in the "Desperately Xeeking Xena" segment of the episode "Treehouse of Horror X"

=== Episodes ===
- "The Collector", Atomic Betty season 2, episode 18a (2006)
- "The Collector", Blue Heelers season 2, episode 24 (1995)
- "The Collector", Captain Star episode 11 (1998)
- "The Collector", CatDog season 1, episode 10b (1998)
- "The Collector", CopyCat Killers season 2, episode 29 (2017)
- "The Collector", Dead Man's Gun season 2, episode 7 (1998)
- "The Collector", Ghost Whisperer season 2, episode 20 (2007)
- "The Collector", Hulk and the Agents of S.M.A.S.H. season 1, episode 4 (2013)
- "The Collector", Interpol Calling episode 21 (1960)
- "The Collector", Lavender Castle episode 16 (1999)
- "The Collector", Laverne & Shirley season 5, episode 19 (1980)
- "The Collector", Miraculous: Tales of Ladybug & Cat Noir season 2, episode 2 (2017)
- "The Collector", ¡Mucha Lucha! season 2, episode 16 (2004)
- "The Collector", My Daemon episode 5 (2023)
- "The Collector", Richie Rich (1980) season 3, episode 2a (1982)
- "The Collector", Scare Tactics season 3, episode 19 (2009)
- "The Collector", Seven Days season 2, episode 8 (1999)
- "The Collector", Starsky & Hutch season 3, episode 11 (1977)
- "The Collector", The Dead Zone season 4, episode 2 (2005)
- "The Collector", The Magnificent Seven season 1, episode 8 (1998)
- "The Collector", The Naked Archaeologist season 2, episode 16 (2008)
- "The Collector", The Roly Mo Show episode 76 (2005)
- "The Collector", Victor and Valentino season 1, episode 12 (2019)
- "The Collector", We've Got Each Other episode 3 (1977)
- "The Collector", Z-Cars series 6, episode 83–84 (1967)
- "The Collector", Z Nation season 2, episode 8 (2015)
- "The Collectors", Dixon of Dock Green series 14, episode 3 (1967)
- "The Collectors", Jimmy Two-Shoes season 2, episode 17b (2011)
- "The Collectors", Logan's Run episode 2 (1977)

=== Shows ===
- The Collector (Canadian TV series), a 2004–2006 supernatural drama
- The Collector (Serbian TV series), a 2005–2006 science fiction series
- The Collectors (TV series), a 1986 British drama series

== Literature ==
- The Collector (Silva novel), a novel by Daniel Silva
- The Collectors (novel), a novel by David Baldacci
- The Collector, a 2013 novel by Victoria Scott
- "The Collector", a short story by Kelley Armstrong
- The Collector, a fictional character in Simon R. Green's novel series Nightside

== Music ==
- The Collectors (Canadian band), a 1960s Canadian psychedelic rock band that became Chilliwack
  - The Collectors (album), 1968
- The Collectors (Japanese band), a Japanese mod rock band
- The Collectors #1, a 2002 album by Dickey Betts & Great Southern
- The Collector (album), by Andreas Johnson, 2007
- "The Collector", a song by Nine Inch Nails from With Teeth, 2005
- "The Collector", a song by Sarah Nixey from Sing, Memory, 2007

== Video games ==
- The 7th Guest 3: The Collector, an unreleased sequel to the computer game The 7th Guest
- Azetlor the Collector, a villain in Ghostbusters: The Video Game
- The Collector, the main villain in LittleBigPlanet
- The Collectors, a fictional insectoid race in Mass Effect 2

== People ==
- Robert Berdella (1949–1992), also known as The Collector, American serial killer
- The Collector (serial killer), unidentified Polish serial killer

== See also ==
- La Collectionneuse (lit. The Collector), a 1967 French film directed by Eric Rohmer
- The Collector Collector, a 1997 novel by Tibor Fischer
- Collector (disambiguation)
