= Collected works =

Collected works may refer to:

- Complete works, the complete works of a single author, often edited posthumously
- Anthology (Florilegium), a collection of works by a single author or by various authors on a given topic

== Literature ==
=== Books ===
- Collected Works (Bernice Summerfield anthology), a 2006 original anthology edited by Nick Wallace, featuring a spin-off character from Doctor Who
- Collected Works of Sri Aurobindo, published by the Sri Aurobindo Ashram in 1972
- Collected Works of Aleister Crowley 1905-1907, a trilogy of books published by the occultist Aleister Crowley
- Marx/Engels Collected Works (MECW), the largest collection of translations into English of the works of Karl Marx and Friedrich Engels
- The Collected Works of C. G. Jung, a multi-volume work containing the writings of psychiatrist Carl Jung
- The Collected Works of Carl Barks, a series of books containing all Disney comics and covers written and/or drawn by Carl Barks
- The Collected Works of Jeremy Bentham, a series intended to form the definitive edition of the writings of the philosopher and reformer Jeremy Bentham, currently in progress

== Music ==
- Collected Works (music), a category of published music in print, generally containing Classical music from a past repertory

=== Albums ===
- Collected Works (Hunters & Collectors album), the first compilation album by Australian rock group, Hunters & Collectors
- Collected Works (Mike Peters album), 2001
- The Collected Works of Tourniquet, an album by the American Christian metal band Tourniquet
- Collected Works (Simon and Garfunkel album), a three-disc compilation of the 58 songs in the five Simon and Garfunkel albums
- Painkiller: The Collected Works, a four disc box set that contains previously released albums by Painkiller
- Collected Works 95–96, a collection of recordings by Masaki Batoh
- The Collected Works of the Roches, a 2003 album by The Roches
- Collected Works of Johann Christian Bach, a 48 volume edition of the music of J.C. Bach

== See also ==
- The Collected Books of Jack Spicer (1975), first appeared in 1975, ten years after the death of Jack Spicer
- Collected Ghost Stories, a collection of stories by author Mary E. Wilkins-Freeman
- The Standard Edition of the Complete Psychological Works of Sigmund Freud, a 1956 complete edition of the works of Sigmund Freud
- Standard works, a collection of doctrines used by The Church of Jesus Christ of Latter-day Saints
- Selected Works: 1972–1999, a compilation box set by the American band Eagles, released in 2000
- Collected (disambiguation)
- Collected Stories (disambiguation)
- Collected Poems (disambiguation)
- The Complete Works (disambiguation)
- Oeuvre (disambiguation)
