= Young Lucretia and Other Stories =

1892 collection of short stories by Mary Eleanor Wilkins Freeman

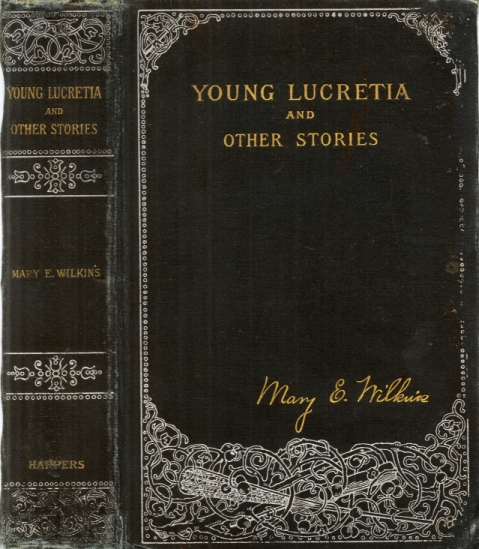
- Young Lucretia and Other Stories cover 1892
- Author: Mary Eleanor Wilkins Freeman
- Language: English
- Published: 1892 (Harper & Brothers)
- Publication place: United States
- Media type: Print (hardcover)
- Pages: 253 pp (first edition)

Young Lucretia and Other Stories is a collection of thirteen short stories by Mary Eleanor Wilkins Freeman. The stories were originally published individually in literary magazines such as Harper's Young People and St. Nicholas Magazine between 1887 and 1892. They were later collected and reprinted by Harper & Brothers in 1892. These stories primarily feature children who learn moral lessons after misbehaving.

== Stories ==
=== "Young Lucretia" ===
Young Lucretia Raymond lives with her strict Aunts Lucretia and Maria. During Christmastime, Lucretia is invited by the other schoolchildren to trim (decorate) the Christmas tree at the schoolhouse. When she anticipates her aunts' disapproval and refusal to let her participate in the trimming, the other girls insult her aunts, calling them “mean” and “stingy.” They also taunt Lucretia, saying she would not get anything on the Christmas tree. Lucretia comes to feel she does not fit in with the other children and that her family was dishonored. Lucretia asks her aunts for presents, but they refuse her request, so Lucretia wraps parcels for herself and leaves them at the schoolhouse while her aunts are out. During the distribution of presents at the Christmas celebration, Lucretia's name is called many times, to her aunts’ amazement and Lucretia's remorse. When she opens the packages, the aunts see that the parcel's contents were objects from their house. One package, however, contains a rag doll made by Mrs. Emmons, one of their neighbors. When Lucretia sees this doll, she cries and expresses surprise that someone had given her a gift. On the way home, she confesses to her aunts that she wanted the other children to think that she received presents. The aunts confiscate her rag doll, and send her to bed before deciding they were being too harsh. The next day, on Christmas Day, the aunts buy Lucretia a big wax doll, bedstead, baby carriage and bureau.

=== "How Fidelia Went to the Store" ===
The story begins with Mrs. Lennox deliberating with her sister, Maria Crooker, on what to do about the fact that Mr. Lennox had forgotten to bring back the raisins necessary to bake the wedding cake of the Lennox's older daughter, Cynthy Lennox. Since Mr. Lennox and Cynthy were both out of town, and Mrs. Lennox and Aunt Maria where physically incapable of going to the store, the women decided to send Mrs. Lennox's six-year-old daughter, Fidelia, to Ms. Rose's store for raisins. After giving Fidelia instructions to knock on the side door of Ms. Rose's store, Mrs. Lennox gave Fidelia a penny for a peppermint as a treat, and sent her off with a cart to carry the raisins. When Fidelia failed to return home by the expected time, the women became nervous. Aunt Maria decided she would set out to look for Fidelia. Soon after, Mr. Lennox and Cynthy returned in the buggy. When they found out that Fidelia was lost, they set out in the buggy to search for her, picking up Aunt Maria midway. When the party reached Ms. Rose's store, they found Fidelia next to the store door. Fidelia cried and complained that she had knocked and knocked, but that no one had answered her. When Mrs. Rose realized this, she exclaimed that she had been in the kitchen and had not heard the knocks. At the end of the story, Fidelia was given cookies and milk from Mrs. Rose's. As the party was about to leave, Fidelia cried for her peppermint candy. Subsequently, she received an assortment of candies.

=== "Ann Mary; Her Two Thanksgivings" ===
“Ann Mary; Her Two Thanksgivings” is a short story by American writer Mary E. Wilkins Freeman. It was first published in 1892. The story revolves around Ann Mary, a delicate and slender little girl who lives with her grandmother. Despite their differences, Ann Mary shares an odd resemblance to her grandmother, not only in features but also in mannerisms. The narrative captures the dynamics between the two as they prepare for Thanksgiving, with Ann Mary keeping a watchful eye on her grandmother’s cooking endeavours.

=== "Ann Lizy's Patchwork" ===
Ann Lizy Jennings is orphaned and lives with her grandmother. One day she, put on her best dress and set out to visit her friend, Jane Baxter. Before Ann left, her grandmother gave her embroidered green silk bag to Ann to carry patchwork in. She also instructed Ann to be careful with the bag and her dress, and to finish four squares of patchwork at Jane's before playing. Ann realized that sewing four squares of patchwork and taking tea with Jane would leave her with less than enough time to play with Jane. About halfway to Jane's house, Ann used her handkerchief, and when she put it back into the bead bag containing her patchwork, she purposefully left the bag open and swung it by one string. When Ann arrived at Jane's house, the bag felt empty, but she ignored the emptiness and played with Jane. In the meantime, the parson's wife's sister, her husband, and her daughter Sally were traveling in the area. They picked up Ann Lizy's patchwork, which Sally decided to put it in her quilt.

Eventually, Ann settled down to sew her patchwork and panicked because it was gone. Mrs. Baxter sent Ann and Jane to look for the patchwork, but along the way, Ann Lizy climbed a wall and ended up tearing her best dress. She also lost her grandmother's embroidered green bag. That night, after Ann returned home, her grandmother scolded her. Ann eased her conscience by confessing she had lost her patchwork on purpose. That week the parson's wife visited Mrs. Jennings, and Ann Lizy noticed that she was carrying grandmother's green embroidered bag. Later on, grandmother took her friend, Mrs. White, and Ann to visit the parsonage. Sally and her family happened to be visiting too. Sally was asked to show Ann Lizy her patchwork. To Ann's surprise, Sally's patchwork pieces were the ones Ann had lost. Mrs. White commented on the fact that the patchwork pattern matched one of grandmother's dresses. At the discovery, the parson's wife insisted that Mrs. Jennings take back the handkerchief and embroidered bag. Sally's mother also insisted that Ann take back the patchwork despite the fact that Sally had sewed it. In response, Ann confessed that she had lost the patchwork on purpose because she did not want to sew. On their way home, grandmother realizes Ann had learned her lesson.

=== "The Little Persian Princess" ===
The story was originally published in St. Nicholas Magazine.

Dorothy came from the almshouse to work for Dame Betsey, spinning flax to make linen for the Dame's six daughters. Since Dorothy's only family member is an old grandmother at the almshouse, she lives off the table scraps of Dame Betsey and her daughters, but still willingly shares her food with the poor little boy next door. One day, a cat arrives and the Dame's daughters ask to keep the cat to spite their mother, who hates cats. That night, after all the daughters had gone to bed, Dorothy was sewing an apron for the Dame's eldest daughter when the cat transformed into a princess in Dorothy's sight. The Princess confessed her status as a Persian Princess traveling under the disguise of a cat in order to rescue her brother, who has been transformed into a Maltese cat. She then asked what Dorothy desired the most. Dorothy answered that she wished to provide a cushioned chair and a window for her grandmother. The princess asked Dorothy to follow her little ways away from the house, where they find the Princess’ portmanteau disguised as a small wallet. From the portmanteau, the princess pulled out a robe for Dorothy to exchange for her freedom from the Dame. The next day Dorothy obtained her freedom and set out with the princess. They settled in a cottage and Dorothy made cushions from the Princess’ inexhaustible dresses in the portmanteau. Eventually, Dorothy was able to support her grandmother, and the princess set off on her travels again. Awhile later, Dorothy went into the city to deliver cushions. At the house she was making the delivery to, she encounters the princess and her brother in the form of two cats. Dorothy learns that they are in the care of two older women, and the princess shares that her brother is under a spell that can only be broken if one of the women chases him out with a broom. However, the Princess states that this seems unlikely to happen because the ladies are quite kind to them. Before Dorothy and the princess parted, the princess wished her a happy life. Dorothy eventually marries the boy next door.

=== "Where the Christmas-Tree Grew" ===
This story originally appeared in St. Nicholas Magazine.

Jenny Brown is a naïve girl who lives alone with her mother and is attending her first term of school. One day, during recess at school, some girls and Earl Munroe, the handsome son of the wealthiest man in town, trick Jenny Brown into believing the idea that Christmas presents are grown on Christmas trees. They told her that if she climbed the Franklin Mountain past her house, she could find the Christmas trees and Christmas presents. Jenny believed the other children headed towards the mountain after school. That night, Mrs. Brown ran to the Munroe's and reported that Jenny was lost. When Earl heard this, he sobbed and confessed that he had tricked Jenny into believing presents grew on trees. Mr. Munroe raised an alarm and organized a search party to look for Jenny. In the meantime, Earl decided to give away his Christmas tree and presents to Jenny, transporting them by sled. On the way to Jenny's house, he meets Maud, the Judge's daughter. Earl suggests that Maud give her things to Jenny too, and Maud overcomes her reluctance, contributing food and clothes. As Earl proceeded to the Brown's house with the gifts, more children joined the procession, bringing their gifts to Jenny. The next day, some searchers met an old woodcutter, who said that he had found Jenny crying on the mountain and had taken her home, but that the storm had prohibited him from letting the searchers know. When Jenny returned home, she was met with love and with presents.

=== "Where Sarah Jane's Doll Went" ===
Sarah Jane receives a new rag doll from her sister Serena, who warns Sarah not to take the rag doll to school. Sarah loves the doll so much that she is reluctant to separate from it during the school day, so she defies her sister's warning and takes the doll to school. At recess, Sarah displays her doll to many other admiring children. One of the older boys, Joe West, comes over, asking to hold the doll. Sarah is initially reluctant to let him hold the doll but she ultimately relents. When Joe gets the doll, he makes fun of Sarah and refuses to return the doll. Afterschool, Joe ignores Sarah's pleas for the doll. He takes it with him and runs home. On the way home, Sarah passes the Wests’ fields and sees Joe teasing a calf. She calls out to Joe but he ignores her, heading towards the house. Sarah then sits by the roadside and cries as a remorseful Joe watches her through the window from his house. In actuality Joe had not been teasing the calf, Sarah had been watching Joe attempting to wrestle the doll from the mouth of the hungry calf who had caught hold of the doll in Joe's pocket.

Three months later, there was a knock on Sarah Jane's door. A packet containing a china doll was left for her. Unknown to Sarah, Joe had worked for three months to buy the doll. This time Sarah obeyed her mother's instruction not to take the doll to school. Years later, Joe and Sarah laugh about the story.

=== "Seventoes' Ghost" ===
At the beginning of the story, Benjamin Wellman, who lives with his mother and his grandfather, brings back a puppy and asks to keep it as a pet. His domineering grandfather refuses to let the puppy stay because his own seven-toed cat, Seventoes is afraid of dogs. After Grandfathers’ refusal, Benjamin takes the puppy to Sammy, who had previously mentioned that he would like to keep the dog if Benjamin's grandfather would not let him. Benjamin then started back for home, angry that he was not allowed to keep the dog. When he arrived home, he saw Seventoes sitting on the ledge of the well. In his anger, he shoved Seventoes into the well. Benjamin watched Seventoes disappear under the water and was shocked when he realizes what he had done. Remorseful, he runs into the house and confesses to his grandfather and his mother that he had killed Seventoes. Grandfather sent mother to fish the cat out of the well, but before she could do it, Seventoes walked into the house, unhurt, because his extra toes had enabled him to climb up the well. Benjamin sobbed with relief and expresses his remorse. That night, he fed Seventoes and vowed that he would behave well in the future.

=== "Little Mirandy, and How She Earned Her Shoes" ===
Mirandy is the second youngest in a family of thirteen children. Due to the number of children, clothing often ran out in the family. One Sunday, Mirandy cried because she had to attend the meetings without shoes. In response, her mother said that she could pick berries during berry season and earn her shoes herself. Towards the end of July, Mirandy set out to pick berries with her siblings. On the way to the pasture, Mirandy overheard her siblings conversing about the fact that Captain Moseby's land had the thickest berries, but that they were unobtainable since the Captain was not afraid to shoot or set his dog on anyone who tried to steal his berries. When they arrived at the pasture, Mirandy decides to venture to the Captain's lot. Bringing her younger brother, baby Jonathan, along because Mirandy was left in charge of him. Mirandy managed to fill her bucket in Captain Moseby's lot, and started back towards the rest of her siblings, but when she tried to get through the vines separating Captain Moseby's lot and the rest of the pasture, a vine scratched Jonathan's leg, and he started kicking and screaming. In order to take her brother back, Mirandy left her bucket. When she returned to Captain Moseby's lot, her bucket was gone, so she went back to her siblings and told them she had been picking berries at the Captain's lot and that she had lost her bucket there. The siblings decided that the Captain had taken the bucket, so they knocked on his door in attempt to retrieve the bucket. No one answered, and eventually, all of the siblings decided to leave except Mirandy, who was determined to stay until she got her bucket. At two, the Captain opened his door and told her that in order to retrieve her bucket, she had to settle with him in his house. She entered his house and he commanded her to eat the whole bowl of berries, which she suspiciously did. The captain then proceeded to ask why she stole his berries. She responded that she wanted to earn her shoes. He admonished her, mentioning soldiers having to go barefoot at Valley Forge. Eventually, he warns her not to steal his berries again, and then brings her a pair of shoes.

=== "A Parsnip Stew" ===
The story begins with Mrs. Whitman cooking dinner with her daughter Ruth. Mrs. Whitman is worried that the parsnip stew she is cooking would not be enough to feed her husband, children and brothers Caleb and Silas. When the stew was almost done, the Wigginses, Mrs. Whitmans’ distant relatives, arrive at the door with their three children and old Mrs. Wiggins. Their arrival without warning angered Ruth, who knew that there was not enough stew. Ruth complained to her mother that she thought the Wigginses actions were rude. In response, mother entrusted Ruth to add salt to the stew. After adding the salt, Ruth left for school without taking any dinner. While at school, she reflected and was able to empathize with the Wigginses. After reflecting, she decided to show the Wigginses her hospitality when she went home. However, when Ruth arrived home, her sister met her at the door and recounted that Ruth had mistakenly added saleratus into the stew. Serena said that when the Wigginses tasted the stew, they accused the Whitmans of spoiling the stew on purpose: an assumption that resulted from the Whitmans’ half-hearted welcome and the fact that none of the Whitmans had taken any stew. In order to salvage the situation, Ruth visited the Wigginses with a jar of their honey, apologizing and explaining the situation. She then invited them to have parsnip stew with them the next day. When Ruth returned home, Serena was distressed because most of their parsnips had rotted. She mentioned that the Wigginses had a good lot of parsnips, so Ruth decided to send over the neighbor's son to buy some parsnips from the Wigginses. The next day Mr. Wiggins arrived and apologized, saying he had lent out their horse earlier because he did not know about the dinner invitation. As a result, the Wigginses had no transportation and could not have dinner with the Whitmans.

=== "The Dickey Boy" ===
Mrs. Mandy Rose lives with her son, Willy, and her wealthy friend, Miss Elvira Grayson. One day, Hiram Fairbanks, her brother, arrives with a boy he introduces as the orphaned son of the Dickeys, a lower-class family associated with questionable morals. Hiram tells Mrs. Rose that Mrs. Dickey had recently died and that he had brought the Dickey boy to help her out around the house since Willy is too weak to work. Mrs. Rose and Miss Grayson are initially reluctant to take in the Dickey boy, because they question his virtue, but eventually the Dickey boy proves to be both hardworking and trustworthy; in particular when he returns exact change after being sent to the store. Eventually, he earns the favor of the family and is given many gifts: including an apple tree from Mr. Hiram. One day, Mrs. Rose realizes she could not find one of her silver teaspoons so she accuses the Dickey boy of thievery. The boy denied that he had stolen the silver spoon and runs away leaving his possessions behind. Mrs. Rose decides to look for her spoon among the boy's things. She opens a suspicious nailed box but instead of finding her silver spoon, she finds Mr. Dickey's clay pipe and Mrs. Dickey's calico. At the same time, Willy clears the Dickey boy's name, showing up with the spoon and admitting that he had taken the spoon out to dig his garden and had forgotten to put it back. The adults become worried because the Dickey boy had run away and would be caught up in the incoming storm. Mr. Fairbanks organized a search party and eventually found the Dickey boy in Dickey's tree. Mr. Fairbanks carried the boy home where he received love and trust from Mrs. Rose, Elvira and Willy.

=== "A Sweet-Grass Basket" ===
Nancy lives with her parents and her wealthy cousin, Flora, who owns pretty things because her father is well off. One day, the two cousins go off to Indian ground and visit an Indian princess’ tent. Inside the tent were baskets and canoes for sell. One particular 50-cent sweet-grass basket catches the attention of the girls, and Flora expresses that she plans on buying the basket next week, after she receives her allowance from her father on Saturday. This stirs up jealousy in Nancy, who is determined to make the 50 cents and buy the basket before Flora. A few days later, Nancy is sent over to Aunt Lucretia's on and errand. Nancy offers to pick berries for her aunt for a fee. Aunt Lucretia agrees to Nancy's suggestion, offering her seven cents for each quart of blackberries. All week, Nancy worked hard picking blackberries, eventually earning the amount she needed to buy the basket. However, Aunt Lucretia did not have the change to pay her, and asked her to wait a few more days. The next day, Nancy again asked her aunt for money, but her Aunt still had not gotten change. On Saturday, Flora received her money but did not think of buying the basket. This spurred Nancy to go to Aunt Lucretia's once again, to ask for her money. This time she went without permission. Although Lucretia was able to get her money, both her aunt and mother scolded her for her disobedience. The next day after church, Nancy told Flora she wanted to pick flowers, entreating Flora to head home first. Instead of picking flowers, Nancy ran to the Indian camp to buy the sweet-grass basket. When she returned home, her mother scolded her and made her take the basket back to the Indian princess. The princess refused to give back her money. Nancy obeyed her mother, leaving the money and the basket with the princess, but she remained sad, sobbing through supper. The next day, the Indian princess appeared at their door and returned the basket, which Nancy gave to Flora. Later on, Nancy was sent on another errand and the princess returned with more baskets. Flora bought an identical sweet-grass basket for Nancy and surprised Nancy with it.

=== "Mehitable Lamb" ===
Hannah Maria Green, a slim teenage girl, is sitting on the doorstep sewing a seam in a sheet when her younger friend, Mehitable Lamb, arrives to visit. Hannah entreats Mehitable to take a walk with her, refuting Mehitable's declaration that her mother may not approve. As they walk, Hannah and Mehitable pass apple orchards and they discuss their affinity for early apples. Then, Hannah remembers that her Uncle Timothy and Aunt Jenny had an orchard with early apples a little ways away from where they were. However, Mehitable Lamb declares that her mother would not like it and refuses to move. This angers Hannah, who taunts Mehitable, saying she is afraid. Hannah decides to venture on, making Mehitable promise not to tattle-tell. That night, Mrs. Green, Hannah's mother, went to the Lambs because she could not find Hannah Maria. However, Mehitable would not tell where Hannah was. In the desperation to find Hannah, Mehitable's Aunt Suzy suggested that Mrs. Lamb whip Mehitable into telling. However, Mehitable continued to refuse to tell where Hannah was even after being whipped. The next day, the Lambs delivered breakfast to the Greens. While they were there, Jenny, Hannah's Aunt, drove into the yard with Hannah Maria in her wagon. Hannah met her mother's anger with grief, expressing remorse and saying she thought Mehitable would’ve told the adults where she was. Eventually, Mrs. Lamb, Aunt Suzy, and Hannah all mended their relationships with Mehitable, and Hannah brought Mehitable some early apples.

== Publication history ==
The short stories compiled in this collection were originally printed in prominent literary magazines. "Young Lucretia", "How Fidelia Went to the Store", "Where Sarah Jane's Doll Went", "Seventoe’s Ghost", "Little Mirandy, and How She Earned Her Shoes", "A Parsnip Stew", and "A Sweet-Grass Basket" were all originally publications that appeared in Harper's Young People between the years 1887 and 1892. "Ann Mary; Her Two Thanksgivings", "Ann Lizy's Patchwork", "The Little Persian Princess", "Where the Christmas-Tree Grew", "The Dickey Boy", and "Mehitable Lamb" were originally published in the St. Nicholas Magazine around the same time period. In 1892, these short stories were collected and published by Harper & Brothers Publishers, and in 1970, the book was reprinted.

== Analysis ==
=== Setting ===
Freeman often sets her stories in small, local, close-knit towns where neighbors share common values and often interact. She portrays realistic villages in which town members know one another and have close relationships. This is seen in "How Fidelia Went to the Store" when Fidelia's mother sends her to a store to buy raisins. When Fidelia does not return home in time, her mother suspects that Ms. Rose, the storekeeper, had kept Fidelia for dinner.

At times Freeman highlights the localism of her towns through dialect, as seen in the way her characters often drop the ends of their words. An example of this is seen in “Young Lucretia” when Mrs. Emmons says, “I heerd the other day they was goin' to have a Christmas-tree down to the school-house. Now I'd be willin' to ventur' consider'ble that child don't have a thing on't.”

=== Marriage and the role of women ===
A common theme in Freeman's stories is the struggle in women between being a submissive woman, who adheres to traditional feminine roles, and being the domineering woman, who gains a more dominant role because she is unable to, or refuses to submit to men.

The parson's wife in “Ann Lizy's Patchwork” who is described as “sweet, gentle” and “gracious” is an example of the submissive woman. Another example of the submissive woman fulfilling feminine roles is found in “The Little Persian Princess.” In the story, the princess sacrifices her royal position and becomes a cat to follow her brother—the male figure in her life. From the princess's devotion to her brother, Dorothy learns the importance of finding a male partner. She ultimately marries her neighbor. The submissive woman is defined by her marital status, often relying upon marriage to help her fulfill her household duties. This explains the preoccupation with marriage in many of Mary Wilkins Freeman's stories. For example, in “How Fidelia Went to the Store”, the women are extremely focused on preparing for Cynthy's wedding. In the same way, in stories such as “The Dickey Boy” and “Where Sarah Jane's Doll Went”, characters are identified according to their marital status.

The second type of woman is one who becomes dominant in the household either due to the absence of men or willfully in revolt of male dominance. The woman domineering in the absence of man generally still submits to feminine ideals. They also rear younger women to submit to men and fulfill traditional female roles. The domineering mother figure is seen in “Mehitable Lamb” in the fact that when Mehitable meets Hannah, Hannah is sewing. Freeman writes that Hannah desires to play with dolls but that “the Doll is packed away... mother said I have other things to tend to. Dolls are well enough for girls like you. Here, you’d better take her; I’ve got to finish my sewin’.” This scene demonstrates that Hannah Maria learns the roles of a woman from her domineering mother’s instructions. The character of Grandmother Jennings is another example of the domineering mother figure. Grandmother Jennings holds authority in the household because she has no man to submit to.

Similarly, the female characters that rebel against male dominance ultimately submit to gender roles when they are reminded of their social conditions. For example, Hannah Maria revolts against the rules imposed on the submissive female when she attempts to go to her uncle’s orchard because “Father walks over sometimes.” She believes she is equal to her father, a man, and thinks that women are able to do what men do. However, following the path to the orchard leads Hannah into trouble. Ultimately, Hannah is remorseful and again exhibits selflessness, a trait belonging to the submissive woman, when she gives her apples to Mehitable.

=== Moral stories: children and distant mothers ===
Freeman was well known for her children's fiction. These stories were moralistic and aimed at teaching children traits such as obedience. At times they featured mystical creatures as seen in “The Little Persian Princess”, and more often than not, they feature naïve children and distant mothers. Through the distance of the mothers, children are allowed the license to decide their course of action, which generally leads to misbehavior. Stories such as “Mehitable Lamb” features the distant mother and the disobedience. Hannah Maria has the opportunity to wander off to her uncle's orchard because her mother had gone to the next town. Sometimes, in place of a mother is a maternal figure such as an aunt or grandmother seen in the example of characters such as Grandmother Jennings in “Ann Lizy's Patchwork.” These distant mothers exist as role models for the children, representing the cultures and societal norms. Their distant presence ultimately allows the children to recognize their wrong actions and feel remorse.

=== Uncivilized vs. civilized ===
Unlike her contemporaries, Freeman's stories do not feature overly wicked villains or external influences of industrialized metropolis. The only foreign influence in these stories is that of Indians. Through the Indians interactions in “The Sweat-Grass Basket” with two white children, Nancy and Flora, Freeman demonstrates cultural distinction and white supremacy. Initially, Nancy and Flora are described as intrigued but scared to approach the Indians. This demonstrates the cultural division and the fear that “civilized” children have for what they consider to be "uncivilized" and mystical. Similarly, Freeman herself highlights this racial hierarchical difference through her environmental descriptions; she sets whites in towns and houses and Indians in swamps and tents. Other cases in which Freeman portrays Native Americans as inferior can be seen when she attributes cruelty and dull-wittedness to the race, stating, “That stout Indian Princess displayed …a witty shrewdness which seemed abnormal…Perhaps something of the ancient cruelty of her race possessed her.”

Along with the portrayal of Indian culture as subordinate to white culture is the suggestion that white children should abide by their superior cultural codes. This is also seen in "The Sweat-Grass Basket." Due to the fact that Nancy buys the basket on Sunday, she breaks the Sabbath, an established cultural rule. Ultimately, she has to set this wrong right, and she is ordered to return the basket to camp.

== Critical reception ==
Mary Wilkins Freeman was highly popular, producing up to 200 short stories in her time. Between 1883 and 1889, she managed to print 52 of her short stories, many of which appeared in popular Harper's publications. Among these are: “Young Lucretia”, “How Fidelia Went to the Store”, “Where Sarah Jane's Doll Went”, “Seventoe’s Ghost”, and “A Parsnip Stew”, which reappeared in Young Lucretia and Other Stories. The publication of Young Lucretia and Other Stories follows that of A New England Nun, and Other Stories, which contain two of Freeman's most popular works: "A New England Nun" and "The Revolt of Mother". However, Freeman did not disappoint, and the Athenaeum gave Young Lucretia and Other Stories a positive review, commenting on the "artful simplicity of the style" and the "dramatic boldness of the narrative".

Some scholars have criticized some of Freeman's depictions of minorities, such as showing "a gnomish Black man as weak, easily fooled, and child-like".
