= Onorato and Krebs =

Swiss photographer duo

Taiyo Onorato and Nico Krebs are a Swiss photographer duo. Onorato (born 1979) and Krebs (born 1979) met when they were both students at the Zurich University of the Arts. They have worked collaboratively since 2003.

Their work is included in the collections of Centre national des arts plastiques, Paris, the Museum of Modern Art, Luxembourg, and the Museum of Contemporary Photography, Chicago.
