= Collection =

Collection or Collections may refer to:

== Computing ==
- Collection (abstract data type), the abstract concept of collections in computer science
- Collection (linking), the act of linkage editing in computing
- Garbage collection (computing), automatic memory management method

== Mathematics ==
- Set (mathematics)
- Class (set theory)
- Family of sets
- Indexed family
- Multiset
- Parametric family

== Albums ==
=== Collection ===
- Collection (Soccer Mommy album), 2017
- Collection (2NE1 album), 2012
- Collection (Agnes album), 2013
- Collection (Arvingarna album), 2002
- Collection (Jason Becker album), 2008
- Collection (Tracy Chapman album), 2001
- Collection (The Charlatans album)
- Collection (Dave Grusin album), 1989
- Collection (The Jam album)
- Collection (Wynonna Judd album)
- Collection (Magnus Uggla album), 1985
- Collection (Men Without Hats album), 1996
- Collection (MFÖ album), 2003
- Collection (Mike Oldfield album), 2002
- Collection (Praxis album), 1998
- Collection (The Rankin Family album), 1996
- Collection (Lee Ritenour album), 1991
- Collection (Joe Sample album), 1991
- Collection (Spyro Gyra album), 1991
- Collection (The Stranglers album), 1998
- Collection (Suicidal Tendencies album), 1993
- Collection (Thee Michelle Gun Elephant album), 2001
- Collection (The Warratahs album), 2003
- Collection: The Shrapnel Years (Greg Howe album), 2006
- Collection: The Shrapnel Years (Tony MacAlpine album), 2006
- Collection: The Shrapnel Years (Vinnie Moore album), 2006
- Collection I, a 1986 compilation album of songs by the Misfits
- Collection II, a 1995 companion album to the Misfits' Collection I

=== Collections ===
- Collections (Alexia album)
- Collections (Rick Astley album), 2006
- Collections (Cypress Hill album)
- Collections (Terence Trent D'Arby album), 2006
- Collections (Delphic album), 2013
- Collections (Amanda Marshall album), 2006
- Collections (Charlie Major album), 2006
- Collections (Red Norvo, Art Pepper, Joe Morello and Gerry Wiggins album), 1957
- Collections (Yanni album), 2008
- Collections (The Young Rascals album), 1966

== Fashion ==
- Cruise collection
- Texas Fashion Collection

== Other uses ==
- Cash collection, the function of an accounts receivable department
- Collection (church), money donated by the congregation during a church service
- Collection agency, agency to collect cash
- Collections management (museum)
  - Collection (museum), objects in a particular field forms the core basis for the museum
  - Fonds in archives
  - Private collection, sometimes just called "collection"
- Collection (Oxford colleges), a beginning-of-term exam or Principal's Collections
- Collection (horse), a horse carrying more weight on his hindquarters than his forehand
- Collection (racehorse), an Irish-bred, Hong Kong–based Thoroughbred racehorse
- Collection (publishing), a gathering of books under the same title at the same publisher
- Scientific collection, any systematic collection of objects for scientific study
- Collection (film), a 2021 film starring Alex Pettyfer
- Collection #1, a database of sets of email addresses and passwords
- Collections care, to prevent or delay the deterioration of cultural heritage
- Collection class, in object-oriented programming
- Generated collection, a musical scale formed by repeatedly adding a constant interval around the chromatic circle
- Poetry collection

== See also ==
- A Collection (disambiguation)
- Aggregate (disambiguation)
- Collected (disambiguation)
- Collecting
- Collector (disambiguation)
