= Selected Poems =

Among the numerous literary works titled Selected Poems are the following:

- Selected Poems (Conrad Aiken) by Conrad Aiken
- Selected Poems (Robert Frost) by Robert Frost
- Selected Poems (J. S. Harry collection) by J. S. Harry
- Selected Poems (Harwood collection) by Gwen Harwood
- Selected Poems (Galway Kinnell) by Galway Kinnell
- Selected Poems (MacDiarmid) by Hugh MacDiarmid
- Selected Poems (Howard Moss) by Howard Moss
- Selected Poems (Robert Nathan) by Robert Nathan
- Selected Poems (Sylvia Plath) by Sylvia Plath
- Selected Poems (Pinsky collection) by Robert Pinsky
- Selected Poems (J. C. Ransom) by John Crowe Ransom
- Selected Poems (Riddell collection) by Elizabeth Riddell
- Selected Poems (Smith collection) by Clark Ashton Smith
- Selected Poems (James Tate) by James Tate
- Selected Poems (Vern Rutsala) by Vern Rutsala
- Selected Poems by Huang Te-shih by Huang Te-shih.

== See also ==
- Collected Poems (disambiguation)
