= Mary Eleanor Wilkins Freeman =

American novelist (1852–1930)

Mary E. Wilkins Freeman
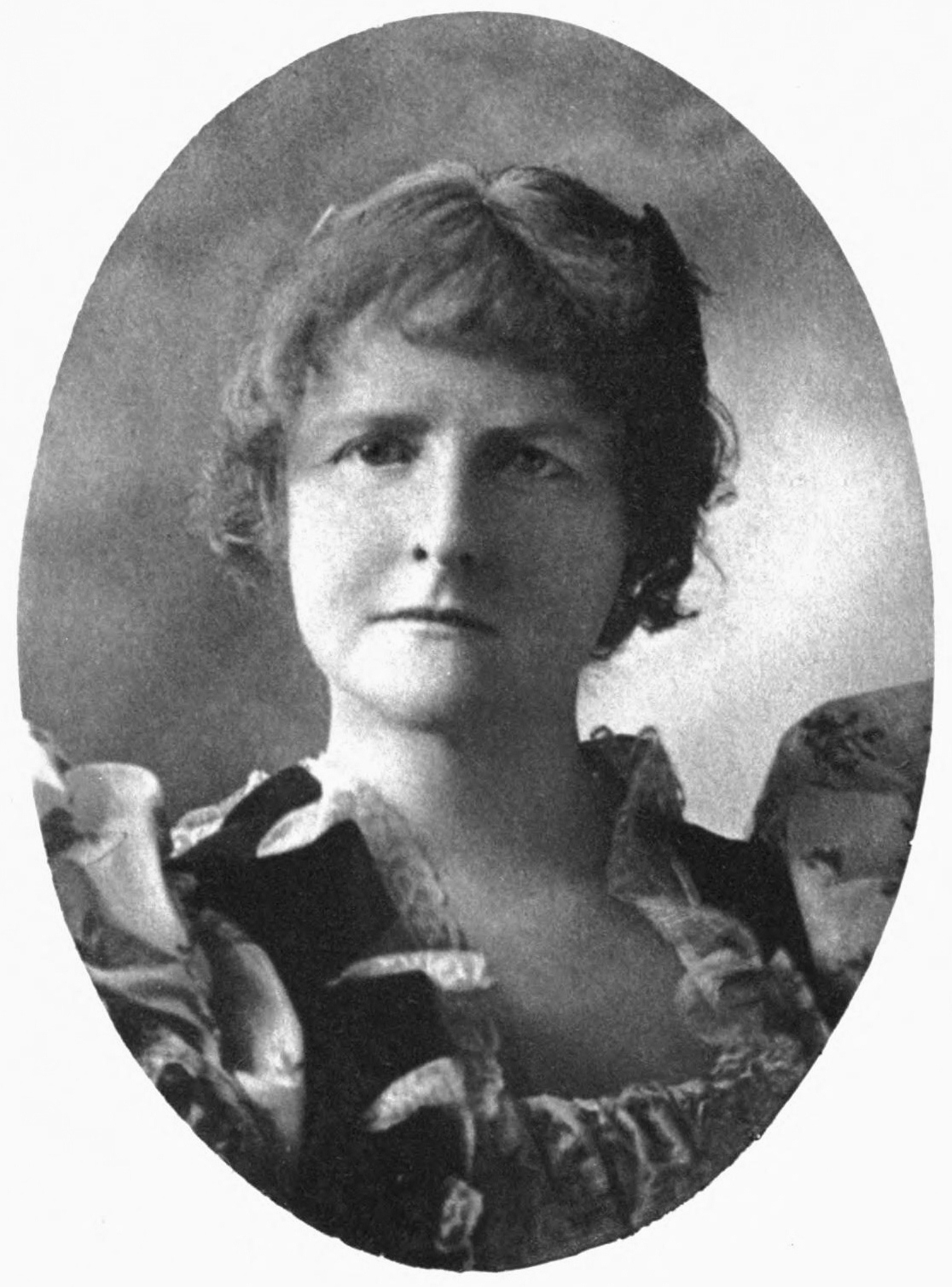
- Freeman in 1899
- Born: Mary Ella Wilkins; October 31, 1852; Randolph, Massachusetts, U.S.
- Died: March 13, 1930 (aged 77); Metuchen, New Jersey, U.S.
- Resting place: Hillside Cemetery, Scotch Plains, New Jersey
- Occupation: Novelist
- Spouse: Dr. Charles Manning Freeman (m.1902)
- Writing career
- Notable work: A New England Nun
- Notable awards: American Academy of Arts and Letters, 1926

Signature
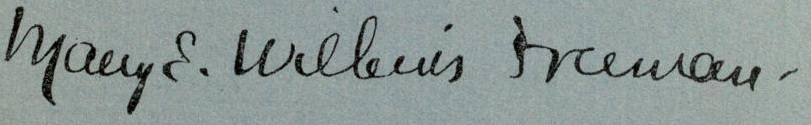

Mary Eleanor Wilkins Freeman (October 31, 1852 – March 13, 1930) was an American author. She is best known for her novel Pembroke, and also wrote a number of well-regarded ghost stories, which are still frequently anthologized.

== Biography ==
Freeman was born in Randolph, Massachusetts on October 31, 1852, to Eleanor Lothrop and Warren Edward Wilkins, who originally baptized her "Mary Ella". Her father was a descendant of Bray Wilkins. Freeman's parents were orthodox Congregationalists, and her upbringing was very strict. Religious constraints play a key role in some of her works.

As an adolescent, Freeman was increasingly caught between the need for her mother's love and her instinct to avoid becoming her mother and subsiding into her mother's form of passivity. Despite continuous pressure from her mother to participate in domestic chores, no amount of discipline could pull Mary away from her reading to the reality of hated kitchen work. According to Edward Foster's biography of Freeman, "Disliking her household duties, she avoided them, nor could she be moved by disciplinary tactics." A growing tension between Mary and her mother centered on her resistance to undertaking the tasks expected of a "good girl".

As the years passed, the contrast between Mary and her sister, Anna, became apparent. While her sister Anna willingly undertook domestic work and increasingly met her parents' expectations, Mary quietly began to reject them. She would resist her mother's world of domesticity throughout her entire life. Her story "The Revolt of Mother" is especially significant in this context, for the story seems to have been written as a tribute to her mother's work, a form of work she had never valued in her mother's lifetime.

In 1867, the family moved to Brattleboro, Vermont, where Freeman graduated from the local high school before attending Mount Holyoke College (then, Mount Holyoke Female Seminary) in South Hadley, Massachusetts, for one year, from 1870 to 1871. She later finished her education at Glenwood Seminary in West Brattleboro. When the family's dry goods business in Vermont failed in 1873, the family returned to Randolph, Massachusetts. Freeman's mother died three years later, and she changed her middle name to "Eleanor" in her memory.

Freeman's father died suddenly in 1883, leaving her without any immediate family and an estate worth only $973. Wilkins returned to her hometown of Randolph. She moved in with a friend, Mary J. Wales, and began writing as her only source of income.

During a visit to Metuchen, New Jersey, in 1892, she met Dr. Charles Manning Freeman, a non-practicing medical doctor seven years younger than she. After years of courtship and delays, the two were married on January 1, 1902. Immediately after, she firmly established her name as "Mary E. Wilkins Freeman", which she asked Harper's to use on all of her work. The couple built a home in Metuchen, where Freeman became a local celebrity for her writing, despite having occasionally published satirical fictional representations of her neighbors. Her husband suffered from alcoholism and an addiction to sleeping powders. He also had a reputation for driving fast horses and womanizing. He was committed to the New Jersey State Hospital for the Insane in Trenton, and the two legally separated a year later. After his death in 1923, he left the majority of his wealth to his chauffeur and only one dollar to his former wife.

In April 1926, Freeman became the first recipient of the William Dean Howells Medal for Distinction in Fiction from the American Academy of Arts and Letters.

Freeman suffered a heart attack and died in Metuchen on March 15, 1930, aged 77. She was laid to rest in Hillside Cemetery in Scotch Plains, New Jersey.

== Writing ==
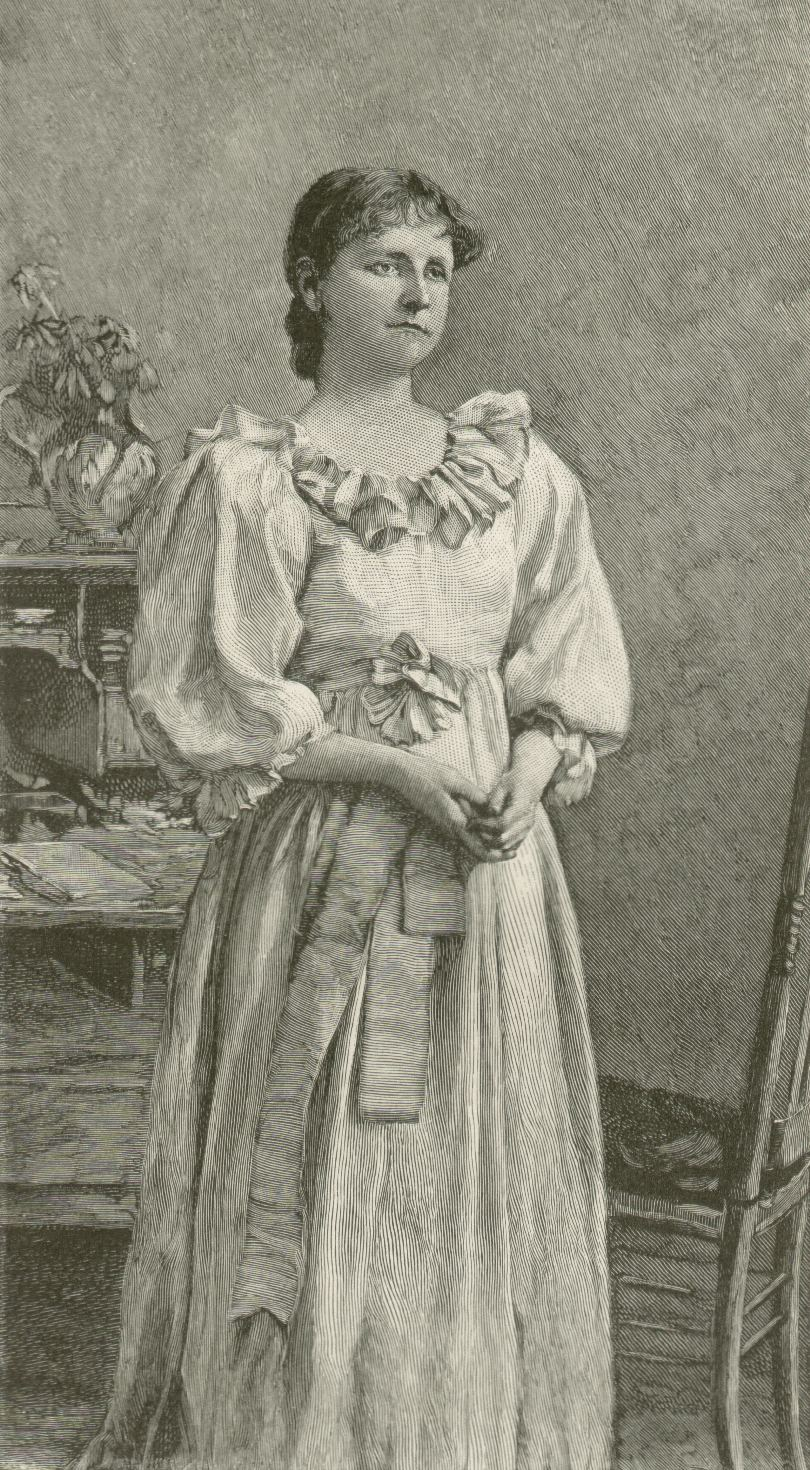
Mary E. Wilkins Freeman from the frontispiece of her novel Jane Field (1892)

Freeman began writing stories and verse for children while still a teenager to help support her family and was quickly successful. Her career as a short story writer launched in 1881 when she took first place in a short story contest with her submission “The Ghost Family.” When the supernatural caught her interest, the result was a group of short stories which combined domestic realism with supernaturalism and these have proved very influential. Her best known work was written in the 1880s and 1890s while she lived in Randolph. She produced more than two dozen volumes of published short stories and novels. She is best known for two collections of stories, A Humble Romance and Other Stories (1887) and A New England Nun and Other Stories (1891). Her stories deal mostly with New England life. Freeman is also remembered for her novel Pembroke (1894), and she contributed a notable chapter to the collaborative novel entitled The Whole Family (1908).

Through her different genres of work including children's stories, poems, and short stories, Mary Wilkins Freeman sought to demonstrate her values as a feminist. During the time which she was writing, she did this in nonconventional ways; for example, she diverged from making her female characters weak and in need of help which was a common trope in literature. Through characters such as Louisa in her short story: “A New England Nun,” Freeman challenges contemporary ideas concerning female roles, values, and relationships in society. Also, Freeman's short story “The Revolt of 'Mother'" illustrated the struggles of rural women and the role they played within their families. “The Revolt of 'Mother'” initiated the discussion on the rights of rural woman, went on to inspire many more pieces discussing the lack of control rural woman had over families finances, and looking to improve the structure of farm families in the early twentieth-century.

The one-act opera The Village Singer by Stephen Paulus was adapted from a Freeman short story; it was commissioned by Opera Theater of Saint Louis, and was premiered in 1979.

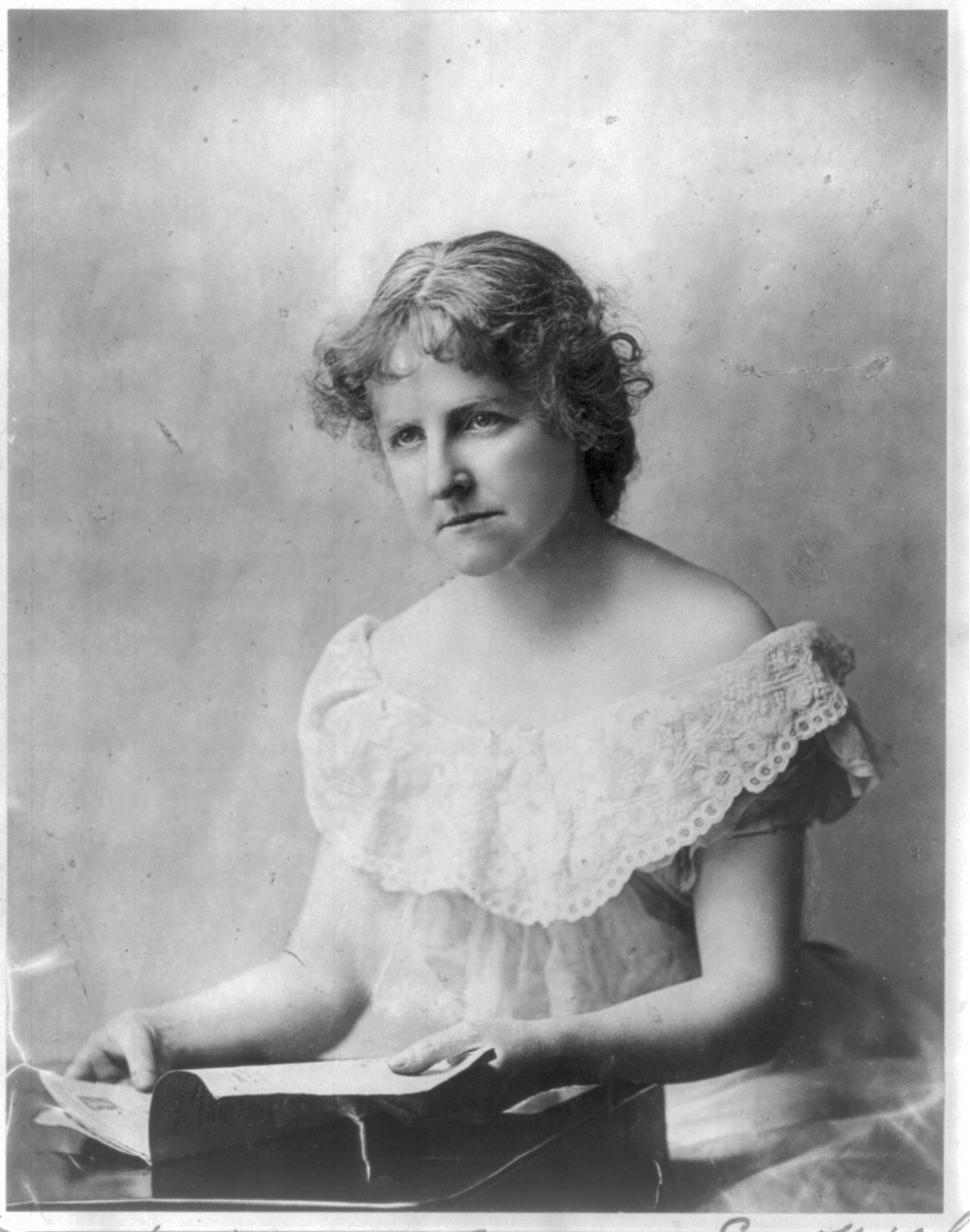
Mary Eleanor Wilkins Freeman, 1900.

Although she produced a dozen volumes of short stories and as many novels, Freeman is remembered chiefly for the first two collections of stories, A Humble Romance and Other Stories (1887) and A New England Nun and Other Stories (1891), and the novel Pembroke (1894) (Britannica Encyclopedia).

== Bibliography ==
- Decorative Plaques (1883)
- The Adventures of Ann (1886)
- A Humble Romance and Other Stories (1887)
- A New England Nun and Other Stories (1891)
- The Revolt of Mother (1891)
- Young Lucretia and Other Stories (1892)
- The Pot of Gold and Other Stories (1892)
- Jane Field (1892)
- Giles Corey, Yeoman (play, 1893)
- Pembroke (1894)
- Comfort Pease and Her Gold Ring (1895)
- Madelon (1896)
- Once Upon A Time (1897)
- Jerome, a Poor Man (1897)
- Silence, and other Stories (1898)

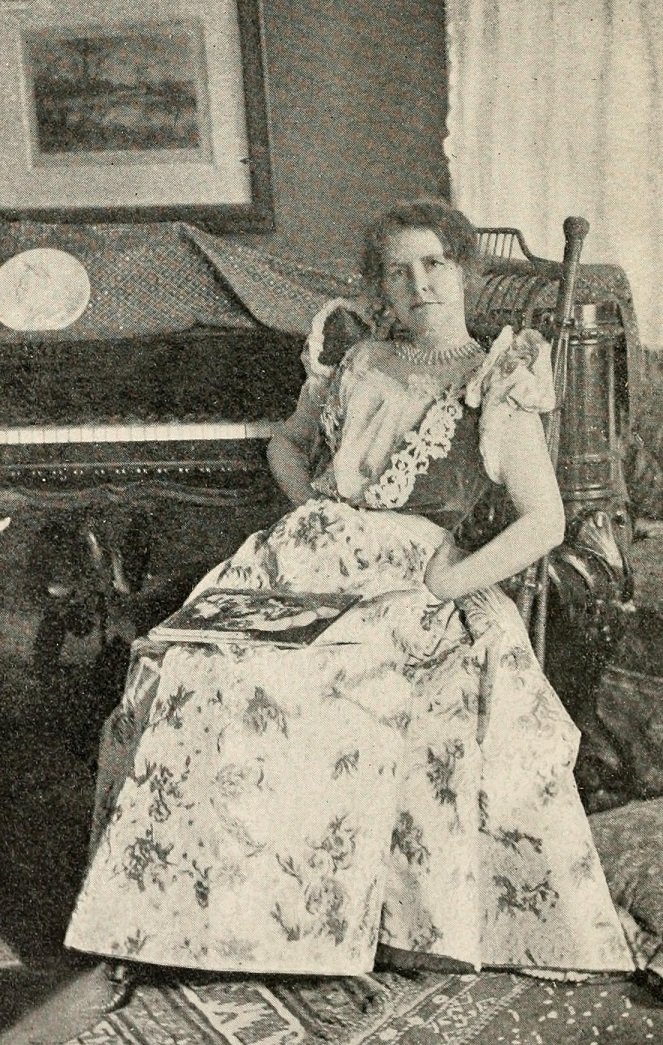
Mary E. Wilkins, from the inside cover of The People of Our Neighborhood (1898)

- People of Our Neighborhood (1898)
- Some of Our Neighbours (1898)
- In Colonial Times (1899)
- The Jamesons (1899)
- Evelina's Garden (1899)
- The Love of Parson Lord and Other Stories (1900)
- The Heart's Highway: A Romance of Virginia in the Seventeenth Century (1900)
- Understudies (1901)
- The Portion of Labor (1901)
- A Far-Away Melody and Other Stories (1902)
- Six Trees (1903)
- The Wind in the Rose Bush and Other Stories of the Supernatural (1903)
- The Givers and Other Stories (1904)
- The Debtor (1905)
- Doc Gordon (1906)
- The Fair Lavinia, and Others (1907)
- By the Light of the Soul (1907)
- The Shoulders of Atlas (1908)
- The Winning Lady, and Others (1909)
- The Green Door (1910)]
- The Butterfly House (1912)
- The Yates Pride (1912)
- The Copy–Cat, and Other Stories (1914)
- An Alabaster Box (1917)
- Edgewater People (1918)
- The Best Stories of Mary E. Wilkins (1927)
- Collected Ghost Stories (1974)

== See also ==
- Mary Wilkins Freeman House – Metuchen home, listed on the NRHP in Middlesex County, New Jersey

== Bibliography ==
- Glasser, Leah Blatt. In a Closet Hidden: The Life and Work of Mary E. Wilkins Freeman. Amherst: University of Mass. Press, 1996.
- Chisholm, Hugh, ed. (1911). "Wilkins, Mary Eleanor" . Encyclopædia Britannica (11th ed.). Cambridge University Press.
