= MUDAM =

Mudam Grand Duke Jean Museum of Modern Art
- Musée d'art moderne Grand-Duc Jean
- Established: 1 July 2006; 20 years ago
- Location: 3, Park Dräi Eechelen; L-1499 Luxembourg-Kirchberg; Luxembourg
- Coordinates: 49°37′01.51″N 06°08′23″E
- Type: Art museum
- Visitors: ▲134,000 (2018)
- Chairperson: Stéphanie, Grand Duchess of Luxembourg
- Architect: I. M. Pei
- Public transit access: Philharmonie-Mudam tram stop, LuxTram; Rout Bréck-Pafendall bus stop
- Parking: Parking Trois Glands
- Website: mudam.com

The Grand Duke Jean Museum of Modern Art (French: Musée d'art moderne Grand-Duc Jean), abbreviated to Mudam, is a museum of modern art in Luxembourg City, in southern Luxembourg. The museum stands on the site of the old Fort Thüngen, on the southwestern edge of the Kirchberg-plateau, in close proximity to many of the European Union institutions based within the city. (Note: Though the majority of the museum's structure is located in the neighbouring district of Clausen, which extends over the southwest edge of the Kirchberg plateau, its address formally designates it as being within the district of Kirchberg.)

== History ==
First proposed in 1989 and championed by then-Prime Minister Jacques Santer, the location of the future museum was much disputed, until it was agreed in 1997 to use Dräi Eechelen Park and connect the museum to Fort Thüngen. The building was designed by Pritzker Prize-winning architect I. M. Pei, and cost $100m to build. The museum was inaugurated on 1 July 2006 by Grand Duke Jean, to whom the building is dedicated, and opened to the public the following day.

As Luxembourg had no public modern art collection and the museum budget did not allow acquiring a modernist collection, the museum focused on contemporary art – its permanent collection includes works by 100 artists, including: Andy Warhol, Bruce Nauman, Julian Schnabel, Thomas Struth, and Daniel Buren.

Under the direction of Marie-Claude Beaud, in its first year of public opening, the museum achieved a record attendance of more than 115,000 visitors. The Mudam Boutique, located inside the building, offers a wide selection of contemporary art publications, postcards, and gift items ranging from toys to designer pieces. The Mudam Café offers a variety of gluten-free, vegetarian, and vegan dishes.

== Collections ==
The Museum's collections are set out on three floors and include works by many artists and designers such as Alvar Aalto, Marina Abramović, Bernd and Hilla Becher, Pierre Bismuth, Sophie Calle, Hussein Chalayan, Claude Closky, James Coleman, Tony Cragg, San Damon, Richard Deacon, Mark Dean, Stan Douglas, Jan Fabre, Ian Hamilton Finlay, Roland Fischer, Günther Förg, Gilbert & George, Nan Goldin, Andreas Gursky, Peter Halley, Thomas Hirschhorn, Fabrice Hybert, Suki Seokyeong Kang, William Kentridge, Mark Lewis, Richard Long, Michel Majerus, Christian Marclay, Martin Margiela, Steve McQueen, Bruce Nauman, Shirin Neshat, Albert Oehlen, Blinky Palermo, Philippe Parreno, Grayson Perry, Fiona Rae, Pipilotti Rist, Thomas Ruff, Charles Sandison, Joe Scanlan (artist), Thomas Scheibitz, Julian Schnabel, Cindy Sherman, Thomas Struth, Wolfgang Tillmans, Cy Twombly and Kara Walker.

== Exhibitions ==
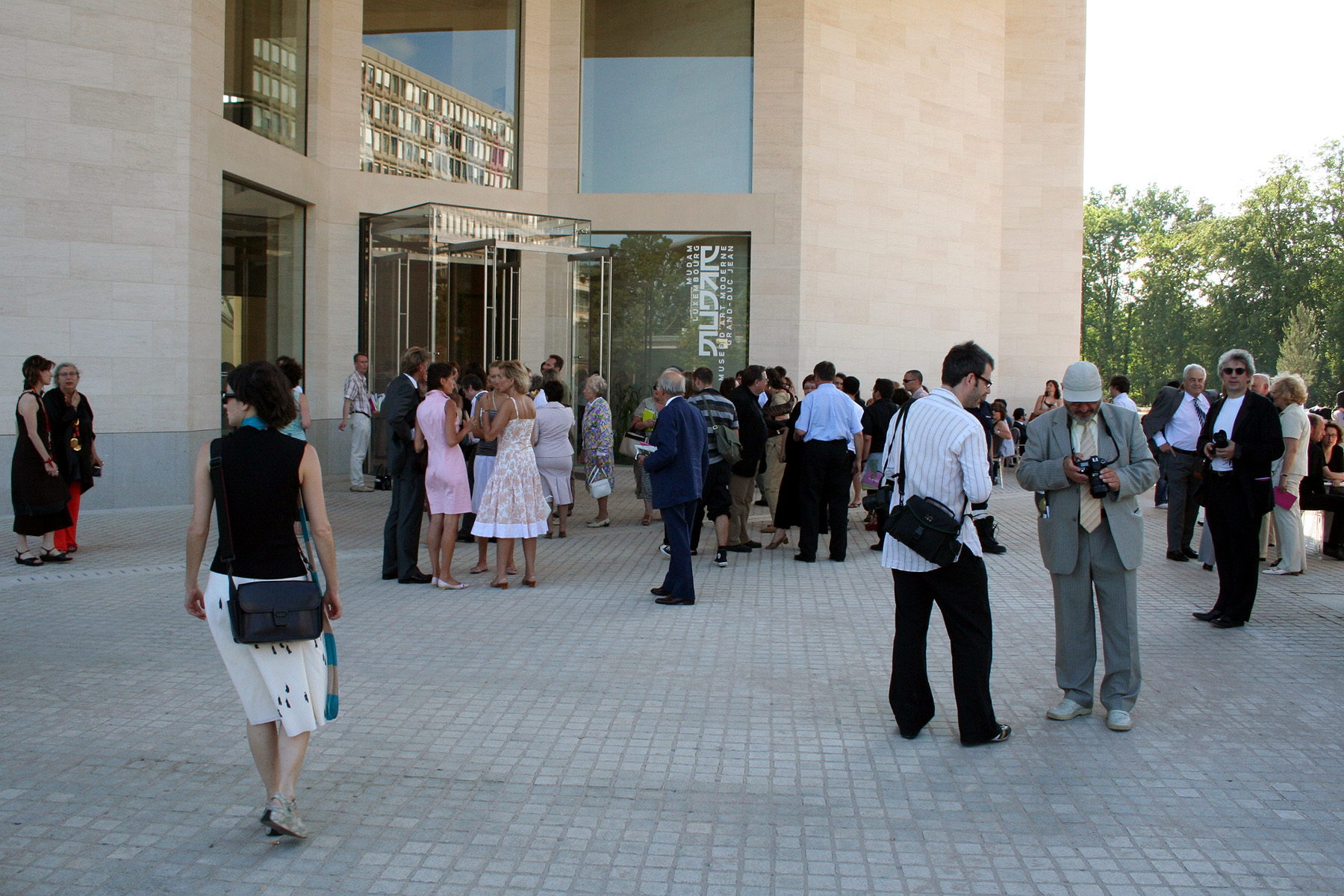
Mudam entrance

- Eldorado (opening exhibition) 1 July 2006 – 20 November 2006.
- Michel Majerus (European retrospective) 9 December 2006 – 7 May 2007.
- TOMORROW NOW – when design meets science fiction, 25 May 2007 – 24 September 2007.
- "bloom! Experiments in Color Photography by Edward Steichen" 14 July 2007 – 3 September 2007
- "Glenn Ligon: some changes" 13 October 2007 – 19 February 2008
- Mudam Guest House 07: François Boisrond, Marie Cool & Fabio Balducci, Pascal Convert, Wim Delvoye, Thomas Demand, James P. Graham, Charles Kaisin, Vera Weisgerber, Simon Jacquard, Yazid Oulab, Jan Wangaard 13 October 2007 – 26 November 2007
- "A propos des lieux d'origine, Portugal Agora" (Panorama of Portuguese contemporary creation) 15 December 2007 – 7 April 2008
- "Michel Paysant – Nusquam" 15 December 2007 – 7 April 2008
- Frédéric Prat 6 March 2008 – 26 May 2008
- Out of Storage I – chosen paintings from the Collection : Rosson Crow, Dominique Gauthier, Peter Halley, Federico Herrero, Jonathan Lasker, Michel Majerus, Jean-Luc Moerman, Frank Nitsche, Albert Oehlen, Fiona Rae, Thomas Scheibitz, Juan Uslé 6 March 2008 – 26 May 2008
- China Power Station: Part III : Cao Fei, Chen Qiulin, Chu Yun, Hu Xiangqian, Ji Weiyu, Kan Xuan, Liu Wei, Ou Ning, Qiu Anxiong, Xu Zhen, Xue Tao, Yang Fudong, Zhang Ding, Zhou Tao... 26 April 2008 – 1 September 2008
- Candice Breitz – Be My Somebody 26 April 2008 – 22 September 2008
- H Box 14 May 2008 – 23 June 2008
- Grayson Perry – My Civilisation 19 June 2008 – 22 September 2008
- Thomas Scheibitz – about 90 elements / TOD IM DSCHUNGEL 19 June 2008 – 22 September 2008
- Laurent Pariente 3 July 2008 – 15 September 2008
- Nouvelles Formes, Pierre Charpin à Sèvres 11 October 2008 – 7 November 2008
- Ettore Sottsass & Sottsass Associati 11 October 2008 – 1 December 2008
- John Lurie – Bones are on the Outside 11 October 2008 – 8 December 2008
- Go East I – Mudam Collection supported by KBL European Private Bankers 11 October 2008 – 8 December 2008
- ELO. Inner Exile – Outer Limits: 11 October 2008 – 2 February 2009
- RRRIPP!! Paper Fashion 11 October 2008 – 8 December 2008
- Ena Swansea 11 October 2008 – 2 February 2008
- Finns at Venini 11 October 2008 – 8 December 2008
- Jochen Gerner – Home 18 December 2008 – 2 March 2009
- Laure Tixier – Plaid Houses in the framework of the project "Home" 18 December 2008 – 2 March 2009
- The Space of Words 19 February 2009 – 25 May 2009
- Moving Stills in the framework of "Mois Européen de la Photographie / Mutations II 19 February 2009–25 May 2009
- Dominique Petitgand . La porte ne s'est pas ouverte (The door didn't open) 19 February 2009–25 May 2009
- Beyond Kiosk . Modes of Multiplication 15 March 2009–13 September 2009
- Nikolay Polissky . Large Hadron Collider in the framework of "Habiter" 7 May 2009 – 13 September 2009
- Guillaume Leblon 18 June 2009 – 13 September 2009
- Florian Pumhösl 18 June 2009 – 13 September 2009
- Out of Storage II . Rythmes 18 June 2009 – 13 September 2009
- Jerszy Seymour . Coalition of Amateurs 18 June 2009 – 13 September 2009
- Claire Barclay 10 October 2009 – 3 January 2010
- Olivier Foulon 10 October 2009 – 3 January 2010
- Didier Marcel 10 October 2009 – 3 January 2010
- Tomás Saraceno 10 October 2009 – 3 January 2010
- Go East II . Mudam Collection supported by KBL European Private Bankers 10 October 2009 – 3 January 2010
- Robert Stadler 10 October 2009 – 3 January 2010
- Steven C. Harvey – Vehicles 2 June 2012 – 23 September 2012
- Eppur Si Muove. Art et Technique, Un Espace Partage 9 July 2015 – 17 January 2016
- Robert Stadler Quiz 2 20 February 2016 – 22 May 2016
- Alexandra Pirici & Manuel Pelmus Public Collection 2 July 2016 – 10 July 2016
- Beatrice Gibson 20 February 2016 – 29 May 2016
- Sarah Oppenheimer S-399390 20 February 2016 – 29 May 2016
- Demien Deroubaix Picasso et Moi 20 February 2016 – 29 May 2016
- Fiona Tan Geography of Time 20 February 2016 – 28 August 2016
- Yuri Suzuki. Acoustic Pavilion: Experience Beauty through Sound 27 April 2016 – 28 August 2016
- Flatland 7 October 2017 – 2 April 2018 Curators: Marianne Derrien, Sarah Ihler-Meyer. Artists: Laëtitia Badaut Haussmann, Francis Baudevin, Philippe Decrauzat, Marie-Michelle Deschamps, Angela Detanico / Rafael Lain, Hoël Duret, Sylvie Fanchon, Liam Gillick, Mark Hagen, Christian Hidaka, Sonia Kacem, Tarik Kiswanson, Vera Kox, Sarah Morris, Reinhard Mucha, Damián Navarro, Camila Oliveira Fairclough, Bruno Peinado, Julien Prévieux, Eva Taulois, John Tremblay, Pierre Vadi, Elsa Werth, Raphaël Zarka
- Jeff Wall 5 October 2018 - 6 January 2019
- Jutta Koether 16 February 2019 – 12 May 2019
- Robert Morris – The Perceiving Body 7 February 2020 – 1 May 2020
- Peter Halley. Conduits: Paintings from the 1980s 31 March 2023 – 15 October 2023

== See also ==
- List of museums in Luxembourg
