= Collector =

Collector(s) may refer to:

== Arts and entertainment ==
- Collector (2008 film), an American short thriller film
- Collector (2011 film), an Indian Malayalam film
- Collector (2016 film), a Russian film
- Collectors (film), a 2020 South Korean film
- Collectors (TV series), an Australian television series
- Collector (album), 2025
- Collector (character), a fictional character in the Marvel Comics universe
- Collectors, a fictional insectoid race in the video game Mass Effect 2
- "Collectors", a short story by Raymond Carver from his collection Will You Please Be Quiet, Please?
- Collector Records, an American folk label founded by Joe Glazer
- skekLach the Collector, a Skeksis character from The Dark Crystal: Age of Resistance

== Places ==
- Collector, New South Wales, a town in Australia
- Collector Parish, Argyle, New South Wales, Australia

== Technology ==
- In automotive engineering, a part of some extractor manifolds
- In electronics, a part of a bipolar junction transistor
- In water treatment, a class of chemicals used in froth flotation
- A current collector
  - A collector shoe on a bogie

== Other uses ==
- A person whose hobby is collecting
- Collector road, a type of road leading from local roads to busier areas
- District collector or simply collector, in India, a government appointee in charge of a district in a state
- Collector, in finance, an employee of a collection agency
- A procurer of specimens for a scientific collection

== See also ==
- The Collector (disambiguation)
- Collection (disambiguation)
