= Leah Blatt Glasser =

American literary critic and academic

- Occupation: Professor
- Writing career
- Genre: American literature
- Notable works: In a Closet Hidden: The Life and Work of Mary E. Wilkins Freeman

Leah Blatt Glasser is an American literary critic and Mary Eleanor Wilkins Freeman scholar at Mount Holyoke College. She was Dean of First-Year Studies and is currently a lecturer in English at Mount Holyoke College. Her former student (the Pulitzer Prize-winning playwright, Suzan-Lori Parks) would later credit Glasser for her success.

== Background ==
Glasser received her B.A. degree in 1972, her M.A. in 1973 from the State University of New York at Stony Brook, and her Ph.D. from Brown University in 1982. She has taught at Mount Holyoke College since year 1980 and is a contributing editor to the Heath Anthology of American Fiction.

== Publications ==
- A Landscape of One's Own: Nature-Writing and Women's Autobiography (forthcoming)
- In a Closet Hidden: The Life and Work of Mary E. Wilkins Freeman (University of Massachusetts Press, 1996).
- "She Is the One You Call Sister: Discovering Mary E. Wilkins Freeman", in Between Women, ed. Ascher, DeSalvo, and Ruddick (Routledge Press, 1994).
- Contributing Editor to The Heath Anthology of American Literature and Teaching Guidelines, Heath, 1997.
