= The Pot of Gold and Other Stories =

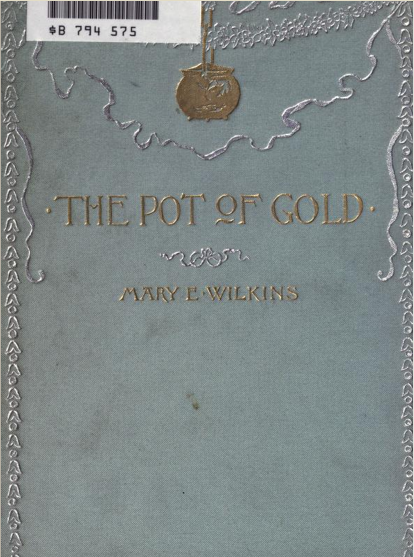
- Author: Mary Eleanor Wilkins Freeman
- Language: English
- Genre: Short story
- Published: D. Lothrop Company (1892)
- Publication place: United States
- Media type: Print
- Pages: 335

The Pot of Gold and Other Stories is a collection of children's short stories written by American author Mary Eleanor Wilkins Freeman. First published in 1892 by D. Lothrop Company in Boston, the stories are set in the villages of New England. Hiding beneath the child-friendly narration of these sixteen stories, Wilkins comments on New England village life and the post-Civil war woman.

== Contents ==
- "The Pot of Gold" - a young girl's ambitious journey leads her to find true treasure
- "The Cow With Golden Horns" - a farm girl's sacrifice for her father ends in reward
- "Princess Rosetta and the Pop-corn Man" - a missing Princess brings back together two dueling Kingdoms
- "The Christmas Monks" - a poor boy's good behavior earns him employment in a magical garden
- "The Pumpkin Giant" - a country terrorized by a monster gets a tasty revenge
- "The Christmas Masquerade" - a costumer's trick on a king's extravagant event betters the lives of children
- "Dill" - a daughter's harmless charm leads to a family reunion
- "The Silver Hen" - a school teachers quest for her missing pet brings two neighbors back together
- "Toby" - the story of a man who marries the wrong woman
- "The Patchwork School" - a new type of reform school is introduced, scaring the children of the town
- "The Squire's Sixpence"- in the quest to do the right thing, a school girl runs into trouble
- "A Plain Case" - an unsuspecting boy is accused of telling a lie
- "A Stranger in the Village" - a royal heir causes excitement within a village
- "The Bound Girl" - a girl is sent to service a family, but her mischief gets her in trouble
- "Deacon Thomas Wales's Will" - a girl grows out of her mischievous ways and becomes a proper young lady
- "The Adopted Daughter" - a new appreciation for each other leads a girl and her guardian to become family

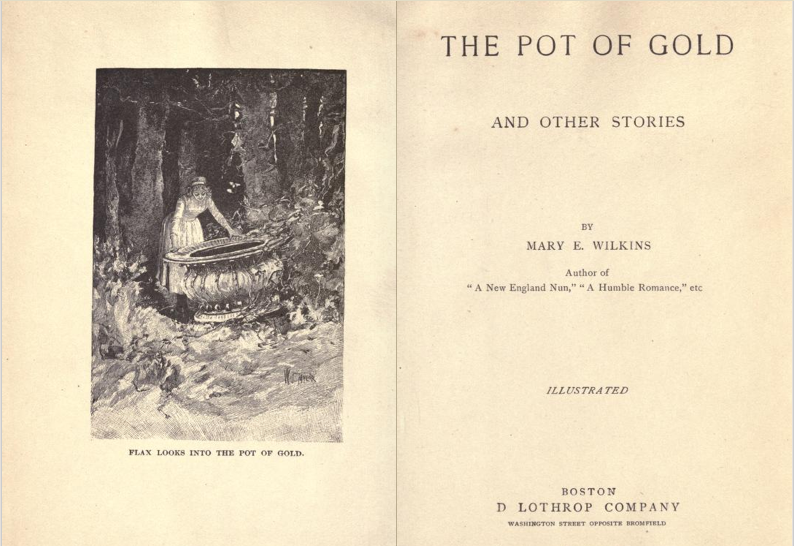
title page

== Sales ==
In the article “Mary Wilkins Freeman: One Hundred Years of Criticism” Mary Reichardt references the audience of Wilkins's short stories, stating that while her female audience was implied, there was also a widespread male audience as well. Reichardt states, however, that after World War 1, the feminist movement collapsed and the sales of Wilkins's work plummeted (Reichardt, 35).
