= Pembroke (novel) =

Novel by Mary Eleanor Wilkins Freeman

Pembroke (1894) is a novel written by Mary E. Wilkins Freeman. It is set in the small US town of Pembroke, Massachusetts, in the 1830s and 1840s. The novel tells the story of a romance gone awry and the dramatic events that follow, which entertain the residents of the small town for years after. As one of Freeman's first novels, Pembroke experienced great success in its time and, although it has only recently experienced a comeback in the academic sphere, it is known for being an exemplary piece of New England local color fiction.

== Plot summary ==
The novel begins with the breaking off of the engagement between Barney Thayer and Charlotte Barnard after Charlotte's father and Barney get into a heated political argument.

Upon ending their engagement, Barney moves into the house that was intended to be the home of him and Charlotte after their wedding. Members of both Barney's family and Charlotte's family appeal to Barney to return to Charlotte and fix their engagement, but in his mind there is no alternative to the way things are. He continues to live in the unfinished house alone. Although Charlotte has the opportunity to marry Thomas Payne, a wealthy and worthy member of her town, she declines his offer, stating that she is not in love with him and could only ever marry Barney. Charlotte continues to live in her parents' home, taking on work as a seamstress and wedding assistant.

Sylvia Crane, Charlotte's aunt, is involved in a long-term courtship with Richard Alger that provides a source of wonder to the townspeople. No one seems to know the details of their relationship, and even Sylvia and Richard do not seem to know where they are trying to go.

At one point, Richard tells Sylvia that they should not see each other anymore and stops visiting her, which breaks Sylvia's heart. This continues for a few years, until Richard witnesses Sylvia being taken to the poorhouse. Richard finally takes control of the situation, returns Sylvia to her home, and promises to make up for the bad ways he has treated her. Sylvia and Richard are then married.

Rebecca Thayer, Barney's sister, and William Berry have a scandalous affair. Despite being forbidden by her mother to see William, who is Charlotte's cousin, Rebecca proceeds to have a several-month-long courtship with William that entails her sneaking out of the house on several occasions to see him. Although the whole town is aware of this, no one says a word to either of Rebecca's parents, who remain oblivious. Deborah eventually becomes aware of what her daughter has been up to when she is making a dress for Rebecca and notices her swollen belly, recognizing that she is pregnant.

Deborah kicks Rebecca out in the middle of a terrible snowstorm. Later that night, Deborah goes to Barney and commands him to find William and make him marry Rebecca. Barney and William eventually find Rebecca at the home of the town recluse, where Rebecca and William are married by the minister. As there is no longer any love between Rebecca and William, they leave town.

After Charlotte and Barney's engagement ends, Rose Berry begins to show interest in Barney. This is quickly put to an end when Charlotte becomes aware of what her cousin is up to and Barney begins to avoid Rose. Rose moves on to Tommy Ray, despite the fact that she knows he is not a good match and she still thinks of him as a boy. Nonetheless, after several months of courtship Rose and Tommy are married, providing the only example of a typical courtship in the novel.

Silas Berry, father of Rose and William, further ostracizes himself through his greed when he offers to let his children have a party at his cherry orchard for all the young people of Pembroke. The party ensues happily, but as the guests are leaving, Silas approaches them with a bill for the cherries they ate. This action leads to the utter embarrassment of William and Rose, and prevents Silas from making a profit from his cherry orchard.

The town is also rocked by the death of Ephraim Thayer, Barney's brother. Because Deborah Thayer viewed her other children, Barney and Rebecca, as lost causes, all her hope was placed in her youngest son who is quite ill with some type of heart ailment. Having been ill his entire life, Ephraim always received stronger amounts of Deborah's sternness. He lived a solitary childhood, never getting to experience and of the typical joys of youth. His mother always kept him on a strict diet and schedule, which contained nothing of what he wanted to do. As he gets older, Ephraim becomes more and more rebellious. He begins to sneak snacks that he is forbidden to eat, gives his mother a hard time when she tells him to do things, and secretly thinks of all the things he would do were she not around. One night Ephraim sneaks out to go sledding, knowing this is strictly against his mother's rules. The next day Ephraim fails to carry out one of Deborah's orders. She whips Ephraim, despite the fact that he had always been spared such a punishment due to his poor health. He dies in the middle of the whipping. Deborah is eventually made aware of Ephraim's joyride, which is most likely the cause of his death, but Ephraim's death is too much for her to handle. Deborah dies suddenly, leaving her widower, Caleb, to live alone in their house.

The end of the novel brings focus back to Charlotte and Barney. It has been about ten years since their engagement was ended, and the town has stopped overflowing with rumors about them. Barney has taken up work as a woodcutter, and suddenly falls severely ill with rheumatism. Despite her parents’ wishes, Charlotte maintains her dedication to Barney by going to take care of him. Once again, the town begins to talk. Everyone disapproves of Charlotte staying in Barney's house to nurse him when they are unwed. The townspeople send the minister to Charlotte to convey their feelings. Barney realizes the trouble he is bringing to Charlotte and tells her to leave his house.

Charlotte says nothing, packs her things, and heads home. Barney then experiences a change. He becomes aware of the wrong he has been doing to Charlotte all these years, and the fact that Charlotte is still devoted to him brings him great guilt. Barney undergoes a type of spiritual healing that miraculously brings him back to health. The story is drawn to a close with the hopeful image of Barney walking up to the Barnard house, and announcing to Charlotte that he is back.

== Characters ==
Barney Thayer is the son of Deborah and Caleb Thayer. He is a central character of the novel, as his engagement to Charlotte Barnard sets the stage for the story. Barney is a very stubborn man, whose bullheadedness is the reason for his unhappiness throughout the novel. In the novel, Barney develops a hunched-back, which is a symbol of the inner turmoil he experiences while being separated from Charlotte.

Charlotte Barnard is the daughter of Sarah and Cephas Barnard. She is a proud and stubborn character, taking after the personality of her father more than that of her mother. Charlotte seems to always be aware of other people's suffering, particularly of Barney's. Her actions often do not fit in with what is expected of a female at the time.

Caleb Thayer is Barney's father. Caleb is a meek man, often reminiscent of a child. He does not hold the typical place of the patriarchal father, and instead allows his wife, Deborah, to rule the house. Caleb is sympathetic to his children and the harshness they endure from their mother.

Deborah Thayer is Barney's mother. A harsh, stern woman, she intimidates most of the townsfolk. She serves as the de facto family patriarch and rationalizes her harsh behavior through her religious motives. She brings about her own demise by her inability to sympathize with anyone and the responsibility she places on herself for the actions of her children.

Rebecca Thayer is Barney's sister and the daughter of Caleb and Deborah. Rebecca is also stubborn and goes against the will of her mother when she continues to see William Berry. Rebecca plays the role of the "fallen woman" in the novel, as she begins in a place of respect and falls down the social ladder due to her premarital affair with William.

Ephraim Thayer is the youngest son of Deborah and Caleb. He suffers from a heart ailment that prevents him from leading a normal childhood. Despite his mother's attempts to make him as religious as she is, Ephraim is just as rebellious as his siblings.

Cephas Barnard is married to Sarah and father of Charlotte. Cephas is the reason behind the argument that ended Charlotte and Barney's engagement. Cephas fills the typical role of patriarchal father. He is known for holding strange views on the link between a person's spirit and the food he or she consumes.

Sarah Barnard is married to Cephas and mother of Charlotte. She is a dramatic woman, who is easily made anxious or overly emotional. She performs the typical housewife role and believes in everything Cephas does and says.

Sylvia Crane is the sister of Sarah Barnard and Hannah Berry, and Charlotte's aunt. Sylvia is a relatively quiet and independent woman, who lives alone in the house she inherited from her parents. Sylvia is younger than her sisters, but has an old spirit. She kept all of her hopes in Richard Alger, even when it appeared that their relationship might be over.

Richard Alger is the man who eventually marries Sylvia Crane, after an approximately eighteen-year courtship. Richard never seems to know exactly what he wants and treats Sylvia poorly, but redeems himself in the end when he saves Sylvia from the poorhouse and marries her.

Hannah Berry is the sister of Sarah and Sylvia and wife of Silas Berry. While she is very upfront and her personality can seem slightly abrasive, she has a certain kind of loyalty to her family members that cannot be shaken.

Rose Berry is the daughter of Hannah and Silas Berry and is Charlotte's cousin. Rose is a typical teenage girl, who is easily distracted by the prospect of love. However, Rose also believes that females should take an aggressive role in their love lives, as she demonstrates by telling Charlotte to pursue Barney and through her own active role in her love life.

William Berry is the son of Hannah and Silas Berry and the brother of Rose. William is a responsible young man, who takes responsibility for his actions. When he learns that Rebecca has been kicked out of her house, he does not hesitate to marry her, even though he is no longer as in love with her as he once was.

Silas Berry is the father of Rose and William and the husband of Hannah. Silas is a very greedy man, whose constant search for economic power causes him to be disliked by many of the townspeople. However, Silas is old and crippled and is easily intimidated by the youth and strength of his son.

Thomas Payne is the son of the town squire. He is a wealthy, handsome, and respectable man. After Barney and Charlotte break their engagement, Charlotte recognizes Thomas as a respectable option, even a better man than Barney, but cannot marry him because she does not love him. Thomas handles this situation with grace, like he does all others.

Mrs. Sloane is the town drunkard. She is ostracized and looked down upon by the townspeople, who avoid her as much as possible. When Rebecca is banished from her home, it is Mrs. Sloane who finds her, takes her in, and walks her through the process of marrying William.

Tommy Ray works at Silas Berry's store. Rose eventually chooses him as her marriage opportunity despite the fact that she sees him as a boy, not a man.

== Critical response ==
Pembroke was Freeman's second novel and received much acclaim. The content of the book appealed to a large audience, who were already avid fans of Freeman's short stories. At the time, the novel was regarded as "the most profound, the most powerful piece of fiction of its kind that has ever come to the American press" by Kate Chopin and received similar praise from other contemporary writers. Sir Arthur Conan Doyle, said of the book, "I have not read a book for a long time that has stirred me as much ... I think she [Freeman] is a very great writer. It is always risky to call a recent book a classic, but this one really seems to me to have every characteristic of one."

Due to its overwhelming popularity, Pembroke brought in a substantial amount of money for Freeman, mostly through its publication in the Harper's Weekly.
