= Michel Paysant =

French artist

Michel Paysant (born 1955 in Bouzonville in France) is a French artist. He is noted for his OnLAB (Laboratoire d'Oeuvres Nouvelles) research project which branches art, science and technology. He exhibited his "Nusquam" at the Mudam museum of Luxembourg between 15 December 2007 and 7 April 2008, and has also exhibited at the Louvre between 26 November 2009 and March 2010. He is a skilled sculptor, artist, participant and specialist in nanoscopic works with emphasis on the fusion of the arts and science. He believes that the "world of science and the arts never cross" and works to "build bridges between these two worlds".
