= The Jamesons =

1899 novel by Mary E. Wilkins

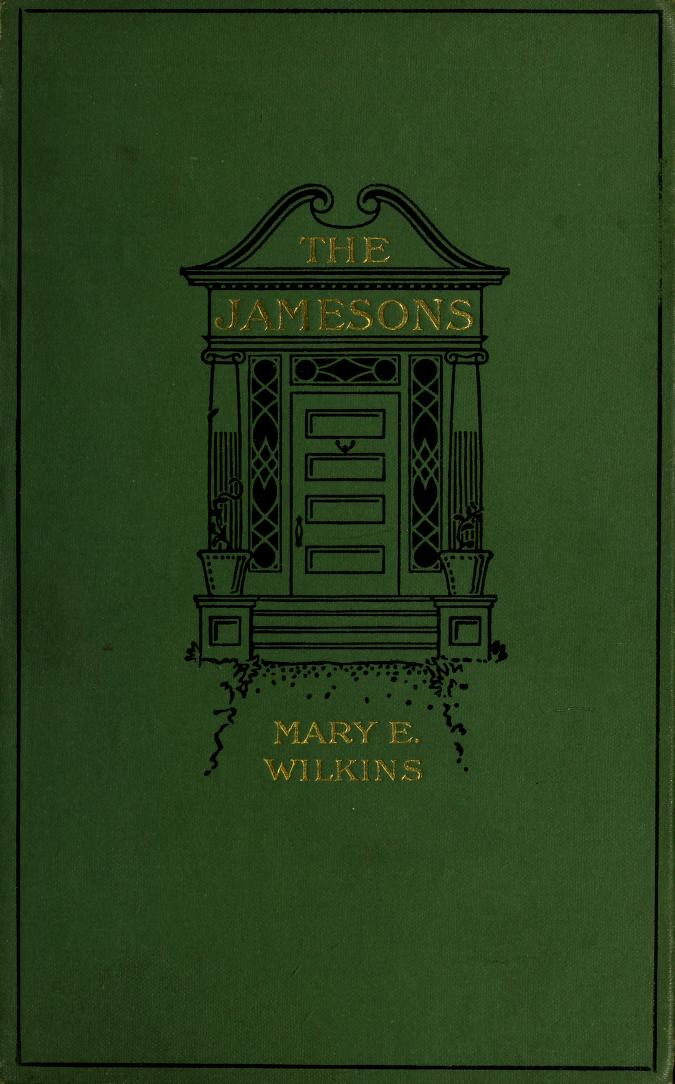
- Cover of first publication, 1899
- Author: Mary E. Wilkins
- Language: English
- Genre: Fiction
- Publisher: Curtis Publishing Company
- Publication date: 1899
- Publication place: United States of America
- Pages: 177

The Jamesons is a novel by American writer Mary E. Wilkins, first published in 1899. It is narrated in the first person by a character named Sophia. The story she tells began six years before and takes place in a small New England town, often referred to as a village, named Linnville. The town is set in the country and is composed of a small community where people are by no means rich, but are able to live comfortably. The lifestyles and traditions of the community are disrupted, in both positive and negative ways, when the Jamesons come to town. The Jamesons are a very wealthy family from New York City who come to Linville for the summer, and eventually buy a permanent summer home there. The mother of the family, Mrs. H. Boardman Jameson, tries to “improve” the community through readings of formal literature and attempts to change the way the people eat, dress and decorate their homes on both the interior and the exterior. Many people are unhappy about her superior attitude and total disregard of other people's opinions on the changes she attempts to make, but she gains respect at the end of the novel after planning an elaborate Centennial celebration for the town.

== Plot summary ==
The residents of Linnville prided themselves on the lack of tourism and absence of a summer hotel. Never having boarders before, the Liscom family, accepted the Jamesons when they came to town in search for a place to stay. Their arrival caused a great commotion as the Jamesons son, Cobb, saw smoke inside his new temporary residence and proceeded to run outside and yell “Fire!” Word quickly traveled down the street and a crowd formed outside the Liscom's as firemen drenched the entire house. Mrs. Caroline Liscom was furious that her house was soaked with water when the smoke was only caused by her chimney, and as a result was rude to her new boarders. Mrs. Jameson tried to find a new place to live in response to her host's rudeness, but had no such luck and both families were forced to live under the roof for the next several weeks.

The Jamesons consisted of a mother, a father, two daughters, one son and a grandmother. Mrs. Jameson quickly gave her family a bad reputation at a Linnville annual picnic several days after her arrival. She made an announcement to the village that their unhealthy foods were “poison” and further insults them as she says that their rich pies and cakes causes the insanity and dyspepsia in people of their social class, so they should only eat the health foods she consumes. In attempt to avoid an altercation, the people of Linnville respond as politely as possible and continue on with the picnic as though nothing happened.

Mrs. Jameson proceeds to insult the women of the village at their next meeting - the Ladies' Sewing Circle. It is at this meeting that the women become aware that Mrs. Jameson is trying to improve the women as she interrupts the meeting to “improve their minds and enlarge their spheres” by reading passages from Robert Browning. The women are not entertained by her reading, but once again are respectful when she is done lecturing them.

Several weeks later, the Jamesons return to the city for the winter and the next chapter begins their second summer in Linnville. For their second summer, they purchase their own home and farm to run. Mrs. Jameson is clueless as to how a farm should be run, and as a result is the victim of some tricks when purchasing animals for the barn. Besides the barn, there are some other changes Mrs. Jameson has made herself and she tries to impose them on the community, as she did with her health foods the previous summer. First, she stops wearing the fancy city clothes she had worn in the past and begins wearing what she thinks is most practical for a country person to wear. She proceeds to insult and instruct the other women to adopt the same style as her. Some women do follow her, but many do not.

Mrs. Jameson continues to make bold statements against the traditions of Linnville and paints her house red with dark shutters, while every other house is white with green shutters. She then decides that the town would look better if the houses had ivy growing on them, and plants ivy around everyone's homes, without their permission. It is later discovered this ivy is poison ivy and she has to go back to the houses and remove it all. She tries to change the interiors of people's homes as well by getting rid of framed-coffin plates of deceased loved ones in the parlors, a common décor in the homes of Linnville.

With every act against the norms of Linnville, Mrs. Jameson gets more and more enemies. She is so distracted with trying to “improve” Linnville that she does not notice that one of her daughters is in a clandestine relationship with the Liscom boy, who Mrs. Jameson does not approve of due to his family's inferior social standing to her own. Eventually, the young lovers are caught, and both of their mothers are furious. Mrs. Liscom does not approve of Harriett Jameson because she is not trained in housekeeping. An expected turn of events leads Mrs. Liscom to adore Harriett though, and the two get married at the end of the novel.

The unexpected change occurs during a Centennial party that Mrs. Jameson organizes for the town's 100th birthday. She collects the oldest furniture from houses all around the town and decorates the oldest house in town with all of it. She invites celebrities with connections to Linnville, organizes a parade, and sets up a dinner with speeches from honorable people. The event goes well and many people have a newfound respect for Mrs. Jameson but towards the end, Harriett's dress catches on fire, putting an end to the celebration. It is Mrs. Liscom who saves Harriett, and from that moment on they become very close to each other. Harriett does not suffer from any severe wounds, and takes housekeeping lessons from Mrs. Liscom until the wedding. Mrs. Jameson accepts Harry Liscom as her son-in-law as well and in the end, people learn to love the Jameson family collectively and are happy they came to town, despite the drama they brought along with them.

== Characters ==
Mrs. H. Boardman Jameson is the protagonist of the novel. She is a wealthy woman with weak nerves and has very particular wants and needs. She refuses to eat unhealthy foods, and looks down upon those who do. When she wants to make changes in the town she often assumes permission without asking anyone, and therefore is not very well liked throughout the majority of the novel.

Sophia is the first-person narrator of the story. She is a widow and has a heart condition. She does not know how to react to Mrs. Jameson's actions in the beginning and middle of the novel, but grows to adore her by the end. She also loves Harriet Jameson and supports her relationship with Harry Liscom.

Mrs. Caroline Liscom is the most notable housekeeper and probably the wealthiest woman in Linnville, besides Mrs. Jameson. She takes the Jamesons in as boarders. She has the reputation of being a strong character, and is the head of her family. She has trouble believing things she does not want to be true, and this is seen when she tries to ignore her idea of her son having a clandestine relationship with Harriet.

Harriet Jameson is a very beautiful girl and is often very embarrassed by her mother. She is sweet and meek, very different from her mother. She is unaffected by her family's money and loves Harry for who he is, despite her mother's disapproval.

Grandma Cobb is the grandma in the Jameson family. Mrs. Jameson is her daughter. She is very sociable and spends the majority of her time visiting people throughout the day from house to house. She discloses all of the Jameson's business and often disagrees with her daughter's words and behaviors. She always dresses in black silk, which is regarded as one of the nicest things a woman could wear to those in Linnville. She also always carries peppermints and a mysterious novel that she never reads.

Harry Liscom is a church member and is seen as a handsome, brave young man in the community. He marries Harriett Jameson.

Jonas Martin is an old man who helps Mrs. Jameson plant the poison ivy around all of the houses in town. He receives some criticism for this, but defends himself by reminding people how hard it is to stand up against Mrs. Jameson.

Flora Clark is a prominent woman in Linnville. She is high-spirited and proud, as well as intelligent and pretty. Her only flaw is her bad temper and she is not afraid of anyone. As a result of her personality, Flora is not fond of Mrs. Jameson and is one of the few people in the novel who stands up to her when she refuses to read the literature that Mrs. Jameson wants her to at a sewing meeting.

Louisa Field is Sophia's brother's widowed wife. She has a daughter named Alice and is the head of the district school. She is very close to Sophia and always agrees with Sophia's thoughts of Mrs. Jameson.

Alice is Louisa's daughter and Sophia's young niece.

Cobb Jameson appears to be afraid of everything. We do not know if this is actually the case, or if his big blue eyes, parted mouth, and long curly hair just gives him this look of constant fear.

Mr. H. Boardman Jameson does not have a prominent role in the novel because he is always working in the city while the family summers in Linnville. He used to be very wealthy, but lost his money after his bank failed. He continued to be successful though after he obtained a job from a friend in a custom-house in New York City.

== Themes ==
One of the major underlying themes of the novel is the wide difference in lifestyles between upper and lower socio-economic classes, and the ideas that are instilled in people based on their wealth. The people in Linnville emphasize close relationships with other members of the community, and do not feel the need to accessorize their lives with unnecessary luxuries. They are willing to work hard to make a living, are unaffected by how well one dresses or how nice their home is, and enjoy socializing whether it is in a Sewing or Literature Club, or at town picnics. Mrs. Jameson, on the other hand, is more concerned with fashion, food, and beauty than the relationships she forms. While everyone in Linnville treats each other with respect and equality after years of friendship, Mrs. Jameson assumes power just because she is wealthier than the others in the community. She believes her money gives her the power to change a town she is new to, and that she can order people around. She expects them to assimilate to her ideal lifestyle, and will do whatever she can to get as close as possible to this goal. Mrs. Jameson thinks she and her family are better than the rest in every aspect of life, from fashion to interior design and education. In essence, one of the themes is that money gives people power to do whatever they wish and instills a sense of superiority in those who have a lot of it.

Another theme is the difference between city and country life in general. At the beginning of the novel, the people of Linnville find the Jameson's city apparel to be absurd, and even comment on how different their names are. Sophia says that the names Harriet and Sarah “seemed rather odd taste in these city people” (Wilkins page 37), and that in the country they prefer Hattie and Sadie. Mrs. Jameson attempts to corrupt the innocence and simplicity of Linnville by modernizing it and introducing customs from her wealthy, city life to its people. Due to even the subtle differences between city and country people, it is hard for the people of Linnville to get along with the Jameson's at first, and clearly it is difficult for Mrs. Jameson as well, or she would not try to make changes around town to satisfy her desires.

Another theme of the novel, also pertaining to socio-economic class and other differences between country and city life is reform. Throughout the novel Mrs. Jameson tries to reform the entire town by introducing her own customs. She tries to make the people eat the healthy foods she does, dress the way she does, educate them with formal literature she enjoys, and even tries to beautify the town itself. Instead of adapting to the town she is new to, Mrs. Jameson tries to change the town to accommodate her. In essence, the town of Linnville is unsophisticated and unaware of rural life and as a result, Mrs. Jameson single-handedly tries to completely reform the town into one of higher social standing through both its community and its visual appearance.

== Critical reception ==
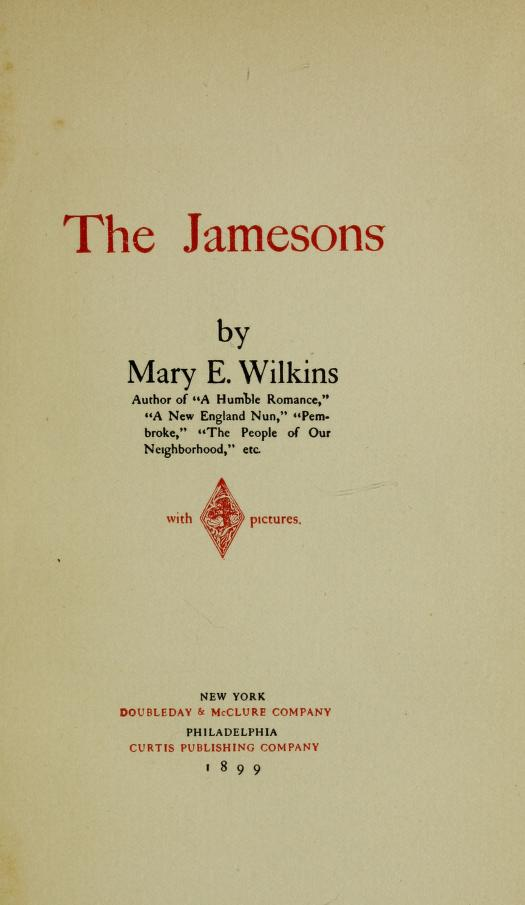
Title page from the first edition of The Jamesons, 1899

Although Mary E. Wilkins was considered "a prolific writer of short stories and novels", The Jamesons received little praise. According to one reviewer, "Any writer of experience could have produced it with little effort." A similar comment was made in The Ladies Home Journal that said the novel is "the drollest story ever written of a modern, up-to-date city woman in a village." Another critic in The Living Age also noted the lack of amusement in the novel and says, "Miss Wilkins looks at New England life from a more light and humorous standpoint than usual…the catastrophes that result are not too direful to be amusing." The most positive reviews of The Jamesons all mentioned the humor of the novel, just as the comment above. Another review from The Critic called the novel "quaintly humorous". A review in The New York Times praised the book as a "light read" that "occupies a niche of well-deserved respect in our minds. It contains no elaborate system of thought or economics. We are merely introduced to a few amiable housewives, chat a little, while upon the current topics of the village, and, with a thought here and there for each other’s health, disperse. Mary E. Wilkins has the patronage of busy people, for this book can be read in a couple of hours." Despite the criticism of The Jamesons as an overall boring novel, according to The Living Age, it was a "Book of the Month" in June 1899.

== Sales ==
According to The Bookmart on June 1, 1899, the May publication sales reached the average for the season and The Jamesons had a large first sale. When the article in The Bookmart was published, The Jamesons was 10th on a list of the 15 best selling books at the time. The novel sold for one dollar a copy. It was also noted in McClures Magazine that The Jamesons was a "specially successful recent book".
