= A New England Nun =

"A New England Nun and Other Stories"
- Short story by Mary Eleanor Wilkins Freeman
- First edition
- Country: United States
- Language: English

Publication
- Publisher: Harper & Brothers
- Media type: Print
- Publication date: 1891
- Pages: 328 pp

"A New England Nun" is a short story by Mary Eleanor Wilkins Freeman published in 1891.

== Plot summary ==
"A New England Nun" is the story of Louisa Ellis, a reclusive woman who has lived alone for many years. Louisa is set in her ways, she likes to keep her house meticulously clean, wear multiple aprons, and eat from her nicest china every day. She has an old dog named Caesar who she feels must be kept chained up because he bit a neighbor 14 years ago as a puppy. Louisa promised Joe Dagget 14 years ago that she would marry him when he returned from his fortune-hunting adventures in Australia, and now that he has returned it is time for her to fulfill her promise. When Joe arrives, however, it becomes obvious that Louisa sees him as a disruption of the life that she has made for herself. When Joe arrives on one of his twice weekly visits, Louisa attempts to have a conversation with him, but is distracted when he tracks dirt on the floor, re-arranges her books, and accidentally knocks things over. The two have a cool and slightly awkward conversation when Louisa inquires after Joe's mother's health and Joe blushes and tells Louisa that Lily Dyer has been taking care of her. Clearly, she is only planning on marrying Joe because she promised that she would, since it would mean that Louisa would have to give up the life that she has made for herself.

Three weeks later, a week before the wedding, as Louisa is enjoying a moonlit stroll, she happens to overhear a conversation between Joe and Lily. Through this conversation, Louisa learns that Joe and Lily have developed feelings for each other in the short time that Joe has been back, and that Joe is in love with Lily but refuses to break his promise to Louisa. Lily supports Joe's decision, and though Joe encourages her to find someone else, Lily says, "I'll never marry any other man as long as I live."

The next day, when Joe comes to visit, Louisa releases Joe from his promise without letting him know that she is aware of his relationship with Lily. Joe and Louisa then part tenderly, and Louisa is left alone to maintain her present lifestyle.

The last line of the story is: "Louisa sat, prayerfully numbering her days, like an uncloistered nun."

== Characters ==
=== Louisa Ellis ===
Louisa Ellis, the protagonist, lives in a quiet home in the New England countryside. Louisa is known for her cool sense and sweet, even temperament. Her world is her home, and everything from her aprons to her china has a use and purpose in her every day rhythm. She is engaged to Joe Dagget for fourteen years while he is off to Australia to make his fortune. However, after listening to Joe and Lily discuss their affection, she resolves to “keep her inheritance” and disengage herself from her long-standing engagement. In the end, she is content to spend her life as a spinster.

=== Joe Dagget ===
Joe Dagget is the fiancé of Louisa and beau to Lily Dyer. He is a man of great wealth for he traveled fourteen years to Australia for his fortune. He currently works his large farm to care for his mother and himself. Joe is described to walk around with “heavy step” and carries dust wherever he goes. After returning from Australia, he meets Lily and in the short months before his marriage to the protagonist, falls in love with her. After being released from his engagement, there is no real textual evidence that he and Lily marry, but his admiration for Louisa never changes.

=== Lily Dyer ===
Lily Dyer is the darling of Joe Dagget and his mother’s caretaker. Louisa describes her as "tall and full-figured, with a firm, fair face, her strong, yellow hair braided in a close knot". Her reputation among the village was praiseworthy. Her honor would not allow Joe to leave Louisa: "I've got good sense an' I ain't going to break my heart nor make a fool of myself; but I'm never going to be married, you can be sure of that. I ain't that sort of a girl to feel this way twice." While there is not a solid ending saying whether or not Joe and Lily wed, there is enough evidence to suggest they do. She is the better match for Joe with her sensibility and courage.

=== Caesar ===
Caesar is Louisa’s “veritable hermit of a dog.” For most of his life he resided in the small hut, which Louisa’s dead brother built for him, eating only corn-mush and cakes for food. The dog is not crucial to the plot, but brings insight into the internal affairs of the Ellis home. Just like the dog, Louisa has not permanently left the home in over 14 years, as he is chained up after biting a neighbor. Caesar is a foreshadowing for Louisa in his example of what will come of her if she should not marry. For example, there is no fear or sadness with the dog, but a simple acceptance of life as it passes before the front gate. The dog is also a warning for Joe, for the only reason he is allowed outside the limits of the land is to walk with his mistress as she leads him by a heavy chain.

== Analysis ==
"A New England Nun" falls within the genre of local color. A thorough focus on native scenery, dialog of the characters as native to the area, and displays of the values of a 19th-century New England landscape, are all contributing elements to that genre. The story is told from a third person viewpoint.

Another specific, structural feature includes Freeman's focus on nature. The piece begins with a brief but thorough description of the landscape surrounding the world of Ms. Louisa. "Somewhere in the distance the cows were lowing, and a little bell was tinkling; now and then a farm-wagon tilted by, and the dust flew; some blue-shirted laborers with shovels over their shoulders plodded past; little swarms of flies were dancing up and down before the peoples' faces in the soft air." Through this small scene the reader feels the presence of nature and the rhythm to which people and time march on in the New England landscape.

The emphasis of the countryside and the human's small part of nature also is very reminiscent of literature of the time period. Dr. Jesse S. Crisler, a scholar specializing in literary realism, notes in his class lectures that the opening and closing scenes of the piece are reminiscent of Thomas Gray's "Elegy Written in a Country Churchyard".

Unbeknownst to Louisa, the reason Joe will not disengage himself from her is because he would "break her lil’ heart". The same reason holds true for Louisa as the wedding day approaches. When both parties realize there is no affinity for one another, there are no arguments or fights but a simple conversation that leads to an honorable ending for both Louisa and Joe. Lily is also an example of honor as she declares, "Honor's honor, an' right's right. An' I'd never think anything of any man that went against ‘em for me or any other girl - you'd find that out, Joe Dagget." As a whole, the honor displayed in the story is an element of the local color of the New England area.

The title of "A New England Nun" captures several qualities of both nature and religious sentiments. The genre of local color is partially characterized by the landscape scenes. "There was a full moon that night. About nine o’clock Louisa strolled down the road a little way. There were harvest-fields on either hand, bordered by low stone walls. Luxuriant clumps of bushes grew beside the wall, and trees—wild cherry and old apple trees—at intervals. Presently Louisa sat down on the wall and looked about her with mildly sorrowful reflectiveness. Tall shrubs of blueberry and meadow-sweet, all woven together and tangled with blackberry vines and horsebriers, shut her in on either side." The emphasis is not on the impact nature has on the humans, nor the humans upon nature. Like a good ecosystem, both nature and humans are able to interact peacefully. However, in spite of the drama of the story, the ecosystem continues on in its natural rhythm.

The term "nun" implies several layers of complexity to the short story. There are a number of religious inferences to the text, which give the piece a feeling for the deep devotion of Louisa to her way of life. For example, "If Louisa Ellis had sold her birthright she did not know it, the taste of the pottage was so delicious, and had been her sole satisfaction for so long". This passage explains the opportunity for marrying had passed the protagonist and her "pottage" was the world she meticulously cared for. The passage expresses an awareness of the loss of a good opportunity, but the greater joy came from the "pottage" of the life she already knew. Another example: “Louisa sat, prayerfully numbering her days, like an uncloistered nun". The catholic notion of prayer accompanies the rosary and the numbering of prayers. Freeman uses this religious imagery to display the devotion-like rhythm Louisa accepts and loves.

== Adaptations ==
In 2001, the Radio Tales series presented an adaptation of the story on National Public Radio.
