= Complete Works (disambiguation) =

Complete works is a collection of all the works of one artist, writer, musician, group, etc.

Complete Works may also refer to:

- The Complete Works (Queen album), released in 1985
- The Complete Works (album series), a series of compilation albums by the band Spiritualized
- Complete Works (music), historical editions of published music in print, generally containing Classical music from a past repertory
- Complete Works (RSC festival), a festival set up by the Royal Shakespeare Company, running between April 2006 and March 2007
- Complete Works (web series), a series about a Shakespeare competition, aired on Hulu
- The Complete Works (poetry) (2007–2017), poetry mentoring scheme initiated by Bernardine Evaristo

== See also ==
- Collected works (disambiguation)
