= Collection (The Jam album) =

The Jam Collection

Compilation album by The Jam
- Released: 22 October 1996
- Genre: Rock
- Label: Polydor

The Jam chronology
Extras (1992)	The Jam Collection (1996)	Direction Reaction Creation (1997)

Professional ratings
Review scores
Source	Rating
AllMusic	2.5/5 stars
NME	(4/10)

Collection is a compilation by The Jam. It does not include any of the group's UK singles, focusing instead on album tracks and B-sides, although one track, "Just Who Is the 5 O'Clock Hero?", did make the UK singles chart as an import.

== Track listing ==
All tracks by Paul Weller.

1. "Away from the Numbers" – 4:02
2. "I Got By in Time" – 2:05
3. "I Need You (For Someone)" – 2:40
4. "To Be Someone (Didn't We Have a Nice Time)" – 2:28
5. "Mr. Clean" – 3:27
6. "English Rose" – 2:46
7. "In The Crowd" – 3:17
8. "It's Too Bad" – 2:34
9. "The Butterfly Collector" – 3:08
10. "Thick as Thieves" – 3:37
11. "Private Hell" – 3:46
12. "Wasteland" – 2:50
13. "Burning Sky" – 3:26
14. "Saturday's Kids" – 2:51
15. "Liza Radley" – 2:27
16. "Pretty Green" – 2:34
17. "Monday" – 2:57
18. "Man in the Corner Shop" – 3:11
19. "Boy About Town" – 1:55
20. "Tales from the Riverbank" – 3:32
21. "Ghosts" – 2:10
22. "Just Who Is the 5 O'Clock Hero?" – 2:13
23. "Carnation" – 3:24
24. "The Great Depression" – 2:51
25. "Shopping" – 3:23

== Personnel ==
- Vic Coppersmith-Heaven – Producer
- Douglas Brothers – Photography
- Derek d'Souza – Photography
- Simon Halfon – Design
- The Jam – Producer
- Dennis Munday – Compilation Producer, Research
- Chris Parry – Producer
- John Reed – Liner Notes
- Tony Taverner – Producer
- Roger Wake – Digital Remastering
- Pete Wilson – Producer
