= A Collection (Underworld album) =

Greatest hits album by Underworld
- Released: 4 December 2011
- Recorded: 1992–2011
- Genres: Techno; House; Trance; Electronica
- Label: underworldlive.com/Cooking Vinyl
- Producer: Rick Smith

Underworld chronology
1992–2012 The Anthology (2012)	A Collection (2011)	Barbara Barbara, We Face a Shining Future (2016)

Professional ratings
Aggregate scores
Source	Rating
Metacritic	67/100
Review scores
Source	Rating
AllMusic	4/5 stars
The New Zealand Herald	3.5/5 stars
PopMatters	8/10
Rolling Stone	3/5 stars

A Collection is a single-disc compilation album by Underworld, released on 4 December 2011 on underworldlive.com for digital download. A physical CD was released on 23 January 2012. At the same time, 1992-2012 The Anthology, a three disc compilation was also released.

No.	Title	Length
1.	"The First Note Is Silent (with High Contrast & Tiësto)"	3:39
2.	"Scribble"	3:48
3.	"Beebop Hurry (Karl Hyde and Brian Eno)"	3:08
4.	"Downpipe (with Mark Knight and D. Ramirez)"	3:20
5.	"Crocodile"	3:50
6.	"To Heal"	2:34
7.	"Two Months Off"	3:58
8.	"Jumbo"	4:06
9.	"Born Slippy .NUXX"	4:21
10.	"Dark & Long (Dark Train)"	6:14
11.	"Mmm Skyscraper I Love You"	7:45
12.	"Pearls Girl"	4:22
13.	"Cowgirl (Live)"	3:39
14.	"Rez"	5:59
15.	"King of Snake"	3:50
16.	"Moaner"	4:08
