= The Collector (serial killer) =

Unidentified Polish serial killer

Details
- Victims: 5
- Span of crimes: June – December 1994
- Country: Poland
- States: Lesser Poland, Podkarpackie

The Collector (Polish: Inkasent) is the nickname given to an unidentified serial killer who murdered at least five people in southern Poland between June and December 1994.

A suspect in the case, a former militiaman, was arrested, but acquitted of the murders, all of which remain unsolved.

== Murders ==
=== Modus operandi ===
The Collector's modus operandi was to pretend to enter the victims' homes under the pretext of reading their gas meters and issuing electricity bills – once inside the home, he would kill the occupants with a 6.35 caliber Walther PP converted to carry live ammunition. Afterwards, he would stay in the residence for some time, making sure to lock all of the doors before leaving the area.

The killer presumably traveled to the various areas via hitchhiking, and is suspected of possibly choosing to target homes that were architecturally similar to one another and were situated near the A4 autostrada. Alternatively, he may have chosen homes he believed to be occupied by single women, but this remains speculative.

=== Crimes ===
The Collector's first known crime took place on 17 June 1994, in the town of Łapczyca, Lesser Poland Voivodeship. On that date, he knocked on the door of a house occupied by a middle-aged woman, Lucyna Z., and her two young children. Initially, the door was opened by the older boy, 9-year-old Sebastian – upon seeing him, the man claimed that he made a mistake and promptly left. Sebastian would leave the house shortly after this encounter.

A few minutes after Sebastian left, the man returned to the house and knocked on the door again. He presented himself as the employee of the local power plant and claimed he was here to take the gas meter's readings. Due to the fact he appeared to be inconspicuous and that she was expecting somebody to come by soon, Lucyna allowed him to enter.

After checking the gas meter and writing information down on the electricity bills, the man pulled out a pistol and shot Lucyna several times in the head, killing her. He then turned the gun on her other son, 7-year-old Dominik, murdering him as well. The Collector then looked through the residence and stole several items – 2,000 Deutsche Mark, some small Polish banknotes and some gold jewelry. The bodies of the two victims were discovered hours later by Sebastian after he returned from school. Unable to enter the home due to the locked door, he grabbed a ladder and climbed through the balcony, where he soon found the bodies of his mother and younger brother. Sebastian then called the police and provided a detailed description of the supposed power plant employee, which led to the development of a facial composite.

Approximately five months later, on 24 November 1994, the Collector committed his second attack, this time in Pilzno, Podkarpackie Voivodeship. Again posing as a power plant employee, he knocked on the door of 60-year-old Maria J. and used his ruse to be allowed inside. Moments later, he shot and killed her, but instead of stealing valuables and leaving, he instead waited inside the house. After some time, her husband Józef returned home – upon entering, he was also shot and killed. The bodies were discovered after curious neighbors decided to check on the couple, as they still had their lights on during daytime. Similarly to the previous double murder, officers who arrived at the scene found electricity bills lying on a table next to the bodies.

The Collector's last known crime took place on 5 December, this time in the village of Morawica, again in Lesser Poland. After knocking on the door of 58-year-old woman Zofia K., he was allowed inside, where he shot and killed her. He then waited a few hours, possibly expecting somebody else to arrive home – unbeknownst to the man, the woman's son was about to enter the home, but noticed that the lights were on and assumed that his mother was inside, instead going to the nearby grocery store. When he returned, he found his mother's body in the kitchen, but by then, the killer had already left.

== Investigation ==
The murders caused a panic among the local residents, leaving many afraid to be left alone in their homes and calling the police on any person that was deemed suspicious. Due to the fact that he always introduced himself as a meter reader from the local power plant, the employees of the facility were forced to cease all field work for some time to avoid being misidentified as the killer.

In an attempt to catch the murderer, a special investigative team was formed in Kraków, along with a designated telephone line for potential tips about the case. The crimes were linked together due to fingerprints found at the murder sites.

== Suspect ==
According to witnesses, the man believed to be killer was described as aged between 30 and 35; around 170 to 175 cm tall, and with dark blond hair. Footprints secured at the crime scenes indicated that he wore size 46 shoes, and witnesses reported that the man always wore a hat with the Mercedes-Benz logo, possibly to conceal his identity or give himself additional credibility to potential victims. He was also noted for having a "lumbering" gait. Some locals reported that they had asked him what he was doing in the area, with the man replying that he was looking to buy several thousand chickens.

Criminal profilers suggested that due to his precision and carefulness, the Collector may have been associated with the uniformed services. It is also believed that he may have struggled emotionally (possibly in relationships with women) and suffered from some kind of personality disorder.

A concrete motive for the murders was never established, leading to heavy speculation. Some hypotheses initially suggested that the killer always intended to rob his victims' homes, but was interrupted in the later crimes. Others have suggested that the reason why he remained in the houses for hours on end was possibly to "admire his handiwork", indicating that he may have been a thrill killer.

=== Wojciech B. ===
A breakthrough in the case came in May 1996, when local police received a tip from an anonymous woman about a possible suspect - Wojciech B. from Katowice, a former member of the Milicja Obywatelska who now worked as a security guard and wore large-sized shoes. The evidence for his guilt was not extensive, as investigators relied primarily on witness testimony and odor analysis, but lacked concrete proof such as fingerprints. Wojciech was arrested in Szczecin while attempting to cross the border, and charged with the murders.

Wojciech B. stood trial for the crimes in December 1997. During the proceedings, it came to light that the scent evidence was poorly secured and that the witnesses' accounts were unreliable. The case against him was thrown into further disarray after he provided a solid alibi for one of the murders.

Two years later, in 1999, Wojciech B. was officially acquitted of all charges and released. He later sued the state for damages to his reputation and was financially compensated 84,000 złoty for his ordeal. Following his acquittal, Wojciech B. went on a pilgrimage to Licheń Stary, where he took a picture with a man who greatly resembled Zbigniew Gorszczyk, the prosecutor at his trial. While this had no impact on his appeals, it was used to point further point out that the facial composite of the suspect was too generic and could be mistaken for any random man walking on the streets. Gorszcyk and one of the Lucyna's husband appealed the verdict, but their appeal was rejected.

Years later, officers involved in the case admitted that they were pressured by higher-ups into making an arrest, leading to make many procedural errors that hampered the investigation.

To this day, the murders remain unsolved. It is unknown what happened to the Collector or why he suddenly stopped, with media outlets suggesting that he either moved away, was imprisoned for other crimes or has since died.

== See also ==
- List of serial killers by country
