= Collected Ghost Stories =

- Dust jacket illustration by Frank Utpatel for Collected Ghost Stories
- Author: Mary E. Wilkins Freeman
- Cover artist: Frank Utpatel
- Language: English
- Genre: Fantasy, Horror short stories
- Publisher: Arkham House
- Publication date: 1974
- Publication place: United States
- Media type: Print (hardback)
- Pages: xii, 189 pp
- ISBN: 0-87054-065-3

Collected Ghost Stories is a posthumous collection of stories by author Mary E. Wilkins Freeman (1852–1930). It was released in 1974 by Arkham House in an edition of 4,155 copies. The book is the first collection of all of Freeman's supernatural stories.

== Contents ==
Collected Ghost Stories contains the following tales:

1. "Introduction," by Edward Wagenknecht
2. "The Shadows on the Wall"
3. "The Hall Bedroom"
4. "Luella Miller"
5. "The Vacant Lot"
6. "A Far-Away Melody"
7. "A Symphony in Lavender"
8. "The Wind in the Rose-Bush"
9. "A Gentle Ghost"
10. "The Southwest Chamber"
11. "The Lost Ghost"
12. "The Jade Bracelet"
