= Laurent Pariente =

French sculptor (born 1962)

Laurent Pariente (born 4 May 1962 in Oran, French Algeria) is a French sculptor.

== Biography ==
One-man exhibitions

- 2006 – Musée Antoine Bourdelle, Paris. – Galerie Frank, Paris
- 2005 – Stellan Holm Gallery, New York
- 2004 – Galerie Frank, Paris.
- 2003 – « Quelques cabinets d’amateurs » Fonds régional d'art contemporain de Picardie, Amiens
- 2001 – Galerie Saint-Séverin, Paris.
- 2000 – Galerie Cent8, Paris.
- 1999 – Salle de Bains, alternative space, Lyon.
- 1998 – Galerie Cent8, Paris.
- 1997 – Le Creux de l'enfer, Centre d'art contemporain, Thiers.
- 1996 – The Henry Moore Institute, Leeds.
- 1993 – Galerie de l'Ancienne Poste, Le Channel, Calais.
- 1992 – Galerie Jean-François Dumont, Bordeaux.

Group exhibitions

- 2004 – « Non-lieu », Le Plateau, Fonds régional d'art contemporain d'Île-de-France, Paris.
- 2002 – Galerie Cent8 (with Peter Downsbrough), Paris. – Open Studio Exhibition, Tribeca Studio Program, New York
- 2000 – « Carpe Diem », École supérieure des beaux-arts, Nîmes. – « A tribute to Robert Hopper », Yorkshire Sculpture Park, Wakefield, England. – « Incursion/excursion », École supérieure des beaux-arts, Nîmes.
- 1999 – « Espace d'espèces », École supérieure des beaux-arts, Nîmes.
- 1998 – « Habiter l'œuvre », galerie de l'École des beaux-arts, Quimper.
- 1998 – « Printemps français », Espace de l'art concret, Mouans-Sartoux.
- 1997 – « La rayure, l'intervalle, le jour..., » Fonds régional d'art contemporain du Nord-Pas-de-Calais, Dunkerque.
- 1996 – « Container 96 » – Art Across the Oceans, Copenhagen.
- 1993 – « Comme rien d'autre que des rencontres », Muhka, Antwerp.
- 1991 – « L'amour de l'art », biennale d'art contemporain, Lyon.
- 1990 – Galerie Jean-François Dumont, Bordeaux.
- 1989 – Landreville, Bar-sur-Seine (Champagne-Ardennes)
- 1988 – Pavillon Lescure, Artigues-prés-Bordeaux.
- 1987 – Château des ducs d'Épernon, Cadillac (Gironde)
- 1986 – La Serre, galerie de l'École des beaux-arts, Saint-Étienne. – Espace du Bateau-Lavoir, Paris.

Set designs

- 2004 – « Croisées », Sui-generis, Emmanuelle Vo-Dinh dance company, Saint-Brieuc.
- 2003 – « Sagen », Sui-generis, Emmanuelle Vo-Dinh dance company, Saint-Brieuc.

Architectural projects

- 2005-2006 – Design of a waste sorting center in Rouen (private commission), renovation of the Museum of Fine Arts of Dijon (competition), renovation of the FRAC Orléans (competition) in collaboration with Jacques Moussafir, Architects Associates
- 1996 – Le Panetier, industrial building for Lefranc Company, Saint-Martin-Boulogne. Collaborating architect : Frédérik Dain

Public art commissions

- 2003 – Design of the offices of the museum of modern art of Luxembourg (study)
- 2002 – 1% Culturel, Centre dramatique de Tours (study)
- 2000 – Artwork for the tramway of the city of Orléans.
- 1999 – New design of the choir and altar, ambo, bishop's chair and seats for celebrants, cathedral of Vannes, Brittany (under realization).

Unrealised projects

- 1997 – project (drawings and models) for the extension of a private house, Calais (private commission)
- 1993 – First project of two (plasterboards, soap, clay), drawings, models, plans, Galerie de l'Ancienne Poste, Le Channel, Calais.
- 1993 – Project for an exhibition (drawings and models) Villa Arson, Centre national d'art contemporain, Nice.

Public collections

- 2004 – Fonds régional d'art contemporain de Picardie, Amiens.
- 2002 – Fonds régional d'art contemporain de Picardie, Amiens.
- 1999 – Caisse des dépôts et consignations, Paris (Dépôts et Consignations, Paris, loaned to Fonds régional d'art contemporain du Centre, Orléans)
- 1998 – Fonds national d'art contemporain, Paris.
- 1997 – Fonds régional d'art contemporain d'Aquitaine, Bordeaux.
- 1991 – Musée d'Art contemporain, Lyon.

== Bibliography ==
Statements and interviews

- "Laurent Pariente" Interview with Antoine de Roux, DVD, Pal, 17mn, Paris, Double Eléphant, 2006
- "Laurent Pariente, Untitled", in catalogue L'Amour de l'art, biennale d'art contemporain de Lyon, Lyon, musée d'Art contemporain, 1991.
- "Laurent Pariente : entretien avec Marie-Thérèse Champesme", in Art Présence, nº6, Pléneuf-Val-André, septembre-octobre 1993.
- "Habiter l'oeuvre – entretien avec Laurent Pariente", special review supervised by Jean-Paul Robert, English translation Ronald Corlette Theuil, in L'architecture d'aujourd'hui, nº311, Paris, juin 1997.
- "Laurent Pariente. L'expérience du vide ou le lieu de l'intermédiaire". Dialogue avec Frédéric Bouglé, in Art Présence, nº25, Paris, janvier-février-mars 1998.

Monographs

- Laurent Pariente, Paris, Musée Bourdelle, 2006 (144 pages, bilingual)
- Laurent Pariente, Leeds, The Henry Moore Institute, 1996 (92 pages, bilingual)
- Laurent Pariente, Œuvres / Works, 1986–2000, Tel Aviv, 2000 (366 pages, bilingual)

Films

- “Laurent Pariente” Interview with Antoine de Roux, DVD, Pal, 17mn, Paris, Double Eléphant, 2006
- “Laurent Pariente, à travers les murs” by Antoine de Roux, DVD, Pal, 96mn, Double Eléphant, Paris, 2006

Group exhibitions' catalogues

- Bordeaux – Saint-Étienne, Saint-Étienne, La Serre, galerie de l’École des beaux-arts, 1986
- L’Ironie, Cadillac (Gironde), château des ducs d’Épernon, 1987.
- Landreville 1989, Bar-sur-Seine, Maison pour tous de Landreville, 1989.
- L’Amour de l’art, biennale d’art contemporain, Lyon, musée d’Art contemporain, 1991.
- Comme rien d’autre que des rencontres, Antwerp, Museum van Hedendaagse Kunst, 1994.
- Collection 1992, musée d’Art contemporain, Lyon, 1995.
- Container 96 – Art Across the Oceans, Copenhagen, 1996.
- Produire, créer, collectionner, collection de la Caisse des dépôts et consignations, Paris, Hazan, 1998.
- Non-lieu, Le Plateau, Fonds régional d'art contemporain d'Île-de-France, La lettre volée, Paris, 2004.
- 1990-2003, Prototypes, Œuvres et expositions du Fonds régional d’art contemporain de Picardie, Frac Picardie Amiens, 2004.

Special reviews in magazines

- Bruno Lopez, “Laurent Pariente à la galerie Frank”, in Sortir, France3 TV show, Paris, Oct. 2004.
- Jean-Paul Robert, "Laurent Pariente", in L’Architecture d’aujourd’hui, n° 311, Paris, juin 1997, p. 61-79.
- Frédéric Bouglé, "Laurent Pariente", in Art Présence, n° 25, Pléneuf-Val-André (Bretagne), janvier-mars 1998, p. 5-17.
- Andrew Mead, "Laurent Pariente’s Space Journey", in The Architects’ Journal, London, September 16, 1999, n° 10, vol. 210, p. 32-36.

Essays on Laurent Pariente’s work

- Christian Besson, "The Wall, the Limit, the Neuter", in Laurent Pariente, Œuvres / Works, 1986–2000, Tel Aviv, 2000.
- Marie-Ange Brayer, "Laurent Pariente", in catalogue Produire, créer, collectionner, collection de la Caisse des dépôts et consignations, Paris, Hazan, 1998.
- Alain Charre, "The art of recalling, the work of oblivion", in catalogue Non-lieu, Le Plateau, Fonds régional d'art contemporain d'Île-de-France, La lettre Volée, Paris, 2004.
- Idem, "White Iconoclasm" in Laurent Pariente, Paris, Musée Bourdelle, 2006.
- Idem, « Un silence d’images miroirs transparents », in Laurent Pariente, à travers les murs, documentary film by Antoine de Roux, 1h16mn, Double éléphant, Paris, 2006.
- Eric Corne, "Intensities", in catalogue Non-lieu, Le Plateau, Fonds régional d'art contemporain d'Île-de-France, La lettre Volée, Paris, 2004.
- René Denizot, "Fugue or the necessity of art", in catalogue Laurent Pariente, Leeds, The Henry Moore Institute, 1996.
- Idem, “Encounter”, in Laurent Pariente, Œuvres / Works, 1986–2000, Tel Aviv, 2000.
- Idem, "Stepping...", in Laurent Pariente, Œuvres / Works, 1986–2000, Tel Aviv, 2000.
- Idem, « Au bord, peut-être », in Laurent Pariente, à travers les murs, documentary film by Antoine de Roux, 1h16mn, Double éléphant, Paris, 2006.
- Jean-François Dumont, "Something that Shone, or the Initial Perfection", in ibid.
- Mo Gourmelon, "L’attracteur étrange", in écrits sur l’art contemporain, éditions Espace Croisé, Roubaix, 2004.
- Emmanuel Hocquard, English translation by Cole Swensen, in Laurent Pariente, Paris, Musée Bourdelle, 2006.
- Juliette Laffon, foreword of the catalogue in Laurent Pariente, Paris, Musée Bourdelle, 2006.
- Guitemie Maldonado, "l'art dans le paysage du tramway d'Orléans", éditions de la réunion des musées nationaux, 2002.
- idem, « séduction de l’architecture » presse release, galerie Frank, Paris, 2004
- idem, "Deviations and disorientations in the constructions of Laurent Pariente" in Laurent Pariente, Paris, Musée Bourdelle, 2006.
- Cole Swensen, Laurent Pariente, à travers les murs, documentary film by Antoine de Roux, 1h16mn, Double éléphant, Paris, 2006.
- Christiane Vollaire, "The Geometer’s Betrayal", in Laurent Pariente, Œuvres / Works, 1986–2000, Tel Aviv, 2000.
- Christian Besson, "Le mur, la limite, le neutre", English translation Charles Penwarden, "The Wall, the Limit, the Neuter", in Laurent Pariente, Œuvres / Works, 1986–2000, Tel Aviv, 2000.
- Marie-Ange Brayer, "Laurent Pariente", in catalogue Produire, créer, collectionner, collection de la Caisse des dépôts et consignations, Paris, Hazan, 1998.

Other writings

- Anonymous, "Labyrinth", in ARCH+, n° 138, Paris, octobre 1997.
- Anonymous, "Laurent Pariente", in Beaux-Arts, n° 197, Paris, octobre 2000.
- Anonymous, "Laurent Pariente", https://web.archive.org/web/20070708035100/http://n.s.art.free.fr/, Paris, octobre 2000.
- Anonymous, « Non Lieu », in Télérama, Paris, 28 avril-4 mai 2004.
- Anonymous, « Non Lieu », in Le Moniteur, n°142, Paris, avril 2004.
- Anonymous, « Non Lieu au Plateau », Paris, avril/mai 2004.
- Anonymous, « Se perdre », in Mouvement, Paris, mai-juin 2004.
- Dominique Arnal, "Le Panetier de la compagnie Lefranc", in La Voix du Nord, Calais, 29-30, décembre 1996.
- Jean Attali, « Laurent Pariente et le principe de revêtement ", in Techniques et architecture, n° 438, Paris, juin 1998.
- Didier Arnaudet, "Un vœu insolite de simplification", in Gironde Magazine, Bordeaux, n° 28, mars-juin 1992.
- Idem, "Pariente entre quatre murs", in Beaux-Arts magazine, Paris, n° 100, avril 1992.
- Idem, "Laurent Pariente, galerie Jean-François Dumont", in Art Press, Paris, n° 169, mai 1992.
- Idem, "Laurent Pariente, galerie de l’Ancienne Poste", in Art Press, Paris, n° 187, janvier 1994.
- Idem, "Laurent Pariente, la perfection d’une énigme", in Artefactum, Antwerp, vol. 11, n° 52, July–August 1994.
- Idem, "Laurent Pariente, The Henry Moore Institute", in Art Press, Paris, n° 216, septembre 1996.
- Idem, "Ouvrir le mur", L’Architecture d’aujourd’hui, in Paris, n° 311, juin 1997.
- Idem, "Laurent Pariente, galerie Cent8", in Art Press, Paris, n° 240, novembre 1998.
- M. & m’ Balau, "Laurent Pariente : faces et détours", in Architecture A +, Brussels, n° 128, June–July 1994.
- Laurent Boudier, "Laurent Pariente", in Télérama, Paris, n° 302, septembre 1998.
- Denis-Laurent Bouyer, "Voir n’est pas comprendre", Sans titre, Lille, n° 44, octobre-novembre 1998.
- Valérie Breuvart, "Laurent Pariente, galerie Cent8", in Art Forum, New York, January 1999.
- Robert Clark, "Laurent Pariente", in Guardian, London, July 10, 1996.
- Marie-Pierre Demarty, "De Dietman à Pariente", in Nord littoral, Calais, 20 août 1993.
- Idem, "Le chemin de la sérénité", in Nord littoral, Calais, octobre 1993.
- René Denizot, "Laurent Pariente", in Galeries Magazine, Paris, n° 57, décembre 1993-janvier 1994.
- Idem, « traversée du désert », in papiers-libres, Paris, avril/mai/juin 2004.
- Jean-François Dumont, "Art et architecture", in Le Festin, Bordeaux, n° 21, 1997.
- Idem, "Laurent Pariente", typewritten text, Centre d’art contemporain, Le Creux de l’Enfer, Thiers, 1998.
- Manou Farine, « Espaces mentaux, in L’œil, Paris, n°558, mai 2004.
- Manou Farine and Benedicte Ramade, "Laurent Pariente : Détour Architecturaux", in L’œil, Paris, n°557, avril 2004, p21.
- Idem, « Laurent Pariente » : in http://www.franceculture.com
- Ingeborg Flagge, "Installation in Weiß", in Jahrbuch Licht und Architektur 2000, Köln, November 1999, p. 100-104.
- Elias Guenoun, "l’exposition comme paysage en suspension", in d’A, Paris, n° 138, juin/juillet 2004, p14-15.
- Benoit Grafteaux, "Laurent Pariente : L’art du béton brut", in Sans titre, Lille, n° 37, 1996.
- Lèa Gourévitch, "La craie à fleur de peau", urbuz.com, Paris, octobre 2000.
- Philippe Grand, "Laurent Pariente", Collection 1992, in Lyon, musée d’Art contemporain, 1994.
- Robert Hopper, "Industrial character", in The Architects’ Journal, London, n° 16, October 1998.
- Jean-Michel Hoyet, "Laurent Pariente", in Techniques et architecture, Paris, n° 427, août-septembre 1996.
- Elisabeth Lebovici, « Non Lieu en chantier », in Libération, Paris, 26 avril 2004.
- Emmanuelle Lequeux, "Laurent Pariente", in Aden, supplement of Le Monde, Paris, du 27 septembre au 3 octobre 2000.
- Idem, "Non-lieu", in Aden, supplement of Le Monde, Paris, du 31 mars au 6 avril, 2004.
- Jade Lindgaard, "Pariente le planificateur", in Aden, supplement of, Le Monde, Paris, 23-29.
- O.M. « Aménagements concertés », in le journal des arts, Paris, 16-29 avril 2004, septembre 1998.
- Cyrille Maury, "La plaque de plâtre au service de l’art", in B.P.B. Magazine, Paris, n° 14, octobre 1996.
- Idem, "Laurent Pariente au Creux de l’Enfer", in B.P.B. Magazine, Paris, n° 17, juin 1998.
- Idem, "Les promenades de Laurent Pariente", in Plâtre information, n° 39, juin 1998.
- Andrew Mead, "Laurent Pariente", in The Architects’ Journal, London, n° 22, June 1996.
- Idem, "Laurent Pariente’s Space Journey", in The Architects’ Journal, London, 16 September 1999, n° 10, vol. 210, p. 32-36.
- Catherine Pierre, "Labyrinthe de plâtre", in amc le moniteur architecture, Paris, n° 73, septembre 1996.
- Idem, "Bâtiment industriel", in amc le moniteur architecture, Paris, n° 79, avril 1997.
- Olivier Reneau, "Calme blanc", in Technikart, Paris, n° 19, février 1998.
- Idem, "De la craie plein les doigts", in Technikart, Paris, n° 26, octobre 1998.
- Pierre Saurisse, "Labyrinthes lumineux", in Beaux-Arts magazine, Paris, n° 173, octobre 1998.
- Gérard Sendrey, "Grasseau, Mouillé, Pariente", in Artension, Rouen, n° 3, avril 1988.
- Julia Schulz-Dornburg, "Arte y arquitectura : nuevas afinidades, Art and architecture : new affinities", in Editorial Gustavo Gili, SA, Barcelona, 2000, p. 130.
- Jonas Tophoven, "Voyage au Creux de l’Enfer", in Intérieur Systèmes, Paris, n° 16, février 1998.
- Sandre Vanbremeersch, « Non Lieu », in https://www.paris-art.com
- Jean Vermeil, "La pure épure", in D’Architectures, Paris, n° 66, juillet 1996.
- Maurizzio Vitta, "Les labyrinthes de Pariente", in Arca International, Paris, juillet 1996.

Special reviews

- Mead, Andrew. "Investigating space and surfaces.(appreciation of the work of French-born architect Laurent Pariente)." Architects' Journal 210.10 (Sept 16, 1999): 32(5)Expanded Academic ASAP. Thomson Gale. TORONTO PUBLIC LIBRARIES (CELPLO). 3 Nov. 2006 http://find.galenet.com/ips/infomark.do&contentSet=IACDocuments&type=retrieve&tabID=T003&prodId=IPS&docId=A55905869&source=gale&srcprod=EAIM&userGroupName=tplmain&version=1.0

"French-born architect Laurent Pariente is known for use of space, light and colour. Pariente is an artist who combines the skills of art and architecture to create startling pieces of work. One of his most well-known interests lie in the art of labyrinth or maze designing, and he was commissioned to design a new building for French firm Compagnie Lefranc, which was based on the theme of a labyrinth."
