= Collected Poems =

Among the numerous literary works titled Collected Poems are the following:

- Collected Poems (Achebe) by Chinua Achebe
- Collected Poems (Berry) by Wendell Berry
- Collected Poems (Boyle) by Kay Boyle
- Collected Poems (Browning) by Robert Browning
- Collected Poems (Caudwell) by Christopher Caudwell
- Collected Poems of Robert Frost
- Collected Poems (Goodman) by Paul Goodman
- Collected Poems (Hardy) by Thomas Hardy
- Collected Poems (Hughes) by Ted Hughes
- Collected Poems (Larkin) by Philip Larkin
- Collected Poems (Levi) by Primo Levi
- Collected Poems (Lovecraft) by H. P. Lovecraft
- Collected Poems (MacDiarmid) by Hugh MacDiarmid
- Collected Poems (Moore) by Marianne Moore
- Collected Poems (Neilson) by Shaw Neilson
- The Collected Poems (Plath) by Sylvia Plath
- Collected Poems (Stevens) by Wallace Stevens
- Collected Poems (Tierney) by Richard L. Tierney
- The Collected Poems of J.R.R. Tolkien

== See also ==
- Collected works (disambiguation)
- List of poetry collections
- Selected Poems (disambiguation)
