= Tom Robinson discography =

- Studio albums: 14
- EPs: 3
- Live albums: 7
- Compilation albums: 11
- Singles: 33
- Video albums: 2
- Other albums: 13

This is the discography of British singer-songwriter Tom Robinson. He has released one studio album as part of Café Society, two as part of the Tom Robinson Band, one as part of Sector 27, one as part of Faith, Folk and Anarchy, one with King Crimson lead singer Jakko Jakszyk and eight solo albums. He has also released fan club-only bootlegs known as the Castaway Club series.

== Albums ==
=== Studio albums ===
Title	Album details	Peak chart positions						
Title	Album details	UK	UK Indie	AUS	FIN	NOR	SWE	US
Café Society (as Café Society)	Released: October 1975; Label: Konk; Formats: LP	—	—	—	—	—	—	—
Power in the Darkness (as Tom Robinson Band)	Released: 19 May 1978; Label: EMI, Harvest; Formats: LP, 2xLP, MC, 8-track	4	—	52	5	4	5	144
TRB Two (as Tom Robinson Band)	Released: 16 March 1979; Label: EMI, Harvest; Formats: LP, MC, 8-track	18	—	—	25	8	17	163
Sector 27 (as Sector 27)	Released: 7 November 1980; Label: Fontana; Formats: LP, MC	—	—	—	—	—	—	—
North by Northwest	Released: May 1982; Label: Panic, I.R.S.; Formats: LP, MC	—	—	—	—	—	—	—
Hope and Glory	Released: September 1984; Label: Castaway, Geffen; Formats: LP, MC	21	—	—	—	—	—	—
Still Loving You	Released: September 1986; Label: Castaway; Formats: CD, LP, MC	—	—	—	—	—	—	—
We Never Had It So Good (with Jakko Jakszyk)	Released: 1990; Label: Musidisc; Formats: CD, LP, MC	—	—	—	—	—	—	—
Living in a Boom Time	Released: 14 September 1992; Label: Cooking Vinyl; Formats: CD, MC	—	—	—	—	—	—	—
Love over Rage	Released: 2 May 1994; Label: Cooking Vinyl; Formats: CD, MC	—	—	—	—	—	—	—
Having It Both Ways	Released: 27 May 1996; Label: Cooking Vinyl; Formats: CD, MC	—	—	—	—	—	—	—
Smelling Dogs	Released: 11 September 2001; Label: Castaway Northwest; Formats: CD; Spoken word album; US-only release	—	—	—	—	—	—	—
Faith, Folk and Anarchy (as Faith, Folk and Anarchy)	Released: January 2002; Label: Hands On Music; Formats: CD	—	—	—	—	—	—	—
Only the Now	Released: 16 October 2015; Label: Castaway Northwest; Formats: CD, LP, digital download	—	20	—	—	—	—	—
"—" denotes releases that did not chart or were not released in that territory.

=== Live albums ===
Title	Album details
Cabaret ‘79	Released: October 1982; Label: Panic; Formats: LP
Live – Midnight at the Fringe	Released: March 1987; Label: Dojo; Formats: CD, LP
Blond & Blue	Released: 1988; Label: RCA; Formats: LP, MC; Italy-only release; Features tracks from Live – Midnight at the Fringe
The Winter of 1992 (as Tom Robinson Band)	Released: 1992; Label: Castle Communications; Formats: CD
Holidays in the Sun	Released: 23 July 1998; Label: Victor; Formats: CD; Japan-only release
Faith, Folk and Anarchy Live (as Faith, Folk and Anarchy, with Martyn Joseph and Steve Knightley)	Released: 2004; Label: Pipe; Formats: 2xCD
Power in the Darkness – Live at the 100 Club	Released: 21 September 2018; Label: The state51 Conspiracy; Formats: CD, LP, digital download

=== Compilation albums ===
Title	Album details
Tom Robinson Band (as Tom Robinson Band)	Released: 1981; Label: EMI; Formats: LP, MC
The Collection 1977–'87	Released: November 1987; Label: EMI; Formats: CD, LP, MC
Last Tango	Released: 1989; Label: Line; Formats: CD, LP; Germany-only release
Tom Robinson	Released: 1994; Label: Pop Fire; Formats: CD
The Gold Collection	Released: March 1996; Label: EMI; Formats: CD
Sector 27 Complete (as Section 27)	Released: June 1996; Label: Fontana; Formats: CD, MC
Rising Free – The Very Best of TRB (as Tom Robinson Band)	Released: June 1997; Label: EMI; Formats: CD
The Undiscovered	Released: April 1998; Label: Recall 2cd; Formats: 2xCD
The Cafe Society Archives (as Café Society)	Released: 1999; Label: Secret Society; Formats: CD
War Baby	Released: 24 November 2000; Label: Armoury; Formats: CD; Germany-only release
The Anthology 1977–79 (as Tom Robinson Band)	Released: 28 June 2013; Label: EMI; Formats: 3xCD+DVD, digital download

=== Video albums ===
Title	Album details
Back in the Old Country	Released: 1986; Label: Channel 5; Formats: VHS
Tom Robinson Band (as Tom Robinson Band)	Released: 2003; Label: Magna Pacific; Formats: DVD; Australia-only release

=== Other albums ===
Title	Album details
The T.R.B. Pre-Album	Released: February 1978; Label: Harvest; Formats: 12"; US promo-only mini-album
Castaway Club Vol 1	Released: 1994; Label: Self-released; Formats: CD; Fan club-only release
Castaway Club Vol 2	Released: 1995; Label: Self-released; Formats: CD; Fan club-only release
Castaway Club Vol 3	Released: 1996; Label: Self-released; Formats: CD; Fan club-only release; Features demos from Section 27
Castaway Club Vol 4	Released: 1997; Label: Self-released; Formats: CD; Fan club-only release
Live at Abbey Road – Castaway Club Vol 5	Released: 1998; Label: Self-released; Formats: CD; Fan club-only release
Castaway Club Vol 6	Released: 1999; Label: Self-released; Formats: CD; Fan club-only release
Home from Home	Released: February 1999; Label: Oyster; Formats: 2xCD; Belgium-only release; First CD features songs recorded in Belgium; the second is the same as the Japanese Holidays in the Sun album
Castaway Club Vol 7	Released: 2000; Label: Self-released; Formats: CD; Fan club-only release
Castaway Club Vol 8	Released: 2001; Label: Self-released; Formats: CD; Fan club-only release; Commercially released as Smelling Dogs
Castaway Club Vol 9	Released: 2002; Label: Self-released; Formats: CD; Fan club-only release
Castaway Club Vol 10	Released: 2003; Label: Self-released; Formats: CD; Fan club-only release
Castaway CD 60	Released: 2010; Label: Self-released; Formats: CD; Exclusive limited release

== EPs ==
Title	Album details	Peak chart positions		
Title	Album details	UK	FIN	SWE
Rising Free... ("Don't Take No for an Answer"/"Sing If You're Glad to Be Gay")	Released: January 1978; Label: EMI; Formats: 7"	18	24	15
Atmospherics	Released: 1982; Label: Panic; Formats: 12"	—	—	—
Feel So Good (with Kiki Dee)	Released: January 1987; Label: Castaway; Formats: 7", 12"	93	—	—
"—" denotes releases that did not chart or were not released in that territory.

== Singles ==
Title	Year	Peak chart positions										Album
Title	Year	UK	UK Indie	AUS	BE (FL)	FIN	IRE	NL	NOR	NZ	SWE	Album
"(The) Whitby Two-Step" (as Café Society)	1975	—	—	—	—	—	—	—	—	—	—	Café Society
"2-4-6-8 Motorway" (as Tom Robinson Band)	1977	5	—	13	28	3	14	37 (Note: "2-4-6-8 Motorway" didn't enter the Dutch Single Top 30, but did peak at number 9 on the Single Tip chart and number 28 on the Dutch Top 40.)	6	36	1	Non-album singles
"Right On Sister" (as Tom Robinson Band; US and Canada-only release)	1978	—	—	—	—	—	—	—	—	—	—	Non-album singles
"Up Against the Wall" (as Tom Robinson Band)	1978	33	—	—	—	—	—	—	—	—	16	Power in the Darkness
"Too Good to Be True" (as Tom Robinson Band)	1978	—	—	—	—	—	—	—	—	—	—	Power in the Darkness
"Black Angel" (as Tom Robinson Band; Japan-only release)	1979	—	—	—	—	—	—	—	—	—	—	TRB Two
"Bully for You" (as Tom Robinson Band)	1979	68	—	—	—	—	—	—	—	—	—	TRB Two
"Alright All Night" (as Tom Robinson Band)	1979	—	—	—	—	—	—	—	—	—	—	TRB Two
"Never Gonna Fall in Love (Again)" (with the Voice Squad)	1979	—	—	99	—	—	—	—	—	—	—	Non-album single
"Not Ready" (as Sector 27)	1980	—	4	—	—	—	—	—	—	—	—	Sector 27
"Invitation: What Have We Got to Lose?" (as Sector 27)	1980	—	—	—	—	—	—	—	—	—	—	Sector 27
"Total Recall" (as Sector 27)	1981	—	—	—	—	—	—	—	—	—	—	Sector 27
"Martin's Gone" (as Sector 27)	1981	—	—	—	—	—	—	—	—	—	—	Non-album singles
"Tango an der Wand" (Germany-only release)	1981	—	—	—	—	—	—	—	—	—	—	Non-album singles
"Now Martin's Gone"	1982	—	—	—	—	—	—	—	—	—	—	North by Northwest
"Stand Together" (Germany-only release)	1982	—	—	—	—	—	—	—	—	—	—	Cabaret '79
"War Baby"	1983	6	1	73	—	—	16	—	—	—	—	Hope and Glory
"Listen to the Radio (Atmospherics)"	1983	39	4	—	6	—	—	3	—	—	—	Hope and Glory
"Back in the Old Country"	1984	79	—	—	—	—	—	—	—	—	—	Non-album single
"Rikki Don't Lose That Number"	1984	58	—	—	—	—	—	—	—	—	—	Hope and Glory
"Prison"	1985	—	—	—	—	—	—	—	—	—	—	Hope and Glory
"(It Ain't Nothing Like) The Real Thing"	1986	—	—	—	—	—	—	—	—	—	—	Still Loving You
"Still Loving You"	1986	88	—	—	—	—	—	—	—	—	—	Still Loving You
"Spain"	1987	—	—	—	—	—	—	—	—	—	—	Still Loving You
"Hard Cases"	1988	—	—	—	—	—	—	—	—	—	—	Non-album single
"Blood Brother" (with Jakko Jakszyk)	1990	—	—	—	—	—	—	—	—	—	—	We Never Had It So Good
"War Baby" (re-recording)	1992	—	—	133	—	—	—	—	—	—	—	Living in a Boom Time
"Hard"	1994	—	—	—	—	—	—	43	—	—	—	Love Over Rage
"Loved"	1994	—	—	—	—	—	—	—	—	—	—	Love Over Rage
"Days (That Changed the World)"	1994	—	—	—	—	—	—	—	—	—	—	Love Over Rage
"Thin Green Line" (with TV Smith)	1995	—	—	—	—	—	—	—	—	—	—	Immortal Rich (by TV Smith)
"Connecticut"/"Disrespect"	1996	—	—	—	—	—	—	—	—	—	—	Having It Both Ways
"The Mighty Sword of Justice" (promo-only release)	2015	—	—	—	—	—	—	—	—	—	—	Only the Now
"One Big Con" (as the Gaslight Troubadours featuring Tom Robinson)	2018	—	—	—	—	—	—	—	—	—	—	Stranger Swings (by the Gaslight Troubadours)
"—" denotes releases that did not chart or were not released in that territory.
