= Masterswitch =

English rock band

Masterswitch was an English rock band active in the late 1970s.

== Band members ==
The band consisted of four members:

- Jimmy Edwards (vocals, guitar)
- Stephen Wilkin (guitar)
- Mark Steed (bass guitar)
- Martin Lee (drums)

== Formation (1976) ==
Lifelong friends Ray Simone and Martin Lee, together with Dave Sumeray (who was the bass player with Simone and Lee in a band called Woodfog) placed an advert in Melody Maker in an attempt to recruit bandmates at an open audition. Enthusiastic musicians queued patiently waiting their turn to prove their worth; ultimately Edwards' natural vocal flair, Wilkin's 'Wilkey Fingers' and, after Dave Sumeray decided to quit the band and the music business, Steed's conquering bass prevailed to form Masterswitch.

== 1976–1978 ==
In 1977, the band signed to the Epic record company and in the following year released their only studio release Action Replay/Mass Media Meditation. Despite talent and the intelligent social commentary (notably That's Light Entertainment), Masterswitch only picked up a small cult following playing regularly at the Marquee Club in Soho, London. With The Clash grabbing all attention of Epic's marketing combined with poor management, Masterswitch split in 1978.

Jimmy Edwards and Stephen Wilkin went to record as Jimmy and The Profiles and later Edwards and Ray Simone went on to form Time UK with former The Jam drummer Rick Buckler. After three singles they split, although Jimmy and Buckler formed the short-lived band Sharp with Buckler's ex-Jam bandmate Bruce Foxton.

== 2007–date ==
Ray Simone, Martin Lee and Dave Sumeray reunited as Woodfog. After a 34-year break, they worked on some new songs and renamed themselves as The Creatures of Habit. Following a lengthy period of illness, Ray Simone died on 18 June 2012. In 2013, following Simone's death, Lee and Sumeray decided to resurrect Woodfog. They recruited Paul Squires on drums. Edwards died in January 2015.

Dave Sumeray and Mart Lee as Creatures of Habit released Where Have All The Years Gone? Squires has since left The Creatures of Habit and they have recruited a new drummer, Monzur Rahman.
