= Café Society (British band) =

British rock band (1973–1976)

- Origin: London
- Genres: Folk-rock, pub rock
- Years active: 1973–1976
- Label: Konk
- Past members: Tom Robinson; Hereward Kaye; Raphael "Ray" Doyle; Nick South; Nick Travisick

Café Society were a British band who were active in the mid-1970s. Based on the trio of Tom Robinson, Hereward Kaye and Raphael "Ray" Doyle, they recorded one self-titled album on the Konk record label, produced by Ray Davies of the Kinks.

== History ==
The band came together in London in 1973, although the three original members had known each other for several years, first meeting in Kaye's home town of Middlesbrough. They all sang, played guitar, and wrote songs. When living in London, they began performing together in a folk rock style as "Hereward & Friends" at clubs including Bunjies, and were mentored by Alexis Korner. After adopting their new name of Café Society, they won a residency at the Troubadour Club where they were heard by Ray Davies. He signed them to his record label, Konk, and produced their self-titled 1975 album, together with fellow Kinks Dave Davies and John Gosling. However, the album reputedly only sold 600 copies, and the band were unhappy about the instrumentation added in its production.

They released a single, "Whitby Two Step"/"Maybe It's Me", and undertook a nationwide tour supporting Barclay James Harvest before adding a bass player, Nick South (from Vinegar Joe), and drummer Nick Trevisick. They continued to perform in pubs in the London area. After seeing a gig by the Sex Pistols, and becoming increasingly politicised following a raid on a gay bar, Robinson wrote "Glad to Be Gay", which the band performed, but their musical differences soon led to Café Society splitting up before recording a second album. A feud developed between Robinson and Ray Davies, with Davies maintaining control over Robinson's song publishing for some time, and each writing songs critical of the other. Davies wrote "Prince of Punks", B-side of the late 1977 Kinks single "Father Christmas", whilst Robinson wrote "Don't Take No For An Answer", released in early 1978 on the Rising Free live EP.

Robinson formed the successful Tom Robinson Band in 1976, and later became a radio presenter. Hereward Kaye released a solo album, Golden Mile, in 1980; he was later a member of the Flying Pickets, and the lyricist for the 1992 stage musical Moby Dick. In the mid-1980s, Nick South was in Time UK which also featured Danny Kustow from the then-defunct Tom Robinson Band.
