= Hope and Glory =

Hope and Glory may refer to:

- Hope and Glory (film), a 1987 film written and directed by John Boorman
- Hope and Glory (TV series), a British television drama
- Hope & Glory (album), an album by Ann Wilson of Heart
- "Hope & Glory" (song), a song by Swedish singer Måns Zelmerlöw
- Hope and Glory (album), a 1984 album or the title song by Tom Robinson

== See also ==
- "Land of Hope and Glory", a British patriotic song
