= Chippington =

Chippington is a surname. Notable people with the surname include:

- Jeanette Chippington (born 1970), British Paralympic swimmer and paracanoeist
- Ted Chippington (born 1962), British stand-up comedian
