= Jo Burt =

British bassist (born 1953)

- Born: 1953 (age 72–73)
- Genres: Hard rock, heavy metal
- Occupation: Bassist
- Years active: 1979–present
- Website: joburt.co.uk

Jo Burt (born 1953) is an English rock musician. He is possibly best known for being the bassist for Black Sabbath during their 1987 tour, in support of the album The Eternal Idol. He left the band once the tour ended.

Jo Burt was also a founding member of Sector 27 with Tom Robinson - and a member of Virginia Wolf with Jason Bonham. Burt also appears on Freddie Mercury's solo album, Mr. Bad Guy playing fretless bass.

He has written, toured, and performed with many other artists, including The Troggs, Brian Setzer, Bob Geldof, Roger Taylor, James Reyne, Sweet and many more.

Burt continues to write music and now lives in Dorset with his wife, Antonia (a soprano). Burt still performs regularly in the UK, Europe and North America with his band, previously known as The Jo Burt Experience. From 2023, the band is known as Jo Burt & The Lazy Farquhars. He calls his southern-style rock with a Beatles-esque English twist sound "Anglicana" - a term he coined himself - and describes it as "Nashville Rock with an English Accent".

Burt has independently released three albums: Seven Seeds (2012), Indestructible (2015) and Spontaneous (2017). A fourth album Anglicana is released December 2023.
