= Bully for you =

Bully for you may refer to:

== Television ==
- "Bully for You", a 2001 episode of CSI: Crime Scene Investigation
- "Bully for You!", a 1989 episode of The Raccoons

== Songs ==
- "Bully for You", a song by Tom Robinson Band from the 1979 album TRB Two
