= Dave Follows =

British cartoonist (1941–2003)

Dave Follows (3 October 1941 – 17 October 2003) was a British cartoonist best known for his comic strip Creature Feature.

== Career ==
Follows was born in Stafford, Staffordshire, England. His first published cartoon was for the Stafford Advertiser in 1971.

His animal comic strip The Creature Feature appeared weekly in the Sunday Times supplement, Funday Times, from 1990 to 2006. The Creature Feature was also syndicated in over 30 newspapers throughout the world. Follows supplied other strips for newspapers including the north Staffordshire's The Sentinel, where his strip May un Mar Lady appeared daily from 8 July 1985 to 3 October 2003. It is republished in that newspaper under the title May Un Mar Lady Revisited.

When the British comic book Eagle was relaunched in the 1980s, Follows' designed the mascot character, Ernie the Eagle, and produced various weekly Ernie cartoons.

He drew Wonder Wellies, written by Roy Davis, in the comic Buster from 17 September 1983 until August 1985. Follows was a member of The Cartoonists' Club of Great Britain.

== Personal life ==
Follow was married to wife Audrey for 38 years at the time of his death from cancer. The couple had three children, sons Darren, Steve, and Chris. Steve is the guitarist in the Stafford-based band Bradbray Apartment.
