= Potteries dialect =

English dialect of the North Midlands of England

Potteries
- Native to: England
- Region: North Staffordshire
- Language family: Indo-European: Germanic; West Germanic; Ingvaeonic; Anglo-Frisian; Anglic; English; British English; West Midlands English; Potteries
- Early forms: Old English: Middle English; Early Modern English

Language codes
- ISO 639-3: –
- Glottolog: None

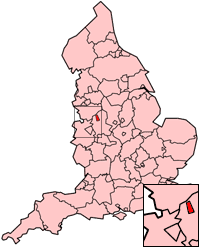
The location of Stoke-on-Trent on a map of England. Potteries dialect is mostly concentrated in this area of the country.

Potteries is an English dialect of the West Midlands of England, almost exclusively in and around Stoke-on-Trent, Staffordshire. The dialect is derived from Anglo Saxon Old English, and it was first documented in 1843.

== Origin and history ==
As with most local dialects in English, Potteries dialect derives originally from Anglo Saxon Old English. The 14th-century Middle English poem Sir Gawain and the Green Knight, which appears in the Cotton Nero A.x manuscript uses dialect words native to the Potteries, leading some scholars to believe that it was written by a monk from Dieulacres Abbey. However, the most commonly suggested candidate for authorship is John Massey of Cotton, Cheshire now part of Cranage outside Holmes Chapel.

The same manuscript contains three religious alliterative poems, Cleanness, Patience and Pearl, which are attributed to the same unknown author. Although the identity of the author is still disputed, J. R. R. Tolkien and E. V. Gordon writing in 1925 concluded that "his home was in the West Midlands of England; so much his language shows, and his metre, and his scenery."

The first documented instance of Potteries dialect was by the prominent Staffordshire lawyer John Ward (1781–1870) and local historian Simeon Shaw in their 1843 book The Borough of Stoke-upon-Trent. Ward recorded phonetically a conversation which he overheard in Burslem marketplace in 1810. In the passage, entitled A Burslem Dialogue, Ward provided an explanation of some of the words unique to the district: 'mewds' (moulds), 'kale' (being called upon in order, first, second....), 'heo' (she), 'shippon' (a cow-house).

From the 1750s onwards the Industrial Revolution created a high concentration of workforce in the ceramic and coal mining industries, working in close proximity in Stoke-on-Trent. This allowed the dialect to develop as a way of speech specific to those industries.

Some observers of Potteries dialect in the 21st century fear it is dying out as a living speech, as fewer young people use it in everyday conversation. Steve Birks cites increased ease of travel, the decline of the pottery industry leading to people moving out of the area to find work, the prevalence of and exposure to Received Pronunciation through television and radio, and the uniformity of the British education system as contributing factors in the decline of the dialect. Alan Povey has predicted that his will be the last generation that speaks Potteries dialect, and that after his generation is gone the dialect will die out for good.

In 2005, Historian Steve Birks pointed out that there have been unsuccessful attempts to eradicate the dialect since the 19th century. John Ward, writing in 1843, noted that the Potteries dialect was "now almost banished by the schoolmasters assiduous care". Birks writes that dialect is still used widely amongst local residents, and is toned down when speaking to visitors to the city to be intelligible to them, which shows the dialect is still present in everyday conversation. He states that there is "a growing interest in preserving, reading about and speaking dialects."

== Phonology ==
The linguist Graham Pointon, a native of the Potteries, has noted the following phonological differences between RP and the modern Potteries accent.

- There is no phoneme /ŋ/, although [ŋ] occurs as an allophone of /n/ before /k, g/, thus, singer rhymes with finger (so-called ng-coalescence).
- The three RP vowels /ʊ, uː, ʌ/ are replaced by two, with different distributions. The foot-strut split is absent like most dialects in the northern half of England, with most cases of RP /ʌ/ being transcribed as /ʊ/, often phonetically realised as [ɔ]. This means that pairs such as but-bought, pun-pawn, full-fall are distinguished by length alone. Some cases of /ʊ/ also use [ɔ], whereas other words (e.g. book) use a long vowel [u:]
- As with most other dialects in the northern half of England, there is also no trap-bath split. The /ɑ:/ phoneme is mostly restricted to stressed word-final position (e.g. spa) and to words when an historic /l/ or /r/ has been elided (e.g. palm, farm).
- H-dropping is common, and conversely any word beginning with a vowel may be emphasised with an initial [h].

The traditional dialect differs much more from RP, but (as with all dialects in England) it is now confined to older residents. The Potteries dialect descends from the West Midlands dialect of Middle English (ME), whereas modern Standard English descends from the East Midlands dialect.

- ME /a/ became /ɒ/ in the West Midland area, so that man is pronounced /mɒn/, and cannot is /kɒnə/.
- ME /eː/ has diphthongised in many cases to /ei/. This has been kept distinct from ME /ai/ which has become a closer monophthongal vowel /iː/. Therefore, see is pronounced /sei/ whereas say is pronounced /siː/.
- ME /iː/ has in many cases merged with ME /eː/ – wife /weif/, mice /meis/. Elsewhere it has undergone the general vowel shift to /ai/, and then simplified to /aː/ and then to /ɑː/ my wife is often called /ˈmɑː liːdi/ (= "my lady").
- ME /el/ has opened to /al/: for example, tell is pronounced /tal/. In final /al/, the /l/ has vocalized and the /a/ backed and risen to form a diphthong /ou/: therefore, ball is pronounced /bou/.

The traditional dialect also preserves older second person singular forms for modal verbs, such as /kɒst/ for can you?

== Lexicon ==
Like all English dialects, the Potteries dialect derives from Anglo-Saxon Old English. Example words and phrases:

- "Nesh" meaning soft, tender, or to easily get cold is derived from the Old English word wikt:hnesce.
- "Slat" meaning to throw, is from the old English "slath", moved.
- "Fang" meaning catch or seize, as in "Fang 'owd of this" – "catch hold of this", is from Old English "fang, fangen". It is a cognate with the modern Swedish word "fånga", as well as the Norwegian word "fange" and the Dutch word "vangen" and German verb "fangen", which means "to catch".
- "Sheed" meaning to spill liquids, most likely derived from the word "shed" in the sense of getting rid of something.
- "Duck" a common term of affection towards both men and women as in "Tow rate owd duck?". "Are you all right dear?"
- "Spanwanned" (agricultural) meaning the state of being stuck astride a wall whilst attempting to climb over it. Probably from the Saxon "spannan winnan", Span Woe.
- "Kidda" meaning mate, friend, or to refer to a child or family member. Compare to "kiddo" which is used in parts of North America for a similar purpose.
- "Bank" meaning hill; also "upbank" and "downbank" for uphill and downhill. e.g. "Tine 'Ow Bank" (Town Hall Bank), local name for Butlers Hill in Cheadle, Staffordshire Moorlands.
- "Bank" also appears as in "pot bank", which is a location where pottery is produced.
- "Lobby" is a local stew similar to the Liverpudlian stew scouse.
- "Gancie" is a word for a jumper/sweater, it comes from the Irish for jumper, "geansaí".
- "Cost tha kick a bo agen a wo an yed it til thee bost eet?" means ... Can you kick a ball against a wall and head it until it bursts?
- "Mar Lady" or "Thar lady", with the emphasis on the first word, refer to one's female girlfriend, partner or spouse. The "y" in My and Thy is pronounced long as "ah", so these are rendered as "Mar Lady" and "Thar Lady".

== In popular culture ==
A popular cartoon called May un Mar Lady, created by Dave Follows, appears in The Sentinel newspaper and is written in the Potteries dialect. A local weekly paper, the 'Cheadle & Tean Times', carries a short column by 'Sosh' remarking on local happenings as a monologue in Staffordshire dialect. Previously The Sentinel has carried other stories in the dialect, most notably the Jabez stories written by Wilfred Bloor under the pseudonym of A Scott.

Alan Povey's Owd Grandad Piggott stories which have aired on BBC Radio Stoke for a number of years, are recited in the Potteries dialect by the author.

The Potteries accent is much more difficult to imitate than Cockney, Scouse, Brummie or Geordie. Few actors from outside the Potteries have managed to master it. Neither in the 1952 film "The Card" nor in the 1976 TV series "Clayhanger", did any actor give a reasonable rendition of the accent. Ken Loach's 1971 film The Rank and File was set in the Potteries and attempted to use the local dialect, but many of the actors were recruited from the film The Big Flame which was set in Liverpool and used Scouse. Toby Jones carried off the accent near flawlessly in the award-winning film Marvellous. His father, actor Freddie Jones, was born in the Potteries.

== See also ==
- Owd Grandad Piggott
- Cheshire dialect

== Bibliography ==
- Arfur Tow Crate in Staffy Cher ISBN 0-905074-00-9
- The 2nd book of Arfur Tow Crate in Staffy Cher ISBN 0-905074-01-7
- Learn Thesen Potteries Dialect ISBN 0956830617
- A Centenary Compendium of the Jabez Stories ISBN 9781511801836
- Wells, John C. (1982). Accents of English. Vol. 1: An Introduction (pp. i–xx, 1–278), Vol. 2: The British Isles (pp. i–xx, 279–466), Vol. 3: Beyond the British Isles (pp. i–xx, 467–674). Cambridge University Press. doi:10.1017/CBO9780511611759, doi:10.1017/CBO9780511611766. ISBN 0-52129719-2, 0-52128540-2, 0-52128541-0.
