= War Baby (song) =

Single by Tom Robinson

from the album Hope and Glory
- B-side: "Hell Yes"
- Released: June 4, 1983
- Recorded: February/March 1983
- Studio: Redan Studios PPA and Regents Park London
- Genre: New wave
- Length: 3:59
- Label: Panic Records Nic 2
- Songwriter(s): Tom Robinson
- Producer(s): Tom Robinson, Dennis Weinreich

Tom Robinson singles chronology
| "Now Martin's Gone" (1982) | "War Baby" (1983) | "Listen to the Radio (Atmospherics)" (1983) |

"War Baby" is a song by Tom Robinson, released as a single in 1983. It reached No. 6 on the UK singles chart, and was included on Robinson's 1984 album Hope and Glory.

== Background ==
After the break-up of his band Sector 27, Robinson was "massively in debt, particularly with the British tax authorities", was "technically bankrupt", and depressed, so in 1982 he went to stay with a friend in Hamburg, Germany. He learnt German and started playing in Germany, including in East Berlin (seven years before the fall of the Berlin Wall), with East German band NO 55.

Robinson describes writing the song, whilst stoned, after a bad experience at a gay sauna, he "...wrote straight down 'only the very young and the very beautiful can be so aloof.' And the rest of it poured out onto the page, eight, ten pages of the stuff, just hand-written, stream of consciousness stuff. And it took about a year to get those ten pages down to something that you could actually sing in four minutes."

The song has been described as being about his experiences of the divisions between East and West Germany. However, it has also been said that "As to what it's actually about, Tom Robinson himself couldn't tell you – he just wrote what 'sounded right.'"

He returned to the UK, recorded and released the song, promoted it in a series of late night cabaret performances at the Edinburgh Fringe and, once it had charted, appeared on Top of the Pops.

== Release and reception ==
"War Baby" was released as a single (Cat No Panic Records 2) on 4 June 1983, peaking at No. 6 on the UK singles chart, on 25 June 1983, and stayed in the Top Ten for a further two weeks, and spent a total of nine weeks in the Top 40. The No. 6 spot was just short of the achievement of his 1977 single "2-4-6-8 Motorway" with the Tom Robinson Band, which reached No. 5. It reached No. 1 on the UK Indie chart and stayed at No. 1 for three weeks. It later appeared on Robinson's 1984 album Hope and Glory and revived his career.

Robinson has said that although "My flip answer to the question of what song am I the most proud is "(Wish I Had a) Grey Cortina" ... the true answer is "War Baby" is the song that I'm most proud of. ... I think it's the most truthful song that I've written, because I didn't think about it at all."

Robert Christgau described it as "a wrenching triumph", whilst Adam Smith said "War Baby, with its cryptic, elliptical lyrics, could have been written in 1974, 1984, 1994, or just about any time. It's one of those magical songs which seems to sit like an anchor while times and styles just flow around it."

A video of the song was made in 1983, directed by John Pearse.

The song was blacklisted by the BBC during the first Gulf War (1990–91), but later featured in the TV series Ashes to Ashes, appearing on the Ashes to Ashes – Series 3 (Original Soundtrack) album.

The song was still being performed by Robinson in October 2023.

== Charts ==
| Chart (1983/4) | Peak position |
|---|---|
| Australia (Kent Music Report) | 73 |
| United Kingdom (Official Charts Company) | 6 |

== Personnel ==
- Tom Robinson – vocal and acoustic guitar
- Steve Laurie – drums
- Sean Mayes – keyboard and backing vocals
- Simon Skinner – bass
- Ebo Ross – percussion and backing vocals
- Mark Ramsden – saxophone
- Danny Kustow – guitar
- Nigel Bennett – additional guitar
- Lyrics and music by Tom Robinson, with saxophone parts by Mark Ramsden.

A 12" single version was recorded with different personnel, so is not just a remix, and unusually for a 12" single is a slower, stripped back version. Both versions were later included on the CD re-release War Baby: Hope And Glory [1984]

- Tom Robinson – vocal, acoustic guitar and synthesizers
- Steve Laurie – drums and percussion
- Sean Mayes – keyboard and backing vocals
- Pat Davey – bass
- Ebo Ross – backing vocals
- Mark Ramsden – saxophone
- Paul Harvey – guitar
- Dzal Martin – guitar

It was also issued as a CD single in 1992 Cooking Vinyl – FRYCD022 other tracks being "Blood Brother", "We Didn't Know (What Was Going On)" and "War Baby" (Live).

"War Baby" was covered by Big Wreck on their 2014 release Ghosts.
