= Death of Liddle Towers =

British boxer (1936–1976)

Liddle Towers
- Born: 19 September 1936; Chester-le-Street, County Durham, England
- Died: 9 February 1976 (aged 39); Dryburn Hospital, County Durham, England
- Occupations: Electrician, boxing coach
- Known for: Death caused by police action

Liddle Towers (19 September 1936 – 9 February 1976) was an electrician and amateur boxing coach from Chester-le-Street, County Durham, England, who died following a spell in police custody in 1976.

== Death ==
Towers was arrested outside the Key Club in Birtley, Tyne and Wear on 16 January 1976 by PC Goodner. After a struggle he was put into a dog van by six policemen and taken to Gateshead police station. Later, at 4 am, he was taken from the station to Queen Elizabeth Hospital because he complained of not feeling well, and, after an examination which apparently revealed no injury and nothing wrong with him, he was taken back to the cells. He was discharged later that morning at 10 o'clock.

The taxi driver who took Towers home and his local GP, Alan Powney, who saw him later that day at 2 o'clock, gave evidence that was consistent with Towers' account of his having been assaulted in the cells. Towers told a friend "They gave us a bloody good kicking outside the Key Club, but that was nowt to what I got when I got inside". Towers died on 9 February 1976 at Dryburn Hospital, County Durham.

On 8 October 1976, an inquest into his death returned a verdict of justifiable homicide. The case had been reported in the national press and the verdict was widely criticised, causing considerable disquiet over both the integrity of the Northumbria Police and of police behaviour and accountability in general. On 3 May 1977, the Attorney-General, in answer to a Written Question from the MP for Chester-le-Street Giles Radice, said that the DPP had "decided that the evidence was not such as to justify the institution of criminal proceedings against any officer". On 8 July the Home Secretary recorded his refusal to set up an inquiry under the provision of S32 Police Act (1964).

The justifiable homicide verdict was appealed and, in June 1978, was set aside by the Queen's Bench Divisional Court, which ordered a new inquest. The second inquest, held in Bishop Auckland in October 1978, reached a verdict of death by misadventure. The Towers case was thought to have influenced the outcome of a similar case from 2009 where a newspaper seller, Ian Tomlinson, was also killed by police.

== In popular culture ==
- In 1977, the mod band The Jam were critical of the police in their song "Time for Truth" which contains the lyric "Bring forward the six pigs, We wanna see them swing so high" and a shout of "Liddle Towers".
- The following year, punk band the Angelic Upstarts released a single entitled "The Murder of Liddle Towers" in 1978.
- 1978 also saw the release of the single "Justifiable Homicide", by Sex Pistols producer Dave Goodman.
- The Tom Robinson Band dedicated their 1979 album, TRB Two to Mary Towers, the mother of Liddle Towers. The song "Blue Murder" on this album relates to the death of Towers.
- British Skinhead band The Crux (not the US band) also did a song called "Liddle Towers" about the incident.
