= Jimmy Edwards (musician) =

English singer and songwriter (1949–2015)

- Born: 18 April 1949; Chiswick, England,
- Died: 13 January 2015 (aged 65)
- Genres: New wave

James Arthur Edwards (18 April 1949 – 13 January 2015) was an English singer and songwriter who fronted numerous bands from the 1960s until his death in 2015. He was best known as the lead singer of the 1980s new wave band Time UK. The band featured Rick Buckler (formerly of The Jam), Danny Kustow (Tom Robinson Band), Ray Simone, and initially Martin Gordon (Sparks) on bass, who was later replaced by Nick South (associated with Yoko Ono Band, Sniff 'n' the Tears, and Steve Marriott's All Stars). Simone had also been a member of Edwards' late-seventies punk/new wave band, Masterswitch.

== Early life and ancestry ==
Born in Chiswick, England, on 18 April 1949, Edwards grew up in Kensal Rise until age 11, when his family moved to Ashford, Middlesex. His maternal grandmother was Russian and had lived in Berlin in the 1920s. According to Edwards, his mother, born circa 1912, may have been born out of wedlock. Edwards' father owned a pair of blue collar companies. In the 1980s, Edwards married singer, Honey Bane.

== Career ==
Edwards' musical career began in the 1960s initially with mod band The Cult (1963–64). He then formed The Neat Change in 1966, sometimes cited as one of the first Skinhead bands. This group gained a strong following among London mods and skinheads and played frequently at the Marquee Club, reportedly earning comparisons to contemporaries like Small Faces and The Who. Their only single, "I Lied to Auntie May" written by Peter Frampton and featuring Peter Banks was released on Decca Records, is now considered a genre classic. Other early bands included The Washington Flyers, Stumpy, Guest & Edwards; and English Rose (1968–72), the latter formed with Lynton Guest of Love Affair and briefly featured Neil Peart on drums. Music by English Rose ("Yesterday's Hero") appeared in the film Groupie Girl (also known as I Am a Groupie), in which Edwards also had an acting role, playing the character "Bob" under the billing "Jimmie Edwardes".

During the early 1970s, Edwards worked in A&R (Artists and Repertoire) at Dawn Records, where he signed Carl Douglas's major hit "Kung Fu Fighting." While involved in both A&R and his own music projects alongside Lynton Guest and Steve Holley (drummer for Wings), Edwards also played a role in helping Ian Dury get discovered.

Between 1975 and 1977 Edwards formed and fronted the band Masterswitch, which subsequently signed to Epic Records. In 1978, they released the single "Action Replay," but it suffered from poor promotion. Despite receiving a reported one-million-pound advance from Epic, the band faced significant issues, including a dispute over the international ownership rights to the band's name, which led to suggestions they should split and reform. Disillusioned, Edwards disbanded Masterswitch in 1978. Following the breakup, Edwards recorded several solo singles under the name Jimmy Edwards and the Profile, released through Warner Brothers and Polydor. One single, "Nora's Diary," was produced by Jimmy Pursey of Sham 69.

In 1979, when Jimmy Pursey briefly left Sham 69, Edwards was brought in as the replacement singer. A single was recorded during this period but remained unreleased, as Pursey rejoined Sham 69 after his planned supergroup with members of the Sex Pistols, The Sham Pistols, did not materialise.

Edwards contributed as a backing singer on the album "This Is Your Life" by Twist, Peter Marsh's post punk band, in 1979.

Edwards also recorded unreleased demos with The Pretenders, whose members expressed admiration for his work. Consequently, some Pretenders members recorded with Edwards on his solo material, credited as "The Profile." The solo single "Twentieth Century Time" was engineered by Pete Wilson, who later produced The Jam and The Style Council. Edwards also recorded a cover of The Jam's "In the City," incorporating a lyric change approved by Paul Weller. Produced by Godley & Creme (of 10cc) and released on Polydor Records, this version failed to chart.

Following The Jam's split in 1982, drummer Rick Buckler contacted Edwards, leading to the formation of Time UK in 1983. Edwards wrote the songs for the band between 1983 and 1985. In 1983, Time UK achieved a minor UK hit with "The Cabaret/Remember Days," which sold 60,000 copies and reached number 63 on the British charts (an earlier version of "The Cabaret" had been recorded by Edwards three years prior with The Profile). This single was the first release by a former Jam member after the band's breakup, preceding releases by Paul Weller and Bruce Foxton. However, Time UK narrowly missed a performance on the BBC's "Top of the Pops" due to a Gallup investigation into alleged chart rigging. Edwards contended that legitimate sales were consequently disregarded, resulting in the denial of their appearance.

The band followed this with the Tony Visconti-produced single "Playground of Privilege"/"Puppets Don't Bleed," and later "You Won't Stop" on Arista Records; neither charted. Their television appearances included the BBC's Saturday Superstore. Many Time UK recordings, along with later tracks ("Entertain Me," "Sunday Mood," "So Say Hurrah") recorded under the moniker Sharp, were eventually compiled on the 2002 CD "One More Time." The Sharp sessions, recorded in 1986 for the Unicorn label, featured both Rick Buckler and Bruce Foxton – marking the only recorded reunion of The Jam's rhythm section after the band's split. "Entertain Me" was Sharp's sole single. Edwards wrote all the songs for both Time UK and Sharp. His musical influences at this time included David Bowie, The Jam, XTC, The Psychedelic Furs, and early Pink Floyd.

Edwards collaborated with Sham 69 again in 2011. He performed solo shows in 2014 and had plans to record with Dave Davies of The Kinks the following year. Throughout his four-decade career, Edwards' other recording collaborators included Godley & Creme, Flintlock, and Mean Streets. Although he came close to mainstream success on several occasions, factors such as A&R difficulties, unfortunate timing, bad luck, or conflicts with record companies frequently prevented widespread recognition.

Following a short illness, James Arthur Edwards died of cancer on 13 January 2015, at the age of 65.
