= Rick Buckler =

English drummer (1955–2025)

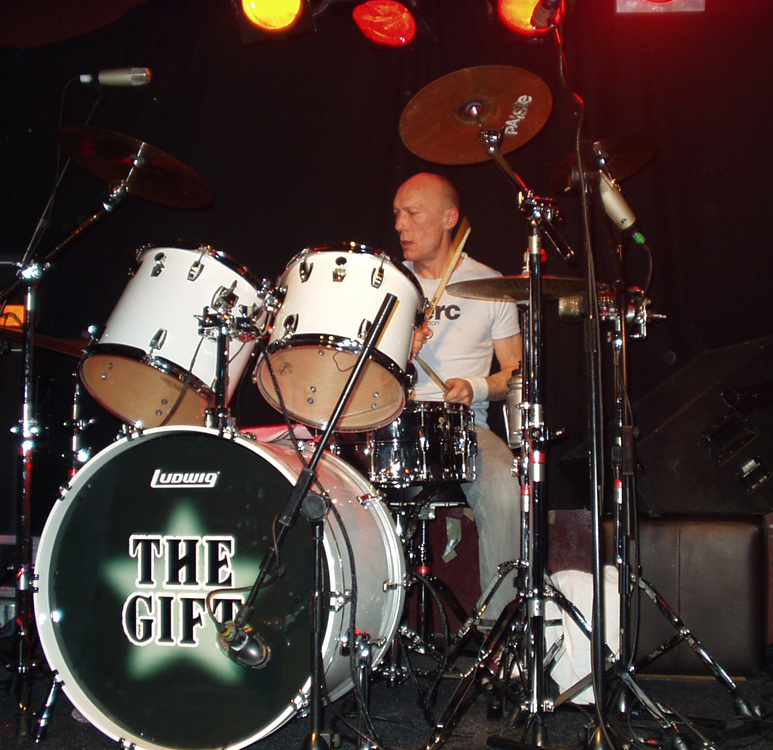
- Buckler performing in 2006

Background information
- Born: Paul Richard Buckler; 6 December 1955; Woking, Surrey, England
- Died: 17 February 2025 (aged 69) Woking, Surrey, England
- Genres: Punk rock; new wave; rock
- Occupations: Drummer; percussionist; songwriter; producer
- Instrument: Drums
- Years active: 1972–1995; 2005–2025
- Labels: Polydor; Detour; Invisible Hands Music
- Formerly of: The Jam; Time UK; Sharp; The Highliners; The Fourth Wall; The Gift; From the Jam; If
- Website: thejamfan.net

Paul Richard Buckler (6 December 1955 – 17 February 2025) was an English musician who was the drummer of the rock band the Jam.

Although the Jam's creative output came to be attributed primarily to Paul Weller, its rhythm section of Buckler and Bruce Foxton (bass guitar) were integral to its sound. In retrospect, Buckler felt that Weller had been given undue credit for the band's song catalogue to the detriment of its other members' contributions.

In the mid-1980s, Buckler briefly reunited with Foxton, and with Jimmy Edwards they performed in a new band called Sharp, recording some new songs for the short-lived Unicorn record label. After his own band Time UK broke up, Buckler moved into production, running a studio in Islington, working on the album Bound for Glory by the Highliners (which he also drummed for briefly in 1990). He was also involved in the production of the debut studio album of the Family Cat, Tell 'Em We're Surfin (1989).

In the mid-1990s, Buckler abandoned professional music and went into business as an ad hoc carpenter, fashioning cabinets and 'distressed' furniture in Woking, Surrey. In 2005, Buckler re-entered professional music when he set up a new band called the Gift, named after the final studio album release by the Jam, with Russell Hastings and Dave Moore, with himself on drums, playing exclusively old material from the Jam's back catalogue. In 2007, Foxton joined as the bassist and the new band began touring under the name of From the Jam. After four years of touring, Buckler left From the Jam in September 2009.

== Early years ==
Paul Richard Buckler was born on 6 December 1955 in the town of Woking in the county of Surrey, England, to Bill and Peggy Buckler (nee White), a telephone engineer and factory worker respectively. He received his education at Sheerwater Secondary School, in Woking. While there in the early 1970s, he joined other pupils Paul Weller and Bruce Foxton in a newly formed band named the Jam. Buckler began an A-Level in technical drawing but abandoned his studies after a year. He worked as a trainee draughtsman for four years until the Jam's breakthrough.

== The Jam ==
The Jam emerged at the same time as punk rock bands such as the Clash, the Damned, and the Sex Pistols. The Clash were early advocates of the band, and added them as the support on their White Riot tour in May 1977.

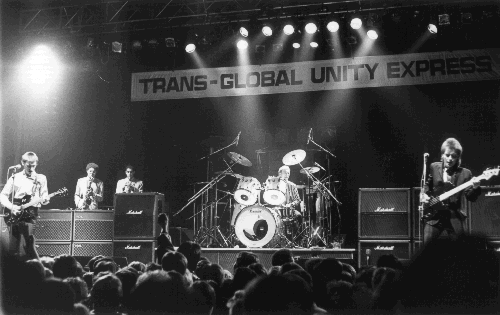
The Jam performing live in Newcastle upon Tyne during their Trans-global Unity tour, April 1982.

The Jam's first single, "In the City", took them into the UK Top 40 in May 1977. In 1979, the group released "The Eton Rifles" and first broke into the Top 10, hitting the No. 3 spot in November. The increasing popularity of their blend of Weller's barbed lyrics with pop melodies eventually led to their first number one single, "Going Underground", in March 1980.

The Jam became the first band since the Beatles to perform both sides of the same single ("Town Called Malice" and "Precious") on one edition of Top of the Pops. They also had two singles, "That's Entertainment" (1981) and "Just Who Is the 5 O'Clock Hero?" (1982), reach No. 21 and No. 8 respectively in the UK singles chart despite not being released as singles in the UK—on the strength of import sales of the German single releases. At that time, "That's Entertainment" was the best-selling import-only single to date in the UK charts.

Buckler was the drummer for the Jam from its formation in the early 1970s through to its break-up in the early 1980s, during which time it became a critically acclaimed and commercially successful rock band with an original sound as part of the mod revival movement in England's music and fashion scenes of the period.

== Later career ==
In 1983, Buckler set up a new band entitled Time UK, featuring himself on drums, Jimmy Edwards and Ray Simone, Danny Kustow, and the bassist Martin Gordon. In the mid-1980s, Buckler briefly reunited with his former Jam bandmate Bruce Foxton, and with Jimmy Edwards they performed in a new band called Sharp, recording some new songs for the short-lived Unicorn record label. These recordings were subsequently reissued on a Time UK anthology release. After Time UK broke up, Buckler moved into production, running a studio in Islington, working on the album Bound for Glory by the Highliners (which he also drummed for briefly in 1990). He was also involved in the production of the debut studio album of the Family Cat, Tell 'Em We're Surfin (1989). In the mid-1990s, Buckler abandoned professional music and went into business as an ad hoc carpenter, fashioning cabinets and 'distressed' furniture in Woking, Surrey.

In November 2005, Buckler re-entered professional music when he set up a new band called the Gift, named after the final studio album release by the Jam, with Russell Hastings (lead vocals/guitar) and Dave Moore (bass guitar), with himself on drums, playing exclusively old material from the Jam's back catalogue. In 2007, Bruce Foxton joined as the bassist (Moore moving to rhythm guitar and keyboards) and the new band began touring under the name of From the Jam. After four years of touring, Buckler left From the Jam in September 2009, being replaced by Mark Brzezicki of Big Country. Criticism of the new act from a distance by Paul Weller confirmed that it was not going to be a means of a reformation of the original band, and Buckler felt that to continue performing with it without Weller, ran the risk of his and Foxton's finding themselves in the situation of becoming a Jam tribute band.

In July 2012, Buckler ceremonially unveiled an oak wood abstract art sculpture by Richard Heys, entitled "The Space Between", on the Guildford Road in Woking, commissioned at a cost of £45,000 by Woking Borough Council to commemorate the Jam in the band's home town. In 2013, Buckler moved into a management consultancy role for new musical acts, including singer-guitarist Sarah Jane, and the band the Brompton Mix. Buckler's autobiography, entitled That's Entertainment: My Life in the Jam, was published in 2015 by Omnibus Press.

== Personal life and death ==
Buckler lived with his wife Lesley in Woking; they had two children. After leaving the Jam he authored several publications on the act's history. Buckler died following a brief illness in Woking, on 17 February 2025, at the age of 69. Weller paid tribute to Buckler, saying, "I'm shocked and saddened by Rick's passing. I'm thinking back to us all rehearsing in my bedroom in Stanley Road, Woking."

== Publications ==
- The Jam: Our Story (1994) ISBN 9781898141105
- The Jam Unseen (2007) ISBN 9781905736836
- That's Entertainment: My Life in the Jam (2015) ISBN 9781783057948
- Dead Straight Guide to the Jam (2017) ISBN 9781911346081
- The Start to '77 (2017) ISBN 9781527211612
- This Day in Music's Guide to the Jam (2018) ISBN 9781999592776
- The Jam 1982 (2022) ISBN 9781913172695
