= Creature Feature (comic strip) =

Creature Feature is an animal gag cartoon strip that appeared weekly in the Sunday Times supplement, Funday Times, for over 15 years, and is currently syndicated throughout the world, including in Germany and the Middle East (Khaleej Times). Created by cartoonist Dave Follows, Creature Feature is still the longest running cartoon strip ever to appear in The Sunday Times supplement.

The last printed edition of the Funday Times was published on Sunday, March 12, 2006. After that date, it was only available online. The print edition of the Funday Times ran for 880 issues before it was discontinued. The website mostly concentrates on features and games, although there are now comic strips on the website that were originally in the printed version.
