= Time UK (band) =

English rock band with Rick Buckler

- Genres: New wave; alternative rock
- Years active: 1983–1985
- Labels: Arcade; Arista

Time UK were a mid-1980s English rock band with Rick Buckler, the former drummer with the Jam. The group released three singles.

== Career ==
On 30 October 1982, the Jam issued a handwritten statement announcing their split. A final single, "Beat Surrender", went straight to number one and a farewell tour culminated in a gig at the Brighton Centre on 11 December 1982. After that, the three band members went their separate ways.

Buckler formed Time UK with Jimmy Edwards (lead vocals) and Ray Simone (guitar), both former members of Masterswitch, Danny Kustow (guitar) from the Tom Robinson Band and former Sparks/Radio Stars bass guitarist Martin Gordon. Gordon recorded demos and performed only one gig with the band before being replaced by Nick South, formerly of the Yoko Ono Band, Sniff 'n' the Tears and Steve Marriott's All Stars.

The band was originally called the Time. Though the reason for the name change is not known, when the band was first formed journalists speculated that the name might cause conflict with an American group of the same name.

One of the band's first live performances was a free gig at Sheffield University Students Union on Saturday 25 June 1983. The line-up of bands was varied with local goths the Sisters of Mercy, the singer of the "recent" disco hit "It's So High" Matt Fretton and the R&B and soul group the Ruby Turner Band also on the bill.

Time UK sold nearly 60,000 copies of their first single, "The Cabaret". Released on Red Bus Records, it entered the official chart on 8 October 1983, reaching No. 63 during its three-week stay. Produced and engineered by Robbie Farnon, the 12 inch and double-pack 7 inch included a track called "Arcade Radio Present TIME UK the Beginning (The Radio Show)", a mock show with snippets of several demo tracks including the future B-side "Puppets Don't Bleed".

A year and a half later, the follow-up single, "Playground of Privilege", produced by Tony Visconti, was released on Arista Records with little impact, despite an appearance on the BBC Saturday morning TV show Saturday Superstore.

After a third single, "You Won't Stop", the band effectively ceased. Buckler and Edwards briefly formed a new band, Sharp, with Buckler's former bandmate from the Jam, Bruce Foxton. The single, "Entertain Me", released on the UK independent Mod label Unicorn Records, included the only three tracks recorded by the band.

In 2002, a compilation album, One More Time, assembled recorded material from Time UK and Sharp, including several previously unreleased tracks.

== Personnel ==
- Rick Buckler - drums
- Jimmy Edwards - vocals
- Danny Kustow - guitar, vocals
- Ray Simone - guitar, vocals
- Nick South - bass guitar, vocals
- Fletcher Christian (on second and third singles)

== Discography ==
=== Album ===
- One More Time (DRCD 041, Detour Records, 2002)

=== Singles ===
- "The Cabaret" / "Remember Days" / "The Radio Show" (this track on 12" and double 7" only) (Red Bus, Arcadia, TIME 123), 1983 - UK No. 63
- "Playground of Privilege" / "Puppets Don't Bleed" (Arista, ARIST 597), 1985
- "You Won't Stop" / "Things We Love the Best" (Arista, ARIST 637), 1985
