= Sharp (English band) =

English rock band

- Genres: New wave; alternative rock
- Years active: 1985–86
- Label: Unicorn-Kanchana
- Past members: Rick Buckler; Jimmy Edwards; Bruce Foxton

Sharp were an English new wave band active during the mid-1980s, featuring former Jam members Bruce Foxton and Rick Buckler. They released one standalone single, in 1986.

== History ==
After the Jam broke up in 1982, Bruce Foxton pursued a solo career and Rick Buckler formed Time UK, featuring Jimmy Edwards on vocals. After a stop-start career that took over two years to release three singles, and a rapid dwindling of the initial public interest in the band, they effectively broke up.

Foxton, finding his solo career had followed a similar path to Time UK's, recorded several tracks with Buckler and Edwards. A standalone single, "Entertain Me", was released on the independent record label Unicorn, a label created by Mark Johnson a Mod newsletter publisher.

Tracks from the release were included on a 2002 Time UK compilation album, One More Time.

== Band members ==
- Rick Buckler – drums
- Jimmy Edwards – vocals, guitar, keyboards
- Bruce Foxton – bass guitar, backing vocals

== Discography ==
- "Entertain Me"/"So Say Hurrah" (7", Unicorn PHZ5), 1986
- "Entertain Me"/"So Say Hurrah"/"Next Generation" (12", Unicorn 12PHZ5), 1986
- One More Time (Time UK compilation album, Detour DRCD041), 2002
