= Ted Chippington =

British stand-up comedian

- Born: Francis Smyth; February 1962 (age 64); Stoke-on-Trent, Staffordshire, England

Comedy career
- Years active: 1981–1990, 2007-present
- Genres: Surreal, deadpan, anti-humour
- Website: http://www.myspace.com/revtedchippington

Ted Chippington (real name Francis Smyth; born February 1962 in Stoke-on-Trent, Staffordshire, England) is a British stand-up comedian.

Noted for his diffident on-stage persona, Chippington avoids observational comedy in favour of anti-humour and jokes which are mostly variations on the same theme, delivered in a West Midlands monotone. He also frequently performs his own versions of well-known songs in a similarly listless style. His act has left audiences bemused or hostile, with heckling a frequent occurrence during his performances.

His deadpan style has won him a small number of devoted followers. Stewart Lee has often cited Chippington as the reason he began stand-up comedy, describing Chippington's act as "a mixture of surrealism and insolent provocation and uncompromising boredom" and citing him as "the first post-alternative comedian". Another admirer, Richard Herring, talks of Chippington's "contempt for the very idea of jokes". For his part Chippington – who describes his own act as being influenced by Lenny Bruce and Owd Grandad Piggott – says he is an "anti-comedian" and that he only started doing his act "to annoy people". He has even claimed that his main reason for retiring from the stage in the 1990s was that he was becoming too popular.

== Early years ==
Chippington started performing in 1981 under the name "Eddie Chippington" before changing to Ted "due to maturity and baldness". He first came to national prominence when a gig he had performed in Birmingham in 1984 supporting the Fall was released by local record label Vindaloo on a 7" EP entitled Non Stop Party Hits of the '50s, '60s and '70s. The EP title refers to his penchant for performing his own versions of classic hits, including on this occasion his rendering of Ottawan's "D.I.S.C.O.". The record was played by John Peel on his BBC Radio One programme – a rare occurrence for a comedian.

In 1986 he released an album, Man in a Suitcase – a collection of live recordings plus some more songs, including his versions of "She Loves You" and Alvin Stardust's "I Feel Like Buddy Holly" – which reached the Top 10 indie album chart. "She Loves You" received wider exposure after Steve Wright repeatedly played it on his Radio 1 show, which in turn led to the track being released as a single by Warner Brothers. It narrowly failed to make the Top 75 but Chippington claims that the deal with Warners' earned him "£1,000 and a nice curry".

Despite its failure to crack the charts, "She Loves You" raised Chippington's profile considerably and led to numerous media appearances, including a turn on the BBC's lunchtime magazine show Pebble Mill at One, the latter fulfilling a lifelong ambition.

Chippington also fielded interviews with the New Musical Express, Birmingham's BRMB and the colour supplement of the Mail on Sunday. He also performed at the Glastonbury and Reading festivals.

Chippington once again came close to mainstream UK Singles Chart success with a 1986 recording of his theme tune "Rockin' with Rita (Head to Toe)" which he performed with his fellow Vindaloo artists the Nightingales and We've Got a Fuzzbox and We're Gonna Use It. A further single followed with his reading of Dion's "The Wanderer", in which the boastfulness of the original lyrics was turned on its head: "I'm not the wanderer, I'm not the wanderer...not too keen on roaming around and around and around."

At a time when the alternative comedy boom was at its peak, Chippington – who once claimed his favourite comedian was Bernard Manning – struggled to break through to a wider audience.

== Retirement ==
In 1990, feeling overwhelmed by the media attention, Chippington retired from show business and emigrated to the US. Rumours circulated that he had gone there to work as a truck driver, but he was working in Los Angeles as a chef. He later returned to the UK, getting married and settling in Torquay after a spell in London.

== Return to performing ==
In 2007 he started performing again. Initially styling himself the "Reverend Ted Chippington", he ditched his old Teddy Boy stage outfit in favour of a vicar's dog-collar. He also changed much of his material.

In 2007 a CD boxset of Chippington's earlier work, entitled Walking Down the Road, was released on Robert Lloyd's Big Print label. A tribute to Chippington entitled "Tedstock", featuring Stewart Lee, Richard Herring and numerous other stand-up comedians, was held at London's Bloomsbury Theatre in order to fund this release. This event led to a new flurry of media appearances for Chippington, including articles in national newspapers and television and radio appearances.

Since his return, he has toured regularly, invariably with the Nightingales, and visiting France, Switzerland, Austria, Germany and Ireland. He has also made guest appearances on the Marc Riley and Phill Jupitus radio shows.

== Discography ==
=== Albums ===
- Can't Really Be Bad (1982) [2 vol.?bootleg? CDs - no date] Cut Your Fringe Off Music
- Man in a Suitcase (1986), Vindaloo - UK Indie #5
- Walking Down the Road (box set) (2007), Big Print

=== Singles and EPs ===
- Non-Stop Party Hits of the '50s, '60s & '70s EP (1985), Vindaloo
- "She Loves You" (1986), Vindaloo - UK No. 77
- "Rockin' with Rita (Head to Toe)" (1986), Vindaloo (as part of the Vindaloo Summer Special) - UK No. 56
- "(I'm Not) the Wanderer" (1987), Vindaloo - UK Indie No. 28
- Is that Squirrel Relevant? EP (2010) – Otalgia featuring Ted Chippington
- Blues Fan EP (2012), Respect Vinyl
