= The Highliners =

British rock and roll / psychobilly band

- Origin: London, England
- Genres: British rock and roll; psychobilly
- Years active: 1984–present
- Labels: ABC; Razor
- Members: Luke Morgan; Chris Finch; Ginger Meadham; Mark Bending
- Past members: Kev Feeney; Tim Potter; Ben Blakeman; Rick Buckler; Mad Andy Kandil; Ricky Lee Sardi
- Website: thehighliners.co.uk

The Highliners are a British rock and roll/psychobilly band. They are known for wearing pink Dr. Martens boots and black capes and for driving a pink van with a skeleton surfing on the roof.

== History ==
The Highliners were formed in London in 1984 by Luke Morgan and Chris Finch, who met while studying at the Central School of Art and Design. The band’s name was inspired by the Mk2 Ford Consuls and Zephyrs owned by its members. In 1985, Luke Morgan, Chris Finch, Kev "Stretch" Feeney, and drummer Tim Potter travelled to France in a pink split-screen Volkswagen bus for a three-month tour of the French Riviera.

Before 1986, The Highliners went through several drummers. That year, Roy Williams of Nervous Records introduced Ginger Meadham, formerly of The Meteors, the Ricochets, and Guana Batz, to the band. By 1987, the four-piece group had secured a television residency on the Channel 4 programme Comedy Wavelength, alongside Paul Merton and Josie Lawrence. They were later joined by Ben Blakeman (formerly of the Cocteau Twins) on lead guitar, and frequently headlined John Curd's psychobilly club, the Klub Foot in Hammersmith, where their pink van became a familiar landmark. The band was recorded live there on 16 January 1988 for the album Stomping at the Klub Foot 5, which was released two months later, in March 1988.

Their final headline performance at the Klub Foot, on 26 June 1988, was part of the 13-night farewell series, known as The Final Curtain, held before the demolition of The Clarendon Hotel, Hammersmith.

The Highliners achieved modest UK singles chart success with the single "Henry the Wasp" which reached number 79, and "Tell Me Things" which peaked at number 96 in October 1988. Their debut album, Bound for Glory, was released in 1989 on Razor Records.

Rick Buckler of The Jam later replaced Ginger Meadham on drums, having previously worked with Mike Spencer on the final mix and production of the album. Buckler toured the UK and Europe with the band in 1990. Fanzines from that period featured artwork by Luke Morgan, Chris Finch, and Vaun Richards of the Funday Times.

In 2010, Ginger Meadham returned for his first performance with the band in more than 20 years, at the Pineda de Mar Psychobilly Meeting in Spain. Lead vocalist Luke Morgan and drummer Meadham were joined by Mad Andy Kandil on guitar and Ricky Lee Sardi on bass as the band continued to tour and record. In 2019, Mark Bending, who had been part of the psychobilly scene since 1983, joined as lead guitarist. In 2024, the band's original saxophonist, Chris Finch, rejoined completing the current lineup.

== Discography ==
- Studio demo – four tracks on cassette, 1986
- "Double Shot" (ABC, 1988)
- "Henry the Wasp" (ABC, 1988), UK singles number 79
- Stomping at The Klub Foot 5 (ABC, 1988), compilation album
- "The Benny Hill Boogie" (Razor, 1989)
- Bound for Glory (Razor, 1989)
- ABC/ID The Psychobilly Singles Collection
- Psychomania Vol. 3 (DoJo, 1995), compilation album
- Fetish Party EP (Nervous, 1998)
- Spank'O'Matic (JPB, 2000)
- Gravedigger Stomp EP (2013)
- The Diablo Session (2014)
