= May un Mar Lady =

Cartoon strip by Dave Follows

May un Mar Lady is a cartoon strip written in Potteries dialect, which first appeared on 8 July 1986 in the North Staffordshire Sentinel and has been a local institution for over 20 years. Now, the full twenty-year run (7,000 strips) of cartoonist Dave Follows' daily cartoon strip is being republished in the Evening Sentinel, as May Un Mar Lady Revisited. Follows lived in Staffordshire all his life. He had a special soft spot for the Potteries and its people. The Sentinel's editor Sean Dooley said:

I’m sure Dave’s humour will be as sharp and as relevant the second time round – it is rooted in the marvellous observations of human relationships – a timeless humour that will stand as a tribute to his talent for years to come.

And Alan Cookman of The Sentinel described the comeback as, “The most exciting homecoming since Stanley Matthews returned to Stoke from his footballing adventure with Blackpool.”
