= 2-4-6-8 Motorway =

Single by Tom Robinson Band
- A-side: "2-4-6-8 Motorway"
- B-side: "I Shall Be Released"
- Released: 7 October 1977
- Recorded: Berwick Street Studio; 14 September 1977
- Studio: Berwick street studio
- Genre: Rock; new wave
- Length: 3:20
- Label: EMI
- Songwriter: Tom Robinson
- Producer: Vic Maile

Tom Robinson Band singles chronology
"2-4-6-8 Motorway" (1977)	"Rising Free" (1978)

Official audio
- "2-4-6-8 Motorway" on YouTube

"2-4-6-8 Motorway" is a song by Tom Robinson. It was released as a single in 1977 by British punk rock/new wave group the Tom Robinson Band, and reached No. 5 in the UK Singles Chart.

== Song information ==
The music and lyrics were written by Tom Robinson. The song was the first single released by the Tom Robinson Band, who had formed in January 1977 and was signed to EMI in August 1977.

Robinson wrote the song between leaving Café Society in 1976 and forming the Tom Robinson Band the following year, at a time when he was performing with whichever friends were available on the night; thus, the song had to be simple enough to learn in a few minutes.

Robinson came up with the tune 'trying to work out the chords to Climax Blues Band's "Couldn't Get It Right"' which he could not really remember. This led to the simple three-chord repeat of "2-4-6-8". The verse came from Robinson's memories of driving back to London through the night after gigs with Café Society: "By the time our van hit the last stretch of M1 into London the motorway sun really was coming up with the morning light." The numerical chants in the chorus were taken from a Gay Liberation chant: "2, 4, 6, 8, Gay is twice as good as straight... 3, 5, 7, 9, Lesbians are mighty fine".

EMI initially turned the song down. However, after touring the band became much tighter, and guitarist Danny Kustow expanded his riffs, which persuaded EMI to release the record.

The song is about the joys of driving a lorry through a rainy night, until dawn. Although the chorus is based upon a gay liberation chant, this is not clear to the casual listener, so the song is in contrast to their far more blatantly political later songs, covering subjects such as homophobia ("Glad to Be Gay") and civil disorder ("Long Hot Summer").

== Release and reception ==
"2-4-6-8 Motorway" was originally released on 7 October 1977 and immediately attracted attention. It rose to No. 5 in the UK Singles Chart on 22 October 1977, and stayed on the chart for 9 weeks. This is Robinson's highest charting single; his later (solo) single "War Baby" reached No. 6. The band performed it on Top of the Pops on 27 October, and again on 10 November.

Robert Christgau described it as an "instant hit" whilst David Quantick described the song as "somewhere between a terrace chant (or a demo marching song) and a Brucie Springsteen number".

The B-side is a cover of Bob Dylan's "I Shall Be Released" which Robinson performed many times, including as part of the supergroup "The Secret Police" at The Secret Policeman's Ball in 1979. The track was part of the Free George Ince Campaign and a photo of Ince captioned with the campaign name is featured on the record sleeve's reverse side.

It was released in Europe, reaching No. 1 in Sweden on 27 January 1978, and staying at the top for 4 weeks, while in the US (Harvest 4533) has "2-4-6-8" on both sides. It was re-released on Old Gold in 1983 and on EMI in 1987, including a 12" version.

The song also reached No. 13 on the Australian Singles Chart in early 1978.

"2-4-6-8 Motorway" was not issued on a UK studio album at the time of its release. The band omitted both "2-4-6-8 Motorway" and "Glad to Be Gay" from the UK pressing of their debut album Power in the Darkness, although both songs appeared on a 12-inch bonus record included with the US release.

The song has subsequently appeared on numerous compilation albums, including Rising Free (1980), The Collection (1987), Last Tango, Midnight at the Fringe (1988), Winter of '89 (1992), Home from Home (1999) and Tom Robinson Band The Anthology 1977–1979. It also appeared on No Thanks! The '70s Punk Rebellion (2003), and is still a part of Robinson's live set.

== Charts ==
Chart (1978)	Peak position
Australia (Kent Music Report)	13
United Kingdom (Official Charts Company)	5

=== Covers ===
The song has been covered by several bands, including:-

- Showaddywaddy: I Love Rock 'n' Roll (2006)
- Trucks: Juice (2003)
- Peter Stampfel: Peter Stampfel's 20th Century in 100 Songs (2021)

== Personnel ==
- Tom Robinson – vocals, bass
- Danny Kustow – guitar
- Mark Ambler – organ, piano
- Dolphin Taylor – drums
- Vic Maile – producer
