= Ian Parker (keyboardist) =

Musical artist (born 1953)

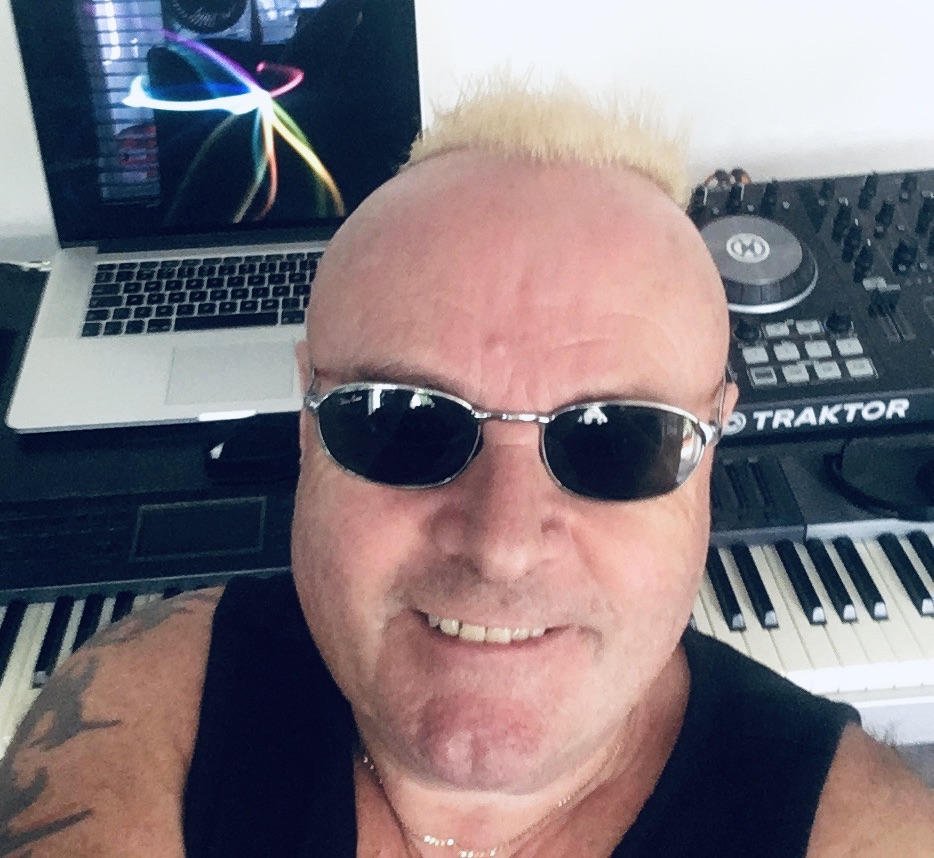

Background information
- Born: 26 November 1953 (age 72); Irvine, North Ayrshire, Scotland
- Genres: Pop; pop rock; electronica
- Occupation: Musician
- Instrument: Keyboards
- Years active: 1969–present
- Member of: The Hollies
- Website: www.ianparkermusic.net

Ian Parker (born 26 November 1953) is a Scottish keyboardist, vocalist, composer, DJ and producer.

Ian has played keyboards with The Hollies since 1991 and with Clannad from 1988 to 2016, extensively touring the world and recording with both bands. He has also played with Elkie Brooks, Joan Armatrading, Killing Joke, Tom Robinson Band, Three Degrees, Moya Brennan, Samantha Fox, Mud, Peter Gabriel, Elton John, Phil Collins, Killer B's, Gloria Gaynor, Katrina and the Waves, Chuck Berry, the Nolans, Wall Street Crash, and the Platters, and has been musical director for the Drifters, Del Shannon, Percy Sledge and the Chi-Lites.

== Early life ==
Ian Parker was born on 26 November 1953 in the coastal town of Irvine, Ayrshire to David and Anne Parker. He showed a natural ability to play the piano from a very early age and started piano lessons when he was seven. His early influences were The Beatles, The Rolling Stones, Stax and Atlantic Soul. In 1969 he started playing with the Ravenspark Academy school rock band "Timor Mortis" performing covers of such artistes as Deep Purple, Cream and Black Sabbath. Other members of the band were Andy Baird vocals, Alan Aitken guitar, Davie Stafford bass and Alistair 'Mub' McKinnon drums. This led to him forming a gigging band, which was originally called 'Tight Express' and also had Alan Aitken and Mub McKinnon as its members. This band later expanded to a four-piece with Leo Bigham joining on bass and vocals and became 'The Duck', playing clubs and pubs. The line up now was Ian Parker keyboards and vocals, Alan Aitken guitar, Mub McKinnon drums, and Leo Bigham bass and vocals. Later when Ian left to move to London, Aitken, Bigham and McKinnon formed the band Joe Lethal.

He attended the Royal Scottish Academy of Music and Drama in Glasgow between 1972 and 1975 and obtained D.R.S.A.M. qualifications. He then moved down to London where he played with the house band at the Hammersmith Palais. This led to him joining the Tom Robinson Band where he was a member 1979–81. He appears on the album TRB Two (1979), performing lead vocals on one track ("Law and Order"). From 1983 to 1984 he played with The Three Degrees, followed by Killer B's (1985–87).

== Solo work ==
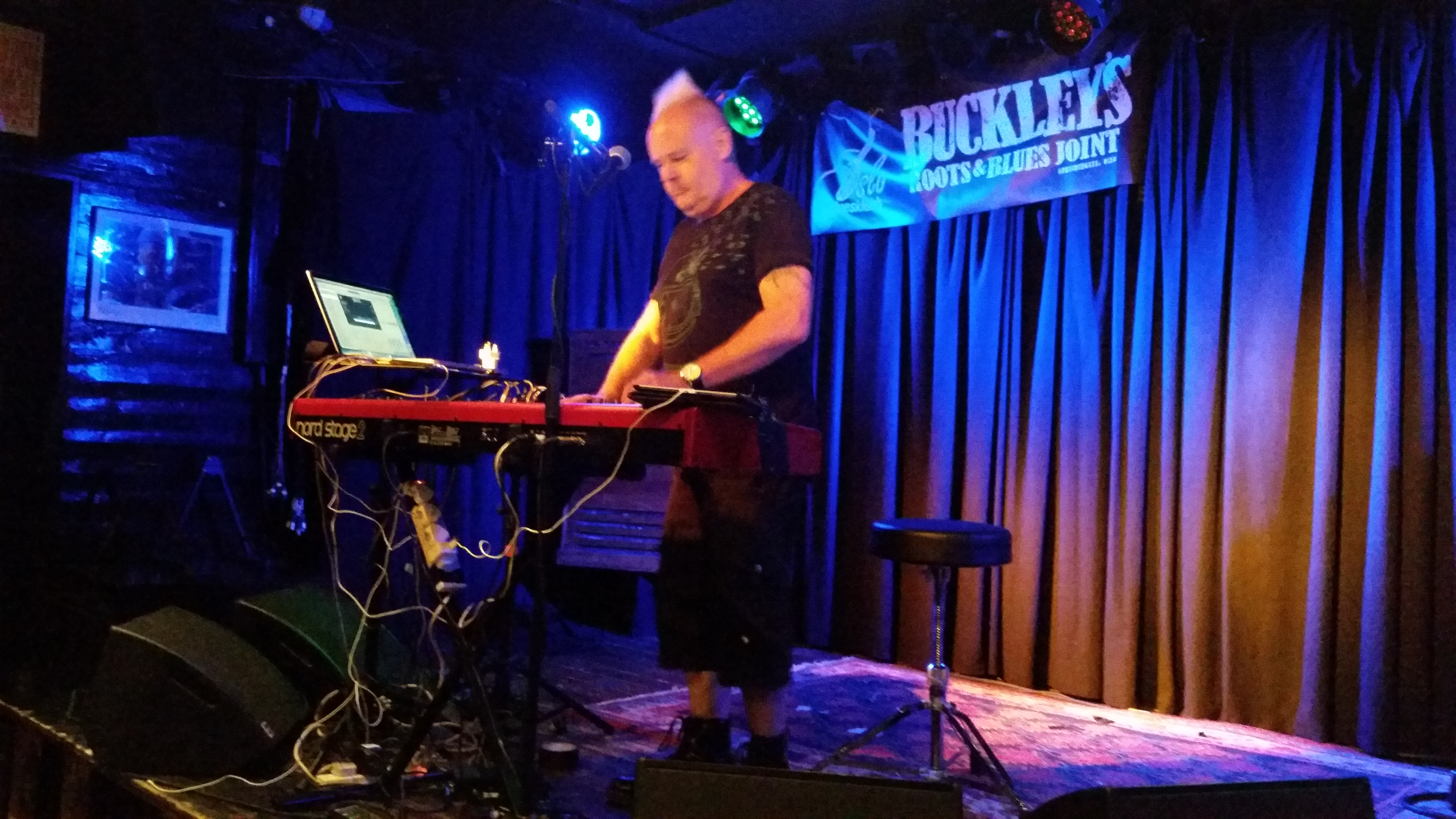
Ian Parker live at Buckley's Oslo

He has written and recorded three solo albums Naked Dance (2022),Pacifica (2015) and Count The Waves (1996). Pacifica is in the electronica music style, but also with vocal contributions from Peter Howarth. On Count The Waves, Hollies lead guitarist Tony Hicks contributes as co-composer and with harmony vocals and guitar. Ian Parker and Ray Stiles (Hollies bass player) were the major artists behind the album Celtic (1999).

== Composing and production ==
He has written or co-written songs featured on the recordings Ian Parker Naked Dance (2022), Pacifica (2015), Various Artists Celtic (1999), Ian Parker Count The Waves (1996), Maire – Maire Brennan (1992): No Easy Way and Voices of the Land, Tom Robinson Band TRB Two (1979): "All Right All Night" and "Crossing Over The Road".

He co-produced with Ray Stiles the 2006 Hollies recording Staying Power.

He composed all the music for the Granada TV series Dominatrix Re-loaded (2004) and for the short film Dial M for Mistress shown at the Raindance Film Festival Soho London (2005). His TV appearances include the Jay Leno Show with Clannad, David Letterman Show with Joan Armatrading, Later with Jools Holland with Clannad, and Top of the Pops with the Tom Robinson Band.

== In The Hollies ==
He has been a permanent member of the group, touring worldwide since 1991. He has played on all their subsequent recordings including Hollies Live Hits ( 2013), Hollies Midas Touch (2010), Then Now Always The Hollies (2009), Staying Power – The Hollies (2006), Peggy Sue Got Married (Not Fade Away) – Buddy Holly and The Hollies (1996).

== In Clannad ==
Ian joined Irish folk rock group Clannad in 1988 as a touring member, but has since then also contributed to many of their recordings. This includes Christ Church Cathedral (2013), The Essential Clannad (2012), Clannad: Live in Concert (2005), Landmarks (1998)(this album received a Grammy Award), Lore (1996), Banba (1993), Anam (1991), Past Present(1989).

== See also ==
- Category:Songs written by Ian Parker (keyboardist)
