= Power in the Darkness =

Studio album by Tom Robinson Band
- Released: 1978
- Recorded: 1978
- Studios: Wessex, London
- Genres: Pub rock; punk rock; hard rock
- Length: 38:35 (original); 68:52 (2004 reissue)
- Label: EMI EMC 3226
- Producers: Chris Thomas, Vic Maile on "2-4-6-8 Motorway"

Tom Robinson Band chronology
Power in the Darkness (1978)	TRB Two (1979)

Power in the Darkness is the debut studio album by English punk band Tom Robinson Band, released in early 1978. The UK LP had ten tracks. It included inside the album cover a stencil similar to the cover art, but with the album title replaced by "Tom Robinson Band"; it held the warning, "This stencil is not meant for spraying on public property!!!" The US release was packaged with a seven-track bonus LP. The record sleeve of the bonus LP included the number to the Gay & Lesbian Switchboard of New York. The 1993 CD re-release included all 17 tracks. Two more tracks were included on a 2004 re-release. After TRB guitarist Danny Kustow's death in 2019, Robinson frequently dedicated "Too Good to Be True" to him.

== Sleeve notes ==
The sleeve notes of Power in the Darkness included the founding declaration of the Rock Against Racism movement.

== Reception ==
Professional ratings
Review scores
Source	Rating
AllMusic	4.5/5 stars
Christgau's Record Guide	A−
The Rolling Stone Record Guide	4/5 stars

Ralph Heibutzki of AllMusic retrospectively raved about Power in the Darkness, calling the record's consistency "remarkable", and quipping, "Think music and politics don't mix? Listen to this album, and then decide."

== Track listing ==
All tracks composed by Tom Robinson; except where indicated

Original vinyl release (UK)

Side one

1. "Up Against the Wall" (Robinson, Roy Butterfield aka Anton Mauve) – 3:35
2. "Grey Cortina" – 2:10
3. "Too Good to Be True" (Robinson, Dolphin Taylor) – 3:35
4. "Ain't Gonna Take It" (Robinson, Danny Kustow) – 2:53
5. "Long Hot Summer" – 4:44

Side two

1. "The Winter of '79" (Robinson, Mark Ambler, Taylor, Kustow) – 4:31
2. "Man You Never Saw" (Robinson, Ambler) – 2:44
3. "Better Decide Which Side You're On" – 2:50
4. "You Gotta Survive" (Robinson, Ambler) – 3:15
5. "Power in the Darkness" (Robinson, Ambler) – 4:55

Bonus tracks

1. "2-4-6-8 Motorway" – 3:18
2. "I Shall Be Released" (Bob Dylan) – 4:35
3. "(Sing If You're) Glad to Be Gay" – 5:00
4. "Don't Take No for an Answer" – 4:35
5. "Martin" – 2:53
6. "Right On Sister" (Robinson, Kustow, Butterfield, Taylor) – 3:25
7. "I'm All Right Jack" (Robinson, Kustow) – 2:29
8. "I'm Waiting for My Man"† (Live at the London Lyceum, 1977) (Lou Reed) – 4:25
9. "Power in the Darkness"† (2004 Remix) – 3:23

† These two tracks were included in a digitally remastered, Copy Controlled 2004 re-release.

== Charts ==
Chart (1978)	Peak position
Australia (Kent Music Report)	52
United Kingdom (Official Charts Company)	4
United States (Billboard 200)	144

== Personnel ==
Tom Robinson Band

- Tom Robinson – vocals, bass
- Danny Kustow – guitar
- Mark Ambler – organ, piano
- Dolphin Taylor – drums

Technical

- Bill Price – engineer
- Jerry Green – assistant engineer
- Brian Palmer – art direction
- Terry O'Neill, Peter Vernon – photography
