= Bradbray Apartment =

- Origin: Stafford, Staffordshire, England
- Genres: Post-punk, alternative rock, indie rock
- Years active: 1987–1990; 2014–present
- Labels: Tubecroft Records; Own label
- Members: Matt Collins – Vocals; Jim Allen – Keyboards; Bill Scroggs – Bass; Steve Follows – Guitar; Liam Collins – Drums
- Past members: Scott Sinfield – Guitar Mark Gear – Drums; Rob Wild – Drums
- Website: http://www.bradbrayapartment.co.uk

Bradbray Apartment is an English band originally formed in Stafford, England, in 1987.

Also known by their fans as "The Brads", the band are known for their unique mix of post-punk power along with vintage synths with big catchy choruses and a steady thumping rhythm section. Having separated in late 1989, the band reformed in the summer of 2014 after a local newspaper ran a 25th anniversary piece on their 1989 gig at Covent Garden in London. This prompted the lead singer to get in touch with his old bandmates which led to the reformation.

== Band lineup ==
Original band lineup in 1987:

- Matt Collins, vocals
- Jim Allen, keyboards
- Bill Scroggs, bass
- Scott Sinfield, guitar

=== 1988 ===
- Scott Sinfield, guitar, left the band due to other commitments; replaced by
- Steve Follows

=== 1989 ===
- Mark Gear

=== 2014 ===
- Mark Gear, drums, left the band due to other commitments; replaced by
- Rob Wild

=== 2018 ===
- Rob Wild, drums; left band late 2017, replaced by
- Liam Collins

== Recordings and track releases ==
- Who Needs Einstein EP (Tubecroft Records) September 1989
1. "Reach for the Sky"
2. "Running"
3. "Shadowfall"
4. "Hollow of the Mind"

recorded at The Cottage recording studio Macclesfield

- Theory of Relativity EP (Own Label) April 2016
1. "Another You"
2. "Endgame"
3. "Don't Wanna Lose You"
4. "Into the Cold"

recorded at Prism recording studio Stoke-on-Trent
