= TRB Two =

Studio album by Tom Robinson Band
- Released: March 1979
- Recorded: 13–19 December 1978
- Studios: Pye, London
- Genres: Punk rock; rock
- Length: 39:41
- Labels: Razor & Tie; EMI
- Producer: Todd Rundgren

Tom Robinson Band chronology
Power in the Darkness (1978)	TRB Two (1979)	Tom Robinson Band (1981)

TRB Two – also known as TRB2 – is the second studio album by Tom Robinson Band. It was recorded days after the original drummer, Dolphin Taylor, left the band. The TRB disbanded four months after its release. Steve Ridgeway designed the cover.

== Songs ==
The album was dedicated to Mrs. Mary Towers, the mother of Liddle Towers. Liddle Towers was an amateur boxer who had died in police custody in 1976 – his case was the subject of "Blue Murder".

"Black Angel" was originally recorded as "Sweet Black Angel" by Robinson's first band, Café Society, on their self-titled debut album in 1975. "Law and Order" was co-written by Nick Plytas who joined the TRB as a temporary keyboard player from April to July 1978.

Robinson and Danny Kustow believe "Bully for You" inspired " Another Brick in the Wall Part 2" by Pink Floyd, with whom the band shared a manager and label. "There's no question [the song's repeated] 'We don't need no aggravation' was in the air around [Floyd lyricist] Roger Waters", said the former. "The truth of it is that I had a really good idea for a chorus and we didn't make the most of it. If 'Bully for You' had started with, 'We don't need no aggravation,' how much better would it have been? Roger's skills as a writer were far more developed than my own. He put a great idea to better use, so fair play to him."

== Reception ==
Professional ratings
Review scores
Source	Rating
AllMusic	3/5 stars
Christgau's Record Guide	A−
Music Week	4/4 stars
Smash Hits	8/10

Smash Hits said, "This is far superior to the last album and the TRB are developing into a very fine rock band. This album captures more of their live power, but the increasing sophistication of the songs means less immediate impact." The Globe and Mail determined that "Robinson succeeds in sounding like a parody of himself as he sings in a Monty Python–esque voice and clutters the album with Gospel singers and synthesizers."

== Track listing ==
All tracks composed by Tom Robinson; except where indicated

1. "All Right All Night" (Robinson, Danny Kustow, Dolphin Taylor, Ian Parker) – 2:59
2. "Why Should I Mind" (Robinson, Danny Kustow) – 3:01
3. "Black Angel" – 4:02
4. "Let My People Be" – 4:07
5. "Blue Murder" – 5:02
6. "Bully for You" (music: Peter Gabriel; lyrics: Robinson) – 3:20
7. "Crossing over the Road" (Robinson, Danny Kustow, Ian Parker) – 3:39
8. "Sorry Mr. Harris" – 2:43
9. "Law and Order" (music: Robinson, Nick Plytas, Taylor; lyrics: Robinson, Dolphin Taylor) – 2:35
10. "Days of Rage" (Robinson, Dolphin Taylor) – 3:33
11. "Hold Out" – 4:10

== Charts ==
Chart (1979)	Peak position
United Kingdom (Official Charts Company)	18
United States (Billboard 200)	163

== Personnel ==
Tom Robinson Band

- Tom Robinson – vocals, bass
- Danny Kustow – guitar, backing vocals
- Ian "Quince" Parker – keyboards; vocals on "Law & Order"
- Preston Heyman – drums, triangle, backing vocals

with:

- Carol Grimes, Kasim Sulton, Niamh Chambers, Barry St. John – backing "high" vocals

Technical

- Bill Price – preparation
- Paul Libsom, Tom Edmonds – engineer
- Julie Harris, Steve Ridgeway – cover design
