= Owd Grandad Piggott =

Fictional character

Owd Grandad Piggott is a fictional character created in 1970 by author Alan Povey, based on a real-life person. The Owd Grandad Piggott stories are best known in Povey's home town of Stoke-on-Trent where they have often been heard on BBC Radio Stoke, read by the author. Owd Grandad Piggott is noted for having a broad Staffordshire accent and speaks in an old Potteries dialect. The stories are mostly set in the 1950s when the pottery industry was still at large.

== Life ==
Owd Grandad Piggott was born and bred in Longton, one of the six towns of Stoke-on-Trent famous for its many pot banks but also considerable poverty.

In the Owd Grandad Piggott stories he lives in a terraced house in Longton with his long suffering wife and is the next door neighbour of the author. His neighbours on the other side are Percy and Lizzy Lockett. Most of his days are spent in his local pub owned by Tommy Dawkins or, on the many occasions that he is ejected from here, the many pubs and bookmakers in and around the Longton area.

== Character ==
Owd Grandad is hardly a savoury character. By appearance he is scruffy and unkempt, often wearing a tatty trenchcoat and has little pride in his general appearance and manners. In one story he appears in the pub with a large blob of lard on his shirt but refuses to wipe it off preferring to leave it "until it goes hard then it will chip off". He is rather crafty in nature; always up for trying easier ways to make money. His skills in talking himself out of situations usually involving the police leave a lot to be desired. He uses phrases such as "it might have looked like me but it wasn't, I've got 6 brothers and they all look like me" or tries to warn off police officers by saying "ay up, I've got a disease!".

Despite his many brushes with the law Owd Grandad can hardly be called a hardened criminal. His arrests and fines are always for minor breaches of the law such as breaching the peace or being drunk and disorderly.

== Relationship with his wife ==
Owd Grandad Piggott's relationship with his wife is hardly peaceful with their many arguments and rows being somewhat of a trademark for many of the stories. Though they have been married for over 30 years, over that time Grandma Piggott (as his wife is known) has had to suffer almost constant physical and verbal abuse from her husband. Often this is a result of Owd Grandad's alcoholism. However, she often gives as good as she gets with instances of her throwing a carving knife at her husband and has allegedly, according to Owd Grandad, tried to poison him in the past. Despite all of this there is only one instance in all of the stories of Grandma Piggott actually walking out on him. That coming after a row involving a sledgehammer shaft.

== Friends of Owd Grandad ==
Club-Paper Jack

An old friend of Owd Grandad Piggot who is described as a man who would "do anything for money but work". The nickname "Club-Paper" refers to papers which medically exempt a person from work. Presumably Jack uses these as a means to avoid work. He appears rather notorious wearing an eyepatch and a filthy Tam and has a cunning nature always being able to find ways to capitalise on situations to his benefit if not always being able to bring his plans to fruition. He is the mastermind behind the "great chewing gum robbery". He is an animal enthusiast and owns racing pigeons, whippets and ferrets.

Billy Drummund

Billy is another of the group of friends from Tommy Dawkins's pub. He is described as being "as honest as Legs Diamond" and has a particular talent for being able to acquire lead for sale by fair means or foul. He is another dog enthusiast owning a dog described as "a cross between a boxer and a carthorse".

The Author

The Author of the stories is not necessarily a friend of Owd Grandad but is his next door neighbour and often steps in to make Owd Grandad see sense in his misadventures. He does not particularly like Owd Grandad as a person but generally gets along with him despite him stealing money from his house. On one such occasion, the author is anxious to catch up with Owd Grandad before he can get to the pub, as 'Owd Grandad could turn money into liquid faster than a petrol pump.'

== Notable adventures ==
The stories focus mainly on Owd Grandad's life as an old age pensioner and include him and his many friends.

The Great Chewing Gum Robbery

Owd Grandad and Club-Paper Jack (Owd Grandad's friend who has never done an honest day's work in his life) plan what they call a "big job" after being inspired by the Great Train Robbery. After careful thought and planning, Jack and Owd Grandad plan to break into a chewing gum machine on the wall of a tobacconist's warehouse. Jack had seen many children purchasing chewing gum drawing the conclusion that the machine must be full of money. They discover that the machine in fact contains only 7 pence and are arrested following an alarm being triggered overhead. It is revealed, however, that the alarm was not in fact triggered by them but by burglars in the warehouse itself who got away with over £1000 worth of cigars.

The excursion to London

Owd Grandad goes on a trip to London organised by Tommy Dawkins for his regulars. While on the trip he upsets another man by spitting a cherry stone in his ear upsetting his hearing-aid. On the coach home, after Owd Grandad had been drinking excessively, he falls asleep without going to the toilet before the 200-mile journey. After waking up while the coach was on the M1 motorway he realises that he needs to urinate and hassles the driver to leave the motorway. The driver eventually stops the coach by a wall on a country road and Owd Grandad runs up and jumps over it only to discover that it was, in fact, a canal bridge and plunges into the water below. He is, however, okay and gets back on the bus after a verbal assault directed at the driver. Despite his clothes being soaked in mud he decides not to take a bath until he notices that nobody will stand near him at the bar.

Owd Grandad and Club-Paper Jack Brew Ale

Owd Grandad discovers, to his horror, that the price of beer has been raised from 1 shilling to 1 and a penny. Outraged, he decides to contact Club-Paper Jack to borrow his book about brewing. Jack, sensing money in the venture, decides to join in. They acquire and mix the ingredients in Owd Grandad's kitchen producing a foul smell in the process. They then leave it to brew in Jack's pigeon coop for over a week, during this time the pigeons decide to roost elsewhere rather than suffer the smell of the concoction. After a week Jack and Owd Grandad return to find their brew (to which much corn and pigeon droppings as well as 3 house bricks thrown in by Jack's grandson had been added) had turned into a disgusting grey slop. Despite this they decide to sell the ale for sixpence a pint after adding some brown shoe dye to the mix. They manage to sell it all with the expense of nearly the whole town contracting dysentery.
