= Love over Rage =

Studio album by Tom Robinson
- Released: 1994
- Label: Cooking Vinyl
- Producer: Al Scott

Tom Robinson chronology
Living in a Boom Time (1992)	Love over Rage (1994)	Having It Both Ways (1996)

Love over Rage is an album by the English musician Tom Robinson, released in 1994. It is dedicated to Dez Tozer, a former lover. Robinson promoted the album by playing the 1994 Glastonbury Festival and embarking on a North American tour that included shows with Barenaked Ladies. The first single was "Hard".

== Production ==
Robinson used studio musicians as a backing band. Chris Rea contributed to the album. "Green" criticizes corporations that use environmental oratory to draw attention from the polluting effects of business. "DDR" describes life in the former East Germany. "Days" looks back on the music of Robinson's young manhood. "Chance" and "Silence" examine the AIDS epidemic.

== Critical reception ==
Professional ratings
Review scores
Source	Rating
AllMusic	3/5 stars
Robert Christgau	(choice cut)
Derby Evening Telegraph	7/10
The Encyclopedia of Popular Music	4/5 stars
MusicHound Folk: The Essential Album Guide	3/5 stars

Trouser Press wrote that "Robinson can still sound preachy, but overall this is a stunningly mature work." The Philadelphia Daily News deemed the album "a punchy, provocative grouping of rock anthems, the sort only Brits seem capable of writing." The Boston Globe called it "catchy, soulful and still politically charged." The Age noted that Robinson shows "enough self-deprecating humor, wry observation and the ability to pen the occasional catchy melody."

Robert Christgau praised "Fifty" and "Green". The New York Times concluded that "the songs on Love over Rage may be more complex and personal than the moralizing of Mr. Robinson's early recordings, but they are no less passionate in their search for truth." The Washington Post opined that "the liveliest track is the lite-reggae "Loved", a bouncy pitch for no-strings lust."

== Track listing ==
No.	Title	Length
1.	"Roaring"
2.	"Hard"
3.	"Loved"
4.	"Days"
5.	"Driving"
6.	"Green"
7.	"DDR"
8.	"Fifty"
9.	"Silence"
10.	"Chance"
