= Hope and Glory (album) =

Studio album by Tom Robinson
- Released: 1984
- Studios: Power Plant (London); Redan Recorders (London); Windmill Lane (Dublin)
- Genre: Rock
- Length: 41:16
- Labels: Castaway; Geffen
- Producers: Robin Millar, Tom Robinson

Tom Robinson chronology
Atmospherics EP (1983)	Hope and Glory (1984)	Still Loving You (1986)

Hope and Glory is an album by the British musician Tom Robinson. It was released in 1984.

The album peaked at No. 21 on the UK Albums Chart. It contained three charting singles. Hope and Glory was a commercial failure in the United States; it would be 10 years before Robinson released another album in the U.S.

== Production ==
The album was produced by Robin Millar and Tom Robinson. "Rikki Don't Lose That Number" is a cover of the Steely Dan song. "Atmospherics: Listen to the Radio" was written with Peter Gabriel.

== Critical reception ==
Professional ratings
Review scores
Source	Rating
AllMusic	3/5 stars
Robert Christgau	B+
The Encyclopedia of Popular Music	3/5 stars
MusicHound Rock: The Essential Album Guide	1.5/5 stars

Robert Christgau thought that "'War Baby' is a wrenching triumph and 'Rikki Don't Lose That Number' a great moment in gay liberation." Trouser Press concluded that, "with the exception of 'Cabin Boy', a bouncy bit of gay double entendre, the best tracks are redone Sector 27 tunes." The Wall Street Journal opined that "the record offers some first-rate material—particularly the wistful 'Atmospherics'—all delivered with Mr. Robinson's warm, throaty voice."

The Washington Post wrote that Hope and Glory "treats gay life to the sort of love songs heterosexual romance has enjoyed for centuries... In a sense, the most exceptional thing about these songs is how mundane they seem." The Globe and Mail likened the sound of the album to soul music, writing that "lots of jagged edges, spluttering saxophones, and dated production techniques ... enhance the rough-and-tumble arrangements, melodramatic poetry, and a constant edge of drive and anguish in Robinson's uneven, sore-throat vocal style."

The Boston Globe listed the album among the best albums of 1984, calling it "a shamefully overlooked album by the gay British singer who has become an intelligent rocker of the first rank." Newsday considered Hope and Glory to be the fifth best album of 1985.

AllMusic deemed the album "a politically tinged but mostly mainstream rock record."

== Track listing ==
All tracks are written by Tom Robinson; except where noted.

No.	Title	Writer(s)	Length
1.	"Murder at the End of the Day"		4:55
2.	"Prison"		4:12
3.	"Rikki Don't Lose That Number"	Walter Becker, Donald Fagen	3:52
4.	"Old Friend"		4:15
5.	"Looking for a Bonfire"		3:29
6.	"War Baby"		4:11
7.	"Atmospherics: Listen to the Radio"	Tom Robinson, Peter Gabriel	3:43
8.	"Cabin Boy"		3:28
9.	"Blond and Blue"		3:50
10.	"Hope and Glory"		5:21

== Personnel ==
- Tom Robinson – vocals, bass, keyboards
- Danny Kustow, Paul Harvey, Pete Glenister, Robin Millar, Deezal Martin – guitar
- Felix Krish, David H. Smith, Simon Skinner, Pat Davey – bass
- Danny Shogga, Sean Mayes, John "Rabbit" Bundrick – keyboards
- Steve Laurie – drums
- Martin Ditcham – percussion
- Bimbo Acock, Mark Ramsden, Iain Ballamy – saxophone
- Guy Barker – trumpet
- Paul Jones – harmonica
- Ebo Ross, Marsha Hunt – backing vocals
