= Funday Times =

Section of the UK Sunday Times newspaper (1989–2006)

The Funday Times
- Format: Weekly
- Publisher: The Sunday Times
- Founded: 1989; 37 years ago
- Ceased publication: 12 March 2006 (website closed down on 5 January 2007)

The Funday Times was a section of the UK Sunday Times. It was intended mainly for children, and included several comic strips, Launched in 1989, it originally featured adult cartoons like Modesty Blaise but quickly dropped them in favour of more child-friendly fare such as Asterix.

It also included reviews of various toys and songs, interviews with celebrities, including Will Smith, Gail Emms and Matt Groening, and interesting events coming up during the week.

== History ==
The Funday Times website was established on 3 September 1997, and closed down on 5 January 2007.

The last printed edition of the Funday Times was published on Sunday 12 March 2006. After that date, it was only available online. The print edition of the Funday Times ran for nearly 20 years before it was discontinued. The website mostly concentrated on features and games, although there were comic strips on the website that were originally in the printed version.

The Funday Times returned for a one-off special on 1 April 2011 to promote the Rio movie. Since then, the section has returned sporadically with themed issues to promote newly released children's films.

== Strips ==
- Beryl the Peril
- Creature Feature
- Dennis and Gnasher
- Fans Utd.
- The Flintstones
- Goosebumps
- Jarvis
- Newton's Law
- The Powerpuff Girls
- Rex and Tex
- Robot Crusoe
- Scooby-Doo
- Space Raoul
- The Simpsons
- Squirt

== Editorial team ==
The final editorial team responsible for The Funday Times consisted of:

- Dave Coombs – Editor.
- Paul Wray – Deputy Editor.
- Claire Sheldon – Funday Picture Editor.
- Ed White – Funday Art Editor.

Margot Wilson of TV's Hartbeat was a former editor.
