= Sector 27 =

English new wave band (1979–1985)

Background information
- Origin: London, England
- Genres: New wave
- Years active: 1979–1985
- Labels: Panic, Fontana, I.R.S., Rocket
- Past members: Tom Robinson; Stevie Blanchard; Jo Burt; Derek Quinton

Sector 27 were an English new wave band founded in 1979 by Tom Robinson. Their 1980 debut album, Sector 27, was produced by Steve Lillywhite. Robinson subsequently left the band, and the band continued without him for a number of years. Sector 27 toured with Elton John and The Police.

== History ==
Tom Robinson formed the band in late 1979 as an effort to begin a new direction. The band made their debut in Liverpool on 11 January 1980. The band released their first records on their own label, Panic Records. Later releases were on Fontana Records, with releases in the US on I.R.S. Records. The first album was produced by Steve Lillywhite.

After Robinson and Derek Quinton had left, the band released two singles on Rocket Records: "Excalibur" (1984), produced by Phil Harding, and "Conversation" (1985), produced by Chris Thomas.

== Personnel ==
- Tom Robinson - vocals, guitar
- Stevie B. (Blanchard) - guitar, vocals
- Jo Burt - bass, vocals
- Derek Quinton - drums
- Martin "Red" Broad - drums (1984, after Robinson and Quinton had left)

== Discography ==
=== Albums ===
Sector 27

Studio album by Sector 27
- Released: November 1980
- Recorded: March – April 1980
- Studios: Redan Recorders, Queensway, London
- Length: 43:03 (UK release); 46:01 (US release)
- Labels: Fontana 6359 039; I.R.S. Records CS-70013
- Producer: Steve Lillywhite

Professional ratings
Review scores
Source	Rating
AllMusic	3/5 stars
Robert Christgau	A
Smash Hits	7/10

Sector 27 was the band's only album release. It was critically well-received; but had little commercial success, even though it got airplay on more than 60 U.S. radio stations. It was re-released in 1996 with additional tracks under the title Sector 27 Complete.

Side1
No.	Title	Writer(s)	Length
1.	"Invitation: What Have We Got to Lose?"	Robinson	4:56
2.	"Not Ready"	Robinson	4:17
3.	"Mary Lynne"	Burt, Robinson	4:36
4.	"Looking at You"	Burt, Robinson	3:29
5.	"Five Two Five"	Blanchard, Burt, Robinson	5:15

Side2
No.	Title	Writer(s)	Length
1.	"Total Recall"	Burt, Robinson	4:10
2.	"Where Can We Go Tonight?"	Blanchard, Burt, Robinson	3:18
3.	"Take or Leave It"	Burt, Robinson	4:23
4.	"Bitterly Disappointed"	Blanchard, Burt, Robinson	4:14
5.	"One Fine Day"	Burt, Robinson	4:25
6.	"Can't Keep Away" (US only)	Burt, Blanchard, Robinson	2:58

1996 additional tracks
No.	Title	Writer(s)	Length
1.	"Stornoway" (narrated by Derek Quinton)	Blanchard, Robinson	4:17
2.	"Dungannon"	Blanchard, Robinson	2:46
3.	"Day After Day"		3:48
4.	"Won't You Tell Me How I Feel"		2:32
5.	"Martin's Gone"	Robinson	2:19
6.	"Christopher Calling"	Burt	3:27
7.	"Shutdown"		3:45
8.	"Out in the Cold Again"		3:34

=== Singles ===
- July 1980 – "Not Ready" / "Can't Keep Away" - UK Indie no. 4
- October 1980 – "Invitation: What Have We Got to Lose?" / "Dungannon"
- January 1981 – "Total Recall" / "Stornoway"
- May 1981 – "Martin's Gone" / "Christopher Calling" produced by Richard Strange
- 1984 – "Excalibur" / "How I Feel"
- 1984 – "Excalibur" / "How I Feel" / "Christopher Calling"
- 1985 – "Conversation" / "How I Feel"

== Sources ==
- Strong, Martin Charles. The Great Indie Discography. Canongate U.S., 2003, ISBN 9781841953359
- Gimarc, George. Punk diary: the Ultimate Trainspotter's Guide to Underground Rock, 1970–1982, Backbeat Books, 2006, ISBN 978-0879308483
- Gimarc, George. Post Punk Diary: 1980–1982, St. Martin's Press, 1997, ISBN 978-0312169688
- Swenson, John. The Year in Rock, 1981–82, Delilah Books, 1981, ISBN 9780933328099
