= Glad to Be Gay =

Song by Tom Robinson Band

from the album Rising Free
- Released: February 1978
- Genre: Folk punk
- Length: 5:04
- Label: EMI
- Songwriter: Tom Robinson

"Glad to Be Gay" is a song by the British punk rock/new wave group Tom Robinson Band. It is one of their defining songs, and has been considered Britain's national gay anthem.

== Song information ==
The song was originally written by Tom Robinson for a London gay pride parade in 1976, inspired by the directness and confrontational style of the Sex Pistols. An out gay singer, he subsequently formed the Tom Robinson Band with three straight musicians.

Robinson said he wrote the song to the tune of "Sara" by Bob Dylan: "But I realised I couldn't rip off Dylan, so I wrote new music, added the chorus and gave it that more upbeat swing."

"Glad to Be Gay" is built on four verses criticising British society's attitudes towards gay people. The first verse criticises the British police for raiding gay pubs for no reason after the decriminalisation of homosexuality by the 1967 Sexual Offences Act.

The second verse points to the hypocrisy of Gay News being prosecuted for obscenity instead of magazines like Playboy or the tabloid newspaper The Sun, which published photographs of topless girls on Page 3. It also criticises the way homosexual people are portrayed in other parts of the press, especially in the newspapers Daily Telegraph, Sunday People and Sunday Express. The third verse points out the extreme consequences of homophobia, such as violence against gay people.

In the final verse, the song makes a plea for support of the gay cause. This part, originally intended as a bitter attack on complacency of gay people at the Pride march in 1976, became a rallying call for solidarity from people irrespective of their orientation.

== Release and reception ==
"Glad to Be Gay" was originally released in February 1978 on the band's live EP Rising Free. The EP reached No. 18 on the UK Singles Chart, after the band's initial success with the single "2-4-6-8 Motorway", which peaked at No. 5. At that time, EPs were also eligible to chart on the OCC singles chart.

Although "Glad to Be Gay" became the most popular track from the EP, BBC Radio 1 refused to broadcast the song on its Top 40 chart show, choosing the less controversial opening track "Don't Take No for an Answer" instead. Even though the Chart Show would not play it, John Peel did broadcast the track. On the rival station Capital Radio, the song reached No. 1 on the listener-voted Hitline chart for six consecutive weeks.

It was subsequently featured on the American pressing of the band's debut album Power in the Darkness in May 1978, and the 2004 UK reissue of the album.

Chart (1978)	Peak position
UK Singles Chart	18

== Notable performances and cover versions ==
Over the course of his solo career, Tom Robinson has performed the song with its lyric updated to reflect current events. There have been ten versions officially released. Later lyrics addressed AIDS ("The message is simple and obvious, please – just lay off the patients and let's fight the disease"), and extended attacks on the tabloid press.

From 1996, it also addressed what Robinson calls his 'late onset bisexuality'.

The 6 November 1977, episode of Granada Television's So It Goes featured a live performance of the song by the Tom Robinson Band.

In 1979, Tom Robinson performed at the Secret Policeman's Ball, a benefit concert staged by the British section of Amnesty International to raise funds for its research and campaign work in the human rights arena. For this performance he reinstated a verse about Peter Wells not used since the original demo. Wells was a young man, later shot dead, who had been imprisoned for 2 1/2 years for sex with an 18-year-old man. Had his partner been a woman it would have been legal, but the gay age of consent was 21 as opposed to 16 for heterosexuals. Robinson sang this pointedly, as Amnesty were refusing to acknowledge gay prisoners as "political prisoners".

Queercore band Sister George covered the song – retitled "100xNo" – on their 1993 album Drag King. In 2008, the song was covered by the Finnish group Eläkeläiset.

In the last episode of the first series of the BBC One drama Ashes to Ashes, a 31-year-old fictionalised version of Tom Robinson (portrayed by Mathew Baynton) is incarcerated with several members of the Gay Liberation Front. He sings "Glad to Be Gay" in his police station cell.

== See also ==
- List of songs banned by the BBC
- Whitehouse v Lemon
