= Danny Kustow =

English rock guitarist (1955–2019)

- Kustow performing in the late 1970s
- Born: 10 May 1955; Hammersmith, London, England
- Died: 11 March 2019 (aged 63); Bath, Somerset, England
- Citizenship: British
- Occupation: Musician
- Years active: 1976–1992; 2017

Alexander Daniel Kustow (10 May 1955 – 11 March 2019) was an English rock guitarist, known for his dynamic performance style and work with the Tom Robinson Band in the 1970s and 1980s.

== Early life ==
Kustow was born at Queen Charlotte's and Chelsea Hospital in Hammersmith, London, England, on 10 May 1955, the son of Ann Kustow (née Justus) and Dr. Bernard Kustow, a physician in General Practice in the National Health Service, who had served with the British Army's Royal Army Medical Corps during World War II. He spent his childhood in Willesden, North London. After being expelled from King Alfred School in Golders Green in 1968 at the age of 13, he was sent at the age of 14 to an idiosyncratic residential educational establishment for "maladjusted" youths called Finchden Manor, in Kent, where, inspired by Jimi Hendrix he began playing the guitar and met Tom Robinson.

== Career ==
After learning to play the guitar in the early 1970s, influenced by the work of the British blues guitarists Alexis Korner and Paul Kossoff (both fellow alumni with Kustow of King Alfred School), Kustow commenced his professional career at the age of 21 in late 1976 amidst London's Punk rock scene as the guitarist of the Tom Robinson Band. Despite the band's politically radical agenda, reflected in its song-writing and activities under the influence of Robinson, Kustow's primary personal musical ambition was to be a successful rock star.

After an initial No. 5 hit in the charts with the single release "2-4-6-8 Motorway" in October 1977, the band recorded its debut long-player Power in the Darkness (1978), which on release went to No. 4 in the UK Albums Chart. On release its second long-player, entitled TRB Two (1979), reached No. 18 in the UK Albums Chart, but a declining impact of its songs in the UK Singles Chart, and an inability to creatively develop beyond the style of its opening phase led to the band breaking up in October 1979, leaving Kustow professionally cut adrift and in search of a commercially successful new act to team up with, which he failed to find.

In the early 1980s, Kustow (lead vocals, guitar) formed the trio rock band SF-GO, together with Chris Constantinou (bass, vocals), and Bogdan Wiczling (drums). The project emerged following Kustow’s tenure with Tom Robinson Band and Constantinou and Wiczling’s work with Adam Ant. The band was co-managed by Miles Copeland and Simon Astaire and recorded a series of original songs collaboratively written by all three members, while also performing live on tour. Despite recording and touring, SF-GO’s activities were curtailed due to Kustow’s personal challenges, and the band disbanded before releasing its material publicly.

In mid-1980 he tried out for the lead guitar vacancy with Gen X, recording on that band's long-player release Kiss Me Deadly (1981), but the role went to someone else. At the beginning of the 1980s he played with two short-lived acts, The Spectres, and The Planets.

In the mid-1980s he worked with Tom Robinson again on songs such as "War Baby", which on release went to No. 6 in the UK Singles Chart, and he also performed with the band Time UK. In the late 1980s, Kustow performed live with a temporarily reformed Tom Robinson Band, and played on its long-player release Winter of '89 (1992), after which he retired from professional music.

In October 2017, he came out of retirement briefly to perform the song "2-4-6-8 Motorway" during a Tom Robinson gig at London's 100 Club.

== Death ==
In his later years Kustow lived in the Somerset village of Bathford. He died of pneumonia following a liver infection at the age of 63 in the early hours of 11 March 2019 at the Royal United Hospital in Bath. His body was buried at the Old Jewish Cemetery, in Bushey, Hertfordshire, on 15 March 2019.

A memorial gig for Kustow was performed by the Tom Robinson Band and TV Smith at the Scala venue in London on the night of 29 July 2019, with profits raised from the event being donated to the Royal United Hospital, Bath.

== Equipment ==
Gibson Les Paul Standard Sunburst (1959 model), Marshall amplifier head (1975 model), Marshall 4x12 speaker cabinet.

== See also ==
- Category:Songs written by Danny Kustow
