= Tom Robinson =

English musician, activist and radio presenter (born 1950)

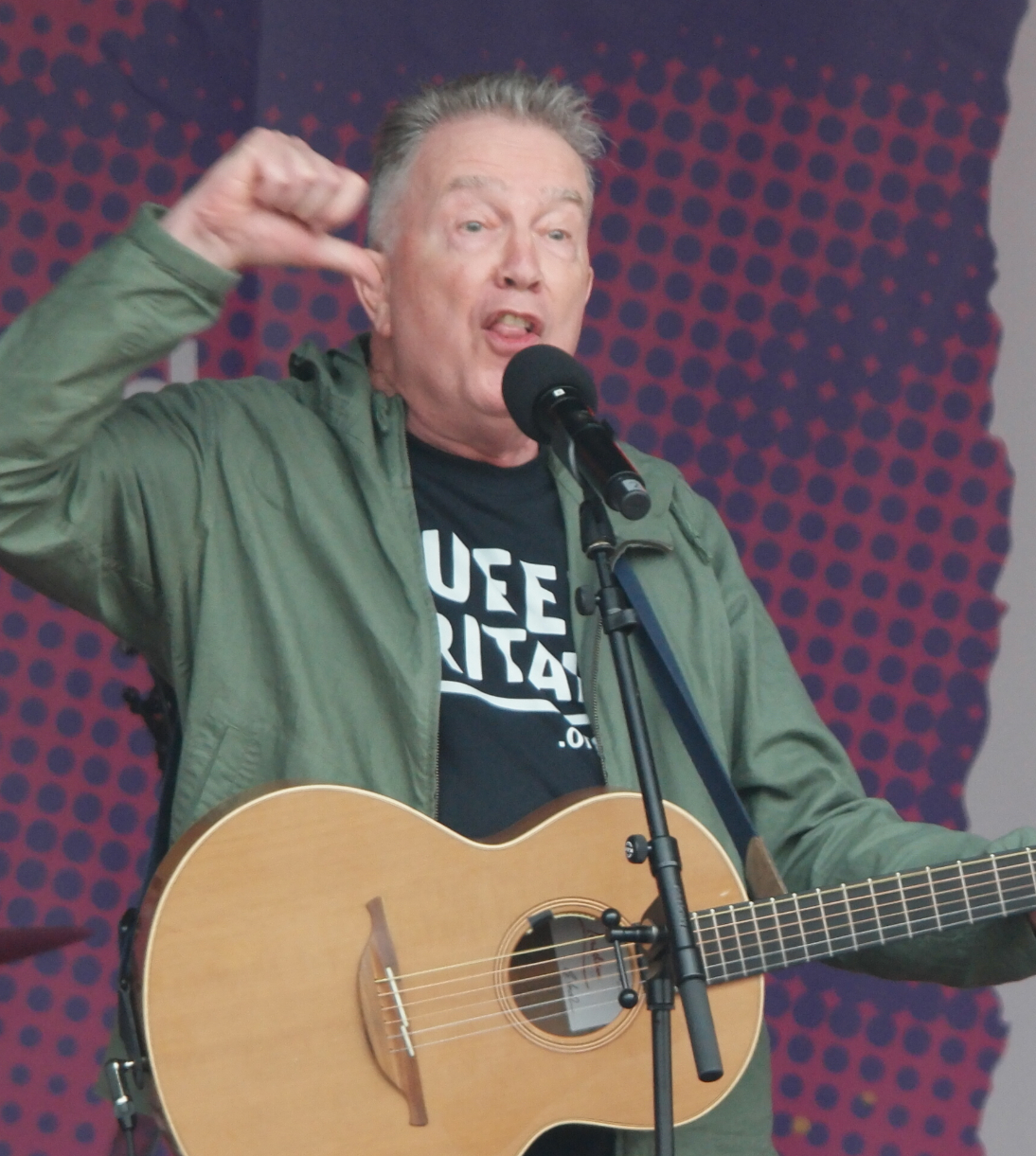
- Robinson performing at Pride in London, 2019
- Born: Thomas Giles Robinson; 1 June 1950 (age 76); Cambridge, England
- Occupations: Musician; singer-songwriter; radio presenter
- Years active: 1973–present
- Spouse: Sue Brearley (m. 1988)
- Children: 2
- Musical career
- Genres: Punk rock; new wave; pop; rock
- Instruments: Vocals, bass, guitar, keyboards, piano
- Formerly of: Café Society; Tom Robinson Band
- Website: tomrobinson.com

Thomas Giles Robinson (born 1 June 1950) is an English singer, bassist, radio presenter and long-time LGBT rights activist, best known for the hits "Glad to Be Gay", "2-4-6-8 Motorway", and "Don't Take No for an Answer", with his Tom Robinson Band. He later peaked at No. 6 in the UK singles chart with his solo single "War Baby".

== Early life ==
Tom Robinson was born into a middle-class family in Cambridge on 1 June 1950. He attended Friends' School, Saffron Walden, a co-ed privately funded Quaker school, between 1961 and 1967. He played guitar in a trio at school named The Inquisition. Robinson has two brothers, including Matthew, and a sister.

At the age of 13, Robinson realised that he was gay when he fell in love with another boy at school. Until 1967, male homosexual activity was a crime in England, punishable by prison. He had a nervous breakdown and attempted suicide at 16. A head teacher got him transferred to Finchden Manor, a therapeutic community in Kent for teenagers with emotional difficulties, where he spent his following six years. At the community, Robinson was inspired by John Peel's The Perfumed Garden on pirate Radio London, and by a visit from Alexis Korner. The blues musician and broadcaster transfixed a roomful of people, using nothing but his voice and an acoustic guitar. The whole direction of Robinson's life and career became suddenly clear to him.

== Career ==
Robinson's voice
Robinson giving a brief introduction of himself (recorded 9 November 2015)

In 1973, Robinson moved to London and joined the acoustic trio Café Society. They impressed Ray Davies (of The Kinks) enough for him to sign them to his Konk label and produce their debut album. According to Robinson, Davies' other commitments made the recording a lengthy process and, after it sold only 600 copies, he left the band.

Subsequently, when the Tom Robinson Band were playing at the Nashville Rooms in London, Robinson saw Davies enter and sarcastically performed the Kinks' hit "Tired of Waiting for You". Davies retaliated with a mocking Kinks song "Prince of the Punks" (released as a B-side of "Father Christmas") about Robinson. Robinson, in turn, wrote "Don't Take No For An Answer" about Davies hindering his career; this later was released on the Rising Free EP.

In London, Robinson became involved in the emerging gay scene and embraced the politics of gay liberation, which linked gay rights to wider issues of social justice. Inspired by an early Sex Pistols gig, he founded the more political Tom Robinson Band in 1976. The following year the group released the single "2-4-6-8 Motorway", which peaked at No. 5 on the UK singles chart for two weeks. The song alludes obliquely to a gay truck driver. In February 1978 the band released the live extended play Rising Free, which peaked at No. 18 in the UK singles chart and included his anthemic song "Glad to Be Gay", originally written for a 1976 London gay pride parade. The song was banned by the BBC, but received extensive daytime play on Capital Radio. In May 1978, the band released their debut album Power in the Darkness, which was very well received, peaking at No. 4 on the UK Albums Chart, and receiving a gold certification by the BPI. Their second album, TRB Two (1979), however, was a commercial and critical failure, and the band broke up four months after its release.

In 1979, Robinson co-wrote several songs with Elton John, including his minor hit "Sartorial Eloquence (Don't Ya Wanna Play This Game No More?)", which peaked at No. 39 in the U.S. Billboard Hot 100 and a song, titled "Elton's Song", about a young boy in boarding school who has a crush on an older student. It was recorded, but not released until 1981 on the album The Fox. He played two songs live — "Glad to Be Gay" and "1967 (So Long Ago)" — during June of that year at The Secret Policeman's Ball.

In 1980, Robinson organised Sector 27, a less political rock band that released a critically acclaimed but unsuccessful album, Sector 27, produced by Steve Lillywhite. The band nevertheless received an enthusiastic reception at a Madison Square Garden concert with the Police. However, their management company went bankrupt, the band disintegrated, and Robinson suffered another nervous breakdown. Desolate, in debt, and dealing with the breakup of a relationship, Robinson fled to Hamburg, Germany, much like his idol David Bowie, who had escaped to Berlin at a low point in his life. Living in a friend's spare room, he began writing again and ended up working in East Berlin with local band NO55. He also released a German-language single, "Tango an der Wand" ("Tango at the Wall"), with lyrics by Horst Königstein, a director and screenwriter who had also written the lyrics to Peter Gabriel's German albums. However, the single failed to have a commercial impact.

In 1982, Robinson penned the song "War Baby" about divisions between East and West Germany, and recorded his first solo album North by Northwest with producer Richard Mazda. "War Baby" peaked at No. 6 in the UK singles chart and at No. 1 in the UK Indie Chart for three weeks, reviving his career. His following single, "Listen to the Radio: Atmospherics", co-written with Peter Gabriel, peaked at No. 39 in the UK singles chart, and provided him further income when it was covered by Pukka Orchestra in 1984. The Pukkas' version was a top 20 hit in Canada under the title "Listen to the Radio".

Robinson's return to Britain led to late-night performances in cabarets at the Edinburgh Fringe, some of which later surfaced on the live album Midnight at the Fringe (1988). His career enjoyed a resurgence in the mid-1990s with a trio of albums for the respected folk/roots label Cooking Vinyl and a Glastonbury performance in 1994.

In 1986, a BBC producer offered him his own radio show on the BBC World Service. Since then Robinson has, unusually, presented programmes on all the BBC's national stations: Radio 1, Radio 2, Radio 3, Radio 4, 5 Live and 6 Music. He presented The Locker Room, a long-running series about men and masculinity, for Radio 4 in the early 1990s. In 1994 he wrote and presented Surviving Suicide, about his suicide attempt. In 1997, he won a Sony Academy Award for You've Got to Hide Your Love Away, a radio documentary about gay music, produced by Benjamin Mepsted, and later hosted the Home Truths tribute to John Peel a year after his death in 2004. Until June 2025, Robinson presented Now Playing @6Music, a show that played songs based on a certain theme and listeners' input.

In his later career Robinson rarely performs live, apart from two annual free concerts, known as the Castaway Parties, for members of his mailing list. These take place in South London and Belgium every January. In the Belgian Castaway shows, he introduces many songs in Dutch. The Castaway Parties invariably feature a wide variety of established and unknown artists and groups who have included Show of Hands, Philip Jeays, Jan Allain, Jakko Jakszyk, Stoney, Roddy Frame, Martyn Joseph, the Bewley Brothers and Paleday alongside personal friends such as Lee Griffiths and T. V. Smith.

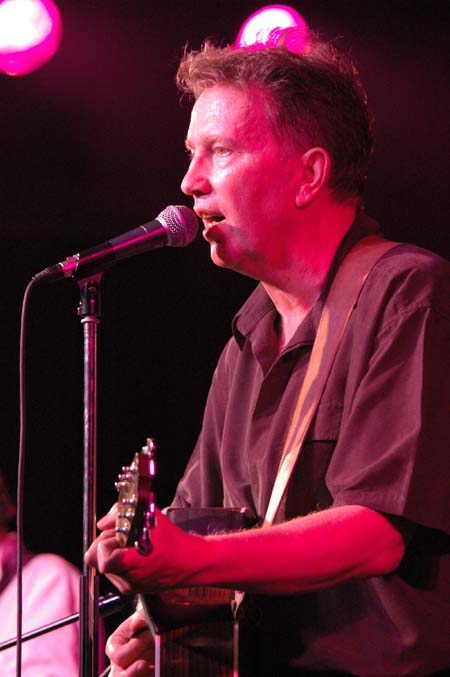
Robinson in 2004

In 2009, Robinson founded "Fresh on the Net", a showcase website for upcoming bands and artists whose aim is "to help independent musicians find new listeners, and independent listeners find new music".

Robinson played "2-4-6-8 Motorway" and "Glad to Be Gay" at the BBC introducing stage on the Friday afternoon of the 2011 Glastonbury Festival, after announcing that The Coral would not be showing as they were 'stuck in the mud'. In July 2013, at the Tabernacle on Powis Square in Notting Hill, a new line-up of TRB performed the entire Power in the Darkness album to launch its release on CD. The title track featured a guest appearance by T. V. Smith. In 2014, he was one of the performers at the opening ceremonies of WorldPride in Toronto, Ontario, Canada, alongside Melissa Etheridge, Deborah Cox and Steve Grand.

In October 2015 he released his first new album in 20 years, Only the Now. It included contributions from Billy Bragg, Ian McKellen and Lee Forsyth Griffiths. It was made with award-winning producer and multi-instrumentalist Gerry Diver and released on his own Castaway Northwest Recordings. Tom supported the album by playing many festivals that summer including Glastonbury, Latitude, Wickham and Green Man. He also played a showcase at London's Queen Elizabeth Hall in September and a 15-date tour throughout October and November. Robinson also received a BASCA Gold Badge award in the same month. This was for his exceptional contribution to British music.

In late 2018 and early 2019 Robinson deputised for Radio 2 DJ Johnnie Walker on his Sunday show Sounds of the 70s. In 2020, Robinson embarked on a four-night solo acoustic tour prior to beginning a 22-date UK "70th Birthday Tour" featuring a 5-piece band.

== Personal life ==
Robinson does not identify exclusively as gay. He has had past experiences with women and has said that he has always made it clear that he liked both men and women. He now identifies as bisexual, but in the past he used the phrase 'gay', synonymous with 'queer', to encompass the entire LGBT community. In an interview, he stated that he used the term "gay" because, "as far as Joe Public is concerned, if you're interested in other guys you're a queer... to call ourselves bi-sexual is a cop-out."

A longtime supporter and former volunteer of London's Gay Switchboard help-line, it was at a 1982 benefit party for the organisation that Robinson met Sue Brearley, the woman with whom he would eventually live and have two children, and later marry.

In the mid-1990s, when Robinson became a father, the tabloids ran stories about what they deemed as a sexual orientation change, running headlines such as "Britain's Number One Gay in Love with Girl Biker!" (The Sunday People). Robinson continued to identify as a gay man, telling an interviewer for The Guardian: "I have much more sympathy with bisexuals now, but I am absolutely not one." He added, "Our enemies do not draw the distinction between gay and bisexual."

In a 1994 interview for The Boston Globe newspaper, Robinson said: "We've been fighting for tolerance for the last 20 years, and I've campaigned for people to be able to love whoever the hell they want. That's what we're talking about: tolerance and freedom and liberty—life, liberty, and the pursuit of happiness. So if somebody won't grant me the same tolerance I've been fighting for for them, hey, they've got a problem, not me."

In 1996 Robinson released an album Having It Both Ways. On it, he added a verse to "Glad to Be Gay", in which he sings: "Well if gay liberation means freedom for all, a label is no liberation at all. I'm here and I'm queer and do what I do, I'm not going to wear a straitjacket for you." In 1998, his epic album about bisexuality, Blood Brother, won three awards at the Gay & Lesbian American Music Awards in New York.

== Activism ==
Robinson is a supporter of Amnesty International and Peter Tatchell's OutRage! human rights organisation. He was also a leader of the Rock Against Racism campaign.

== In popular culture ==
A fictionalised version of Tom Robinson, portrayed by Mathew Baynton, appears in the last episode of the first series of the BBC One television drama Ashes to Ashes, as leader at a Gay Liberation Front protest in London. The character is later incarcerated with other protestors by the time-travelling protagonist, Detective Inspector Alex Drake (played by Keeley Hawes) and dismisses her claims that he will one day marry a woman. The scene supposedly takes place on 9 October 1981, precisely fourteen months before the real Tom Robinson met his future bride.

The character then leads other protestors in singing a round of "Glad to Be Gay" in the confinement facility, much to Sergeant Viv James' annoyance. "2-4-6-8 Motorway" is also used in the soundtrack during the protest after Detective Sergeant Ray Carling sings a few bars to Alex, who then proceeds to drive a pink tank over a parked Ford Escort, which she believes would otherwise have later been used in a car bombing. Robinson's song "War Baby" (which he premiered the night he met his wife) is used in the soundtrack of the third series.

Finnish rock-group Popeda released their debut album by the same name in 1978. On the album is a song titled "Oodi Tom Robinsonille" (Ode to Tom Robinson). The song was written by bass player Ilari "Ilpo" Ainiala. Band's vocalist Pate Mustajärvi sings: "Hän laulaa meille niistä, jotka ketään eivät riistä, mutta silti saavat muiden tuomion." The refrain follows: "Tom-Tom-Tom-Tom. Tom Robinson, sä tuot voimaa tähän pimeyteen! Tom-Tom-Tom-Tom. Tom Robinson, siksi sulle oman laulun teen!" In English this goes along the lines, freely translated: "He sings us about those who deprive none, but still gets damned by everyone. Tom... Tom Robison, through the darkness you help us go on. Tom... Tom Robinson, that's why I made you this song". The melody and song structure actually resembles a lot of TRB's song "2-4-6-8 Motorway", which was released in 1977. By coincidence or not, this bit in the Finnish lyrics, "voimaa pimeyteen" (power into the darkness), almost literally means the same as Power in the Darkness, the name of the debut album of the Tom Robinson Band released in early 1978.

== Discography ==
Over his career, Robinson has released more than twenty albums either as a solo performer or as a member of a group. He has also released fanclub-only bootlegs known as the Castaway Club series.

=== Albums ===
- North by Northwest (1982)
- Hope and Glory (1984) – peaked at No. 21 in the UK Albums Chart
- Still Loving You (1986)
- The Collection (1987)
- Last Tango: Midnight at the Fringe (1988)
- We Never Had It So Good (1990, with Jakko Jakszyk)
- Winter of '89 (1992, bootlegged as Motorway: Live)
- Living in a Boom Time (1992)
- Love over Rage (1994)
- Having It Both Ways (1996)
- The Undiscovered Tom Robinson (1998)
- Home from Home (1999)
- Smelling Dogs (2001, spoken word album)
- Only the Now (2015)

=== Singles ===
Year	Song	Peak chart positions	
Year	Song	UK	AUS
1980	"Can't Keep Away"	–	–
1980	"Not Ready"	–	–
1980	"Invitation"	–	–
1981	"Total Recall"	–	–
1982	"Now Martin's Gone"	–	–
1983	"War Baby"	6	73
1983	"Listen to the Radio: Atmospherics"	39	–
1984	"Back in the Old Country"	79	–
1984	"Rikki Don't Lose That Number"	58	–
1985	"Prison"	–	–
1986	"Nothing Like the Real Thing"	–	–
1986	"Still Loving You"	88	–
1987	"Feel So Good"	93	–
1987	"Spain"	–	–
1988	"Hard Cases"	–	–
1990	"Blood Brother"	–	–
1992	"Living in a Boom Time"	–	–
1994	"Hard"	–	–
1994	"Days (That Changed The World)"	–	–
1996	"Connecticut"	–	–

Song compositions

- "Elton's Song" (lyrics by Tom Robinson, with music by Elton John)
- "Talk About It In The Morning" (Martyn Joseph/Tom Robinson)
- "He Never Said" (Martyn Joseph/Tom Robinson)
