= Tom Robinson Band =

English rock band

Background information
- Also known as: TRB
- Origin: London, England
- Genres: Pub rock, punk rock
- Years active: 1976–1979, 1989–1991, 2015
- Labels: EMI, Harvest
- Past members: Tom Robinson; Mark Ambler; Danny Kustow; Dolphin Taylor; Preston Heyman; Ian Parker; Nick Plytas; Charlie Morgan; Steve Witter; Steve Creese

The Tom Robinson Band (TRB) were an English rock band, established in 1976 by singer, songwriter and bassist Tom Robinson. The band's debut single "2-4-6-8 Motorway" was a top five hit on the UK Singles Chart in 1977, and their third single, "Up Against the Wall", is seen by some as a classic punk rock single; while their debut album, Power in the Darkness (1978), is regarded as a definitive late-1970s punk album. Their song "Glad to Be Gay" is considered a British national gay anthem.

== History ==
Tom Robinson began gigging in London in 1976. By the end of the year, he had decided to put together a permanent band. Robinson's old friend, guitarist Danny Kustow, was the first in the permanent line-up. They ran small ads in the music papers looking for a bass player and drummer. Robinson found drummer Brian "Dolphin" Taylor. The search for a bass player continued, until Mark Ambler auditioned. Some days later, Ambler mentioned he also played keyboards; he had spent many years studying piano with veteran jazz musician Stan Tracey. After listening to Ambler playing his Hammond organ Robinson realised he would have to be the bass player himself.

The band hit the club scene right in the middle of London's punk explosion. Their live shows got favourable reviews, and soon A&R men were attending many of their gigs.

EMI Records signed the Tom Robinson Band (TRB). Robinson later described this period, saying "Within nine months we'd made the transition from signing on at Medina Road dole office to Top of the Pops, Radio One, EMI Records and the giddy heights of the front cover of the New Musical Express". (Note: The dole office was situated on Medina Road in London's Finsbury Park) TRB made leaflets and fliers about their political views and sent them to everyone who attended their gigs. They gave away badges and made up T-shirts emblazoned with the band's logo and they appeared regularly at Rock Against Racism concerts. They were joined at these gigs by the likes of The Clash, Steel Pulse and X-Ray Spex.

"2-4-6-8 Motorway" was their first single, released in late 1977, which got into the top five of the UK Singles Charts and stayed there for over a month. It was followed almost immediately by their next record, a four-song EP called Rising Free, which was recorded live at London's Lyceum Theatre in November 1977. It contained the songs "Don't Take No for an Answer", "Martin", "(Sing if You're) Glad to Be Gay" and "Right on Sister". The EP reached No. 18 in the UK Singles Charts.

In early 1978, TRB recorded their debut album, Power in the Darkness. The UK version of the LP contained all new songs, but in the US (on the Harvest label), the "2-4-6-8 Motorway" single and Rising Free record were combined for a six-track bonus EP that made the album almost a double.

== Change in line-up ==
Power in the Darkness reached number 4 in the UK Albums Chart and won the band a gold record, and TRB were voted "Best New Band" and "Best London Band" for the year 1977 by listeners at the Capital Radio Music Awards. Keyboardist Mark Ambler left the band after recording the first album. Session pianist Nick Plytas was drafted in as a temporary replacement, and played with TRB at a major Anti-Nazi League rally in London's Victoria Park early that year. Keyboardist Ian Parker joined as a permanent replacement for Ambler. TRB then went to Rockfield Studios in Wales to record their next album, TRB Two. When they started recording, Chris Thomas, who had produced their first album, was at the control deck. Drummer Dolphin Taylor suggested Todd Rundgren to replace Thomas. After not being able to decide which tracks should appear on the LP, the band eventually agreed to let Rundgren choose. However, when Rundgren picked two of the songs Taylor particularly disliked, Taylor decided that he would rather leave rather than play on the tracks. A day later Taylor had calmed down and offered to return, but Robinson refused, and Preston Heyman was recruited as an emergency stand-in. Heyman's picture was included on the album cover, but there was never any intention for him to join the band permanently. Taylor's eventual replacement was Charlie Morgan who had played for Kate Bush, and went on to drum for Elton John for a further fifteen years.

To support the album's release, the band went on tour, but by this point the TRB's infighting had taken its toll. When guitarist Kustow decided to quit in 1979 that was the end of TRB. Their last two gigs were in Torhout and Werchter, Belgium in 1979.

In 1989, Robinson, Kustow and Ambler put together a reunion tour with Steve Creese on drums. They played sold-out shows at the Marquee Club in London and went on for the best part of a year before splitting again.

== Discography ==
=== Albums ===
==== Studio ====
Year	Album details	Peak position		
Year	Album details	UK	AUS	US
1978	Power in the Darkness: Release date: May 1978; Label: EMI Records	4	52	144
1979	TRB Two: Release date: March 1979; Label: EMI Records	18	–	163

==== Live ====
Year	Album details	Peak position
Year	Album details	UK Albums Chart
1982	Cabaret '79: First live album (recorded at the Collegiate Theatre June 1979); Release date: November 1982; Label: Statik Records	–
1992	The Winter Of 89: aka Motorway – Live In Concert; Release date: 1992; Label: Music De Luxe	–
1997	Glad to Be Gay Cabaret: Reissue of Cabaret '79; Release date: August 1997; Label: EMI Records	–

==== Compilations ====
Year	Album details	Peak position
Year	Album details	UK Albums Chart
1981	TRB 3: First compilation; Release date: 1981; Label: EMI Records	–
1987	The Collection 77-87: Second compilation^{1}; Release date: September 1987; Label: EMI Records	–
1996	The Gold Collection: Third compilation; Release date: March 1996; Label: EMI Records	–
1997	Rising Free: The Very Best of TRB: Fourth compilation^{1}; Release date: June 1997; Label: EMI Records	–
2013	The Anthology 1977–1979: Fifth compilation; Release date: 2013; Label: EMI Records	–

=== Singles and EPs ===
Year	Song (A side / B side)	Peak position	
Year	Song (A side / B side)	UK Singles Chart	AUS
1977	"2-4-6-8 Motorway" "I Shall Be Released"	5	13
1978	Rising Free (EP) ("Don't Take No for an Answer" / "Martin" "Glad to Be Gay" / "Right on Sister")	18	–
1978	"Up Against the Wall" "I'm Alright Jack"	33	–
1978	"Too Good to Be True" "Power in the Darkness"	–	–
1979	"Bully for You" "Our People"	68	–
1979	"Alright All Night" "Black Angel"	–	–
1979	"Never Gonna Fall in Love (Again)" "Getting Tighter"^{2}	–	99

Notes:
^{1} Includes post-TRB material.
^{2} Released as "Tom Robinson & the Voice Squad".

== See also ==
- Category:Songs written by Mark Ambler
- List of punk bands from the United Kingdom
- List of 1970s punk rock musicians
- List of new wave artists
- List of Peel Sessions
- Music of the United Kingdom (1970s)
- List of performers on Top of the Pops
