= The Jam discography =

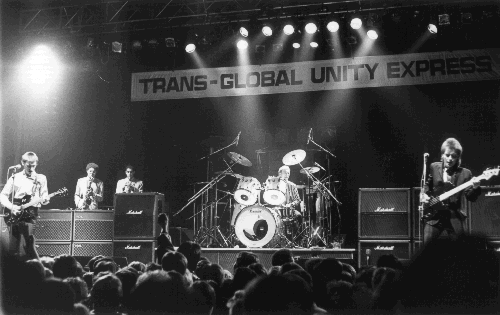
- The Jam performing in April 1982.
- Studio albums: 6
- Extended plays: 3
- Live albums: 10
- Compilation albums: 7
- Singles: 18
- B-sides: 3
- Video albums: 7
- Box sets: 5

The discography of the British band the Jam consists of 6 studio albums, 5 live albums, 7 compilation albums, 5 box sets, 6 videos, 3 extended plays, 18 singles, and 3 B-sides. The band, who formed in 1972, didn't debut until five years later in 1977, when they released their debut studio album, In the City, which entered the UK Albums Chart at No. 20, and contained the title-track, "In the City". Their second album, This Is the Modern World, was the first to get into the Billboard 200 (US Albums Chart), taking its place at No. 201 while at No. 22 in the UK Albums Chart. Their most successful studio album was their final album, The Gift, in 1982, which reached No. 1 in the UK and peaked at No. 82 in the US.

The Jam were seen as the centre of mod revival culture during the 1970s to the 1980s, and the lead singer of the band, Paul Weller, was seen as The Modfather. The band separated in 1982, following ten years active, and five years of success. Shortly after the band's break-up, Weller went on to form The Style Council, before embarking on a solo career and releasing his first studio album, which was self-titled, in 1992.

== Albums ==
=== Studio albums ===
Title	Album details	Peak chart positions								Certifications (sales thresholds)
Title	Album details	UK	AUS	CAN	NL	NOR	NZ	SWE	US	Certifications (sales thresholds)
In the City	Released: 8 May 1977; Label: Polydor Records	20	—	—	—	—	—	—	—	BPI: Silver
This Is the Modern World	Released: 18 November 1977; Label: Polydor Records	22	—	—	—	—	—	—	— (Note: This Is the Modern World did not chart on the Billboard 200, but it peaked at No. 1 on the Bubbling Under the Top LPs chart.)	BPI: Silver
All Mod Cons	Released: 3 November 1978; Label: Polydor Records	6	—	—	—	—	—	—	— (Note: All Mod Cons did not chart on the Billboard 200, but it peaked at No. 4 on the Bubbling Under the Top LPs chart.)	BPI: Gold
Setting Sons	Released: 16 November 1979; Label: Polydor Records	4	70	75	—	—	14	—	137	BPI: Gold
Sound Affects	Released: 28 November 1980; Label: Polydor Records	2	53	39	—	—	2	17	72	BPI: Gold
The Gift	Released: 12 March 1982; Label: Polydor Records	1	23	22	14	30	10	7	82	BPI: Gold
"—" denotes albums that did not chart or were not released in given country.

=== Live albums ===
Title	Album details	Peak chart positions						Certifications (sales thresholds)
Title	Album details	UK	AUS	NL	NZ	SWE	US	Certifications (sales thresholds)
Dig the New Breed	Released: 10 December 1982; Label: Polydor Records	2	54	47	17	25	131	BPI: Gold
Live Jam	Released: 25 October 1993; Label: Polydor Records	28	—	—	—	—	—	
The Jam at the BBC	Released: 21 May 2002; Label: Universal	33	—	—	—	—	—	
Copenhagen April 1982	Released: 19 November 2012; Label: Polydor Records	—	—	—	—	—	—	
Live at the Brighton Centre December 1979	Released: 10 November 2014; Label: Polydor Records, Universal UMC	—	—	—	—	—	—	
Live at Newcastle City Hall 28th October 1980	Released: 30 October 2015; Label: Polydor Records, Universal UMC	—	—	—	—	—	—	
Fire and Skill – The Jam Live	Released: 30 October 2015; Label: Polydor Records	84	—	—	—	—	—	
Live at the Music Machine	Released: 21 October 2016; Label: Polydor Records	—	—	—	—	—	—	
Live at Reading University 16th February 1979	Released: 16 December 2016; Label: Polydor Records, Universal UMC	—	—	—	—	—	—	
The Jam Live at the Hammersmith Palais 14th December 1981	Released: 20 January 2017; Label: Polydor Records, Universal UMC	—	—	—	—	—	—	
Live at Wembley Arena 2nd December 1982	Released: 2017; Label: Polydor Records, Universal UMC	—	—	—	—	—	—	
"—" denotes albums that did not chart or were not released in given country.

=== Compilation albums ===
Title	Album details	Peak chart positions				Certifications (sales thresholds)
Title	Album details	UK	AUS	IRE	NZ	Certifications (sales thresholds)
Snap!	Released: 14 October 1983; Label: Polydor Records	2	70	38	22	BPI: Platinum
Greatest Hits	Released: 1 July 1991; Label: Polydor Records	2	—	—	—	BPI: Silver
Extras	Released: 6 April 1992; Label: Polydor Records	15	—	—	—	BPI: Gold
The Jam Collection	Released: 22 October 1996; Label: Polydor Records	58	—	—	—	
The Very Best of The Jam	Released: 25 October 1997; Label: Polydor Records	9	—	—	—	
The Sound of the Jam	Released: 21 May 2002; Label: Polydor Records	3	—	75	—	BPI: Gold
About the Young Idea: The Very Best of The Jam	Released: 30 June 2015; Label: Universal	36	—	—	—	
"—" denotes albums that did not chart or were not released in given country.

=== Box sets ===
Title	Album details	Peak chart positions	Certifications (sales thresholds)
Title	Album details	UK	Certifications (sales thresholds)
Direction Reaction Creation	Released: 26 May 1997; Label: Polydor Records	8	BPI: Silver
45 rpm: The Singles, 1977–1979	Released: 2 April 2001; Label: Polydor Records	—	
45 rpm: The Singles, 1980–1982	Released: 30 April 2001; Label: Polydor Records	—	
Classic Album Selection	Released: 3 December 2012; Label: Universal	—	
1977	Released: 20 October 2017; Label: Universal	49	
"—" denotes releases that did not chart or were not released in given country.

== Extended plays ==
Title	Album details	Peak chart positions
Title	Album details	US
The Jam	Released: 1981 (US); Label: Polydor Records	176
The Bitterest Pill (I Ever Had to Swallow)	Released: 1982 (US); Label: Polydor Records	135
Beat Surrender	Released: 1983 (US); Label: Polydor Records	171

== Singles ==
Title	Year	Peak chart positions								Certifications (sales thresholds)	Album
Title	Year	UK	AUS	BEL (FL)	CAN	NL	NZ	SWE	US Dance	Certifications (sales thresholds)	Album
"In the City"	1977	40	—	—	—	—	—	—	—		In the City
"All Around the World"	1977	13	—	—	—	—	—	—	—		Non-album single
"The Modern World"	1977	36	—	—	—	—	—	—	—		This Is the Modern World
"News of the World"	1978	27	—	—	—	—	—	—	—		Non-album single
"David Watts" / "'A' Bomb in Wardour Street" (double A-side)	1978	25	—	—	—	—	—	—	—		All Mod Cons
"Down in the Tube Station at Midnight"	1978	15	—	—	—	—	—	—	—	BPI: Silver	All Mod Cons
"Strange Town"	1979	15	—	—	—	—	—	—	—	BPI: Silver	Non-album singles
"When You're Young"	1979	17	—	—	—	—	—	—	—		Non-album singles
"The Eton Rifles"	1979	3	—	—	—	—	—	—	—	BPI: Silver	Setting Sons
"Going Underground" / "Dreams of Children" (double A-side)	1980	1	—	—	—	—	28	18	—	BPI: Platinum	Non-album single
"Start!"	1980	1	—	—	—	—	—	—	75	BPI: Silver	Sound Affects
"That's Entertainment"	1981	21	—	—	—	—	34	—	—	BPI: Platinum	Sound Affects
"Funeral Pyre"	1981	4	72	—	—	—	—	—	—	BPI: Silver	Non-album singles
"Absolute Beginners"	1981	4	—	—	—	—	35	—	—		Non-album singles
"Town Called Malice" / "Precious" (double A-side)	1982	1	15	4	19	7	14	—	45	BPI: 3× Platinum	The Gift
"Just Who Is the 5 O'Clock Hero?"	1982	8	—	—	—	—	—	—	—		The Gift
"The Bitterest Pill (I Ever Had to Swallow)"	1982	2	91	—	—	—	50	—	—	BPI: Silver	Non-album singles
"Beat Surrender"	1982	1	35	—	—	45	35	—	—	BPI: Silver	Non-album singles
"—" denotes albums that did not chart or were not released in given country.

== Music videos ==
Year	Song	Director	Album
1977	"In the City"	Unknown	In the City
1977	"Art School"	Unknown	In the City
1978	"News of the World"	Unknown	Non-album singles
1979	"Strange Town"	Steve Barron	Non-album singles
1979	"When You’re Young"	Steve Barron	Non-album singles
1980	"Going Underground"	Steve Barron	Non-album singles
1980	"The Dreams of Children"	Steve Barron	Non-album singles
1980	"Start!"	Unknown	Sound Affects
1981	"That’s Entertainment"	Unknown	Sound Affects
1981	"Funeral Pyre"	Unknown	Non-album singles
1981	"Absolute Beginners"	Mike Brady	Non-album singles
1982	"Town Called Malice"	Mike Brady	The Gift
1982	"Precious"	Mike Brady	The Gift
1982	"The Bitterest Pill (I Ever Had to Swallow)"	Lindsey Clennell	Non-album single

== Videography ==
- Transglobal Unity Express (1982)
- Snap! (1983)
- Greatest Hits (1991)
- The Very Best of the Jam (1997)
- The Complete Jam on Film 1977–1982 (2002)
- Punk Icons (2006)
- About the Young Idea (2015)
