= 1982 in British television =

This is a list of British television related events from 1982.

== Events ==
=== January ===
- 1 January
  - Associated Television (ATV) is restructured into Central Independent Television but still broadcasts in the Midlands. Television South (TVS) starts broadcasting to the South and South East of England, replacing Southern Television and Television South West (TSW) starts broadcasting to the South West, replacing Westward Television.
  - The Bluebell Hill transmitter in Kent is transferred from Thames/LWT to TVS, to increase the size of TVS's new South East sub-region and the Kendal transmitter, covering much of southern Cumbria, is transferred from Granada to Border.
  - Yorkshire Television extends its coverage on the Lancashire/Yorkshire border, when transmitters covering Todmorden and Walsden are transferred from the Granada region.
  - In London, the Friday handover hour for Thames and LWT is moved from 7pm to 5:15pm.
  - The network television premiere of Steven Spielberg's 1977 science-fiction epic Close Encounters of the Third Kind on ITV, starring Richard Dreyfuss, François Truffaut and Melinda Dillon.
  - The network television premiere of Stanley Kubrick's 1968 science-fiction classic 2001: A Space Odyssey on BBC1.
- 2 January
  - The US action series The Fall Guy makes its UK debut on ITV, starring Lee Majors.
  - The late night comedy show O.T.T., made by Central Independent Television, makes its debut on ITV, presented by Tiswas regulars Chris Tarrant, Lenny Henry and Bob Carolgees; the adult-oriented series runs for 12 episodes only, but gives Alexei Sayle his first high-profile television exposure.
- 3 January – The final edition of The Generation Game to be presented by Larry Grayson is broadcast on BBC1. It is a compilation of highlights of the previous series. The show will return with Bruce Forsyth presenting again in 1990.
- 4 January – Peter Davison makes his first full appearance as the Fifth Doctor in the Doctor Who serial Castrovalva.
- 7 January – BBC1 begins showing the US children's series Huckleberry Finn and His Friends, based on the stories by Mark Twain.
- 5 January – Let's Pretend, a television programme for preschoolers and the replacement programme for Pipkins, makes its debut on ITV.
- 8 January
  - The Post-World War II era set family drama series Shine on Harvey Moon makes its debut on ITV, starring Kenneth Cranham.
  - Launch of London Weekend Television's Friday evening magazine programme The Six O'Clock Show. Until December 1987, it includes a fifteen minute news bulletin produced by Thames and is called Thames Weekend News.
- 11 January – World snooker champion Steve Davis becomes the first player to make a maximum 147 break on television during ITV's coverage of the Lada Classic.
- January – John Birt replaces Michael Grade as Director of Programmes at London Weekend Television and makes major changes to output aimed at maximising audiences with some niche programming, such as arts and science, moving out of primetime to the schedule margins to make way for more entertainment shows at peak time.

=== February ===
- 3 February – The British television premiere of John Carpenter's 1978 slasher Halloween on ITV, starring Jamie Lee Curtis and Donald Pleasence.
- February – The first ever 3D broadcast in the UK is shown by TVS. The programme includes excerpts of test footage shot by Philips in the Netherlands. Red/green 3D glasses are given away free with copies of TV Times, but the 3D sections of the programme are shown in monochrome.

=== March ===
- 2 March – The second TV adaptation of John Mortimer's play A Voyage Round My Father, produced by Thames for ITV, airs with Laurence Olivier as Mortimer's blind barrister father, Alan Bates as the young Mortimer, Elizabeth Sellars as the mother and Jane Asher as Elizabeth as well as blind actor Esmond Knight as a sighted judge.
- 5 March – The BBC is given permission by the Government to start broadcasting television programmes on two satellite channels from early 1986. However, the channels are not launched.
- 5 March – The network television premiere of the 1973 Clint Eastwood Dirty Harry sequel Magnum Force on ITV, six months before the BBC shows the first Dirty Harry film.
- 21 March – The network television premiere of Michael Anderson's 1976 science-fiction thriller Logan's Run on BBC1, starring Michael York, Jenny Agutter, Richard Jordan, Roscoe Lee Browne, Farrah Fawcett-Majors and Peter Ustinov.
- 27 March – The final edition of the Saturday morning children's magazine show Multi-Coloured Swap Shop is broadcast on BBC1.
- 28 March – The network television premiere of the 1977 James Bond film, The Spy Who Loved Me on ITV, starring Roger Moore. The broadcast of the film is reportedly watched by 22 million viewers.
- 29 March – The US police drama Cagney & Lacey makes its UK debut on BBC1.

=== April ===
- 2 April – The Falklands War begins as Argentina invades the Falkland Islands. Both the BBC and ITV broadcast additional and extended news bulletins throughout the conflict.
- 3 April
  - The final edition of the children's Saturday morning series Tiswas is broadcast on ITV. It has been shown, albeit originally as a regional show made by ATV, since 1974.
  - The network television premiere of Michael Crichton's 1979 heist comedy The First Great Train Robbery on ITV, starring Sean Connery, Donald Sutherland and Lesley-Anne Down.
- 6 April – ITV debuts The Human Race, a six-part series produced for Thames Television and presented by English anthropologist Desmond Morris, as he travels all over the world and rifles film archives to show the vast diversity of human culture and behaviour. The series ends on 11 May.
- 12 April – The network television premiere of the film The Boys from Brazil starring Gregory Peck, Laurence Olivier, Lilli Palmer is shown on ITV.
- 14 April – Actor Arthur Lowe gives a live interview on BBC's Pebble Mill at One. He collapses in the evening and dies the following day.
- 15 April – BBC2's start time moves to the later time of 5:10pm with transmissions beginning with a single Open University programme with regular programmes now beginning at 5:40pm. For the past six months, BBC2 has been starting its weekday broadcasts at the earlier time of 3:55pm.
- 16 April – Debut of game show Odd One Out on BBC1, presented by Paul Daniels.
- 17 April – The BBC launches its first Summer Saturday morning magazine show, Get Set. However, unlike its winter counterpart, the summer shows air for the first half of the morning only. This allows for an earlier start to Grandstand to accommodate live test cricket and on the weeks that cricket is not being shown, a feature film is broadcast from around 11am until the start of Grandstand at 12:30pm.
- 24 April – The 27th Eurovision Song Contest is held in Harrogate, North Yorkshire. The contest is presented by Jan Leeming and won by Germany's Nicole with "Ein bißchen Frieden".
- 26 April – The Satellite Channel launches, but to be able to view the channel in the UK a satellite dish approximately 10 feet (3 meters) wide is required due to the satellite on which the channel is broadcast.

=== May ===
- 1 May – The US soap opera Dynasty makes its UK debut on BBC1.
- 4 May – The long-running live evening chat show Wogan makes its debut on BBC1, presented by Terry Wogan. It will be shown three times a week from 1985 and will continue until July 1992.
- 9 May – BBC1 airs live coverage of the London Marathon for the first time. It had aired highlights of the event under the International Athletics strand the previous year.
- 26 May – The network television premiere of Don Taylor's 1978 horror sequel Damien: Omen II on ITV, starring William Holden.
- 28 May–2 June – The BBC and ITV provide extensive live coverage of Pope John Paul II's visit to the UK.
- 31 May – ITV premiers the 1973 animated film Charlotte's Web 1973 film.

=== June ===
- 12 June – The network television premiere of Philip Kaufman's 1978 science-fiction horror remake Invasion of the Body Snatchers on ITV, starring Donald Sutherland, Brooke Adams, Veronica Cartwright, Jeff Goldblum and Leonard Nimoy.
- 14 June – The Falklands War ends after Argentina surrenders.
- 17 June – The US musical high school drama Fame makes its UK debut on BBC1.
- 20 June – The BBC relaunches its Sunday morning programme for the Asian community, and changes the title to Asian Magazine.
- 22 June – ITV shows Ray Harryhausen's 1977 fantasy adventure film Sinbad and the Eye of the Tiger.

=== July ===
- 11 July – The network television premiere of Ridley Scott's 1979 science-fiction horror Alien on ITV, starring Sigourney Weaver, Tom Skerritt, John Hurt, Ian Holm, Yaphet Kotto and Harry Dean Stanton.
- 26 July – Alasdair Milne succeeds Ian Trethowan as Director-General of the BBC.

=== August ===
- 2 August – Test broadcasts commence for Channel 4 and S4C. These mainly consist of showing the IBA's testcard ETP-1 between 9am and 8pm.
- 19 August – Final broadcast of Welsh language serial Pobol Y Cwm shown on BBC1 in England on some transmitters as the series would move to S4C when the channel launches in November along with other Welsh language programmes. The series would make a brief return on BBC TV with a trial run for a network screening in 1994.

=== September ===
- 4 September – Debut of The Late, Late Breakfast Show on BBC1, presented by Noel Edmonds.
- 8 September – The network television premiere of Don Siegel's 1971 American thriller Dirty Harry on BBC1, starring Clint Eastwood.
- 19 September – Clive James on Television makes its debut on ITV in which Australian-born TV critic and journalist Clive James looks at bizarre television shows from around the world.
- 20 September – The BBC Schools computer-generated ident launches.
- 23 September – HTV launches a weekly current affairs programme Wales This Week.
- 25 September – ITV screens the 1979 feature length made for TV movie Buck Rogers in the 25th Century.

=== October ===
- 1 October – BBC2’s weekday daytime four-hour transmitter shutdown is suspended for the next four months. This is to assist riggers adjust aerials during the lead up to, and the launch of, Channel 4.
- 2 October – The first edition of Saturday morning children's show Saturday Superstore is broadcast on BBC1. Hosted by Mike Read, Sarah Greene and Keith Chegwin, it adopts a similar format to its predecessor, Multi-Coloured Swap Shop.
- 3–9 October – As part of its coverage of the 1982 Commonwealth Games, the BBC airs a two-hour breakfast programme called Breakfast with Brisbane. It includes regular news summaries and is the first time the BBC has broadcast a scheduled news bulletin at breakfast and comes three months ahead of the launch of their own breakfast television programme Breakfast Time. Other coverage of the Games consists of highlights programmes aired at lunchtime and early evening.
- 6 October – BBC1 starts airing season 6 of the US drama series Dallas.
- 10 October – Alan Bleasdale's hard-hitting Liverpool-set drama Boys from the Blackstuff makes its debut on BBC2, starring Bernard Hill as the downtrodden character Yosser Hughes. The final episode is shown on 7 November.
- 17 October – The network television premiere of Peter Brook's 1963 adventure Lord of the Flies on BBC2.
- 23 October – ITV begins showing the Japanese science-fiction marionette series Star Fleet, with the theme tune written and performed by Paul Bliss.
- 24 October – The network television premiere of George Lucas' epic 1977 science-fiction blockbuster Star Wars: A New Hope on ITV, starring Mark Hamill, Harrison Ford, Carrie Fisher and Alec Guinness. At the time it is the most money ITV has spent on a single film, $4 million for three showings over seven years; however they go on to show Star Wars a total of five times (October 1982, September 1983, December 1984, January 1987 and January 1988). The debut 1982 showing draws in an estimated audience of over 16.8 million viewers.
- 25 October – ITV debuts Harry's Game, a three-part drama miniseries made by Yorkshire Television closely based on Gerald Seymour's 1975 novel of the same name starring Ray Lonnen, Derek Thompson and Benjamin Whitrow. The drama is noted for its haunting theme song by the Irish musical group Clannad reaching top five of the UK Singles Chart, bringing the band its first major international exposure. The serial continues on 27 October.
- 31 October – Programmes in Welsh are broadcast both on the BBC and HTV for the final time.

=== November ===
- 1 November – S4C, the first Welsh language TV service, is launched.
- 2 November – Channel 4, the fourth UK television service, starts broadcasting outside Wales at 4:40pm as a free-to-air public broadcast channel owned and operated by Channel Four Television Corporation, publicly owned but funded entirely from commercial activities, with continuity announcer Paul Coia.
  - At 4:45pm, the first programme shown is the game show Countdown, presented by Richard Whiteley, which, barring the news, is the only programme from the launch night which will still be running over forty years later.
  - At 7:00pm, the first edition of Channel 4 News, the UK's first hour-long news programme, is broadcast.
  - At 8:00pm, the first ever episode of the soap opera Brookside is broadcast. It is shown on Tuesdays and Wednesdays at 8pm and will run until 2003. Phil Redmond's production company Mersey Television has acquired a real street of new houses in Liverpool for the filming.
  - At 10:15pm is the debut of comedy The Comic Strip Presents... Five Go Mad in Dorset, first of six comedies parodying The Famous Five (including dog) doing some detective work while on holiday in the West Country, featuring early TV appearances from Dawn French and Jennifer Saunders. It captures the Broadcasting Press Guild prize for 'best comedy'.
  - Also debuting this evening in the UK is Australian comedy The Paul Hogan Show.
- 3 November – Debut of the nostalgic coming-of-age film P'tang, Yang, Kipperbang on Channel 4, written by Jack Rosenthal, produced by David Puttnam and directed by Michael Apted as part of the First Love series.
- 4 November – The first of six episodes of Tom Keating on Painters is broadcast. Channel 4 entices viewers to their pioneering instructional programme with an ad in The Times that invites them to: "Watch the great 16th century Italian painter Tom Keating [who] believes the spirits of the Old Masters sometimes enter him as he works on a canvas. Tonight, in the first of a series, watch Titian paint Tarquin and Lucretia through Keating." The art restorer and notorious art forger secures for Channel 4 one of two Broadcasting Press Guild awards for its very first season: ‘Best on-screen performance in a non-acting role’ for Keating. A Times television critic writes, "Tom Keating does more than just break new ground in art appreciation... Instruction by example: that is the Keating approach."
- 5 November
  - Debut of Channel 4's innovative music show The Tube, presented by Jools Holland and Paula Yates.
  - The network television premiere of Woodstock on Channel 4, Michael Wadleigh's 1970 documentary about the counterculture 1969 festival which took place near Bethel, New York and was a great commercial and critical success. The opening and closing acts are the same in the film as they appeared on stage with Richie Havens opening the show and Jimi Hendrix closing it.
  - Welsh soap opera Pobol Y Cwm airs on S4C for the first time, after the last episode was shown on BBC Wales the previous week.
- 6 November – Channel 4 airs its first terrestrial television showing of Sidney Lumet's 1976 American satirical drama Network, starring Faye Dunaway, William Holden, Peter Finch and Ned Beatty. The film was shown during the launch of S4C six days earlier.
- 7 November – Coverage of American football is first shown on Channel 4 at 5:30pm, beginning the channel's association with the sport. The programme is initially presented by Nicky Horne and Miles Aiken, but due to an NFL players strike over pay negotiation rules, it is forced to show matches played earlier in the season. In spite of this and of the British viewing public's limited knowledge of American football, coverage of the sport proves to be popular. The players have ended their action by January 1983, enabling Channel 4 to air live coverage of that year's Super Bowl.
- 7–28 November – The London Weekend Television epic production The Life and Adventures of Nicholas Nickleby is aired by Channel 4 over its first four Sunday evenings on the air.
- 8 November – Channel 4 begins airing basketball coverage, presented by Simon Reed and Miles Aiken. Each week sees coverage of a match from Division One of the National Basketball League with highlights of the first half of the game and live coverage of the second half. The first match to be shown is a game between the Birmingham Bullets and Crystal Palace.
- 9 November – The first episode of the anarchic sitcom The Young Ones is broadcast on BBC2, starring Rik Mayall, Ade Edmondson, Nigel Planer, Christopher Ryan and Alexei Sayle and written by Mayall, Ben Elton and Lise Mayer.
- 14 November – The viewer complaints programme Right to Reply is first broadcast on Channel 4.
- 16 November – A dispute over new technology forces Border to close for around a month.
- 20 November – BBC1 begins showing the five-part historical Japanese-set drama Shōgun, based on James Clavell's acclaimed novel and starring Richard Chamberlain.
- 29 November – ITV conducts a national 3D experiment with red/blue glasses allowing colour 3D to be shown for the first time. The programme, an episode of the weekly science magazine The Real World produced by TVS is shown on a weekday evening and repeated that weekend on Sunday afternoon, followed by a rare showing of the Western Fort Ti on 5 December, starring George Montgomery and Joan Vohs.

=== December ===
- 2 December – 10.2 million viewers see a classic comedy scene from the Only Fools and Horses episode "A Touch of Glass" in which the Trotters accidentally smash a priceless chandelier.
- 23 December – Service Information is broadcast on BBC2 for the final time.
- 25 December – The network television premiere of the 1979 Disney science-fiction adventure The Black Hole on ITV, starring Maximilian Schell, Robert Forster, Yvette Mimieux, Joseph Bottoms, Anthony Perkins and Ernest Borgnine. TSW choose to opt out and show a different movie instead.
- 26 December – Debut of Raymond Briggs' The Snowman on Channel 4. The acclaimed children's animated short film will go on to be repeated each Christmas.
- 27 December
  - The network television premiere of the 1979 James Bond film Moonraker on ITV, starring Roger Moore.
  - BBC1 shows the network television premiere of the 1976 version of King Kong, starring Jeff Bridges and Jessica Lange.
  - Channel 4 airs its first theme night, Fifties to the Fore. The evening includes episodes of ABC and ATV shows such as Armchair Theatre and Oh Boy!.
- 28 December
  - The network television premiere of the 1978 blockbuster musical Grease on BBC1, starring John Travolta and Olivia Newton-John.
  - The network television premiere of Hal Needham's 1977 American comedy Smokey and the Bandit on ITV, starring Burt Reynolds, Sally Field and Jackie Gleason.

== Debuts ==
=== BBC1 ===
- 3 January – Gulliver in Lilliput (1982)
- 4 January – Police (1982)
- 6 January – The Story of the Treasure Seekers (1982)
- 7 January – Huckleberry Finn and His Friends (1979–1980)
- 8 January – Fame is the Spur (1982)
- 10 January – King's Royal (1982–1983)
- 28 January – Goodbye, Mr Kent (1982)
- 31 January – Stalky & Co. (1982)
- 16 February – Legacy of Murder (1982)
- 1 March – Alexa (1982)
- 25 March – Love Is Old, Love Is New (1982)
- 29 March – Cagney & Lacey (1981–1988)
- 11 April – Badger by Owl-Light (1982)
- 13 April – Play for Tomorrow (1982)
- 16 April – Odd One Out (1982–1985)
- 22 April – Bird of Prey (1982)
- 1 May – Dynasty (1981–1989)
- 4 May – Wogan (1982–1992)
- 5 May – Secrets (1982)
- 1 June – Take Two (1982–1996)
- 17 June – Fame (1982–1987)
- 17 August – An Inspector Calls (1982)
- 4 September – The Late, Late Breakfast Show (1982–1986)
- 5 September – Cousin Phillis (1982)
- 9 September – Claire (1982)
- 28 September – With My Little Eye (1982)
- 29 September – The Jockey School (1982)
- 2 October
  - Carrott's Lib (1982–1983)
  - Saturday Superstore (1982–1987)
- 3 October – The Hound of the Baskervilles (1982)
- 19 October – Squadron (1982)
- 31 October – Beau Geste (1982)
- 10 November – Billy Boy (1982)
- 17 November – Break Point (1982)
- 20 November – Shōgun (1980)
- 30 December
  - 'Allo 'Allo! (1982–1992)
  - The Barretts of Wimpole Street (1982)
  - Then Churchill Said to Me (made but not screened until 1993)
- 31 December – Ghost in the Water (1982)

=== BBC2 ===
- 7 January – Ennal's Point (1982)
- 13 January – The Bell (1982)
- 25 January – West Country Tales (1982–1983)
- 10 February – Nancy Astor (1982)
- 18 February – County Hall (1982)
- 5 March – Dear Heart (1982)
- 14 April – The Woman in White (1982)
- 19 May – Frost in May (1982)
- 6 July – Food and Drink (1982–2002)
- 14 July – Cloud Howe (1982)
- 2 August – Jane (1982)
- 1 September – Timewatch (1982–present)
- 20 September
  - Smiley's People (1982)
  - There's a Lot of It About (1982)
- 21 September – Take Three Women (1982)
- 8 October – L for Lester (1982)
- 10 October – Boys from the Blackstuff (1982)
- 17 October – Wagner's Ring (1982)
- 1 November – The Further Adventures of Lucky Jim (1982)
- 4 November – Eureka (1982–1986)
- 9 November – The Young Ones (1982–1984)
- 10 November – The Barchester Chronicles (1982)
- 12 November – Objects of Affection (1982)
- 14 December – Another Flip for Dominick (1982)
- 26 December – Spider's Web (1982)
- 29 December – East Lynne (1982)

=== ITV ===
- 1 January – Central News (1982–present)
- 2 January
  - No. 73 (1982–1988)
  - O.T.T. (1982)
  - The Fall Guy (1981–1986)
- 3 January – Airline (1982)
- 4 January
  - Don't Rock the Boat (1982–1983)
  - Let's Pretend (1982–1988)
  - Let There Be Love (1982–1983)
- 5 January
  - Emu's World (1982–1984)
  - CBTV (1982–1985)
- 8 January – Shine on Harvey Moon (1982–1985, 1995)
- 12 January – Muck and Brass (1982)
- 12 February – We'll Meet Again (1982)
- 15 February – Dead Ernest (1982)
- 16 February – On Safari (1982–1985)
- 18 February – Falcon Crest (1981–1990)
- 26 February – The Haunting of Cassie Palmer (1982)
- 28 February – Father Charlie (1982)
- 1 March – Murphy's Mob (1982–1985)
- 2 March – A Voyage Round My Father (1985)
- 14 March – Whoops Apocalypse (1982)
- 29 March – 3-2-1 Contact (1980–1988)
- 31 March – All for Love (1982–1983) (Anthology)
- 4 April – A Kind of Loving (1982)
- 6 April
  - The Brack Report (1982)
  - The Human Race (1982)
- 13 April – Horace (1982)
- 14 April – I Remember Nelson (1982)
- 16 April – The Bounder (1982–1983)
- 18 April – Jangles (1982)
- 19 April – Union Castle (1982)
- 28 May – On the Line (1982)
- 9 June – Andy Robson (1982–1983)
- 10 June – There's Nothing to Worry About! (1982)
- 14 June – The World Cup: A Captain's Tale (1982)
- 30 June – Something in Disguise (1982)
- 6 July – Pullover (1982)
- 9 July – Rep (1982)
- 12 July – A.J. Wentworth, B.A. (1982)
- 25 July – All for Love (1982–1983)
- 26 July – Ragdolly Anna (1982–1987)
- 2 August – Comic Roots (1982–1983)
- 6 August – Third Time Lucky (1982)
- 1 September – Radio Phoenix (1982)
- 7 September – The Agatha Christie Hour (1982)
- 13 September
  - Hold Tight! (1982–1987)
  - Tom, Dick and Harriet (1982–83)
  - Living in Styal (1982) (prison documentary)
- 19 September – Clive James on Television (1982–1988)
- 23 September – Wales This Week (1982–present)
- 26 September – Ivanhoe (1982)
- 23 October – Star Fleet (1982–1983)
- 25 October
  - Foxy Lady (1982–1984)
  - Harry's Game (1982)
- 27 October – A Country Practice (1981–1994)
- 30 October – The Saturday Show (1982–1984)
- 31 October – Young Sherlock: The Mystery of the Manor House (1982)
- 3 November – The Cut Price Comedy Show (1982–1983)
- 7 November – Sunday Sunday (1982–1990)
- 9 November – S.W.A.L.K. (1982)
- 10 November – Nobody's Hero (1982)
- 13 November – Saturday Night Thriller (1982)
- 28 December – Anyone for Denis? (1982)
- Unknown – Fables of the Green Forest (1982)

=== Channel 4 ===
- 2 November
  - Countdown (1982–present)
  - Brookside (1982–2003)
  - Channel 4 News (1982–present)
  - The Comic Strip Presents (1982–2005)
  - Lucy-May of the Southern Rainbow (1982)
  - The Paul Hogan Show (1973–1984)
- 3 November – P'tang, Yang, Kipperbang (1982)
- 4 November – Tom Keating on Painters (1982–1984)
- 5 November – The Tube (1982–1987)
- 7 November – The Life and Adventures of Nicholas Nickleby (1982)
- 14 November
  - Right to Reply (1982–2001)
  - Murun Buchstansangur (1982–1985)
- 26 December – The Snowman (1982)
- 28 December – Treasure Hunt (1982–1989)
- Unknown – Black on Black (1982–1985)

=== S4C ===
- 1 November
  - SuperTed (1982–1986)
  - Newyddion (1982–present)
- 3 November – Y Byd ar Bedwar (1982–present)
- 4 November – Joni Jones (1982)
- 5 November – Anturiaethau Syr Wynff a Plwmsan (1982–1989)
- 11 November – Noson Lawen (1982–present)
- Unknown – Wil Cwac Cwac (1982–1986)

== New channels ==
Date	Channel
26 April	The Satellite Channel
1 November	S4C
2 November	Channel 4

== Television shows ==
=== Changes of network affiliation ===
Show	Moved from	Moved to
Lucy-May of the Southern Rainbow (1982)	BBC1	Channel 4

== Continuing television shows ==
=== 1920s ===
- BBC Wimbledon (1927–1939, 1946–2019, 2021–present)

=== 1930s ===
- Trooping the Colour (1937–1939, 1946–2019, 2023–present)
- The Boat Race (1938–1939, 1946–2019, 2021–present)
- BBC Cricket (1939, 1946–1999, 2020–2024)

=== 1940s ===
- Come Dancing (1949–1998)

=== 1950s ===
- The Good Old Days (1953–1983)
- Panorama (1953–present)
- Crackerjack (1955–1984, 2020–present)
- What the Papers Say (1956–2008)
- The Sky at Night (1957–present)
- Blue Peter (1958–present)
- Grandstand (1958–2007)

=== 1960s ===
- Coronation Street (1960–present)
- Songs of Praise (1961–present)
- Animal Magic (1962–1983)
- Doctor Who (1963–1989, 1996, 2005–present)
- World in Action (1963–1998)
- Top of the Pops (1964–2006)
- Match of the Day (1964–present)
- Crossroads (1964–1988, 2001–2003)
- Play School (1964–1988)
- Mr. and Mrs. (1965–1999)
- World of Sport (1965–1985)
- Jackanory (1965–1996, 2006)
- Sportsnight (1965–1997)
- Call My Bluff (1965–2005)
- The Money Programme (1966–2010)
- Reksio (1967–1990)
- The Big Match (1968–2002)
- Nationwide (1969–1983)
- Screen Test (1969–1984)

=== 1970s ===
- The Old Grey Whistle Test (1971–1987)
- The Two Ronnies (1971–1987, 1991, 1996, 2005)
- Crown Court (1972–1984)
- Pebble Mill at One (1972–1986, 1991–1996)
- Rainbow (1972–1992, 1994–1997)
- Emmerdale (1972–present)
- Newsround (1972–present)
- Weekend World (1972–1988)
- We Are the Champions (1973–1987)
- Last of the Summer Wine (1973–2010)
- That's Life! (1973–1994)
- Wish You Were Here...? (1974–2003)
- Arena (1975–present)
- Jim'll Fix It (1975–1994)
- Gambit (1975–1985, 1995)
- Rentaghost (1976–1984)
- One Man and His Dog (1976–present)
- Open All Hours (1976, 1981–1982, 1985)
- The Professionals (1977–1983)
- Butterflies (1978–1983, 2000)
- 3-2-1 (1978–1988)
- Grange Hill (1978–2008)
- Ski Sunday (1978–present)
- Terry and June (1979–1987)
- The Book Tower (1979–1989)
- Blankety Blank (1979–1990, 1997–2002)
- The Paul Daniels Magic Show (1979–1994)
- Antiques Roadshow (1979–present)
- Question Time (1979–present)

=== 1980s ===
- Play Your Cards Right (1980–1987, 1994–1999, 2002–2003)
- Family Fortunes (1980–2002, 2006–2015, 2020–present)
- The Gentle Touch (1980–1984)
- Juliet Bravo (1980–1985)
- Cockleshell Bay (1980–1986)
- Children in Need (1980–present)
- The Gaffer (1981–1983)
- A Fine Romance (1981–1984)
- Punchlines (1981–1984)
- Finders Keepers (1981–1985)
- Freetime (1981–1985)
- Game for a Laugh (1981–1985)
- Tenko (1981–1985)
- That's My Boy (1981–1986)
- Razzamatazz (1981–1987)
- Bergerac (1981–1991)
- BBC News After Noon (1981–1986)
- Sorry! (1981–1988)

== Ending this year ==
- Unknown
  - Boys from the Blackstuff (1982)
  - Harry's Game (1982)
  - Noggin the Nog (1959–1970, 1979–1982)
  - O.T.T. (1982)
- 1 January – Clapperboard (1972–1982)
- 13 February – The Goodies (1970–1982)
- 6 March – Dick Turpin (1979–1982)
- 8 March – Not the Nine O'Clock News (1979–1982)
- 27 March – Multi-Coloured Swap Shop (1976–1982)
- 2 April – Friday Night, Saturday Morning (1979–1982)
- 3 April – Tiswas (1974–1982)
- 10 April – Parkinson (1971–1982, 1998–2007)
- 25 April – Open All Hours (1976, 1981–1982, 1985, 2013)
- 30 July – It's a Knockout (1966–1982, 1999–2001)
- 31 August – Sapphire & Steel (1979–1982)
- 8 September – Into the Labyrinth (1980–1982)
- 15 October – Something Else (1978–1982)
- 20 October – Strangers (1978–1982)
- 16 December – Only When I Laugh (1979–1982)
- 27 December – Sorry! (1981–1982, 1985–1988)
  Lucy-May of the Southern Rainbow (1982)

== Births ==
- 3 January – Amanda Robbins, model
- 20 January – Joe Swash, actor
- 9 March – Paul 'Des' Ballard, television presenter
- 22 March – Pete Bennett, reality show contestant
- 2 April – Jenny Ryan, game show contestant and Chaser on The Chase
- 24 April – Laura Hamilton, television presenter
- 28 April – Nikki Grahame, model, dancer and television personality (died 2021)
- 7 June – Amy Nuttall, actress and opera singer
- 13 June – Davood Ghadami, actor
- 6 August – Karl Davies, actor
- 22 September – Billie Piper, singer and actress
- 28 October – Matt Smith, actor
- 29 November – Imogen Thomas, reality show contestant
- 21 December – Tom Payne, soap actor

== Deaths ==
Date	Name	Age	Cinematic Credibility
11 January	Ronald Lewis	53	actor
15 January	Robert Lynn	63	television director
21 March	Harry H. Corbett	57	actor (Steptoe and Son)
26 March	Sam Kydd	67	actor
15 April	Arthur Lowe	66	actor (Dad's Army, Coronation Street)
26 April	Celia Johnson	73	actress
19 May	Elwyn Jones	59	television scriptwriter and producer
19 May	Corbet Woodall	53	television newsreader
22 June	Alan Webb	75	actor
29 June	Michael Brennan	69	actor
11 July	Susan Littler	34	actress
12 July	Kenneth More	67	actor
19 July	John Harvey	70	actor
2 August	Cathleen Nesbitt	93	actress
14 August	Patrick Magee	60	actor
22 August	John Boxer	73	actor
6 September	Norman Collins	74	television executive
29 September	Lucy Griffiths	63	actress
6 October	Philip Green	71	theme tune composer
4 November	Talfryn Thomas	60	actor (Dad's Army)
16 November	Arthur Askey	82	comedian
26 November	Robert Coote	73	actor
30 November	Eric Thompson	53	actor and scriptwriter
2 December	Marty Feldman	48	comedian and actor (At Last the 1948 Show, Marty)

== See also ==
- 1982 in British music
- 1982 in British radio
- 1982 in the United Kingdom
- List of British films of 1982
