= 1982 in British music =

This is a summary of 1982 in music in the United Kingdom, including the official charts from that year.

== Events ==
- 20 January – Ozzy Osbourne bites the head off a bat thrown at him during a performance, mistaking it for a toy.
- 3 March – The Barbican Arts Centre in London is opened by the Queen.
- 21 March – The Musical House that Max Built, a documentary about Peter Maxwell Davies, is broadcast by London Weekend Television, presented by Melvyn Bragg.
- 26 April – Rod Stewart is mugged in Los Angeles, California. Stewart loses his $50,000 Porsche to the mugger, but was not hurt.
- 10 May – Topper Headon is sacked from the Clash for his ongoing addiction to heroin, just a few days prior to the release of the band's Combat Rock album. He is replaced by original Clash drummer Terry Chimes.
- 15 May – "A Little Peace" becomes the 500th UK number-one single.
- 26 May – The Rolling Stones open their European tour in Aberdeen, Scotland.
- 22 August – The first performance of Image, Reflection, Shadow, by Peter Maxwell Davies takes place at the Lucerne Festival in Switzerland.
- 28 August – Eric Burdon is arrested for cocaine possession after a show at the Rockpalast in Cologne.
- 11 September – The first concert is held at the new St David's Hall, Cardiff. The official opening is not until five months later.
- 14 September – Thea Musgrave's radio opera An Occurrence at Owl Creek Bridge premieres on BBC Radio 3.
- 22 September – The Who begin their only formally announced "farewell" tour in Washington, D.C.
- 2 October – The first performance of Imogen Holst‘s String Quintet takes place at the Cricklade Festival by the Endellion String Quartet with Steven Isserlis on cello. It is this work that Holst herself said made her “a real composer”.
- 30 October – Paul Weller shocks fans, and his bandmates, by announcing that the Jam are to disband, just prior to a short UK tour. "Beat Surrender" would be the band's final single, and became their fourth and final UK number one.
- 5 November – First broadcast of The Tube on Channel 4.
- 11 December – The Jam give their final performance together, at Brighton Conference Centre, just before their split.

== Charts ==
=== Number-one singles ===
Week Ending Date	Song	Artist(s)	Sales
2 January	"Don't You Want Me"	The Human League	
9 January	"Don't You Want Me"	The Human League	106,000
16 January	"The Land of Make Believe"	Bucks Fizz	73,000
23 January	"The Land of Make Believe"	Bucks Fizz	102,000
30 January	"Oh Julie"	Shakin' Stevens	74,000
6 February	"The Model"/"Computer Love"	Kraftwerk	108,000
13 February	"Town Called Malice"/"Precious"	The Jam	123,000
20 February	"Town Called Malice"/"Precious"	The Jam	178,000
27 February	"Town Called Malice"/"Precious"	The Jam	106,000
6 March	"The Lion Sleeps Tonight"	Tight Fit	148,000
13 March	"The Lion Sleeps Tonight"	Tight Fit	106,000
20 March	"The Lion Sleeps Tonight"	Tight Fit	94,000
27 March	"Seven Tears"	Goombay Dance Band	119,000
3 April	"Seven Tears"	Goombay Dance Band	106,000
10 April	"Seven Tears"	Goombay Dance Band	87,000
17 April	"My Camera Never Lies"	Bucks Fizz	79,000
24 April	"Ebony and Ivory"	Paul McCartney and Stevie Wonder	92,000
1 May	"Ebony and Ivory"	Paul McCartney and Stevie Wonder	144,000
8 May	"Ebony and Ivory"	Paul McCartney and Stevie Wonder	103,000
15 May	"A Little Peace"	Nicole	87,000
22 May	"A Little Peace"	Nicole	101,000
29 May	"House of Fun"	Madness	92,000
5 June	"House of Fun"	Madness	88,000
12 June	"Goody Two Shoes"	Adam Ant	73,000
19 June	"Goody Two Shoes"	Adam Ant	74,000
26 June	"I've Never Been to Me"	Charlene	62,000
3 July	"Happy Talk"	Captain Sensible	77,000
10 July	"Happy Talk"	Captain Sensible	92,000
17 July	"Fame"	Irene Cara	98,000
24 July	"Fame"	Irene Cara	167,000
31 July	"Fame"	Irene Cara	189,000
7 August	"Come on Eileen"	Dexys Midnight Runners and the Emerald Express	165,000
14 August	"Come on Eileen"	Dexys Midnight Runners and the Emerald Express	174,000
21 August	"Come on Eileen"	Dexys Midnight Runners and the Emerald Express	145,000
28 August	"Come on Eileen"	Dexys Midnight Runners and the Emerald Express	113,000
4 September	"Eye of the Tiger"	Survivor	137,000
11 September	"Eye of the Tiger"	Survivor	104,000
18 September	"Eye of the Tiger"	Survivor	101,000
25 September	"Eye of the Tiger"	Survivor	82,000
2 October	"Pass the Dutchie"	Musical Youth	120,000
9 October	"Pass the Dutchie"	Musical Youth	224,000
16 October	"Pass the Dutchie"	Musical Youth	143,000
23 October	"Do You Really Want to Hurt Me?"	Culture Club	135,000
30 October	"Do You Really Want to Hurt Me?"	Culture Club	132,000
6 November	"Do You Really Want to Hurt Me?"	Culture Club	98,000
13 November	"I Don't Wanna Dance"	Eddy Grant	111,000
20 November	"I Don't Wanna Dance"	Eddy Grant	149,000
27 November	"I Don't Wanna Dance"	Eddy Grant	101,000
4 December	"Beat Surrender"	The Jam	95,000
11 December	"Beat Surrender"	The Jam	99,000
18 December	"Save Your Love"	Renée and Renato	81,000
25 December	"Save Your Love"	Renée and Renato	125,256

"The Model"/"Computer Love" was the first single by a German artist to top the chart since its establishment 29 years earlier. By the end of 1982, there had been two further number ones by German artists, "Seven Tears" and "A Little Peace".

=== Number-one albums ===
Issue Date	Song	Artist(s)
2 January	The Visitors	ABBA
9 January	Dare	The Human League
16 January	Dare	The Human League
23 January	Dare	The Human League
30 January	Love Songs	Barbra Streisand
6 February	Love Songs	Barbra Streisand
13 February	Love Songs	Barbra Streisand
20 February	Love Songs	Barbra Streisand
27 February	Love Songs	Barbra Streisand
6 March	Love Songs	Barbra Streisand
13 March	Love Songs	Barbra Streisand
20 March	The Gift	The Jam
27 March	Love Songs	Barbra Streisand
3 April	Love Songs	Barbra Streisand
10 April	The Number of the Beast	Iron Maiden
17 April	The Number of the Beast	Iron Maiden
24 April	1+9+8+2	Status Quo
1 May	Barry Live In Britain	Barry Manilow
8 May	Tug of War	Paul McCartney
15 May	Tug of War	Paul McCartney
22 May	Complete Madness	Madness
29 May	Complete Madness	Madness
5 June	Avalon	Roxy Music
12 June	Complete Madness	Madness
19 June	Avalon	Roxy Music
26 June	Avalon	Roxy Music
3 July	The Lexicon of Love	ABC
10 July	The Lexicon of Love	ABC
17 July	The Lexicon of Love	ABC
24 July	Fame	Soundtrack
31 July	Fame	Soundtrack
7 August	The Kids from "Fame"	The Kids from "Fame"
14 August	The Kids from "Fame"	The Kids from "Fame"
21 August	The Kids from "Fame"	The Kids from "Fame"
28 August	The Kids from "Fame"	The Kids from "Fame"
4 September	The Kids from "Fame"	The Kids from "Fame"
11 September	The Kids from "Fame"	The Kids from "Fame"
18 September	The Kids from "Fame"	The Kids from "Fame"
25 September	The Kids from "Fame"	The Kids from "Fame"
2 October	Love Over Gold	Dire Straits
9 October	Love Over Gold	Dire Straits
16 October	Love Over Gold	Dire Straits
23 October	Love Over Gold	Dire Straits
30 October	The Kids from "Fame"	The Kids from "Fame"
6 November	The Kids from "Fame"	The Kids from "Fame"
13 November	The Kids from "Fame"	The Kids from "Fame"
20 November	The Kids from "Fame"	The Kids from "Fame"
27 November	The Singles: The First Ten Years	ABBA
4 December	The John Lennon Collection	John Lennon
11 December	The John Lennon Collection	John Lennon
18 December	The John Lennon Collection	John Lennon
25 December	The John Lennon Collection	John Lennon

== Year-end charts ==
The tables below include sales between 1 January and 31 December 1982: the year-end charts reproduced in the issue of Music Week dated 26 December 1982 and played on Radio 1 on 2 January 1983 only include sales figures up until 11 December 1982.

=== Best-selling singles ===
No.	Title	Artist	Peak position
1	"Come On Eileen"	Dexys Midnight Runners & the Emerald Express	1
2	"Fame"	Irene Cara	1
3	"Eye of the Tiger"	Survivor	1
4	"The Lion Sleeps Tonight"	Tight Fit	1
5	"Do You Really Want to Hurt Me?"	Culture Club	1
6	"Pass the Dutchie"	Musical Youth	1
7	"I Don't Wanna Dance"	Eddy Grant	1
8	"Seven Tears"	Goombay Dance Band	1
9	"Ebony and Ivory"	Paul McCartney and Stevie Wonder	1
10	"Town Called Malice"/"Precious"	The Jam	1
11	"Golden Brown"	The Stranglers	2
12	"Mad World"	Tears for Fears	3
13	"Mickey"	Toni Basil	2
14	"Love Plus One"	Haircut One Hundred	3
15	"The Model"/"Computer Love"	Kraftwerk	1
16	"Oh Julie"	Shakin' Stevens	1
17	"Goody Two Shoes"	Adam Ant	1
18	"Heartbreaker"	Dionne Warwick	2
19	"Only You"	Yazoo	2
20	"Don't Go"	Yazoo	3
21	"Walking on Sunshine"	Rockers Revenge featuring Donnie Calvin	4
22	"Zoom"	Fat Larry's Band	2
23	"Save Your Love"	Renée and Renato	1
24	"I Won't Let You Down"	PhD	3
25	"Just an Illusion"	Imagination	2
26	"Starmaker"	The Kids from "Fame"	3
27	"Hard to Say I'm Sorry"	Chicago	4
28	"Abracadabra"	Steve Miller Band	2
29	"The Look of Love"	ABC	4
30	"Centerfold"	The J. Geils Band	3
31	"House of Fun"	Madness	1
32	"The Land of Make Believe"	Bucks Fizz	1
33	"Maid of Orleans (The Waltz Joan of Arc)"	Orchestral Manoeuvres in the Dark	4
34	"Young Guns (Go for It)"	Wham!	3
35	"Ain't No Pleasing You"	Chas & Dave	2
36	"Save a Prayer"	Duran Duran	2
37	"T'ain't What You Do (It's the Way That You Do It)"	Fun Boy Three with Bananarama	4
38	"A Little Peace"	Nicole	1
39	"Hungry Like the Wolf"	Duran Duran	5
40	"My Camera Never Lies"	Bucks Fizz	1
41	"It Started with a Kiss"	Hot Chocolate	5
42	"Fantasy Island"	Tight Fit	5
43	"Dead Ringer for Love"	Meat Loaf	5
44	"Inside Out"	Odyssey	3
45	"Torch"	Soft Cell	2
46	"This Time (We'll Get It Right)"/"We'll Fly the Flag"	England World Cup Squad	2
47	"Say Hello, Wave Goodbye"	Soft Cell	3
48	"I've Never Been to Me"	Charlene	1
49	"Mirror Man"	The Human League	2
50	"Papa's Got a Brand New Pigbag"	Pigbag	3

=== Best-selling albums ===
No.	Title	Artist	Peak position
1	Love Songs	Barbra Streisand	1
2	The Kids from "Fame"	The Kids from "Fame"	1
3	Complete Madness	Madness	1
4	The Lexicon of Love	ABC	1
5	Rio	Duran Duran	2
6	Love Over Gold	Dire Straits	1
7	Pelican West	Haircut One Hundred	2
8	Dare	The Human League	1
9	Avalon	Roxy Music	1
10	The John Lennon Collection	John Lennon	1
11	Too Rye Ay	Dexys Midnight Runners	2
12	Pearls	Elkie Brooks	2
13	All for a Song	Barbara Dickson	3
14	Upstairs at Eric's	Yazoo	2
15	Tropical Gangsters	Kid Creole and the Coconuts	3
16	The Gift	The Jam	1
17	Bat Out of Hell	Meat Loaf	12 (Note: Reached number 9 in 1981)
18	Tug of War	Paul McCartney	1
19	The Number of the Beast	Iron Maiden	1
20	Non-Stop Erotic Cabaret	Soft Cell	5
21	Friends	Shalamar	11
22	Chariots of Fire	Vangelis	6
23	Architecture & Morality	Orchestral Manoeuvres in the Dark	3
24	Love and Dancing	League Unlimited Orchestra	3
25	The Singles: The First Ten Years	ABBA	1
26	Barry Live in Britain	Barry Manilow	1
27	Greatest Hits	Queen	2 (Note: Reached number 1 in 1981)
28	Fame	Original Soundtrack	1
29	4	Foreigner	5
30	The Kids from "Fame" Again	The Kids from "Fame"	2
31	Night Birds	Shakatak	4
32	Love Songs	The Commodores	5
33	Tin Drum	Japan	13
34	Action Trax	Various Artists	2
35	Asia	Asia	11
36	Heartbreaker	Dionne Warwick	3
37	Still Life	The Rolling Stones	4
38	Reflections	Various Artists	4
39	Give Me Your Heart Tonight	Shakin' Stevens	3
40	Dead Ringer	Meat Loaf	7 (Note: Reached number 1 in 1981)
41	Kissing to Be Clever	Culture Club	5
42	Three Sides Live	Genesis	2
43	The Concert in Central Park	Simon & Garfunkel	6
44	Mirage	Fleetwood Mac	5
45	Begin the Beguine	Julio Iglesias	5
46	1+9+8+2	Status Quo	1
47	From the Makers of...	Status Quo	4
48	Chart Beat/Chart Heat	Various Artists	2
49	Pearls II	Elkie Brooks	5
50	In the Heat of the Night	Imagination	7

== Classical music ==
=== New works ===
- Malcolm Arnold – Trumpet Concerto
- David Bedford – The Juniper Tree, for soprano, recorder and harpsichord
- Richard Rodney Bennett
  - After Syrinx, for oboe and piano
  - Anniversaries, for ensemble
  - Freda's Fandango, for ensemble
  - Summer Music, for flute and piano
- Lennox Berkeley
  - Mazurka for piano
  - Sonnet for high voice and piano
- Michael Berkeley
  - The Crocodile and Father William, for girls choir
  - Easter, anthem for choir, organ and brass
  - Gregorian Variations for orchestra
  - Guitar Sonata in one movement
  - Nocturne for flute, harp, violin, viola and cello
  - Piano Trio
  - Romance of the Rose, for orchestra
- David Blake
  - Change is Going to Come, for mezzo, baritone, chorus and four players
  - String Quartet No. 3
- Edward Cowie
  - Choral Symphony (Symphonies of Rain, Sea and Speed) (1981-2)
  - Harp Concerto
  - Kate Kelly's Roadshow, music theatre
  - Kelly Ballet
  - Symphony No 2, Australian
- Gordon Crosse
  - A Wake, for flute, clarinet, cello and piano
  - Rhymes and Reasons, Trio for clarinet, cello and piano
- Peter Maxwell Davies
  - Image, Reflection, Shadow, for ensemble
  - Organ Sonata
  - Pole Star March for brass quintet or band
  - Sea Eagle, for horn
  - Sinfonia Concertante for chamber orchestra
  - Songs of Hoy, masque for children's voices
- Peter Dickinson – The Unicorns, for soprano and brass band
- Brian Ferneyhough – Carceri d'Invenzione for chamber orchestra
- Michael Finnissy
  - Aijal, for flute, oboe and percussion
  - Anninnia, for soprano and piano
  - Banumbirr, for ensemble
  - Dilok, for oboe and piano
  - Gerhana, for solo percussion
  - Mississippi Hornpipe, for violin and piano
  - Tya, for ensemble
  - Warara, for tenor, flute, clarinet and two percussion
- Iain Hamilton
  - Love is Life's Spring, for soprano and piano
  - St Mark's Passion, for soli and chorus
- Robin Holloway
  - Anthem, for unaccompanied voices
  - Concertino No. 4 Showpiece, for fourteen players
  - From Hills and Valleys, for brass band (1981-2)
  - Men Marching for brass band (1981-2)
  - Serenata Notturna, for four horns and small orchestra
  - Suite for saxophone
  - Women in War, review for four female soloists and piano
- Gordon Jacob – Flute concerto No. 2, for flute and strings
- Wilfred Josephs
  - High Spirits, orchestral overture
  - Percussion Concerto, for percussion and brass
  - Two Flute Studies
  - Viola Concerto
- Kenneth Leighton – Fantasy Octet Hommage to Percy Grainger
- John McCabe
  - Concerto for Orchestra
  - Desert III: Landscape, for violin, cello and piano
  - Lamentation Rag, for piano
  - String Quartet No. 4
- Elizabeth Maconchy
  - My Dark Heart, song cycle for soprano and ensemble
- William Mathias
  - Antiphonies, for organ
  - Lux Aeterna, for soli, chorus, organ and orchestra
  - Salvator Mundi, for female choir, piano duet, percussion and strings
- Nicholas Maw
  - Night Thoughts, for solo flute
  - Spring Music, for orchestra
  - String Quartet No. 2
- Thea Musgrave – Fanfare for brass quintet
- Paul Patterson – Sinfonia for strings
- John Tavener
  - Doxa, for chorus
  - The Lamb, for unaccompanied chorus
  - Lord's Prayer, for chorus
  - Mandoodles, for a young pianist
  - Towards the Son: Ritual Procession for chamber orchestra
- Michael Tippett – The Mask of Time, oratorio
- William Walton
  - Passacaglia, for solo cello
  - Prologo e Fantasia, for orchestra
- Hugh Wood – Symphony

=== Opera ===
- Lennox Berkeley – Faldon Park
- Gavin Bryars – Medea
- Alexander Goehr – Behold the Sun
- Wilfred Josephs – The Montgolfier's Famous Flying Club, operetta for schools

== Film and Incidental music ==
- Michael Nyman – The Draughtsman's Contract directed by Peter Greenaway.

== Musical theatre ==
- Anthony Burgess – Blooms of Dublin
- Geoffrey Burgon – Orpheus

== Music awards ==
=== BRIT Awards ===
The 1982 BRIT Awards winners were:

- Best British producer: Martin Rushent
- Best classical recording: Gustav Mahler's – "Symphony No. 10"
- Best selling album: Adam and the Ants – "Kings of the Wild Frontier"
- British breakthrough act: The Human League
- British female solo artist: Randy Crawford
- British group: The Police
- British male solo artist: Cliff Richard
- Outstanding contribution: John Lennon

== Births ==
- 11 January – Ashley Taylor Dawson, singer (allSTARS*)
- 16 January – Preston, singer
- 20 January – Chris Park, singer (Phixx)
- 10 March – Jonathan Ansell, tenor (G4)
- 6 March – Sinead Shepard, Irish singer (Six)
- 11 March – Kyle Anderson, Northern Irish singer (Six)
- 23 March – Emma O'Driscoll, Irish singer (Six) and TV presenter
- 7 April – Kelli Young, singer (Liberty X)
- 26 April – Jon Lee, singer (S Club 7)
- 30 April – Cleo Higgins, singer (Cleopatra)
- 7 June – Amy Nuttall, actress and opera singer
- 18 June – Haydon Eshun, singer (Ultimate Kaos)
- 20 June – Example, singer-songwriter, musician and rapper
- 30 June – Ashley Walters, rapper and actor
- 17 July – Natasha Hamilton, singer (Atomic Kitten)
- 22 September – Billie Piper, singer and actress
- 4 October – YolanDa Brown, jazz saxophonist
- 14 December – Anthony Way, chorister
- 29 December – Cherise Roberts, singer (Big Brovaz, Booty Luv)
- date unknown – Charlotte Bray, composer

== Deaths ==
- 6 January – Katherine Bacon, concert pianist, 85
- 12 January
  - Hervey Alan, operatic bass and voice teacher, 71
  - Dorothy Howell, pianist and composer, 83
- 18 January – Alec Robertson, music critic, 89
- 30 January – Stanley Holloway, actor, singer and monologist, 91
- 4 February – Alex Harvey, rock singer and entertainer, 46 (heart attack)
- 20 March – Roy Fox, American-born dance bandleader, 80
- 1 May – William Primrose, violist, 77
- 6 May – Rosamond Harding, music scholar, 84
- 12 May – Humphrey Searle, composer, 66
- 24 May – Richard Hall, composer, 78
- 16 June – James Honeyman-Scott, guitarist of The Pretenders, 25 (heart failure caused by cocaine intolerance)
- 25 June – Alex Welsh, jazz musician, 52
- 29 June – Pipe Major Donald MacLeod, bagpipe musician and composer, 65
- 4 July – Maurice Blower, composer, 88
- 1 September – Clifford Curzon, classical pianist, 75
- 29 September – A. L. Lloyd, folk song collector, 74
- 6 October – Philip Green, film and TV composer and conductor, 71
- 8 October – Erik Routley, hymn writer and composer, 64
- 16 October – Rory McEwen, artist and musician, 50
- 29 October – William Lloyd Webber, organist and composer, 68
- 1 November
  - Dorothy Gow, composer, 89
  - Leighton Lucas, composer, 79
- 13 November – Chesney Allen, entertainer, 88
- 16 November – Arthur Askey, entertainer, 82
- 5 December – Caryl Brahms, musician and writer, 80
- 19 December – Lawrance Collingwood, conductor, composer and record producer, 95
- date unknown – Bob Roberts, folk singer, 74/75

== See also ==
- 1982 in British radio
- 1982 in British television
- 1982 in the United Kingdom
- List of British films of 1982
