= Keith Thomas (saxophonist) =

Keith Thomas (died 2022) was an English saxophonist. He is known for work as a session musician, including prominently with The Jam.

== Career ==
Thomas started playing saxophone with a South London based funk band called the Brothers of Funk, who resided and played in and around London's Old Kent Road. Playing with Goldsmiths College's big band run by Herman Wilson is where he met with various South London session saxophonists including Ray Carless and Roger Thomas.

Thomas, making his first album at FreeRange Studios, with sound engineer and record producer Marc Frank, was introduced to Robbie Vincent, who managed the R&B band Second Image. Thomas became a member of the band touring and playing on recordings from the 'Pinpoint the Feeling' era. During this time he met with John and Paul Weller to talk about collaborations on the Jam's musical project and the upcoming European gigs. Initially this was collaborating on existing Jam songs, with Second Image trumpeter Frank. When Frank was no longer able to continue, Thomas introduced Steve Nichol of Loose Ends to Paul, and Thomas and Nichol worked on The Gift album.

In February 1982, the first single from The Gift, the double A-sided "Town Called Malice"/"Precious" became a number one single in the UK Singles Chart and the band became the first group since the Beatles to play two songs on BBC's Top of the Pops. The Gift, released in March 1982, showcased the band's progression towards soul and became the group's first number one album in the UK Albums Chart.

Thomas worked on other singles such as "Just Who Is the 5 O'Clock Hero?", and on Extras, playing both saxophone and flute with background vocals on a number of songs until their dissolution, late in 1982.

On 7 March 2022, Paul Weller announced: Keith Thomas, a contributor to Jam recordings, had died. "It is with great regret to hear of the passing of our dear comrade Keith Thomas. Keith, along with Steve Nichol, played sax & flute with The Jam between 81 & 82. Very sad news. Bless you and thank you Keith. My deep sympathy to his family."

=== Bands ===
- Second Image
- Pressure Point
- Legacy
- Homeboys
- Dr Blackstein

=== Session work ===
- Loose Ends
- Heaven 17
- Julian Lennon
- Bananarama
