= Norwich (disambiguation) =

Norwich is a city and the county town of Norfolk, England.

- Norwich (constituency), former constituency

- Norwich North, successor
- Norwich South, successor

Norwich may also refer to:

== Places ==
- Norwich, Ontario, Canada
- Norwich Township (disambiguation)

=== United States ===
- Norwich, Connecticut

- Downtown Norwich Historic District, a historic district in Norwich, Connecticut

- Norwich, Kansas
- Norwich, Massachusetts
- Norwich, New York
- Norwich (town), New York
- Norwich, North Dakota
- Norwich, Ohio
- Norwich, Vermont, a town
  - Norwich (CDP), Vermont, the central village of the town
- Norwich, Roanoke, Virginia, a neighborhood in Roanoke, Virginia

- Norwich Historic District, a historic district in Roanoke, Virginia

== People ==
- Adam Heinrich Norwich (1771–1858), German trader and natural history specimen collector
- Julian of Norwich, 14th century, English mystic and writer
- John Julius Norwich (Lord) (1929-2018), member of the British Foreign Service, academic, historian, and writer

== Maritime ==
- HMS Norwich, the name of four ships of the Royal Navy
- USS Norwich, United States Navy ship, in service from 1861 to 1865

== Other uses ==
- Norwich (HM Prison), a prison of adult males and young offenders in Norwich, England
- Norwich Canary, a type of domestic canary
- Norwich school of painters, an art movement in Britain in the nineteenth-century
- Norwich Terrier, a breed of dog
- Norwich Union, a British insurance company
- Norwich University, a private military college in Northfield, Vermont
- NORWICH, a WWII postal acronym for "(K)nickers off ready when I come home"

== See also ==
- Norwich City (disambiguation)
