= 45 RPM =

45 RPM or 45 rpm may refer to:

== Vinyl record format ==
- Phonograph record
- Single (music), including the 45 rpm format

== Albums ==
- 45 RPM (album) or the title song, by Paul Van Dyk, 1994
- 45 rpm: The Singles, 1977–1979, by The Jam, 2001
- 45 rpm: The Singles, 1980–1982, by The Jam, 2001
- 45 RPM: The Singles of The The, 2002

== Other uses ==
- "45 RPM" (song), a 2004 song by The Poppy Fields (The Alarm)
- 45 rpm (TV series) or 45 Revoluciones, a 2019 Spanish Netflix series
