= List of British films of 1982 =

A list of films produced in the United Kingdom in 1982 (see 1982 in film):

== 1982 ==
| Title | Director | Cast | Genre | Notes |
|---|---|---|---|---|
1982
| Bad Blood | Mike Newell | Jack Thompson, Carol Burns | Thriller | Co-production with New Zealand |
| The Boys in Blue | Val Guest | Tommy Cannon, Bobby Ball | Comedy | |
| Brimstone and Treacle | Richard Loncraine | Sting, Denholm Elliott | Drama | |
| Britannia Hospital | Lindsay Anderson | Malcolm McDowell, Leonard Rossiter | Black comedy | |
| The Dark Crystal | Jim Henson, Frank Oz | Stephen Garlick, Lisa Maxwell | Fantasy | |
| The Draughtsman's Contract | Peter Greenaway | Anthony Higgins, Janet Suzman | Drama | |
| Enigma | Jeannot Szwarc | Martin Sheen, Sam Neill | Thriller | |
| Evil Under the Sun | Guy Hamilton | Peter Ustinov, James Mason, Maggie Smith | Mystery | |
| Experience Preferred... But Not Essential | Peter Duffell | Elizabeth Edmonds (actress), Sue Wallace | Drama | |
| Gandhi | Richard Attenborough | Ben Kingsley, Roshan Seth | Biopic | Won eight Academy Awards including Best Picture |
| Giro City | Karl Francis | Glenda Jackson, Jon Finch | Drama | |
| The Last Unicorn | Arthur Rankin Jr., Jules Bass | Alan Arkin, Jeff Bridges, Mia Farrow, Tammy Grimes, Robert Klein, Angela Lansbury, Christopher Lee, Keenan Wynn, Paul Frees, René Auberjonois | Animated fantasy | Co-production with the US and Japan |
| The Missionary | Richard Loncraine | Michael Palin, Maggie Smith | Comedy | |
| Monty Python Live at the Hollywood Bowl | Terry Hughes, Ian MacNaughton | The members of Monty Python, Carol Cleveland, Neil Innes | Comedy | |
| Moonlighting | Jerzy Skolimowski | Jeremy Irons | Drama | |
| Night Crossing | Delbert Mann | John Hurt, Jane Alexander | Drama | Co-production with the US |
| Nutcracker | Anwar Kawadri | Joan Collins, Carol White | Drama | |
| Pink Floyd – The Wall | Alan Parker | Bob Geldof | Musical | Film adaptation of Pink Floyd's album |
| The Plague Dogs | Martin Rosen | John Hurt, Christopher Benjamin | Animated/adventure | Co-production with the US |
| Privates on Parade | Michael Blakemore | John Cleese | Comedy | |
| The Return of the Soldier | Alan Bridges | Julie Christie, Alan Bates, Glenda Jackson | Drama | |
| The Scarlet Pimpernel | Clive Donner | Anthony Andrews, Jane Seymour | Drama | |
| The Sender | Roger Christian | Kathryn Harrold, Željko Ivanek | Horror | |
| Time Masters | René Laloux, Tibor Hernádi | Jean Valmont, Michel Elias, Frédéric Legros | Animated science fiction | Co-production with France, Switzerland, West Germany and Hungary |
| Trail of the Pink Panther | Blake Edwards | Peter Sellers, David Niven, Joanna Lumley, Herbert Lom | Comedy | |
| Tuxedo Warrior | Andrew Sinclair | John Wyman, Carol Royle | Action | |
| An Unsuitable Job for a Woman | Chris Petit | Billie Whitelaw, Paul Freeman | Crime | |
| Who Dares Wins | Ian Sharp | Lewis Collins, Judy Davis, Richard Widmark | Action/thriller | |

== See also ==
- 1982 in British music
- 1982 in British radio
- 1982 in British television
- 1982 in the United Kingdom
