= The Jam at the BBC =

Live album by The Jam
- Released: 21 May 2002
- Recorded: 2 May 1977 – 19 December 1981
- Genre: Rock
- Label: Polydor

The Jam chronology
Live Jam (1993)	The Jam at the BBC (2002)

Professional ratings
Review scores
Source	Rating
Allmusic	4/5 stars

The Jam at the BBC is a collection of Jam tracks that were performed in session at the BBC.

Disc 1

- Tracks 1 to 4 recorded for John Peel 26 April 1977
- Tracks 5 to 8 recorded for John Peel 19 July 1977
- Tracks 9 to 18 recorded in concert at the Paris Theatre, London 1 Jun 1978

Disc 2

- Tracks 1 to 4 recorded for John Peel 29 October 1979
- Tracks 5 to 8 recorded for 'Studio B15' live 25 October 1981
- Tracks 9 to 20 performed in concert at the Hippodrome, Golders Green 19 December 1981

Limited edition bonus disc

- Recorded in concert at the Rainbow Theatre, London, 4 December 1979

== Track listing ==
Disc one

1. "In the City"
2. "Art School"
3. "I've Changed My Address"
4. "The Modern World"
5. "All Around the World"
6. "London Girl"
7. "Bricks And Mortar"
8. "Carnaby Street"
9. "Billy Hunt"
10. "In The Street Today"
11. "The Combine"
12. "Sounds From The Street"
13. "Don't Tell Them You're Sane"
14. "The Modern World"
15. "'A' Bomb in Wardour Street"
16. "News of the World"
17. "Here Comes The Weekend"
18. "All Around the World"

Disc two

1. "Thick As Thieves"
2. "The Eton Rifles"
3. "Saturday's Kids"
4. "When You're Young"
5. "Absolute Beginners"
6. "Tales From The Riverbank"
7. "Funeral Pyre"
8. "Sweet Soul Music"
9. "The Gift" (Live)
10. "Down in the Tube Station at Midnight"
11. "Ghosts"
12. "Absolute Beginners"
13. "Tales From The Riverbank"
14. "Precious"
15. "Town Called Malice"
16. "In The Crowd"
17. "Circus"
18. "Pretty Green"
19. "Start!"
20. "Boy About Town"

Limited edition bonus disc

1. "Girl on the Phone"
2. "To Be Someone (Didn't We Have A Nice Time)"
3. "It's Too Bad"
4. "Burning Sky"
5. "Away From The Numbers"
6. "Smithers-Jones"
7. "The Modern World"
8. "Mr. Clean"
9. "The Butterfly Collector"
10. "Private Hell"
11. "Thick As Thieves"
12. "When You're Young"
13. "Strange Town"
14. "The Eton Rifles"
15. "Down in the Tube Station at Midnight"
16. "Saturday's Kids"
17. "All Mod Cons"
18. "David Watts"
