= 45 rpm: The Singles, 1980–1982 =

Box set by The Jam
- Released: 30 April 2001
- Recorded: 1980–1982
- Genres: Punk rock, rock
- Label: Polydor
- Producer: The Jam

The Jam chronology
45 rpm: The Singles, 1977-1979 (2001)	45 rpm: The Singles, 1980–1982 (2001)	The Sound of the Jam (2002)

Professional ratings
Review scores
Source	Rating
AllMusic	4/5 stars

45 rpm: The Singles, 1980–1982 is a box set compilation by British rock band The Jam. The set contains nine singles released by the band between 1980 and 1982 in remastered formats with original artwork and reproduction sleeves.

== Disc listings ==
=== Disc one ===
1. "Going Underground"
2. "Dreams of Children"
3. "Away from the Numbers" (live at the Rainbow)
4. "Modern World" (live at the Rainbow)
5. "Down in the Tube Station at Midnight" (live at the Rainbow)
6. "Going Underground" (video)

=== Disc two ===
1. "Start!"
2. "Liza Radley"
3. "Start!" (video)

=== Disc three ===
1. "That's Entertainment"
2. "Down in the Tube Station at Midnight" (live)
3. "That's Entertainment" (video)

=== Disc four ===
1. "Funeral Pyre"
2. "Disguises"
3. "Funeral Pyre" (video)

=== Disc five ===
1. "Absolute Beginners"
2. "Tales from the Riverbank"
3. "Absolute Beginners" (video)

=== Disc six ===
1. "Town Called Malice"
2. "Precious"
3. "Town Called Malice" (video)

=== Disc seven ===
1. "Just Who Is the 5 O'Clock Hero?"
2. "The Great Depression"

=== Disc eight ===
1. "The Bitterest Pill (I Ever Had to Swallow)"
2. "Pity Poor Alfie/Fever"
3. "The Bitterest Pill (I Ever Had to Swallow)" (video)

=== Disc nine ===
1. "Beat Surrender"
2. "Shopping"
3. "Move on Up"
4. "Stoned Out of My Mind / War"
