= Happy Since I Met You =

- VHS cover
- Genre: Comedy
- Created by: Victoria Wood
- Directed by: Baz Taylor
- Starring: Julie Walters; Duncan Preston
- Country of origin: United Kingdom
- No. of series: 1
- No. of episodes: 1

Production
- Producer: Peter Eckersley
- Running time: 52 min.

Original release
- Network: ITV
- Release: 9 August 1981

Happy Since I Met You is a television play written by Victoria Wood, and broadcast on ITV on 9 August 1981.

It stars Julie Walters and Duncan Preston and was directed by Baz Taylor as part of ITV's Screenplay series. In Happy Since I Met You, Duncan Preston, who would later become one of her regular co-stars, worked with Victoria Wood for the first time. It was the last full-length drama by Wood to be televised for some years, the next being Pat and Margaret (1994). The film was notable for early TV appearances in minor roles by rising stars Maggie Steed, Tracey Ullman and George Costigan. Although Wood does not appear in the film, she sings several of her compositions including the opening song and other songs performed over the on-screen action.

== Plot ==
The story takes place over three consecutive Christmases. At the first, drama teacher Frances is defiantly single and enjoying living alone, but shortly after spending Christmas with her family, she meets an actor, Jim and they begin dating. By the next Christmas, they have moved in together and seem to be settling with their relationship, but Frances becomes frustrated with losing her independence and by the third Christmas, their cohabitation has driven her to anger and she leaves Jim after an explosive argument. Jim tracks her down at the train station as Frances attempts to get away to find solitude, but she realises she does love Jim and the film ends with them agreeing to try again.

== Cast ==
- Julie Walters as Frances
- Duncan Preston as Jim
- Kathryn Apanowicz as Judith
- Christine Moore as Marie
- Sue Wallace as Olwen
- Louise Cullinan as Gemma
- Tracey Ullman as Karen
- Barbara New as Mum
- Jim Bowen as Dad
- Marjorie Sudell as Auntie
- Carol Leader as Mary
- Alison Skilbeck as Elaine
- Sidney Livingstone as Dennis
- Lottie Ward as Moira
- Norman Mills as Alec
- Nellie Hanham as Margot
- Maggie Steed as Ginny
- George Costigan as Ted
- Judy Lloyd as Beverly
- Sandra Voe as Headmistress
- Fidelis Morgan as Nun
- Eileen Mayers as Neighbour
- Maggie Lane as Cashier
- Monica Lewis as Customer
- Meretta Elliot as Girl
- Phil Kernott as Attendant
- Alison Stirrup as Woman
- June Dixon, Rebecca Leach and Alison Attenborough as Schoolgirls

== Production ==
Costume: Diane Holmes
Make-up: Sarah Horseman
Casting Director: Priscilla John
Film Editor: Bob Morton
Designer: Colin Rees
Producer: Peter Eckersley
Director: Baz Taylor

Music & Lyrics by Victoria Wood, arranged and conducted by Jim Parker.

== Critical reception ==
Reviews were mixed, with Mary Kenny in the Daily Mail full of praise for dialogue which combined the idiomatic drollness of Les Dawson with the refinement of Jean Anouilh; whereas The Guardian's Stanley Reynolds thought it "padded out with vulgar speeches...Lines delivered as if they were heroic truths, as if they were not only great gems of wit but also terribly socially significant." More recently, Screenonline called the play "a slight but touching romance that was as much about the downs as the ups of young love."
