= Norwich City (disambiguation) =

Norwich City is an English professional football club.

Norwich City may also refer to:

- Norwich, the city in Norfolk, England
- Norwich City, an English former railway station
- Norwich City Council, the local authority for the city of Norwich, England
- Norwich City L.F.C., an English women's football club
- SS Norwich City, a British merchant ship built in 1911

== See also ==
- Norwich (disambiguation)
