= Live Jam =

1993 live album by The Jam

Live album by The Jam
- Released: 25 October 1993
- Recorded: 2 December 1979 – 2 December 1982
- Genre: Rock
- Length: 75:50
- Label: Polydor
- Producer: Peter Wilson, Vic Coppersmith-Heaven

The Jam chronology
Dig The New Breed (1982)	Live Jam (1993)	The Jam at the BBC (2002)

Professional ratings
Review scores
Source	Rating
Allmusic	3.5/5 stars

Live Jam was a live album released in 1993 by Polydor after The Jam's split in 1982.

== Track listing ==
All tracks composed by Paul Weller; except where indicated

1. "The Modern World"
2. "Billy Hunt"
3. "Thick as Thieves"
4. "Burning Sky"
5. "Mr. Clean"
6. "Smithers-Jones" (Bruce Foxton)
7. "Little Boy Soldiers"
8. "The Eton Rifles"
9. "Away from the Numbers"
10. "Down in the Tube Station at Midnight"
11. "Strange Town"
12. "When You're Young"
13. "'A' Bomb in Wardour Street"
14. "Pretty Green"
15. "Boy About Town"
16. "Man in the Corner Shop"
17. "David Watts" (Ray Davies)
18. "Funeral Pyre" (Paul Weller, Bruce Foxton, Rick Buckler)
19. "Move on Up" (Curtis Mayfield)
20. "Carnation"
21. "The Butterfly Collector"
22. "Precious"
23. "Town Called Malice"
24. "Heat Wave" (Holland-Dozier-Holland)

"The Modern World", "Away from the Numbers" and "Down in the Tube Station at Midnight" featured on the bonus disc of the "Going Underground" single in 1980. "Town Called Malice" featured on the 12" single of the same name in 1982.
