= Gillian Reynolds =

English radio critic and journalist (born 1935)

Gillian Reynolds CBE
- Born: Gillian Morton; 15 November 1935 (age 90); Liverpool, England
- Education: St Anne's College, Oxford
- Occupations: Radio critic and journalist
- Employers: The Guardian (1967–1974); Radio City (1974–1975); The Daily Telegraph (1975–2018); The Sunday Times (2018–2021)
- Spouse: Stanley Reynolds (m. 1958; div. 1975)
- Children: 3

Gillian Reynolds (née Morton; born 15 November 1935) is an English radio critic and journalist. After writing for The Guardian from 1967 to 1974, she was the radio critic for The Daily Telegraph for more than 42 years, from 1975 to 2018. She then continued her career at The Sunday Times, where she wrote about radio until 2021.

== Early life ==
Morton's father was a seaman while her mother was a market trader. She was raised in a council house in Norris Green, Liverpool. She was educated at Broad Square County Primary School and Liverpool Institute High School for Girls, followed by St Anne's College, Oxford, where she read English. After leaving Oxford University, she undertook postgraduate research at Mount Holyoke College in the United States for a year.

== Career ==
Reynolds became the radio critic of The Daily Telegraph in 1975; she had previously held the same post at The Guardian for seven years from 1967. In between these two jobs, she was the first Programme Controller of Radio City in Liverpool in 1974, the first woman in the UK to hold such a post. "I wasn't good at it though I gave Alan Bleasdale his first full-time writing gig", she said in 2018. Later, Reynolds was involved in the group organising the events in Liverpool while the city was European City of Culture in 2008.

Reynolds is a Fellow of The Radio Academy, a trustee of the National Museum in Liverpool, a Fellow of the Royal Television Society and an Honorary Fellow of her old Oxford college, St Anne's. Until January 2009, she chaired the Charles Parker Archive Trust at Birmingham Central Library. She was a member of the Booker Prize judging panel in 1986. In the 2001 edition of the Wisden Cricketers' Almanack, she reviewed the cricket books published in the year 2000. Until October 2019, she was a member of the Advisory Board of the National Science and Media Museum in Bradford, Yorkshire.

Reynolds celebrated her 40 years with The Daily Telegraph by reporting in December 2015: "Radio is more popular with BBC audiences than TV, delivering 43 percent of the BBC's total audience" [the BBC being the UK's public broadcaster, then in its ninth decade]. She argued that "radio is perceived as a medium of the future not a dusty relic", crediting digital technology, interactivity by audiences and the huge breadth of creativity radio offers. She wrote: "There are ways of telling a story on radio... that audio does better than any other medium, more intimately and with more immediate impact."

After 42 years at the same title, in January 2018 Reynolds left The Daily Telegraph for The Sunday Times, where she continued reviewing radio. Then aged 82, she told Julia Llewellyn Smith in an interview: "It's a strike against ageism; proof that some employers value the benefits of long experience over the bouncy energy of youth". Her last column for The Sunday Times was published on 2 May 2021 presaging further changes within News UK, and with a promise that Reynolds would reappear elsewhere.

== Personal life ==
The former Gillian Morton married American journalist Stanley Reynolds in 1958 after they met the previous year during Morton's period in the United States. The couple had three sons, but divorced in 1975. It was an unhappy marriage; she was a victim of domestic violence. "When sober he was lovely, when drunk monstrous," she said in 2018. She returned to London without the children because Reynolds was threatening to murder her. She eventually gained custody of her sons.

Reynolds was appointed Member of the Order of the British Empire (MBE) in the 1999 Birthday Honours for services to journalism and Commander of the Order of the British Empire (CBE) in the 2020 New Year Honours for services to radio.

In June 2018, she appeared as the castaway on BBC Radio 4's Desert Island Discs, when her selections included recordings by Earth, Wind & Fire, Miles Davis, Ray Charles, Shostakovitch, Beethoven and Richard Burton. Her luxury item was an endless supply of blended Scotch.
