= 1982 in British radio =

This is a list of events in British radio during 1982.

== Events ==
=== January ===
- 2 January – Sue Townsend's comic character Adrian Mole is introduced to a national audience in a radio play, The Diary of Nigel Mole Aged 13¾ [sic.], in BBC Radio 4's Thirty-Minute Theatre strand.
- 10 January – Tommy Vance replaces Tony Blackburn as host of Radio 1's Top 40 show.
- 18 January – Gloria Hunniford joins BBC Radio 2 to host the lunchtime show.

=== February ===
- 27 February – BBC Radio 1 broadcasts the final editions of Junior Choice and Playground.

=== March ===
- 1 March – Chiltern Radio's broadcast area expands when it begins broadcasting to the Bedford area.
- 6 March – Following the ending of Junior Choice, the BBC Radio 1 weekend breakfast show is renamed The Saturday Show/The Sunday Show. Children's requests continue to be a mainstay of the renamed show and Maggie Philbin and Keith Chegwin join Tony Blackburn as co-presenters.

=== April ===
- April – At the start of the Falklands War, Portsmouth-based Radio Victory begins 24-hour broadcasting.
- 9–10 April – BBC Radio 1 broadcasts a non-stop Marathon Music Quiz. Featuring two teams, Radio 1 and the Music Industry, it is scheduled to run continuously for 26 hours and 385 minutes, with Mike Read as quizmaster for the entire quiz. The overnight portion is broadcast live.

=== May ===
- 25 May – BBC Radio Carlisle expands to cover all of Cumbria and is renamed accordingly. As part of the expansion, BBC Radio Furness launches as an opt-out service.
- 30–31 May – BBC Radio York is permitted to provide a temporary service to cover Pope John Paul II's visit to York. The service, which runs for just over 24 hours, operates on what will become BBC Radio York's MW frequency when the station launches in July 1983, and is simulcast on BBC Radio Newcastle, BBC Radio Cleveland, BBC Radio Leeds, BBC Radio Humberside and BBC Radio Sheffield.

=== June to August ===
- No events.

=== September ===
- 20 September – Former BRMB presenter Ed Doolan joins the lineup at BBC Radio WM.
- 28 September – The BBC World Service becomes available to UK listeners for the first time, albeit only in southeast England, following the move of transmissions of the World Service from Crowborough to Orfordness.

=== October ===
- 1 October – After 32 years on air, Listen with Mother is broadcast for the final time. It is replaced by a shorter five-minute lunchtime programme called Listening Corner.

=== November ===
- 6 November – Saxon Radio begins broadcasting to the Bury St. Edmunds area. This is the first station to network most of its output from another, in this case, Radio Orwell in Ipswich.
- Undated in November – Christa Ackroyd becomes the UK's first female radio news editor when she takes over the news editor role at Radio Aire.

=== December ===
- 3 December – BBC Radio 1 and 2 simulcast for the final time.
- 4 December – The transmission time that BBC Radio 1 lost in March 1980 is regained. Programmes once again begin at 6 am with Mike Smith returning to the station – he had been a presenter and producer in the mid 1970s – to present the new weekday early show. Weekend early shows are introduced, and the station also recommences Saturday evening broadcasting with Janice Long and Gary Davies joining to present the new shows. Programming is also extended by two hours on Sunday evenings with Annie Nightingale's request show returning to the airwaves after a nine-year hiatus. Thus, Radio 1 is now on air daily from 6 am until midnight.
- 31 December – Regional programming on BBC Radio 4 ends with the final edition of Morning Sou'West, which broadcasts ahead of the launch of BBC Radio Devon and BBC Radio Cornwall.

== Station debuts ==
- 23 February – Moray Firth Radio
- 15 March – BBC Radio Guernsey
- 16 March – BBC Radio Jersey
- 1 May – BBC Radio Cambridgeshire
- 25 May – BBC Radio Furness
- 4 October – Radio Wyvern
- 5 October – Red Rose Radio
- 12 October – Wiltshire Radio
- 6 November – Saxon Radio

== Programme debuts ==
- C'mon Midffîld! on BBC Radio Cymru (transfers to television 1988)
- The Random Jottings of Hinge and Bracket on BBC Radio 2 (1982–1989)
- December – Paddington Bear on BBC Radio 4 (1982)

== Continuing radio programmes ==
=== 1940s ===
- Sunday Half Hour (1940–2018)
- Desert Island Discs (1942–Present)
- Down Your Way (1946–1992)
- Letter from America (1946–2004)
- Woman's Hour (1946–Present)
- A Book at Bedtime (1949–Present)

=== 1950s ===
- The Archers (1950–Present)
- The Today Programme (1957–Present)
- Sing Something Simple (1959–2001)
- Your Hundred Best Tunes (1959–2007)

=== 1960s ===
- Farming Today (1960–Present)
- In Touch (1961–Present)
- The World at One (1965–Present)
- The Official Chart (1967–Present)
- Just a Minute (1967–Present)
- The Living World (1968–Present)
- The Organist Entertains (1969–2018)

=== 1970s ===
- PM (1970–Present)
- Start the Week (1970–Present)
- Week Ending (1970–1998)
- You and Yours (1970–Present)
- I'm Sorry I Haven't a Clue (1972–Present)
- Good Morning Scotland (1973–Present)
- Kaleidoscope (1973–1998)
- Newsbeat (1973–Present)
- The News Huddlines (1975–2001)
- File on 4 (1977–Present)
- Money Box (1977–Present)
- The News Quiz (1977–Present)
- Breakaway (1979–1998)
- Feedback (1979–Present)
- The Food Programme (1979–Present)
- Science in Action (1979–Present)

=== 1980s ===
- Radio Active (1980–1987)

== Ending this year ==
- 27 February – Junior Choice (launched as Children's Favourites in 1954)
- 1 October – Listen with Mother (1950–1982)

== Births ==
- 4 May – John Robins, comedian and radio presenter
- 25 September – Matt Chorley, political journalist and broadcaster
- Unknown – Susanne Courtney, singer and radio personality

== Deaths ==
- 26 June – Sandy Powell, comedian (born 1900)
- 16 November – Arthur Askey, comedian (born 1900)

== See also ==
- 1982 in British music
- 1982 in British television
- 1982 in the United Kingdom
- List of British films of 1982
