= Stanley Reynolds =

- Born: Stanley Ambrose Harrington Reynolds; November 27, 1934; Holyoke, Massachusetts, U.S.
- Died: November 27, 2016 (aged 82)
- Occupations: Journalist; author; critic
- Spouse(s): Gillian Morton (m. 1958; div. 1975) Jane McLoughlin (m. 2004)
- Children: 3
- Parent(s): Ambrose Harrington Reynolds; Irene Ducharme

Stanley Ambrose Harrington Reynolds (November 27, 1934 – November 27, 2016) was an American journalist, author, and critic who spent most of his life in the UK.

Reynolds was born in Holyoke, Massachusetts on November 27, 1934 to Ambrose Harrington Reynolds, a sales manager for the R. J. Reynolds Tobacco Company, and Irene Ducharme, who was French-Canadian. He was raised as a Catholic, and spoke only French until he was four. He served in the US military with the First Infantry Division. He met his first wife, Gillian Morton, in Holyoke; she was from Liverpool and was spending a year studying at Mount Holyoke College. The couple moved to the UK together, where they married in 1958. They returned to the US for a year, and Reynolds worked as a reporter for The Providence Journal in Rhode Island, but the couple had returned to the UK by 1960.

Reynolds worked for The Guardian in the 1960s, and published his first novel, Better Dead than Red, in 1964; it was praised by Anthony Burgess as "savagely funny". He also wrote the lyrics for a production of George Bernard Shaw's Androcles and the Lion. He became The Times television reviewer in 1972. By this time, he had turned freelance, and wrote for The Guardian, The Times, and Punch, where he took a job as literary editor in 1980. Around 1980, he made a BBC documentary called Great Little Railways, about a trip through the Ecuadorean Andes. Later he contributed to The European.

His first marriage ended in divorce in 1975. In an interview in 2018, his first wife, the journalist Gillian Reynolds, reported that she was the victim of domestic violence. "When sober he was lovely, when drunk monstrous", she said. She gained custody of the couple's three sons. He married Jane McLoughlin in 2004. He wrote crime novels included Death Dyed Blonde, which appeared in 2008. He was a notoriously heavy drinker, but gave up alcohol in 1984. He had a serious heart attack in 2003 and became increasingly disabled, till he was unable to walk. He died on November 27, 2016.
