= Norwich Township =

Norwich Township may refer to the following places:

== Canada ==
- Norwich Township, Ontario

== United States ==
- Norwich Township, Missaukee County, Michigan
- Norwich Township, Newaygo County, Michigan
- Norwich Township, McHenry County, North Dakota
- Norwich Township, Franklin County, Ohio
- Norwich Township, Huron County, Ohio
- Norwich Township, Pennsylvania
