= Adam Norwich =

German invertebrate collector (1771–1858)

Adam Heinrich Norwich
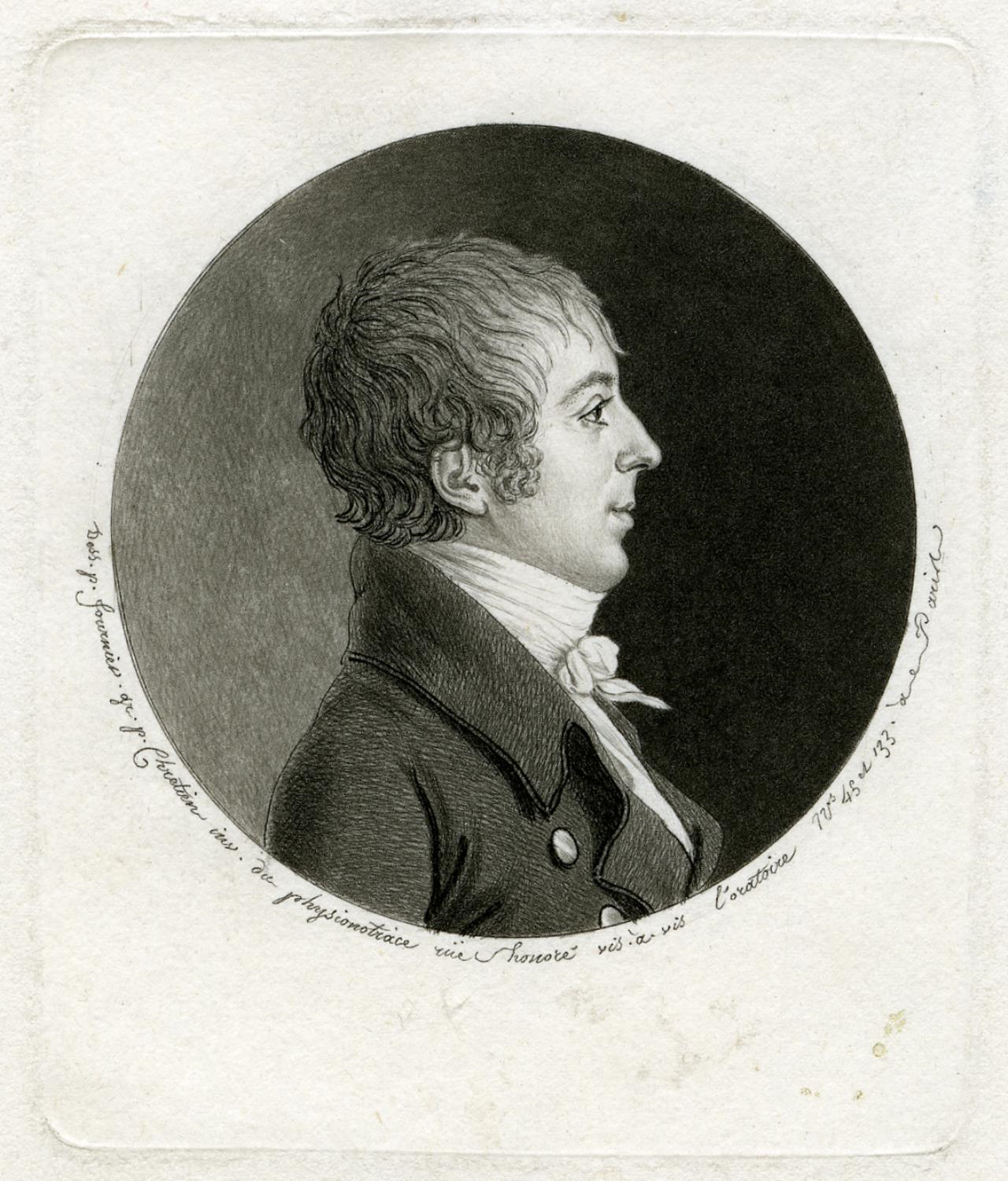
- A physiognotrace made by Jean Simon Fournier around 1800
- Born: May 28, 1771; Bremen, Germany
- Died: February 28, 1858 (aged 86); Bremen
- Known for: Collection of insects and mollusks
- Scientific career
- Fields: Entomology, Malacology

Adam Heinrich Norwich (28 May 1771 – 28 February 1858) was a German merchant and a collector of insect and mollusc specimens. His collections of about 4000 specimens are now in the Overseas Museum, Bremen (Überseemuseum).

Norwich was born in Bremen but lived in England for a while. His uncle and later stepfather was Georg Heinrich Norwich (1757-1815), the founder of a seafaring school in Bremen. After the death of his uncle in 1815 Norwich moved to Bremen and established a large collection of shells and insects. His cousin Galenus Norwich (1787–1860) was also a major collector and both collections finally went to the natural science society and are now held in the Überseemuseum.
