= Sue Wallace =

British character actress

Sue Wallace is a British character actress.

== Education ==
Wallace studied drama and English at the University of Birmingham.

== Career ==
Wallace started her career as a teacher. Wallace went on to have a lengthy career on television and the stage since the early 1980s in among others, Juliet Bravo, Bergerac, Making Out, The Bill, Common as Muck, Heartbeat and Doctors.

Wallace appeared in different roles in various television works by Victoria Wood, including Screenplay: Happy Since I Met You in 1981, Victoria Wood as Seen on TV in the mid-1980s, the television film Pat and Margaret in 1994, one episode of Dinnerladies in 1998 and finally in Wood's television historical drama film Housewife, 49 in 2006.

Film roles include Is There Anybody There? and as Janet in I Give It a Year.

== Filmography ==
=== Films ===
- 1977 She Loves Me
- 1982 Experience Preferred...But Not Essential - Mavis
- 1985 Blue Money - Letty.
- 2007 Is Anybody There? - Mrs. Hitler.
- 2012 I Give It a Year - Janet.
