= Maurice Blower =

English composer (1894–1982)

Maurice Sibley Blower (27 September 1894 – 4 July 1982) was an English musician, pianist and composer.

== Life ==
Blower was born in Croydon, and was a choirboy in London. He studied at the Royal Academy of Music. Before World War One he worked for a time at the National Bank of India. During the war he served with the East Surrey Regiment, and in 1917 was taken prisoner at St Quentin.

After the war he received further musical training at the RAF School of Music (attached to the Guildhall School of Music and directed by Henry Walford Davies), the Guildford School of Music, and with Harold Darke at Queen's College, Oxford, where he received his music doctorate in 1929. For his D.Mus. he submitted two choral works: The Lady of Shallott and Message of the March Wind.

Blower was long associated with Petersfield in Hampshire, where he gave piano lessons, directed choirs and acted as secretary to the Petersfield Music Festival for five decades. He married Rosalind Hill (née Liddell, 1902–1985) in St Luke's Church, Milland in 1938 and they moved to the nearby village of Rake in West Sussex, on the border of Sussex and Hampshire, where he taught at a local school. They stayed there for the rest of their lives. Their address in the 1940s was Little Langley Farm, Rake, where their son Thomas was born in 1938.

Blower died in Petersfield at the age of 88. His wife Rosalind died three years later.

== Music ==
The music published in his lifetime was mostly songs and brief choral works. But there were also orchestral works, such as the Symphony in C, composed in 1939, the three movement Eclogue for Horn and Strings (1950) and the Horn Concerto (1951). These three pieces were recorded on the Cameo label in 2014 and have since been re-issued on Lyrita. Both horn works were premiered by Dennis Brain, the first in Petersfield, May 1951, repeated in London two years later, and the second in 1953, also in Petersfield. The symphony was only recovered in 2002, and it was re-constructed by his son Thomas Blower and the conductor Peter Craddock, who conducted the first performance at Ferneham Hall, Fareham on 29 March 2008 with the Havant Symphony Orchestra.

His other works include a Concertino for bassoon and orchestra (1956), the Two Pieces for small orchestra, the Romantic Suite for strings, and the orchestral impression On the Wicklow Hills. His arrangement of Purcell's Come Ye Sons of Art (for SSA and piano or string accompaniment) remains in print.
