= West Country Tales =

BBC television series

West Country Tales is a British television anthology series co-produced by BBC South West and Doublejay Films, based on supernatural stories sent in by viewers in response to a BBC appeal, with 14 of them adapted into TV scripts.

A book was also released to accompany the first series with adaptations of all the episodes by various authors and including one additional story, "Waiting for Simon", which was not filmed.

== Episodes ==
=== Series 1 ===
1. "The Sabbatical" (Jan 25, 1982)
2. "The Poacher" (Feb 1, 1982)
3. "The Breakdown" (Feb 8, 1982)
4. "The White Bird of Laughter" (Feb 15, 1982)
5. "The Visitor" (Feb 22, 1982)
6. "The Beast" (Mar 1, 1982)
7. "Miss Constantine" (Mar 8, 1982)

=== Series 2 ===
1. "With Love, Belinda" (May 12, 1983)
2. "The Wit to Woo" (May 19, 1983)
3. "Tell It to the Marines" (May 26, 1983)
4. "Ring a Ring a Rosy" (Jun 9, 1983)
5. "Sarah" (Jun 16, 1983)
6. "The Little Bounder" (Jun 23, 1983)
7. "The Healer" (Jun 30, 1983)
