= Experience Preferred... But Not Essential =

- Country of origin: United Kingdom

Production
- Running time: 1 hour, 20 minutes
- Production company: Goldcrest Films

Original release
- Network: Channel 4
- Release: 20 December 1982

Experience Preferred.... But Not Essential is a 1982 British TV film directed by Peter Duffell as part of the First Love series. It is set in a Welsh hotel in 1962 where Annie, a student, arrives to spend the summer as a waitress.

== Production ==
Like the other First Love films, Experience preferred.... was shot "in about twenty days for well under £0.5m" though the overall budget was £505,000. Goldcrest Films invested £480,000 in it and received £728,000 earning them a profit of £248,000.

== Cast ==
IMDb lists the full cast. The BoxOffice review lists those "starring".

=== Starring ===
- Elizabeth Edmonds (actress) as Annie
- Sue Wallace as Mavis, a waitress, Annie's room-mate
- Ron Bain as Mike, the chef who Annie develops a relationship with

=== Other cast members ===
- Geraldine Griffiths as Doreen, a waitress
- Karen Meagher as Paula, a waitress
- Maggie Wilkinson as Arlene
- Alun Lewis as Hywel
- Robert Blythe as Ivan
- Roy Heather as Wally
- Peter Doran as Dai
- Arwen Holm as Helen
- Sion Tudor Owen as Nin
- Robert Gwilym as Gareth
- Mostyn Evans as Now
- Paul Haley as Mr. Howard
- Margo Jenkins as Mrs. Howard
- Jerry Brooke as Gaiety M. C.

== Reception ==
Variety said “generally the picture looks a treat”. Screen International said that UA Classics had great success with Experience Preferred.... But Not Essential in contrast to P'Tang Yang Kipperbang. In 1984, Gavin Millar said in Sight & Sound that it "had them queueing round the block in New York". Looking back in 1987, David Rose (interviewed by Nicolas Kent) in Sight & Sound described it as “one of Channel 4’s first big successes in America”. Rick Marx, writing in BoxOffice, found it "utterly charming" but he found the "Scottish accents ... often almost impossible to interpret".
