= Murun Buchstansangur =

- Murun Buchstansangur
- Genre: Animation
- Written by: Timothy Forder
- Directed by: Timothy Forder
- Voices of: Timothy Forder
- Country of origin: United Kingdom
- Original language: English
- No. of episodes: 53

Production
- Producer: Mary Swindale
- Running time: 5 minutes
- Production company: Bevanfield Films

Original release
- Network: Channel 4
- Release: 14 November 1982 – 8 July 1989

Murun Buchstansangur is a series of animated shorts produced by Bevanfield Films for the TV station Channel 4 in the United Kingdom. It comprised fifty-three episodes; each was written, directed and narrated by Timothy Forder.

== Content ==
The title character was a small blue-grey creature who lived under the kitchen cupboard of a house in an unspecified town. The series was notable for its oblique, downbeat tone. Perhaps unsurprisingly, given his surroundings, Murun is a somewhat melancholy, philosophical character, though he is not lonely – in fact he has quite a large number of friends, neighbours, family members and acquaintances. Rather than Murun having exciting adventures, the narrative of each episode usually centres on a problem or dilemma that Murun would ponder, sometimes helped by his friends and relatives.

The first episode was shown in 1982; fifty-three were made, and the animation was repeated until 1996, mostly as filler material in scheduling gaps between other programmes. The first few series were created by Bevanfield Films, while later series were made by Hierographics Production Studio in Soho.

== Episodes ==
=== Series 1 (1982–1983) ===
No. overall	No. in season	Title	Original release date
1	1	"Episode 1.1"	14 November 1982
2	2	"Episode 1.2"	21 November 1982
3	3	"Episode 1.3"	28 November 1982
4	4	"Episode 1.4"	6 November 1983
5	5	"Episode 1.5"	13 November 1983
6	6	"Episode 1.6"	13 November 1983
7	7	"Episode 1.7"	20 November 1983
8	8	"Episode 1.8"	20 November 1983
9	9	"Episode 1.9"	27 November 1983
10	10	"Episode 1.10"	27 November 1983
11	11	"Episode 1.11"	4 December 1983
12	12	"Episode 1.12"	11 December 1983
13	13	"Episode 1.13"	18 December 1983

=== Series 2 (1985) ===
No. overall	No. in season	Title	Original release date
14	1	"Episode 2.1"	5 October 1985
15	2	"Episode 2.2"	12 October 1985
16	3	"Episode 2.3"	14 October 1985
17	4	"Episode 2.4"	19 October 1985
18	5	"Episode 2.5"	21 October 1985
19	6	"Episode 2.6"	26 October 1985
20	7	"Episode 2.7"	28 October 1985
21	8	"Episode 2.8"	2 November 1985
22	9	"Episode 2.9"	4 November 1985
23	10	"Episode 2.10"	9 November 1985
24	11	"Episode 2.11"	11 November 1985
25	12	"Episode 2.12"	18 November 1985
26	13	"Episode 2.13"	25 November 1985
27	14	"Episode 2.14"	2 December 1985

=== Series 3 (1986–1987) ===
No. overall	No. in season	Title	Original release date
28	1	"Episode 3.1"	29 July 1986
29	2	"Episode 3.2"	5 August 1986
30	3	"Episode 3.3"	12 August 1986
31	4	"Episode 3.4"	19 August 1986
32	5	"Episode 3.5"	26 August 1986
33	6	"Episode 3.6"	18 November 1986
34	7	"Episode 3.7"	25 November 1986
35	8	"Episode 3.8"	2 December 1986
36	9	"Episode 3.9"	9 December 1986
37	10	"Episode 3.10"	16 December 1986
38	11	"Episode 3.11"	6 January 1987
39	12	"Episode 3.12"	13 January 1987

=== Series 4 (1989) ===
No. overall	No. in season	Title	Original release date
40	1	"Episode 4.1"	8 April 1989
41	2	"Episode 4.2"	15 April 1989
42	3	"Episode 4.3"	22 April 1989
43	4	"Episode 4.4"	29 April 1989
44	5	"Episode 4.5"	6 May 1989
45	6	"Episode 4.6"	13 May 1989
46	7	"Episode 4.7"	20 May 1989
47	8	"Episode 4.8"	27 May 1989
48	9	"Episode 4.9"	3 June 1989
49	10	"Episode 4.10"	10 June 1989
50	11	"Episode 4.11"	17 June 1989
51	12	"Episode 4.12"	24 June 1989
52	13	"Episode 4.13"	1 July 1989
53	14	"Episode 4.14"	8 July 1989
