= Breakfast with Brisbane =

- Created by: BBC Sport
- Presented by: Desmond Lynam
- Country of origin: United Kingdom
- Original language: English

Production
- Running time: 100–120 minutes

Original release
- Network: BBC1
- Release: 3 October – 9 October 1982

Breakfast with Brisbane was a television programme which provided live and recorded coverage of the 1982 Commonwealth Games. The programme was named after the location where the Games were being held.

The programme was broadcast from around 7 am until around 9 am and was presented by Desmond Lynam with studio analysis of the athletics events from Steve Ovett. David Icke presented round-ups of the latest Games news at 7.30 am and at 8.30 am. The programme also provided regular summaries of national and international news from the BBC Newsroom.

The main focus of the programme was to provide live coverage of the athletics and the first edition of the programme was on the opening day of the track and field programme.

Breakfast with Brisbane was broadcast just over three months prior to the launch of permanent weekday breakfast television on BBC1.
