= Dead Ernest =

1982 UK television series

Dead Ernest is a 1982 British supernatural sitcom set in heaven, starring Andrew Sachs in the role of Ernest Springer. It was broadcast on ITV and first aired on 15 February 1982, lasting only seven episodes. It was the first sitcom made by then newly formed Central Television.

== Plot ==
Ernest Springer, a teacher, wins half a million pounds on the football pools, while celebrating in the stands he is killed by a blow between the eyes from a stray champagne bottle cork. He subsequently ascends to heaven. Although the authorities in heaven admit that his death was an administrative error (he had been scheduled to die in his bed in Lyme Regis in 2007), as his kidneys have already been donated to a bus conductor he cannot go back down to earth.
