= World War II postal acronyms =

Personal correspondence code used by servicemen

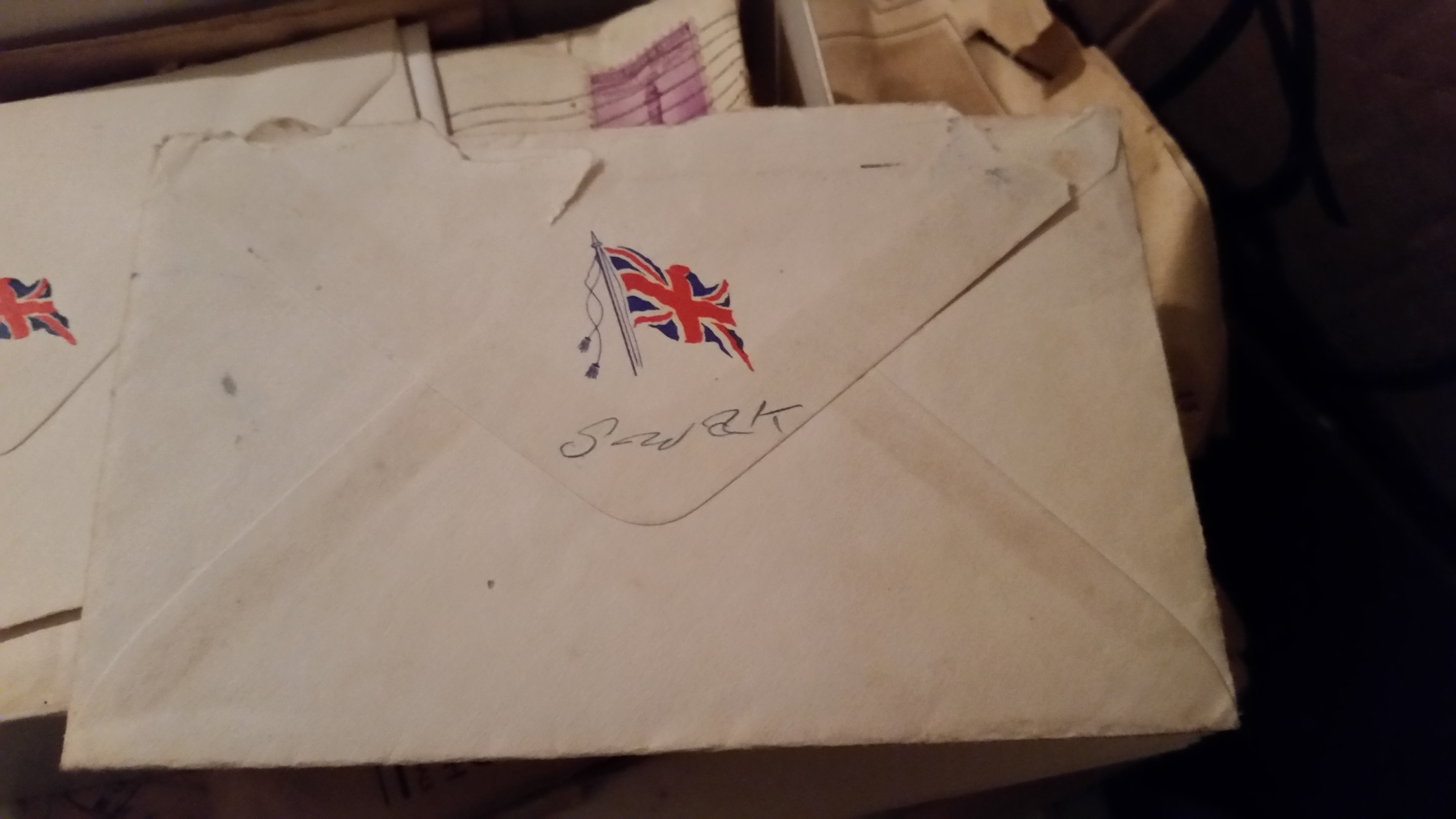
S.W.A.K. on the back of a letter c. 1942

World War II postal acronyms were first used to convey messages between servicemen and their sweethearts back home. They were usually written on the back of an envelope.

The acronyms, possibly including some more recent additions, include:

- S.W.A.L.K. — Sealed With A Loving Kiss. A variant is S.W.A.K. ("Sealed With A Kiss").
- V.E.N.I.C.E. — Very Excited Now I Caress Everywhere, Venice
- E.G.Y.P.T. — Eager to Grab/Eagerly Groping/Grasping Your Pretty Tits, Anglo-Egyptian Sudan, Egypt
- B.U.R.M.A. — Be Undressed/Upstairs Ready My Angel, Myanmar / Burma
- R.A.D.I.O. Romance And Delight I Offer (often used with B.U.R.M.A.)
- S.I.A.M. Sexual Intercourse At Midnight (used with B.U.R.M.A. as in B.U.R.M.A. 4 S.I.A.M.), Rattanakosin Kingdom
- H.O.L.L.A.N.D. — Hope Our Love Lives/Lasts And Never Dies, The Netherlands
- I.T.A.L.Y. — I Trust And Love You or I'm Thinking About Loving You, Italy
- F.R.A.N.C.E. — Friendship Remains And Never Can End, France
- M.A.L.A.Y.A. — My Ardent Lips Await Your Arrival, British Malaya
- B.E.L.F.A.S.T. - Be Ever Loving, Faithful And Stay True, Belfast, Northern Ireland
- N.O.R.W.I.C.H - (K)Nickers Off Ready When I Come Home, Norwich, United Kingdom
- L.O.W.E.S.T.O.F.T. - Legs Open Wide Enter Slowly To Obtain Full Treatment, Lowestoft, United Kingdom

Terry Pratchett parodied this briefly in his Discworld novel Going Postal. His acronyms included L.A.N.C.R.E. and K.L.A.T.C.H. (Lancre and Klatch being two locations in the Discworld), although these were never officially expanded.

A Dirty Pretty Things song is named "B.U.R.M.A." after the country, Myanmar since 1989 or Burma who is named until 1989 and a postal acronym and contains the line 'Be Upstairs Ready My Angel'.
