= 45 rpm: The Singles, 1977–1979 =

Box set by The Jam
- Released: 2 April 2001
- Recorded: 1977–1979
- Genres: Punk rock, mod revival
- Label: Polydor
- Producer: The Jam

The Jam chronology
Fire and Skill: The Songs of the Jam (1999)	45 rpm: The Singles, 1977–1979 (2001)	45 rpm: The Singles, 1980–1982 (2001)

Professional ratings
Review scores
Source	Rating
AllMusic	4.5/5 stars

45 rpm: The Singles, 1977–1979 is a box set compilation by British rock band The Jam. The set contains the first nine singles released by the band between 1977 and 1979 in remastered formats with original artwork and reproduction sleeves.

== Track listing ==
=== Disc one ===
1. "In the City"
2. "Takin' My Love"
3. "In the City" (Video)

=== Disc two ===
1. "All Around the World"
2. "Carnaby Street"

=== Disc three ===
1. "The Modern World"
2. "Sweet Soul Music" (live at the 100 Club)
3. "Back in My Arms Again" (live at the 100 Club)
4. "Bricks & Mortar" (live at the 100 Club)

=== Disc four ===
1. "News of the World"
2. "Aunties and Uncles (Impulsive Youths)"
3. "Innocent Man"
4. "News of the World" (Video)

=== Disc five ===
1. "David Watts"
2. "'A' Bomb in Wardour Street"

=== Disc six ===
1. "Down in the Tube Station at Midnight"
2. "So Sad About Us"
3. "The Night"

=== Disc seven ===
1. "Strange Town"
2. "The Butterfly Collector"
3. "Strange Town" (Video)

=== Disc eight ===
1. "When You're Young"
2. "Smithers-Jones"
3. "When You're Young" (Video)

=== Disc nine ===
1. "The Eton Rifles"
2. "See Saw"
