= The Gift (The Jam album) =

1982 studio album by the Jam

Studio album by the Jam
- Released: 12 March 1982
- Recorded: October 1981 – February 1982
- Studios: AIR (London); PolyGram (London)
- Genres: New wave; mod revival; soul
- Length: 32:47
- Label: Polydor
- Producers: Peter Wilson; the Jam

The Jam chronology
Sound Affects (1980)	The Gift (1982)	Dig the New Breed (1982)

Singles from The Gift
- 1. "Town Called Malice" / "Precious" Released: 29 January 1982; 2. "Just Who Is the 5 O'Clock Hero?" Released: 21 June 1982

Professional ratings
Review scores
Source	Rating
AllMusic	2.5/5 stars
Robert Christgau	B
NME	(mixed)
Record Mirror	(favourable)
Uncut	8/10

The Gift is the sixth and final studio album by the English rock band the Jam. It was originally released on 12 March 1982 by Polydor as the follow-up to the Jam's critically and commercially successful studio album Sound Affects (1980). The songs were largely recorded during 1981 to 1982, at George Martin's AIR Studios, assisted by Peter Wilson. Generally regarded as the culmination of the smoother sound of the band's later work, it was one of their most successful studio albums, reaching No. 1 in the UK Albums Chart.

The song "Carnation" was later covered by Liam Gallagher of Oasis in collaboration with Steve Cradock of Ocean Colour Scene (OCS).

A 2-disc deluxe edition of The Gift was released in 2012 to mark the 30th anniversary of the album's release.

== Music and lyrics ==
The album moves away from the simpler musical forms of In the City and This Is the Modern World (both 1977) as well as the more melodic All Mod Cons (1978), Setting Sons (1979) and Sound Affects (1980), to demonstrate Weller's love of Northern soul. Funk bass lines and wah-wah guitar effects are often used throughout the album, along with jazz influences such as brass sections and saxophone solos (most notably on the track "Precious") and "Trans-Global Express" which is based on the Northern soul funk hit "So Is the Sun" by the American band World Column, lifting the chorus and rhythm line in their entirety from that song. Only two songs on the album exceed three and a half minutes.

The biggest hit of the album was "Town Called Malice". The song's title riffs on the novel A Town Like Alice (1950) whilst its lyrics lament disappearing aspects of stereotypical working class life in Margaret Thatcher's Britain. The message is not altogether negative though and the song stands as a potent rallying call to roll with the changes. One of the quintessential "state of the nation" songs in the band's catalogue, it was frequently performed by Weller in concert as a rousing finale to the set. "Just Who Is the 5 O'Clock Hero?", which was released as a 7" vinyl single in the Netherlands only, represents the efforts put in by 9-to-5 working men and women of Britain, who keep society running (and as such, are unsung heroes). Unlike the earlier song "Mr. Clean" from All Mod Cons, Paul Weller does not mock the character, but rather praises him/her. However, the character from "Mr. Clean" represents a completely different stratum of society – the executive and upper management type who would typically hound and otherwise make difficult the life of the character from "Just Who Is the 5 O'Clock Hero?"

The riff of the title track was apparently inspired by "Don't Burst My Bubble", a song first recorded by Small Faces in 1968.

== Break-up of the Jam ==
Weller's experimentation with several new musical styles on The Gift contributed to a distancing between him and the Jam's other band members, bassist Bruce Foxton and drummer Rick Buckler, who were uneasy with the move away from the band's former rock and mod revival style. Weller was discontented with contractual obligations and had begun feeling as if he were simply writing songs to order.

Nine months after the album's release the band broke up despite the album reaching number one in the UK Album Chart upon release, during the band's Trans-Global Unity Express Tour to promote the album.

== Cover art ==
The front cover of The Gift depicts the members of the band standing upon the roof of a building close to Oxford Street in the West End of London. The posture of each individual is intended to express "Running on the Spot", the opening track on side 2. Each member of the band had known the photographs would be separately tinted in the colours of red, amber, and green with the intention being to symbolise the three stages of traffic lights.

The original release of the album was on 12" vinyl and initial copies came with a paper bag stating "The Jam... A Gift". These copies became increasingly difficult to find, especially in good condition. Other issues included the regular vinyl issue, the Japanese vinyl issue (with a bonus lyric book), the CD issue, the re-mastered issue, and a later-issued Japanese version in a mini-LP style sleeve.

== Track listing ==
All songs by Paul Weller except where otherwise noted.

Side one

1. "Happy Together" – 2:51
2. "Ghosts" – 2:11
3. "Precious" – 4:13
4. "Just Who Is the 5 O'Clock Hero?" – 2:15
5. "Trans-Global Express" – 3:59

Side two

1. "Running on the Spot" – 3:06
2. "Circus" (Bruce Foxton) – 2:11
3. "The Planner's Dream Goes Wrong" – 2:19
4. "Carnation" – 3:28
5. "Town Called Malice" – 2:55
6. "The Gift" – 3:08

=== Deluxe CD track listing ===
CD1

1. "Happy Together" – 2:51
2. "Ghosts" – 2:11
3. "Precious" – 4:13
4. "Just Who Is the 5 O'Clock Hero?" – 2:15
5. "Trans-Global Express" – 3:59
6. "Running on the Spot" – 3:06
7. "Circus" (Bruce Foxton) – 2:11
8. "The Planner's Dream Goes Wrong" – 2:19
9. "Carnation" – 3:28
10. "Town Called Malice" – 2:55
11. "The Gift" – 3:08
12. "Precious 12" Version" – 5:56
13. "The Great Depression" – 2:55
14. "The Bitterest Pill (I Ever Had to Swallow)" – 3:35
15. "Pity Poor Alfie / Fever" (Eddie Cooley/Otis Blackwell) – 4:41

CD2

1. "Beat Surrender" – 3:28
2. "Shopping" – 3:22
3. "Move On Up" (Curtis Mayfield) – 3:53
4. "Stoned Out of My Mind" (Eugene Booker Record/Barbara Jean Acklin) – 3:16
5. "War" (Norman Whitfield/Barrett Strong) – 5:12
6. "Pity Poor Alfie" (swing version) – 4:12
7. "Skirt" (demo) – 2:46
8. "Ghosts" (instrumental) – 2:36
9. "Just Who Is the 5 O'Clock Hero?" (demo) – 2:22
10. "The Planner's Dream Goes Wrong" (demo) – 2:19
11. "Carnation" (instrumental demo) – 1:33
12. "Alfie" (demo 2) – 2:39
13. "We've Only Started" – 2:36
14. "Shopping" (AKA Paul's demo) – 3:23
15. "A Solid Bond in Your Heart" (demo) – 3:08

== Personnel ==
The Jam

- Paul Weller – lead vocals and backing vocals, electric guitar
- Bruce Foxton – bass and backing vocals
- Rick Buckler – drums

with:

- Pete Wilson – organ on "Trans-Global Express", "Town Called Malice", "Precious" and "The Gift"
- Keith Thomas – saxophones
- Steve Nichol – trumpet
- Russ Henderson – percussion and steel drums

Technical

- Brian Robson, David Woolley, Renate Blauel – engineer
- Twink, Kevin Cummins – photography

== Chart performance ==
The Gift spent 25 weeks on the UK album charts, rising to No. 1. In the U.S., the album spent 16 weeks on the Billboard 200 album charts, the longest stretch for any of the band's albums, though its peak position of No. 82 in May 1982 fell short of the No. 72 position reached by 1980's Sound Affects.

Chart (1982)	Peak position
Australian (Kent Music Report)	23
