= Precious (The Jam song) =

Single by The Jam

from the album The Gift
- A-side: "Town Called Malice"
- Released: 29 January 1982
- Recorded: 1981
- Genre: Funk; punk funk
- Length: 4:12
- Label: Polydor (UK)
- Songwriter: Paul Weller
- Producers: Peter Wilson, the Jam

The Jam singles chronology
| "Absolute Beginners" (1981) | "Precious" / "Town Called Malice" (1982) | "Just Who Is the 5 O'Clock Hero?" (1982) |

Music video
- "Precious" on YouTube

"Precious" is a song written by Paul Weller and performed by British rock band the Jam.

== Details ==
It appears on the Jam's 1982 album The Gift, and was first released as a double A-side single along with "Town Called Malice". It reached number one on the UK Singles Chart, although the song received much less airplay than "Town Called Malice". It was a departure for the band from their punk and mod roots, involving a funk-like sound that the band had not previously explored. Uncut described the track as "hypnotically itchy punk-funk". Some fans and critics have noticed the song contains a number of similarities to "Papa's Got a Brand New Pigbag", which was a relatively new release itself at the time. Weller himself admitted in 1998 he had used that song as part of the inspiration for "Precious".
