= Just Who Is the 5 O'Clock Hero? =

1982 single by The Jam

"Just Who is the 5 O'Clock Hero?"

Single by The Jam

from the album The Gift
- B-side: "War", "The Great Depression"
- Released: 21 June 1982
- Recorded: 1982
- Length: 2:15
- Label: Polydor
- Songwriter: Paul Weller
- Producer: Peter Wilson

The Jam singles chronology
"Town Called Malice" / "Precious" (1982)	"Just Who is the 5 O'Clock Hero?" (1982)	"The Bitterest Pill (I Ever Had to Swallow)" (1982)

Music video
- "Just Who Is The 5 O’Clock Hero" on Dailymotion

"Just Who is the 5 O'Clock Hero?" is a song and single released by The Jam on 3 July 1982. It features on their sixth studio album The Gift. It made number eight in the UK Singles Chart in July 1982. The single came with two B-sides – a version of "War" and an original Weller song, "The Great Depression".

== Song ==
The song addresses those in 9 to 5 jobs as a nameless factory worker returns home to his wife wanting nothing but to sit and watch television before he has to go back to the 'lunch box and the worker/management rows'. The chorus focuses on the character having lived in the same street for years and highlights the futility of his life: 'as one life finishes the other one starts'- there has to be more to life than 'scrimping and saving and crossing off lists'. According to interviews with Weller (and the booklet accompanying the Direction Reaction Creation box-set) the point was not to ridicule or criticise the character (as he had Mr. Clean on All Mod Cons) but rather to highlight them as 'real heroes of Britain'.

The single was only officially released in the Netherlands, but such was the demand in the United Kingdom that enough import copies sold to give the band a top ten hit - the highest-placed imported single in UK singles charts history.

== Live performance ==
The Jam regularly played the song live on their 'Trans-Global Unity Express' world tour between March and June 1982, where it always segued into a brief cover of Sam Cooke's 1960 single 'Chain Gang'. In late 2012, Paul Weller again began performing the song live (at a much slower pace and without the 'Chain Gang' medley).
