= Absolute Beginners (The Jam song) =

Single by the Jam
- B-side: "Tales from the Riverbank"
- Released: 16 October 1981
- Genre: Mod revival, pop soul
- Length: 2:50
- Label: Polydor
- Songwriter: Paul Weller
- Producers: Peter Wilson and The Jam

The Jam singles chronology
"Funeral Pyre" (1981)	"Absolute Beginners" (1981)	"Town Called Malice" / "Precious" (1982)

Music video
- "Absolute Beginners" on YouTube

"Absolute Beginners" was a single released by the Jam on 16 October 1981. The song did not appear on any of the band's studio albums; it reached number 4 in the UK Singles Chart. The song was named after the Colin MacInnes novel of the same name. The book was one of songwriter Paul Weller's favourites, being chosen by him when he appeared on Desert Island Discs.

"Tales from the Riverbank" appeared as the B-side. The band's record company Polydor later stated that they believed "Tales from the Riverbank" should have been released as the A-side.

The song also appeared on the soundtrack for the 1997 film Grosse Pointe Blank.

== Music video ==
The video to "Absolute Beginners" was filmed in the neighbourhood around Nomis Studios in Shepherd's Bush, London. The video includes footage of the band running around terraced streets in the vicinity of the studios, chasing a camera tied to the rear of a vehicle. The video also includes inserted text slides typical of those used during the silent film era.
