= Town Called Malice =

1982 single by The Jam

Single by the Jam

from the album The Gift
- A-side: "Precious"
- Released: 29 January 1982
- Recorded: 1981
- Genre: Post-punk; new wave; Northern soul; rock; R&B
- Length: 2:52
- Label: Polydor (UK)
- Songwriter: Paul Weller
- Producers: Peter Wilson and the Jam

The Jam singles chronology
"Absolute Beginners" (1981)	"Town Called Malice" / "Precious" (1982)	"Just Who Is the 5 O'Clock Hero?" (1982)

Music video
- "Town Called Malice" on YouTube

"Town Called Malice" is a song recorded by the English rock band the Jam from their sixth and final studio album The Gift. It debuted at number one on the UK Singles Chart in February 1982.

== Overview ==
The title is inspired by the 1950 Nevil Shute novel A Town Like Alice, although Paul Weller said in 2012 that he had not read the book at the time. "Town Called Malice" was released as a double A-side single along with "Precious". A 12" version was also available with a live version of "Town Called Malice" backed by an extended version of "Precious".

Weller has said that "Town Called Malice" was written about his hometown of Woking, inspired by his working-class upbringing there and desire to leave. The Irish Independent described the song, like the band's 1980 single "Going Underground", as a "class-war tirade set to a post-punk northern soul groove". Greg Freeman of The Guardian described it as featuring a "stomping, Motown-inspired beat" conveying a "sense of pent-up rage and frustrated ambition".

Released as the first single from the album on 29 January 1982, it entered the UK Singles Chart at number one and stayed at there for three weeks, preventing "Golden Brown" by the Stranglers from reaching the top spot. EMI, the Stranglers' label, objected to the sales of both versions of "Town Called Malice" being aggregated, arguing that Jam fans were buying both and thus preventing "Golden Brown" from reaching number one.

"Town Called Malice" was the Jam's third number-one single in the UK. According to the Official Charts Company, it was the 10th best-selling single of 1982 in the UK. It was the band's sole entry on any mainstream American chart when it hit No. 31 on the Mainstream Rock Tracks chart in 1982. The song was ranked among the top ten "Tracks of the Year" for 1982 by NME.

== In popular culture ==
"Town Called Malice" has been featured in:

- The 1985 film National Lampoon's European Vacation
- The 2000 film Billy Elliot
- The 2003 video game FIFA Football 2004
- The 2005 film The Matador
- The 2016 The Walking Dead episode "The Cell"
- The 2018 Elementary episode "The Visions of Norman P. Horowitz"
- The 2018 film Accident Man by Scott Adkins
- The 2019 film Spider-Man: Far From Home
- The 2023 Sky Max television series A Town Called Malice

== Charts ==
=== Weekly charts ===
Weekly chart performance for "Town Called Malice"
Chart (1982)	Peak position
Australia (Kent Music Report)	15
Belgium (Ultratop 50 Flanders)	4
Netherlands (Dutch Top 40)	7
Netherlands (Single Top 100)	7
Ireland (IRMA)	2
New Zealand (Recorded Music NZ)	14
UK Singles (OCC)	1
US Dance Club Songs (Billboard)	45
US Mainstream Rock (Billboard)	31

=== Year-end charts ===
Year-end chart performance for "Town Called Malice"
Chart (1982)	Position
Belgium (Ultratop Flanders)	84
Netherlands (Dutch Top 40)	89
Netherlands (Single Top 100)	68

== Certifications ==
Certifications for "Town Called Malice"
Region	Certification	Certified units/sales
United Kingdom (BPI)	3× Platinum	1,800,000^{‡}
^{‡} Sales+streaming figures based on certification alone.
