= Markee Ledge =

- Born: Mark Davies
- Origin: Glasgow, Scotland
- Genres: Trip hop, breakbeat, drum and bass, dubstep, electronica
- Years active: 1995–present
- Website: www.markeeledge.com

Markee Ledge (born Mark Davies; 1974 in Springburn, Glasgow, Scotland) is a founding member of British electronic music group Kosheen.

Markee began his musical production career on Ruffneck Ting as Substance releasing projects such as 'Homeboyz', 'Damn Right' and 'LF-Ant' and with vocalist Hazel, on his first album release "Substance Spectrum" was released on RuffNeck Ting Records in 1998. Markee was instrumental in the Bristol Drum and Bass scene in the mid 1990s, Including starting the seminal 'Ruffneck Ting' and running Breakbeat Culture Record Shop and Label. Forming a partnership with Decoder, the pair released many drum and bass classic tracks as Decoder & Substance and were supported by the top players in the drum and bass scene, including Fabio & Grooverider, Andy C, Kemistry & Storm & Doc Scott, releasing music on 31 Records and DJ SS's World of Drum and Bass Compilation and well as many EPs on their Breakbeat Culture Imprint. In 1999, wanting to break out from the confines of Drum and Bass and follow his dream of forming a group, Markee Ledge started auditioning vocalists for Kosheen. He heard Sian Evans singing on a tape given to him by a friend and invited her to his studio and then along with his music partner Decoder, formed the group Kosheen.

Kosheen signed to independent Moksha Recordings in 1999 and released three singles, which generated grass roots support. The band began recording their debut album Resist the following year, which was signed and released by BMG Records in 2001. Single "Hide U" made No. 7 in the UK Singles Chart. Upon release, Resist album charted at No. 8 in the UK Albums Chart with the release of two subsequent singles "Catch" and "Hungry".

Second album Kokopelli charted at No. 6 in the UK and first single "All In My Head" hit No. 7.

The follow-up album Damage was signed to Universal in Germany and released on Moksha in the UK, and a two further albums Independence in 2012 and a fifth and final studio album Solitude in 2013 released on Kosheen Records.

In October 2015. Markee Ledge announced Elevate, an album that featured a selection of guest singers including Alys Be, Susie Ledge, and Jodie Elms, as well as guest producers including J Kenzo, Seven, Leon Switch, dubspeeka and DJ Youngsta from Rinse FM.

Markee's music has been used on a variety of TV programs, documentaries, ads and films including: CSI, 24, Queer As Folk, Jake 2.0, NY/LON, (TV Shows), The US Food Channel (main channel theme music). Ads have included; Channel 5, Galaxy Radio, BMW Mini, Nokia, Erstenbank and DFS, and various premium projects for Mitsubishi, Chivas Regal, and Jamesons. Computer games include FIFA 2003 (EA Games), Films include closing titles on Julietta, and Experiment & The Test, Along with numerous usage as TV background music on Sky TV, the BBC network and ITV.

== Discography ==
=== Studio albums ===
Year	Album details	Peak chart positions									Certifications
Year	Album details	AUS	AUT	BEL	GER	NL	FIN	SWI	US Elec.		Certifications
2001	Resist: Released: 17 September 2001; Label: BMG / Moksha; Formats: CD, LP	8	29	18	8	45	25	36	—	15	UK: Gold
2003	Kokopelli: Released: 11 August 2003; Label: BMG / Moksha; Formats: CD, LP, digital download	7	67	6	10	16	—	—	30	40	UK: Gold
2007	Damage: Released: 10 September 2007; Label: Moksha recordings; Formats: CD, LP, digital download	95	—	18	75	48	—	—	23	35	
2012	Independence: Released: 1 October 2012; Label: Kosheen Records / Ledge Productions / Sony ATV; Formats: CD, LP, digital download	—	—	37	—	—	—	—	41	—	
2013	Solitude: Released: 25 November 2013; Label: Kosheen Records / Active Distribution Ltd; Formats: CD, LP, digital download	—	—	—	—	—	—	—	—	—	

=== Extended plays ===
Year	EP details
2008	Berlin Live EP: Released: 4 August 2008; Label: Moksha; Formats: digital download

=== Singles ===
Year	Single	Peak chart positions									Album
Year	Single	UK	AUS	AUT	BEL (FLA)	GER	FIN	NED	SWE	US Dance	Album
1999	"Yes Men"	—	—	—	—	—	—	—	—	—	non-album singles
1999	"Dangerous Waters"	—	—	—	—	—	—	—	—	—	non-album singles
2000	"Hide U" / "Empty Skies"	73	78	—	—	—	—	—	—	—	Resist
2000	"Catch" / "Demonstrate"	94	—	—	—	—	—	—	—	—	Resist
2001	"(Slip & Slide) Suicide"	50	—	—	34	—	—	80	—	—	Resist
2001	"Hide U" (Remix)	6	23	—	3	77	—	5	39	15	Resist
2001	"Catch" (re-release)	15	27	—	5	19	13	20	52	22	Resist
2002	"Hungry"	13	53	—	68	79	10	—	—	—	Resist
2002	"Harder"	53	—	—	—	—	—	—	—	—	Resist
2003	"All in My Head"	7	37	—	54	—	—	—	—	18	Kokopelli
2003	"Wasting My Time"	49	—	—	—	—	—	—	—	—	Kokopelli
2004	"Avalanche" (download only)	—	—	—	—	—	—	—	—	—	Kokopelli
2007	"Overkill (Is It Over Now?)"	—	—	60	—	70	—	—	—	—	Damage
2007	"Guilty" (European download only)	—	—	—	—	—	—	—	—	—	Damage
2012	"Get a New One"	—	—	—	—	—	—	—	—	—	Independence
2012	"Holding On"	—	—	—	—	—	—	—	—	—	Independence
2012	"Mannequin"	—	—	—	—	—	—	—	—	—	Independence
2012	"Addict"	—	—	59	—	—	—	—	—	—	Independence
2013	"Harder They Fall"	—	—	—	—	—	—	—	—	—	Solitude

=== Solo albums ===
Year	Album details	Peak chart positions									Certifications
Year	Album details	UK	AUS	AUT	BEL	GER	NL	FIN	SWI	US Elec.	Certifications
2015	Elevate: Released: 4 December 2015; Label: Zonal Recordings; Formats: digital download, USB	—	—	—	—	—	—	—	—	—	
2024	Laws of Emotion: Released: 4 July 2024; Formats: digital download	—	—	—	—	—	—	—	—	—	
2026	MIND•BODY•SOUL: Released: 27 February 2026; Formats: digital download	—	—	—	—	—	—	—	—	—	
