= Straight No Chaser (magazine) =

British music magazine

- Editor: Paul Bradshaw, Neil Spencer, Kathryn Willgress
- Designer: Ian Swift
- Staff writers: Paul Bradshaw, Kathryn Willgress, Amar Patel, Sue Steward, Jez Nelson, Max Reinhardt, Annie Peel, Damien Rafferty, Joanna Funk-Reid, Vivien Goldman, Pauline Melville, Gilles Peterson, Teju Adeleye, Jody Gillett, Menelik Mimano, Tina Edwards, James Lavelle, Livingstone Marquis, Ross Allen, James McCarthy
- Photographer: Peter Williams, Ian Wright, Andy Martin, Suki Dhanda, Frederik Voisin, Liz Johnson-Arthur, Alice Arnold, Pav Modelski, Steven Cropper, Antonio Mattesini, Goswin Schwendinger
- Categories: Cultural magazine
- Frequency: 1988–1991: quarterly 1992–2007: pentannual 2017–present: annually
- Circulation: Volumes 1 & 2: 10–20,000; Later volume: unknown (limited edition)
- Publisher: Paul Bradshaw
- Founder: Paul Bradshaw, Neil Spencer, Kathryn Willgress
- Founded: June 1988
- First issue: Volume 1: 1988; Volume 2: 1998; Later volume: 2017
- Final issue: Volume 1: 1998; Volume 2: 2007; Later volume: 2018
- Country: United Kingdom
- Based in: London
- Website: http://chimurengalibrary.co.za/straight-no-chaser

Straight No Chaser is a British music magazine based in London. Originally published between 1988 and 2007, it restarted publishing in mid-2017 in a limited edition format, released once a year. The magazine covers various forms of black music and electronic music.

The magazine was founded by journalists Paul Bradshaw, Neil Spencer, and Kathryn Willgress to cover music of black origin including hip hop, dance, reggae, Latin and African styles that were largely ignored by mainstream media. It emerged in June 1988 coinciding with the Second Summer of Love.

== Publishing ==
It was published in the UK and distributed for sale across Britain, much of Europe, metropolitan areas of the US and Japan. Claiming to be the first magazine to be designed and laid out exclusively on Apple Mac computers, the first few issues were designed by Ian "Swifty" Swift at Neville Brody's studio where he worked as assistant designer of influential culture magazine, The Face. Starting out as a quarterly, the team then moved to 43B Coronet Street, Shoreditch, London, N1 6HD. It moved to pent annually (5 times) a year from 1992, however the actual number of issues released would fluctuate year on year and it didn't have a regular release date, so regular purchasers of the magazine often had to keep an eye out for its release when it happened. It also had a slightly differing version that was published and distributed for sale separately in Japan. Occasionally a covermount CD or tape was also included with the magazine, sometimes either only for a limited number of copies or for its initial print run for that issue, but other times only for sale on the Japanese edition.

== Tenth year anniversary ==
In July 1998, to celebrate the magazine's tenth birthday, Paul Bradshaw gathered all of the current contributors for a photograph with photographer Peter Williams. In tribute to Art Kane's famous 1958 group portrait of New York jazz players, A Great Day in Harlem, the photo was named A Great Day in Hoxton. Alongside prominent music business faces such as Gilles Peterson and James Lavelle were many talented designers, fashion professionals, writers, dancers, and fellow photographers.

== Slogans ==
- The Magazine Tuned to the Freedom Principle
- The Magazine of World Jazz Jive
- Interplanetary Sounds: Ancient To Future

== Content and themes ==
SNC magazines' main slogan was "Interplanetary Sounds: Ancient To Future", which basically meant it covered Jazz music at the centre, with other black music's from around the world—especially soulful electronic music—forming the core of its focus. While most of the magazine contained charts from eminent DJ's on the scene (including a regular chart from Bradshaw's DJ friends James Lavelle, Dave Hucker, Ross Allen, and Gilles Peterson) or articles on underground music scenes around the world, it also had an eye on contemporary artwork, and underground fashionable trends in and outside various music communities usually not generally well-known about outside of the world's big urban centres (London, Paris, Tokyo, New York, San Francisco, et al.). Alongside cutting-edge graphics, the magazine championed the works of emerging writers, photographers, and illustrators as well as providing an alternative context for world-renowned writers including Commonwealth Writers' Prize winner Pauline Melville, and Booker Prize winner Michael Ondaatje.

The magazine was often compared with the US magazine publication Wax Poetics, which came along later, and arguably copied Straight No Chaser's style in some design and content ways.

== Editions ==
The original magazine had 92 issues, released across two volumes of 46 issues in each: the first volume from 1988 to 1998, the second from 1998 to the last edition in 2007. In 2017, a new volume of the magazine was released, with three issues being released so far.

=== Volume 1: 1988 to 1998 ===
Photo cover artists featured on the first volume issues:

- 1 (1988, Summer): Lennie Tristano
- 2 (1988, Autumn): The Jazz Renegades (ft. Julian Joseph)
- 3 (1989, Spring): no one (ft. Reggae Philharmonic Orchestra)
- 4 (1989, Summer): Youssou N'Dour
- 5 (1989, Autumn): Cassandra Wilson
- 6 (1989, Winter): Branford Marsalis
- 7 (1990, Spring): Courtney Pine
- 8 (1990, Summer): Anita Baker
- 9 (1990, Autumn): Brenda Fassie
- 10 (1990, Winter): Baaba Maal
- 11 (1991, Spring): Cleveland Watkiss
- 12 (1991, Summer): Greg Osby
- 13 (1991, Autumn): Carleen Anderson (Young Disciples)
- 14 (1991, Winter): A Tribe Called Quest
- 15 (1992, Spring): Brand New Heavies
- 16 (1992, Spring-Summer): Omar
- 17 (1992, Summer): Galliano
- 18 (1992, Autumn): MC Solaar
- 19 (1992, Winter): John Coltrane
- 20 (1993, Spring): Tom Waits
- 21 (1993, Spring-Summer): various (Fifth Anniversary Issue)
- 22 (1993, Summer): Jazzmatazz (Guru, Donald Byrd)
- 23 (1993, Autumn): Apache Indian
- 24 (1993, Winter): Cassandra Wilson
- 25 (1994, Spring): Meshell Ndegeocello
- 26 (1994, Spring-Summer): Carleen Anderson
- 27 (1994, Summer): Dr John, Omar
- 28 (1994, Autumn): MC Solaar
- 29 (1994, Winter): Herbie Hancock
- 30 (1995, Spring): Flora Purim
- 31 (1995, Spring-Summer): no one (features a Sidewinder vol.3: South Africa '95 – Collisions & Collusions pull-out)
- 32 (1995, Summer): Steve Williamson (Outside, Cleveland Watkiss, 4hero)
- 33 (1995, Autumn): Kemistry & Storm (included covermount CD, a B&W Music sampler titled South Africa '95 with no track listing on the CD or magazine, a promo for the vinyl only 3xLP album by Outernational Meltdown – South Africa Outernational Meltdown)
- 34 (1995, Winter): Leftfield
- 35 (1996, Spring): Courtney Pine, Cassandra Wilson
- 36 (1996, Spring-Summer): Valerie Etienne
- 37 (1996, Summer): Carlinhos Brown
- 38 (1996, Autumn): Palm Skin Productions
- 39 (1996, Winter): A Guy Called Gerald
- 40 (1997, Spring): Jhelisa
- 41 (1997, Spring-Summer): Roni Size
- 42 (1997, Spring): United Future Organization
- 43 (1997, Autumn): Beth Orton
- 44 (1997, Winter): 4hero
- 45 (1998, Spring): David Byrne
- 46 (1998, Spring-Summer): Sizzla

=== Volume 2: 1998 to 2007 ===
Photo cover artists featured on the second volume issues:

- 1 (1998, Summer): Talvin Singh (included covermount CD, a Palm Pictures label sampler)
- 2 (1998, Autumn): Busi Mhlongo
- 3 (1998, Winter): Alison David
- 4 (1999, Spring): Femi Kuti
- 5 (1999, Summer): Underground Resistance
- 6 (1999, Summer): Nitin Sawhney
- 7 (1999, Autumn): Rahsaan Roland Kirk
- 8 (1999, Winter): Nikki Yeoh
- 9 (2000, Spring): Joseph Jarman (Art Ensemble of Chicago)
- 10 (2000, Spring-Summer): Fabio
- 11 (2000, Summer): Doze Green
- 12 (2000, Autumn): Wookie
- 13 (2000, Winter): Roni Size+Reprazent
- 14 (2001, Spring): Skitz
- 15 (2001, Spring-Summer): Spacek
- 16 (2001, Summer): Osunlade
- 17 (2001, Autumn): Ursula Rucker
- 18 (2001, Winter): 4hero
- 19 (2002, Spring): Seu Jorge
- 20 (2002, Spring-Summer): Cinematic Orchestra
- 21 (2002, Summer): DJ Jazzy Jeff
- 22 (2002, Autumn): Madlib
- 23 (2002, Winter): Donnie (née Donnie Johnson)
- 24 (2003, Spring): Jeff Mills
- 25 (2003, Summer): Amp Fiddler
- 26 (2003, Summer): Roy Hargrove
- 27 (2003, Autumn): Two Banks of Four
- 28 (2003, Winter): no one (two illustrated dancers, in relation to Puerto Rico's Candela Art and Music Festival article)
- 29 (2004, Spring): Dani Siciliano
- 30 (2004, Spring-Summer): Afoxé Filhos De Gandhi (Brasil 04 issue)
- 31 (2004, Summer): Theo Parrish
- 32 (2004, Autumn): Björk
- 33 (2004, Winter): Sa-Ra Creative Partners
- 34 (2005, Spring): Róisín Murphy
- 35 (2005, Spring-Summer): Saul Williams
- 36 (2005, Summer): Dwight Trible & Life Force
- 37 (2005, Autumn): Meshell Ndegeocello
- 38 (2005, Winter): Soil & "Pimp" Sessions
- 39 (2006, Spring): Jhelisa
- 40 (2006, Spring-Summer): Marc Mac
- 41 (2006, Summer): Gilles Peterson, Milton Nascimento
- 42 (2006, Autumn): Rza
- 43 (2006, Winter): Georgia Anne Muldrow
- 44 (2007, Spring): Cinematic Orchestra
- 45 (2007, Spring-Summer): Tawiah
- 46 (2007, Summer): no one (titled: The Final Issue: Tuned To The Freedom Principle – Life, Love & Unity)

=== Later volume: 2017 to present ===
Photo cover artists featured on the later volume issues:

- 1 (2017, Summer, "Issue 98"): Georgia Anne Muldrow
- 2 (2018, Summer, "Issue 99"): Cassie Kinoshi
- 3 (2019, Summer, "Issue 100"): Thelonious Monk

== Original ending ==
For various reasons, not least declining magazine sales with the spread of internet usage and thus a loss in its advertising revenues, plus the changing affects in the general music culture from vinyl and CD collecting to more digital downloading and streaming, Bradshaw decided to shut the original magazine down in 2007, with the last issue being number 46 from volume 2, the Summer edition released around August that year.

No digital versions (pdf, ePub, or similar, format) of the magazine were ever released, and there have so far been no plans to reissue them as such.

== Limited relaunch ==
In January 2017, a relaunch was announced with sales of the first issue (strangely sold as "issue 98") going live online on 1 September 2017, with a second issue (sold as "issue 99") released in September 2018., and third issue ("issue 100") released in September 2019

== See also ==
- Wax Poetics
- Shook
