= Catch (Kosheen song) =

2000 single by Kosheen

- 2001 re-release artwork

Single by Kosheen

from the album Resist
- A-side: "Demonstrate" (2000)
- B-side: "Repeat to Fade"; "Hold Me Down"
- Released: 6 November 2000
- Studio: Ledge One (Bristol, England)
- Length: 3:21
- Label: Moksha, Jive (2000); Arista, BMG (2001)
- Songwriters: Sian Evans; Mark Morrison; Darren Beale
- Producers: Decoder & Substance

Kosheen singles chronology
"Hide U" / "Empty Skies" (2000)	"Catch" / "Demonstrate" (2000)	"(Slip & Slide) Suicide" (2001)
"Hide U" (2001)	"Catch" (2001)	"Hungry" (2002)

Music video
- "Catch" on YouTube

"Catch" is a song by British electronic music group Kosheen. Written by the group members—Sian Evans, Mark Morrison, and Darren Beale—"Catch" was included on Kosheen's 2001 debut album, Resist, as the third track. The song was originally released in November 2000 as a double A-side with "Demonstrate" but did not experience success in the United Kingdom until a re-release in 2001, when "Catch" by itself reached number 15 on the UK Singles Chart. The song additionally became a top-40 hit in four European countries and Australia.

== Release and reception ==
In the United Kingdom, Moksha Recordings released "Catch" as a double A-side with "Demonstrate", which would become the opening track of Resist. Issued on 6 November 2000 across four formats, the single stalled at number 86 on the UK Singles Chart. Much like "Hide U", "Catch" was a success in Belgium and the Netherlands upon its initial release, reaching number five on Flanders' Ultratop chart and number 16 on the Dutch Top 40.

In 2001, "Hide U" was re-released in the United Kingdom via Arista Records and reached a new peak of number six, which prompted a solo re-release of "Catch" on 10 December 2001. This time, the song reached number 15 on the UK Singles Chart, staying in the top 100 for eight weeks. In 2002, the song experienced chart success in Europe and Australia, entering the top 40 in Australia, Finland, and Germany. In Ireland, the single peaked at number 44, while in Sweden, it reached number 52.

== Track listings ==
=== 2000 ===
UK CD single

1. "Catch" (Kosheen radio mix) – 3:21
2. "Catch" (Way Out West mix) – 3:25
3. "Catch" (Young Offendaz mix) – 3:17
4. "Catch" (Rennie Pilgrem mix) – 2:45
5. "Catch" (Grayed Out mix) – 3:25
6. "Catch" (Decoder & Substance mix) – 3:20

UK 12-inch single 1

A. "Catch" (Decoder & Substance mix) – 6:26
AA. "Demonstrate" (Decoder & Substance mix) – 6:55

UK 12-inch single 2

A. "Catch" (Way Out West mix) – 4:54
AA. "Catch" (Grayed Out mix) – 7:34

UK 12-inch single 3

A1. "Catch" (Young Offendaz street mix) – 7:02
AA1. "Catch" (Rennie Pilgrem instrumental) – 5:33
AA2. "Catch" (Rennie Pilgrem vocal remix) – 5:30

Benelux CD1

1. "Catch" (Kosheen radio edit)
2. "Catch" (Grayed Out vocal edit)

Benelux CD2

1. "Catch" (Kosheen radio edit)
2. "Catch" (original version)
3. "Catch" (Decoder & Substance mix)
4. "Catch" (Young Offendaz vocal mix edit)
5. "Catch" (Grayed Out vocal mix)
6. "Catch" (Way Out West vocal mix)

=== 2001 ===
UK CD1 and Australasian CD single

1. "Catch" (Kosheen radio edit) – 3:32
2. "Catch" (Gordon Kaye remix) – 5:45
3. "Catch" (Decoder vocal remix) – 4:25
4. "Catch" (Hiver & Hammer 'Flight Over Hamburg' mix) – 6:09

UK CD2

1. "Catch" (Kosheen radio edit) – 3:32
2. "Repeat to Fade" – 4:52
3. "Hold Me Down" – 4:17

UK 12-inch single

A1. "Catch" (Gordon Kaye vocal remix) – 5:45
A2. "Catch" (Hiver & Hammer 'Flight Over Hamburg' mix) – 6:09
B1. "Catch" (Ferry Corsten vocal remix) – 7:21

European CD single

1. "Catch" (Kosheen radio edit) – 3:32
2. "Catch" (Gordon Kaye vocal remix) – 5:45
3. "Catch" (Decoder vocal remix) – 4:25
4. "Catch" (Ferry Corsten vocal remix) – 7:21

== Credits and personnel ==
Credits are lifted from the UK CD singles liner notes.

Studios

- Recorded at Ledge Studios One (Bristol, England)
- Mastered at Ledge Mastering (Bristol, England)

Personnel

- Sian Evans – writing
- Mark Morrison – writing
- Darren Beale – writing
- Decoder & Substance – production, mixing
- RD2Media.com – design and art direction (2000 artwork)
- Tim Berry – photography (2000 artwork)
- Blue Source – design (2001 artwork)
- Patrice Hanicotte – photography (2001 artwork)

== Charts ==
=== Original release ===
Chart (2000–2001)	Peak position
Belgium (Ultratop 50 Flanders)	5
Netherlands (Dutch Top 40)	16
Netherlands (Single Top 100)	20
UK Singles (OCC) with "Demonstrate"	86
UK Indie (OCC) with "Demonstrate"	21

=== 2001 re-release ===
Chart (2001–2002)	Peak position
Australia (ARIA)	27
Australian Dance (ARIA)	4
Europe (Eurochart Hot 100)	86
Finland (Suomen virallinen lista)	13
Germany (GfK)	19
Ireland (IRMA)	44
Scotland Singles (OCC)	18
Sweden (Sverigetopplistan)	52
UK Singles (OCC)	15
UK Dance (OCC)	3

=== Year-end charts ===
Chart (2001)	Position
Belgium (Ultratop 50 Flanders)	74

Chart (2002)	Position
Germany (Media Control)	97

== Release history ==
Region	Date	Format(s)	Label(s)	Ref.
United Kingdom	6 November 2000	12-inch vinyl; CD	Moksha	
Benelux	November 2000	CD	Jive	
United Kingdom (re-release)	10 December 2001	12-inch vinyl; CD	Arista; BMG	
Australia	11 February 2002	CD	Arista; BMG	
