= Hungry (Kosheen song) =

2002 single by Kosheen

Single by Kosheen

from the album Resist
- B-side: "Dangerous Waters" (Kosheen mix); "Live 4 Today"
- Released: 22 April 2002
- Studio: Ledge One (Bristol, England)
- Genre: Drum and bass
- Label: Arista; BMG; Moksha
- Songwriters: Sian Evans; Darren Beale; Mark Morrison
- Producers: Decoder & Substance

Kosheen singles chronology
"Catch" (2001)	"Hungry" (2002)	"Harder" (2002)

Music video
- "Hungry" on YouTube

"Hungry" is a song by British electronic music trio Kosheen. It was written by group members Sian Evans, Darren Beale, and Mark Morrison and produced by Decoder & Substance. A drum and bass track with folk-pop influences, "Hungry" was released as the fourth single (and sixth overall) from Kosheen's 2001 debut studio album, Resist, on 22 April 2002. Upon its release, the track reached number 13 on the UK Singles Chart, becoming Kosheen's third top-20 hit, and gave the group their highest-charting single in Finland, where it peaked at number 10.

== Release and critical reception ==
In the United Kingdom, Arista Records and Moksha Recordings had originally scheduled the "Hungry" single release for 15 April 2002, but it was delayed a week to 22 April 2002. Three formats of the single were issued in the UK: two CDs and a 12-inch vinyl disc. The first CD and 12-inch vinyl contain remixes from producers such as Tiësto, Satoshi Tomiie, Bent, and Zed Bias, while the second CD includes B-sides "Dangerous Waters" and "Live 4 Today". Reviewing the song on 8 April 2002, British trade paper Music Week listed it as a "recommended" single, comparing the track to the folk-pop sound of singer-songwriter Dido combined with an "unfussy, accessible drum & bass musical template" and calling it an "absolute treat". In Australia, the song was released on 3 June 2002 as a CD single containing selected remixes.

== Chart performance ==
On the week beginning 28 April 2002, "Hungry" debuted at its peak of number 13 on the UK Singles Chart, becoming Kosheen's third top-20 hit and the last single from Resist to reach the top 40; it spent four weeks on the listing. On the UK Dance Chart, the track peaked at number four the same week. In Finland, "Hungry" became Kosheen's second and final single to chart as well as their highest-peaking song, debuting at number 10 on the 22nd chart week of 2002, its only appearance in the top 20. On 8 June 2002, the song appeared on Flanders' Ultratip Bubbling Under ranking, reaching number 18. Elsewhere in Europe, "Hungry" charted for five weeks in Germany, debuting at its peak of number 79 in early September. On the Eurochart Hot 100, the single entered the ranking at number 50, it peak, on the issue date of 11 May 2002. In Australia, the song picked up support from radio and dance clubs, allowing it to reach number 53 on the ARIA Singles Chart and number seven on the ARIA Dance Singles Chart; on the former listing, it spent four weeks in the top 100, while on the latter, it accrued nine weeks in the top 25.

== Track listings ==
UK CD1

1. "Hungry" (Kosheen radio edit) – 3:25
2. "Hungry" (Tiësto remix edit) – 5:00
3. "Hungry" (Bent remix edit) – 5:00
4. "Hungry" (Satoshi Tomiie vocal remix edit) – 5:50

UK CD2

1. "Hungry" (Decoder & Substance mix) – 6:33
2. "Dangerous Waters" (Kosheen mix) – 4:55
3. "Live 4 Today" – 4:10

UK 12-inch single

A1. "Hungry" (Tiësto remix edit) – 5:00
A2. "Hungry" (Decoder & Substance mix edit) – 5:00
B1. "Hungry" (Satoshi Tomiie vocal remix edit) – 5:50
B2. "Hungry" (Zed Bias dub edit) – 5:12

German maxi-CD single

1. "Hungry" (radio edit) – 3:25
2. "Hungry" (Satoshi Tomiie vocal remix edit) – 5:50
3. "Hungry" (Tiësto remix edit) – 5:00
4. "Hungry" (Martin Eyerer remix) – 8:15
5. "Hungry" (Bent remix edit) – 5:00
6. "Hungry" (Decoder & Substance remix) – 6:33

Australian CD single

1. "Hungry" (Kosheen radio edit) – 3:25
2. "Hungry" (Tiësto remix edit) – 5:00
3. "Hungry" (Bent remix edit) – 5:00
4. "Hungry" (Satoshi Tomiie vocal remix edit) – 5:50
5. "Hungry" (Decoder & Substance mix) – 6:33

== Credits and personnel ==
Credits are lifted from the UK CD1 liner notes.

Studio

- Recorded at Ledge Studios One (Bristol, England)

Personnel

- Sian Evans – writing
- Darren Beale – writing
- Mark Morrison – writing
- Decoder & Substance – production, mixing
- Blue Source – artwork design
- Patrice Hanicotte – photography

== Charts ==
Chart (2002)	Peak position
Australia (ARIA)	53
Australian Dance (ARIA)	7
Belgium (Ultratip Bubbling Under Flanders)	18
Europe (Eurochart Hot 100)	50
Finland (Suomen virallinen lista)	10
Germany (GfK)	79
Scotland Singles (OCC)	12
UK Singles (OCC)	13
UK Dance (OCC)	4

== Release history ==
Region	Date	Format(s)	Label(s)	Ref.
United Kingdom	22 April 2002	12-inch vinyl; CD	Arista; BMG; Moksha	
Denmark	27 May 2002	CD	BMG; Moksha	
Australia	3 June 2002	CD	Arista; BMG; Moksha	
