= Hide U =

2000 single by Kosheen

- Artwork for 2001 re-release

Single by Kosheen

from the album Resist
- A-side: "Empty Skies" (2000)
- B-side: "I Was Wrong" (2000); "Playing Games", "Get It Right" (2001)
- Released: 5 May 2000
- Studio: Ledge One (Bristol, England)
- Length: 4:12
- Label: Jive, Moksha (2000); Arista (2001)
- Songwriters: Sian Evans; Mark Morrison; Darren Beale
- Producers: Decoder & Substance

Kosheen singles chronology
"Dangerous Waters" (1999)	"Hide U" / "Empty Skies" (2000)	"Catch" / "Demonstrate" (2000)
"(Slip & Slide) Suicide" (2001)	"Hide U" (2001)	"Catch" (2001)

Music video
- "Hide U" on YouTube

"Hide U" is a song by British electronic music group Kosheen, written by group members Sian Evans, Mark Morrison, and Darren Beale. The song was originally released in 2000 and reached number 73 in the band's home country as a double A-side with "Empty Skies". The track was then remixed and re-released in 2001 as the lead single from Kosheen's debut album, Resist (2001), this time reaching number six on the UK Singles Chart. Outside the UK, the single peaked at number one in Greece and Romania, became a top-five hit in Belgium and the Netherlands, and entered the top 40 in Australia, Italy, and Sweden.

== Release and reception ==
Via Jive Records, "Hide U" was first released in Benelux on 5 May 2000, becoming a top-five hit in both Belgium and the Netherlands later in the year. In Belgium, the song charted in the Flanders region, peaking at number three for two weeks in October and ending the year as the region's 33rd-best-selling hit of 2000. In the Netherlands, the track reached number four on the Dutch Top 40 and number five on the Single Top 100. On 5 June 2000, Moksha Recordings released "Hide U" as a double A-side with "Empty Skies" in the United Kingdom. The single initially peaked at number 73 on the UK Singles Chart. Follow-up singles "Catch" / "Demonstrate" and "(Slip & Slide) Suicide" failed to surpass the UK peak of "Hide U" / "Empty Skies".

On 20 August 2001, Arista Records re-released "Hide U" as a solo single in the UK, this time in a remixed form by John Creamer & Stephane K. This release was more successful commercially, debuting and peaking at number six on the UK Singles Chart. The song was subsequently released for the first time in several European countries and Australia. In Europe, the song topped the Romanian Top 100, where it was ranked number 20 on the 2001 year-end chart, and on the Greek Singles Chart, earning a gold sales certifications for shipping over 10,000 copies in Greece. Elsewhere, the single entered the top 40 in Italy and Sweden while also charting in Ireland and Germany. In Australia, "Hide U" was released across two CD formats in October 2001, peaking at number 23 on the Australian Singles Chart that December.

== Track listings ==
=== 2000 release ===
UK CD single

1. "Empty Skies" – 4:12
2. "Hide U" – 4:50
3. "I Was Wrong" – 3:33

UK 12-inch single

A1. "Hide U" – 4:48
A2. "Hide U" (acapella) – 1:06
B1. "Empty Skies" (floor mix) – 7:22

Benelux CD single

1. "Hide U" (radio edit) – 3:57
2. "Hide U" – 4:48

Benelux 12-inch single

A1. "Hide U" – 4:48
A2. "Hide U" (acapella) – 1:06
B1. "Hide U" (ES Dubs remix) – 4:07

=== 2001 release ===
UK CD1

1. "Hide U" (John Creamer & Stephane K radio edit) – 3:32
2. "Hide U" (John Creamer & Stephane K remix edit) – 5:31
3. "Hide U" (Rollo and Sister Bliss remix edit) – 6:29
4. "Hide U" (album version) – 4:12

UK CD2

1. "Hide U" (original) – 4:50
2. "Playing Games" – 4:14
3. "Get It Right" – 4:10

UK 12-inch single

A. "Hide U" (John Creamer & Stephane K remix) – 9:19
B. "Hide U" (Rollo and Sister Bliss remix) – 8:09

European CD single

1. "Hide U" (John Creamer & Stephane K radio edit) – 3:32
2. "Hide U" (original) – 4:50

Australian CD single

1. "Hide U" (John Creamer & Stephane K radio edit) – 3:33
2. "Hide U" (original 12-inch version) – 4:48
3. "Hide U" (John Creamer & Stephane K remix) – 9:19
4. "Hide U" (ES Dubs remix) – 5:27
5. "Hide U" (Decoder & Substance 170 Mix) – 7:16
6. "Hide U" (Decoder & Substance Green Mix) – 7:17

Australian maxi-CD single

1. "Hide U" (John Creamer & Stephane K radio edit) – 3:33
2. "Hide U" (album version) – 4:12
3. "Hide U" (Rollo and Sister Bliss remix) – 8:06
4. "Playing Games" – 4:14
5. "Get It Right" – 4:10

== Credits and personnel ==
Credits are lifted from the 2001 UK CD1 liner notes.

Studio

- Recorded at Ledge Studios One (Bristol, England)

Personnel

- Sian Evans – writing
- Mark Morrison – writing
- Darren Beale – writing
- Decoder & Substance – production, mixing
- Blue Source – design
- Patrice Hanicotte – photography

== Charts ==
=== Weekly charts ===
Chart (2000)	Peak position
Belgium (Ultratop 50 Flanders)	3
Netherlands (Dutch Top 40)	4
Netherlands (Single Top 100)	5
UK Singles (Official Charts) with "Empty Skies"	73
UK Indie (Official Charts) with "Empty Skies"	14

Chart (2001–2002)	Peak position
Australia (ARIA)	23
Australian Club Chart (ARIA)	5
Australian Dance (ARIA)	2
Germany (GfK)	77
Greece (IFPI)	1
Ireland (IRMA)	50
Ireland Dance (IRMA)	9
Italy (FIMI)	32
Romania (Romanian Top 100)	1
Scottish Singles Sales (Official Charts)	8
Sweden (Sverigetopplistan)	39
UK Singles (Official Charts)	6
UK Dance (Official Charts)	1

=== Year-end charts ===
Chart (2000)	Position
Belgium (Ultratop 50 Flanders)	33
Netherlands (Dutch Top 40)	15
Netherlands (Single Top 100)	27

Chart (2001)	Position
Australian Club Chart (ARIA)	16
Romania (Romanian Top 100)	20
UK Singles (OCC)	171

== Certifications ==
Region	Certification	Certified units/sales
Greece (IFPI Greece)	Gold	10,000^{^}
^{^} Shipments figures based on certification alone.

== Release history ==
Region	Date	Format(s)	Label(s)	Ref(s).
Benelux	5 May 2000	CD	Jive	
United Kingdom	5 June 2000	12-inch vinyl	Moksha	
United Kingdom (re-release)	20 August 2001	12-inch vinyl; CD; cassette	Arista	
Australia	1 October 2001	CD	Arista	
Australia	15 October 2001	Maxi-CD	Arista	
New Zealand	22 October 2001	12-inch vinyl; CD	Arista	
United States	11 February 2002	Rhythmic contemporary radio	Arista	

== See also ==
- List of Romanian Top 100 number ones of the 2000s
