= Parallel Universe (4hero album) =

Studio album by 4hero
- Released: 1994
- Genre: Jungle; drum and bass
- Length: 70:05
- Label: Reinforced

4hero chronology
In Rough Territory (1991)	Parallel Universe (1994)	Two Pages (1998)

Parallel Universe is the second studio album by English drum and bass group 4hero, released in 1994.

== Reception ==
Professional ratings
Review scores
Source	Rating
AllMusic	5/5 stars

Parallel Universe has been viewed as a landmark release in jungle and drum and bass music. Clash wrote that it "has been credited as the first drum and bass LP", while AllMusic critic John Bush described it as "the album that showed what jungle was capable of in the full-length medium".

== Track listing ==
No.	Title	Length
1.	"Universal Love"	5:35
2.	"No Imitation"	5:00
3.	"Parallel Universe"	5:09
4.	"Talk Around Town"	5:13
5.	"Follow Your Heart (Part One)"	4:52
6.	"Wrinkles in Time"	6:00
7.	"Terraforming"	4:53
8.	"People Always Criticise Us"	5:44
9.	"Follow Your Heart (Part Two)"	5:09
10.	"Shadow Run"	2:30
11.	"Sunspots"	6:30
12.	"Sounds from the Black Hole"	6:14
13.	"Power to Move the Stars"	4:22
14.	"Solar Emissions"	4:54

Reissue bonus track
No.	Title	Length
15.	"The Paranormal in 4 Forms"	8:04
