= All in My Head (Kosheen song) =

2003 single by Kosheen

Single by Kosheen

from the album Kokopelli
- B-side: "(Slip and Slide) Suicide" (remix)
- Released: 28 July 2003
- Studio: Ledge One (Bristol, England)
- Length: 4:08
- Label: Arista; BMG; Moksha
- Songwriters: Darren Beale; Mark Morrison; Sian Evans
- Producers: Decoder & Substance

Kosheen singles chronology
| "Harder" (2002) | "All in My Head" (2003) | "Wasting My Time" (2003) |

Music video
- "All in My Head" on YouTube

"All in My Head" is a song by British electronic music group Kosheen. It was released as a single on 28 July 2003 in the United Kingdom. The single peaked at number seven on the UK Singles Chart and reached the top 40 in Australia, Ireland, and Italy.

== Track listings ==
UK CD1

1. "All in My Head" (radio edit) – 4:08
2. "All in My Head" (Planet Funk remix) – 6:01
3. "All in My Head" (Decoder & Substance remix) – 8:32

UK CD2

1. "All in My Head" (radio edit) – 4:08
2. "(Slip and Slide) Suicide" (Kosheen Head mix) – 3:39
3. "Hide U" (Decoder & Substance mix) – 4:52

UK 12-inch single

A. "All in My Head" (Planet Funk mix) – 10:46
B. "All in My Head" (Decoder & Substance mix) – 8:32

European CD single

1. "All in My Head" (radio edit) – 4:08
2. "All in My Head" (Planet Funk remix) – 10:31

Australian CD single

1. "All in My Head" (radio edit) – 4:08
2. "All in My Head" (Planet Funk remix edit) – 6:01
3. "All in My Head" (Decoder & Substance mix 2) – 8:32
4. "(Slip and Slide) Suicide" (Kosheen Head mix) – 3:39

== Charts ==
=== Weekly charts ===
| Chart (2003) | Peak position |
|---|---|
| Australia (ARIA) | 37 |
| Australian Club Chart (ARIA) | 1 |
| Belgium (Ultratip Bubbling Under Flanders) | 4 |
| Hungary (Editors' Choice Top 40) | 33 |
| Ireland (IRMA) | 34 |
| Ireland Dance (IRMA) | 4 |
| Italy (FIMI) | 34 |
| Romania (Romanian Top 100) | 38 |
| Scotland Singles (OCC) | 5 |
| UK Singles (OCC) | 7 |
| UK Dance (OCC) | 3 |

=== Year-end charts ===
| Chart (2003) | Position |
|---|---|
| Australian Club Chart (ARIA) | 24 |

== Release history ==
| Region | Date | Format(s) | Label(s) | Ref. |
|---|---|---|---|---|
| United Kingdom | 28 July 2003 | 12-inch vinyl; CD | Arista; BMG; Moksha | |
| Australia | 1 September 2003 | CD | Arista; BMG; Moksha | |
