= Makeover (disambiguation) =

A makeover is a radical renovation or change in appearance.

Makeover may also refer to:

- The Makeover, a 2006 album by Jody Whately
- "The Makeover" (Beverly Hills Teens), a television episode
- "Makeover" (Glee), a television episode
- The Makeover (2013 film), an American Hallmark Hall of Fame television film starring Julia Stiles
- The Makeover, a 2009 film with Martin Dingle-Wall and Lara Cox
