= Otchere =

Otchere is a surname. Notable people with the surname include:

- Eddie Otchere, British-Ghanaian photographer, cultural chronicler and educator
- Jacqueline Otchere (born 1996), German pole vaulter
- Paul Adom Otchere, Ghanaian broadcast journalist
