= Ursula Rucker =

American spoken word poet

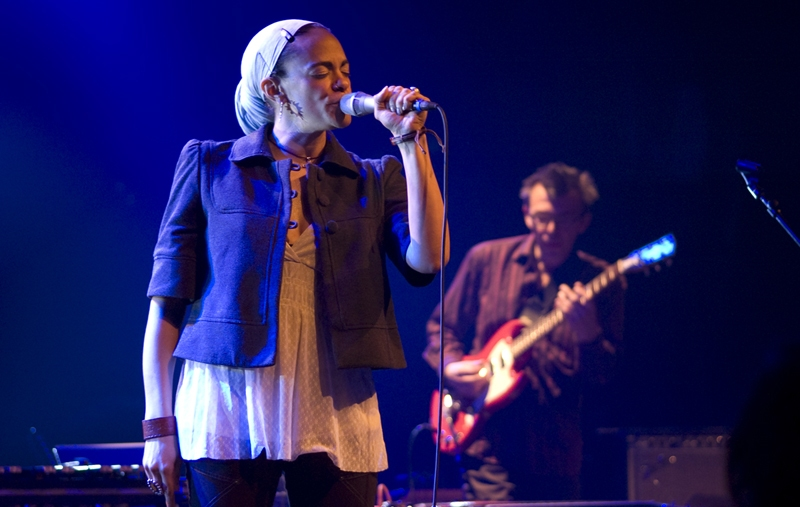
- Rucker, Donaufestival, 2008

Background information
- Born: Ursula Desire Rucker; Philadelphia, Pennsylvania, U.S.
- Origin: Philadelphia, United States
- Genres: Spoken word
- Occupations: Singer; songwriter
- Years active: 1994–present
- Labels: Studio !K7; FiveSixMedia

Ursula Desire Rucker is an American spoken word recording artist. Rucker is known for a diverse repertoire, and for using techniques that catch her listeners' attention.

== Biography ==
Rucker was born and raised in Philadelphia, Pennsylvania, where she was a graduate of Temple University’s journalism program. She is of African-American and Italian descent. Rucker had been writing poetry since adolescence but kept her writings to herself until she read poetry in 1994, at Philadelphia's Zanzibar Blue, which is credited as her debut.

That same year, Rucker was invited to collaborate with numerous recording artists, and producers including Wax Tailor, King Britt, 4hero, Incognito, Jamaaladeen Tacuma, Josh Wink, Alix Perez and most notably The Roots.

Rucker garnered a reputation for unique poetry techniques and stage presence which were described as "strong, vulnerable, wounded and raging". King Britt gave Rucker recognition and invited her to create her first spoken-word recording, the 1994 club hit "Supernatural". Dance music fans and DJ's quickly appreciated Rucker's vocals and rhythm, which was described as "mystical". According to Britt, while the original and remixes of Supernatural were continually used in clubs widespread throughout the United States, internationally, the most popular mix of the song remains the a cappella.

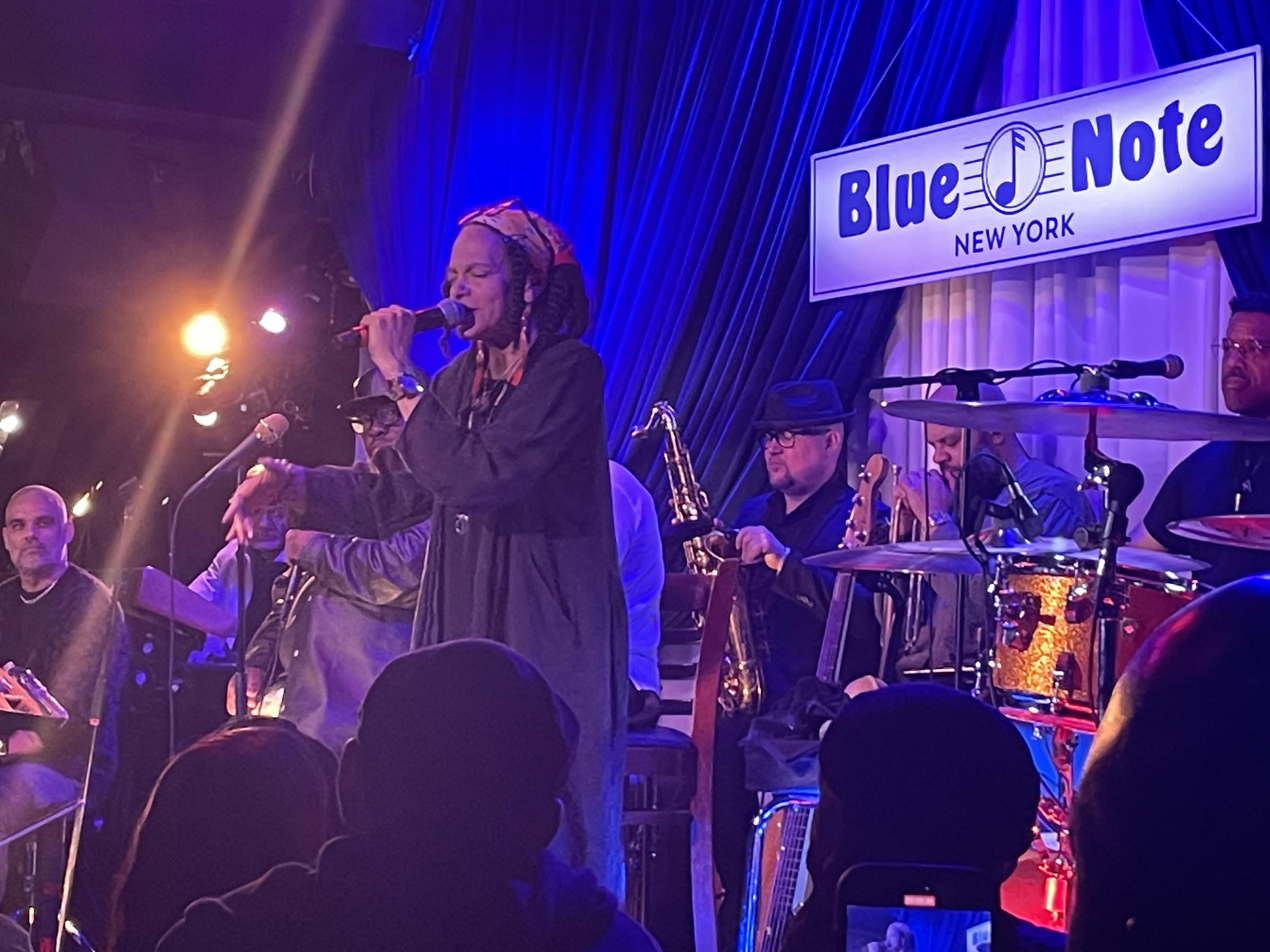
Ursula Rucker with The Roots at The Blue Note NYC in 2025

== Career ==
Rucker's emotion in her work and words, has led some critics to compare her to such celebrated writers as Sonia Sanchez and Nikki Giovanni, describing them as "powerful". Coincidentally, when Ntozake Shange was unable to supply The Roots with a spoken-word contribution for their second album Do You Want More?!!!??!, they called on Rucker to do it instead. The Unlocking led to subsequent invitations to close The Roots follow-up albums Illadelph Halflife and the certified gold record Things Fall Apart.

In numerous reviews, many critics proclaim the value of Rucker's work with The Roots, 4hero and other groups. She has had reviews in URB, VIBE, XXL, The Philadelphia Inquirer, and Straight No Chaser. Rucker has also performed her work at an array of venues, universities and festivals. Among these venues include the Montreal Jazz Festival, the 1999 Winter Music Conference, a performance at Drexel University and the 2005 Amnesty International Australia Freedom Festival which aimed to raise aware of Amnesty's global "Stop Violence against Women" campaign.

Rucker has toured with Jamaaladeen Tacuma, Sylk 130, and 4Hero in the United States and internationally in Europe. Rucker also has provided a single "Soon for Unbound", which was from a benefit album for convict Mumia Abu-Jamal. Andy Puleston wrote in his review of her album Supa Sista: "Ursula's vocals... is a silken delivery, that like Michael Franti, demonstrates that a quiet word in the ear can speak volumes above the microphone rant". Paul Sullivan said in his review of her album Silver or Lead: "Ursula's velvety voice...manages to both mollify and add a sinister dimension to the harshness of her subject matter."

== Discography ==
(Note: More extensive discography listings at Discogs.com.)

- "Supernatural" (Single) (1994)
- Supa Sista (2001)
- Silver or Lead (2003)
- Ma' at Mama (2006)
- Ruckus Soundsysdom (2008)
- She Said (2011)

=== With 4hero ===
- "Loveless" on Two Pages (1998)
- "Time" on Creating Patterns (2001)
- "The Awakening" on Play with the Changes (2007)

=== With Josh Wink ===
- "Sixth Sense" on Herehear (1998)

=== With Jazzanova ===
- "Keep Falling" on In Between (2002)

=== With Raw Artistic Soul ===
- "The Light" on You Got Rhythm Too (2007)

=== With Wax Tailor ===
- "We be" and "The Games You Play" on Hope & Sorrow (2007)

=== With The Roots ===
- "The Unlocking" on Do You Want More?!!!??! (1995)
- "The Adventures In Wonderland" on Illadelph Halflife (1996)
- "The Return to Innocence Lost" on Things Fall Apart (1999)
- "Phrentrow" and "WAOK (Ay) Rollcall" on Phrenology (2002)

=== With Incognito ===
- "Gotta" on Transatlantic R.P.M. (2000)

=== With Richard Earnshaw ===
- "Rise" on In Time (2010)

=== With Bauchklang ===
- "Toil In Your Field" on Signs (2010)

=== With Mike Lindup ===
- "World Is Ready" on Changes 2 (2023)

=== With Simon Doty ===
- "Soulflow" on Universal Language (2023)

== Film appearances ==
External videos
- “Ursula Rucker – Poet”, (Full Movie) Reelblack

She appears in the 2008 film The Black Candle, directed by M. K. Asante Jr. and narrated by Maya Angelou.

Ursula Rucker: Poet debuted at the 2008 Urbanworld Film Festival. Directed and edited by Michael J. Dennis, it was originally commissioned as part of WYBE/Mind-TV's Philadelphia Stories series.
