= Marc Mac =

British electronic dance music producer

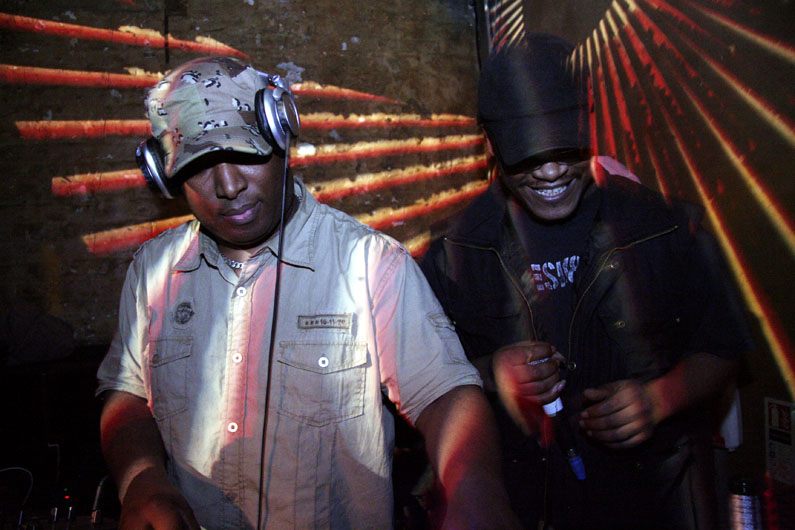
- Marc Mac with MC MG, 2007

Background information
- Also known as: Manix; Nu Era; Nature's Plan; Visioneers
- Born: London, England
- Genres: Breakbeat hardcore; jungle; drum and bass; broken beat; nu jazz; hip hop
- Occupations: DJ; Record producer
- Years active: 1989–present
- Labels: Reinforced; Talkin' Loud
- Member of: 4hero
- Website: marc4hero.bandcamp.com

Mark Anthony Clair, known as Marc Mac, is a British DJ, broadcaster, producer, promoter and label owner in the UK dance music scene who was influential in shaping dance music of the 1990s. Mac has been instrumental in a number of genres including breakbeat hardcore, jungle, drum and bass, downtempo, broken beat and nu jazz. He is one half of the group 4hero, founded in partnership with collaborator Dego (Dennis McFarlane), and a co-founder of Reinforced Records. Mac's other solo projects include The Visioneers (jazz/hip-hop), Manix (breakbeat hardcore), Nu Era (techno), and Nature's Plan (Afro-Latin).

== Early life ==
Marc Mac was born and raised in London and attended school in Harlesden. His family emigrated to England from Jamaica and are part of the Windrush generation Caribbean-British legacy. His parents were active in the community creating programming to support and advocate for local youth and their families. His family was instrumental in founding the Black Parents Movement and Black Cultural Archives in collaboration with other community members.

Among the works Mac and his siblings grew up listening to were those by Bob Marley, Johnny Clarke, Two Sevens Clash, Elvis Presley, Elton John, and the gospel records of Jim Reeves; while visiting family in the United States, he would listen to underground music from Detroit and Chicago, the early hip-hop of New York City and music by Big Daddy Kane, Roxanne Shanté, Public Enemy, Zulu Nation, and the label Cold Chillin.

Mac's early works were "faceless" in an effort to circumvent institutional racism. Following in the foosteps of his family and Harlesden community context, Mac steeped his musical practice in anti-oppression practices advocating for equal rights and the protection and continuation of Black cultural legacies. His productions pay tribute to past musical greats, Black visionaries from the Civil Rights movement, Black Panthers, Afrofuturists, and the early days of hip-hop, electro, folk and jazz.

== Sound systems ==
Mac started his career in music in sound system culture. In 1985, Mac and friends founded sound systems called Solar Zone and Midnight Lovers. His family's involvement in organising the local anti-oppression community afforded him the opportunity to practice and play in the professional context of a large concert hall in Alperton near Wembley. Solar Zone eventually gathered enough of a fan base to sell tickets and perform in blues clubs (then-illegal clubs, often found in suburban neighbourhoods). Like the Jamaican sound engineer/producer King Tubby, Mac experiments with aspects of DIY sound production. Experiments with building speakers led him to create fully fledged mobile sound system rigs for radio and carnivals.

== Pirate radio ==
In 1989, before 4hero and Reinforced Records had started, Mac and Dego founded a pirate radio station called Strong Island Radio, based in Dollis Hill where they attended college. Its name came from the station with the same name broadcast from Long Island, New York. Mac and Iain Bardouille also played on the Girls FM station in the midnight slot.

== Reinforced Records ==
In 1989, Mac and Gus Lawrence founded Reinforced Records, which featured a diverse selection of sounds including breakbeat hardcore, jungle, drum & bass, and a roster including Goldie, Doc Scott, DJ Randall, Nookie, Tek9, Grooverider, Kemistry & Storm, Wings (aka Roni Size, Krust and Die), A Guy Called Gerald, Peshay, J Majik, Photek, 4hero, Manix and Tom & Jerry. Reinforced Records has supported new musical genres and emerging artists, pioneering the sounds of 1990s British dance music scene through mentorship, networking opportunities, collaboration and music production. The Dollis Hill studio had an atmosphere and function similar in spirit to the community centres that they frequented as youth.

Through Reinforced, Mac and Dego were introduced to Goldie by his partner DJ Kemistry at the dance music club, Astoria. Goldie was first involved at Reinforced Records as A&R staff, then later started collaborating with the duo in their studio.

== 4hero ==
In 1989, Mac, Dego, Iain Bardouille, and Reinforced co-founder Gus Lawrence founded a rotating musical collective called 4hero, resulting in a number of singles and the album In Rough Territory. 4hero would later become just Mac and Dego. 4hero's sound experimentations contributed to new music genres including breakbeat hardcore, jungle, drum and bass, and broken beat. Their remix of Nuyorican Soul's "Black Gold of the Sun" heralded a shift into nu jazz and which led to the 1998 album Creating Patterns.

== Other work ==
In 2002, Mac, in partnership with Jean-Paul "Bluey" Maunick of the acid jazz band, Incognito, produced and arranged Speak Your Peace by Terry Callier.

Mac has multiple independent projects and collaborations exploring a variety of musical genres outside of the group 4hero including Brazilika, Visioneers, and All Power to the People.

== Discography ==
Albums (listed most recent to older):

- Marc Mac presents Visioneers – Def Radio - Omniverse - 2024 (6 versions)
- The Invisible Soldiers - Omniverse Recordings - 2020 (2 versions)
- Blue Tape Instrumentals - Omniverse - 2019 - (LP, Album, Ltd, Mixed)
- Red Tape Instrumentals - Omniverse - 2019 (LP, Album, Limited Edition, Mixed)
- All Power To The People - Omnniverse - 2019 (LP, Ltd)
- Generation-X - Omniverse - 2016 (LP, Album, Ltd)
- Extend The Knowledge - Omniverse - 2016 (LP, Album, Ltd, Marble Black/Grey)
- Message From Soulville - Omniverse - 2013 (2 versions)
- T.R.A.C. Prodcued by Marc Mac - The Network - BBE - 2011 (15×File, MP3, 320 kbps)
- Beats From The Network (BFTN) - Omniverse - 2009 - (15×File, MP3, 320 kbps)
- It`s Right To Be Civil - Omniverse - 2006 (3 versions)
- Marc Mac Presents Visioneers - Dirty Old Hip Hop - BBE - 2006 (5 versions)
- How About A Game of Chess? - ABB Soul - 2005 (3 versions)

Singles and EPs

- Ike's Mood I - Omniverse Recordings - (7", Single, Ltd)
- Ja-Pan-Ah - Omniverse Recordings - 2023 (12", EP)
- Br-Azil-Ah EP - Omniverse - 2022 (12", 33 ⅓ RPM, EP)
- Ja-Maye-Ka EP - Omniverse - 2021 (12", EP)
- Ah-Free-Ka EP - Co-operation Recordings - 2019 (2 versions)
- Marc Mac Presents Visioneers - Apache / Shaft in Africa (Addis) - BBe - 2011 (7", Ltd)
- Marc Mac presents Visioneers - Dirty Old Remix EP - BBE - 2007 (12", 33 ⅓ RPM, EP)
- Headspin - Twisted Funk - 2007 (12")

Compilations

- The Power Tapes (Expanded) - Omniverse - 2020 - (3 versions)
- Vintage Bruk - Omniverse - 2019 (9×File, FLAC, Album, Comp, Stereo)
- Extend The Knowledge / It`s Right To Be Civil - Omniverse - 2011 (2×CD, Comp, Ltd)

DJ Mixes

- Forgotten Treasures Mix #13 - MusicIsMySanctuary.com - 2013 (File, MP3, Mixed, 320)
- Hipology - 101 Apparel - 2012 (2 versions)
- 4hero / Marc Mac – Brazilika (An Eclectic Brazilian DJ-Mix From Marc Mac) - Far Out Recordings - 2006 (CD, Mixed)
