= Eddie Otchere =

British-Ghanaian photographer and cultural chronicler

- Occupations: Photographer, cultural chronicler and educator
- Website: otchere.shop/pages/spirit-behind-the-lens

Eddie Otchere

Eddie Otchere is a British-Ghanaian photographer, cultural chronicler and educator based in South London, England. He is known for his portraiture and documentation of underground youth culture, leading musicians, rappers, vocalists and DJs, spanning from the mid-1990s to early 2000s. His work has been collected by the National Portrait Gallery in London.

From 1994 to 1996, Otchere was the official photographer for the jungle music label, Metalheadz. Otchere captured the underground drum and bass dance scene as it unfolded at the Blue Note nightclub in Hoxton. Otchere has published several books documenting early hip hop and the rave scene, Who Say Reload: The Stories Behind the Classic Drum & Bass Records of the 90s by both Paul Terzulli and Otchere (2021), Spirit Behind the Lens: The Making of a Hip Hop Photographer (2024), as well as many smaller photographic publications with Café Royal Books. Otchere has long been associated with the British underground electronic dance music scene. His portfolio of pioneering musical artist portraits includes 4hero, Kemistry & Storm, Goldie, Lennie De Ice, DJ Randall, Fabio, Grooverider, Aaliyah, Biggie Smalls, Jeru the Damaja, the Wu-Tang Clan, Omar, Blackstar (Mos Def and Thalib Kweli), Est'elle, and Omar, among others. Otchere's photographic work is in many collections, including that of London's Victoria & Albert Museum.

== Junglist ==
in 1995, Eddie Otchere a.k.a. James. T Kirk and Andrew Green a.k.a. Two Fingas wrote the novel Junglist, a story set in early 1990s London, exploring the interracial climate, burgeoning electronic music and sound system street culture. The novel tells the tale of four young British Black young men over an eventful weekend raving. Junglist documents early 90s inner-city rave culture through a mashup of writing genres and languages including Jamaican patois, pirate radio stations, mixtapes and nightclubs. Junglist is a cult classic and was reissued in 2021 with an introduction by the author Sukhdev Sandhu.

== Who Say Reload: The Stories Behind the Classic Drum & Bass Records of the 90s ==
In 2021 author Paul Terzulli and Otchere published the book Who Say Reload: The Stories Behind the Classic Drum & Bass Records of the 90s. The photographs were provided by Otchere from his personal archive. The book documents important early rave and jungle music scene and is an archive of the oral histories shared by pioneering producers in the electronic music scene including 4hero, Goldie, DJ Hype, Roni Size, Andy C among many others.

== Spirit Behind the Lens: The Making of a Hip Hop Photographer ==
In 2024, Otchere published Spirit Behind the Lens: The Making of a Hip Hop Photographer. This book chronicles Otchere's artistic process as a photographer and the visual branding of house, garage, jungle, drum n bass and hip-hop music scenes. The book includes Otchere's insights via a personal memoir chronicling his time documenting artists like Biggie Smalls, Wu-Tang Clan, J Lo, Lil Louis, So Solid Crew, Kemet Crew, Lennie De Ice, Goldie and Black Star.
