= Damage (Kosheen album) =

Studio album by Kosheen
- Released: 23 March 2007
- Genre: Electronica
- Label: Moksha; Universal

Kosheen chronology
| Kokopelli (2003) | Damage (2007) | Independence (2012) |

Singles from Damage
- 1. "Overkill" Released: 16 March 2007

Professional ratings
Review scores
| Source | Rating |
|---|---|
| AllMusic | 3/5 stars |
| Kronen Zeitung | 7/10 |
| Laut.de | 4/5 stars |
| Plattentests.de | 3/10 |
| Rockfeedback | 3/5 stars |

Damage is Kosheen's third studio album, released on 23 March 2007. The album was originally due to be released in 2006. However, it was pushed back to 2007. The first single released was "Overkill".

== Track listing ==
=== European edition ===
Released on 23 March 2007 (All songs by Sian Evans, Darren Beale, Mark Morrison)

1. "Damage" – 6:30
2. "Overkill" – 3:38
3. "Like a Book" – 3:35
4. "Same Ground Again" – 4:40
5. "Guilty" – 3:30
6. "Chances" – 3:35
7. "Out of This World" – 4:51
8. "Wish You Were Here" – 4:57
9. "Thief" – 4:36
10. "Under Fire" – 3:58
11. "Not Enough Love" – 5:17
12. "Cruel Heart" – 4:14
13. "Marching Orders" – 5:01
14. "Your Life" – 4:03

=== UK edition ===
Released on 10 September 2007 (All songs by Sian Evans, Darren Beale, Mark Morrison)

1. "Damage" – 6:30
2. "Overkill" – 3:38
3. "Like a Book" – 3:35
4. "Same Ground Again" – 4:40
5. "Guilty" (original) – 3:33
6. "Chances" – 3:35
7. "Out of This World" – 4:51
8. "Wish You Were Here" – 4:57
9. "Thief" – 4:36
10. "Under Fire" – 3:58
11. "Not Enough Love" – 5:17
12. "Cruel Heart" – 4:14
13. "Professional Friend" – 3:20
14. "Analogue Street Dub" – 5:52
15. "Marching Orders" – 5:01
16. "Your Life" – 4:03

== Charts ==
| Chart (2007) | Peak position |
|---|---|
| Austrian Albums (Ö3 Austria) | 18 |
| Belgian Albums (Ultratop Flanders) | 75 |
| German Albums (Offizielle Top 100) | 48 |
| Swiss Albums (Schweizer Hitparade) | 23 |
| UK Albums (OCC) | 95 |
| US Top Dance Albums (Billboard) | 35 |
