= Two Pages Reinterpretations =

Compilation album by 4hero
- Released: April 20, 1999
- Genre: Electronica, jazz, drum and bass, broken beat
- Label: Talkin' Loud

4hero chronology
Two Pages Remixed (1998)	Two Pages Reinterpretations (1999)	Creating Patterns (2001)

Professional ratings
Review scores
Source	Rating
Allmusic	3/5 stars

Two Pages Reinterpretations is a remix album by 4hero, released in 1999. The album contains tracks from their previous album Two Pages, remixed by other artists, however was preceded by the Japanese-only release Two Pages Remixed featuring many of the same tracks.

== Track listing ==
1. "Planetaria" (Hefner Remix) – 6:18
2. "We Who Are Not as Others" (Jazzanova Remix) – 7:07
3. "Mathematical Probability" (Mustang Remix) – 5:43
4. "Escape That" (New Sector Movements Selekshan 2 Sector Rub Remix) – 9:38
5. "Escape That" (Off World Remix) – 6:41
6. "Dauntless" (Restless Soul South Pacific Remix) – 4:50
7. "Starchasers" (Masters at Work Main Mix) – 10:53
8. "Star Chasers" (Azymuth Remix) – 6:18
9. "The Action" (Shawn J Period Remix) – 3:49
10. "We Who Are Not as Others" (Alpha Omega Remix) – 6:39
11. "We Who Are Not as Others" (Sonar Circle Remix) – 7:22
