= Metalheadz =

British record label

- Founded: 1994
- Founder: Goldie; Kemistry & Storm
- Genre: Drum and bass; jungle
- Country of origin: United Kingdom
- Location: London
- Official website: www.metalheadz.co.uk

Metalheadz is a major drum and bass record label based in the United Kingdom. It was founded in 1994 by Kemistry & Storm and Goldie.

== History ==
=== Origins ===
Goldie's early experiences of the rave scene, especially the club Rage had a profound effect on him. DJ Kemistry introduced him to 4hero's Reinforced Records where he went on to create some design and artwork for them, leading to doing A&R for the label. In his autobiography, Goldie explains how he took a 1991 design created by Darren Bartlett and that he added headphones to the skull design "so that the skull symbolised the head, while the 'phones were music, because music will be here long after we're all dead and gone." During a webchat with British newspaper The Guardian, Goldie stated that the design was also inspired by Wolverhampton FC's logo.

Goldie credits Grooverider with the term "Metalheadz", coined with reference to Goldie becoming increasingly obsessed with the metal acetates known as dubplates used to test out the latest tunes before release. Metalheadz effectively started out as a "dubplate label" for Reinforced, with the logo first appearing on an acetate for a Rufige Cru track.

DJ Storm recalls Kemistry bringing Goldie to London nightclub Rage: "The night Goldie really 'got it', we came back to our flat and he said 'right, I want to make this music, you’ll be the DJs, we’ll have a label and a club, we’ll make some t-shirts'. That was our dream and that dream became the Metalheadz label."

=== Early years: 1990s ===
The label's first release was a split 12" single with Doc Scott's "V.I.P. Drumz" backed with Goldie's "V.I.P. Riders Ghost". The accompanying press release stated that Metalheadz aimed to "explore both the roots of Breakbeat and Jungle, and rework it into a new dimension, Drum 'n' Bass."

The Metalheadz back catalogue from this era features many major figures from drum and bass, with artists such as Photek, Dillinja, Adam F, Grooverider (as Codename John), Doc Scott, Peshay, Alex Reece, Wax Doctor, Source Direct, J Majik, Lemon D, Hidden Agenda, Ed Rush and Optical contributing productions to the imprint.

In July 1995, the label launched the weekly Metalheadz Sunday Sessions club night, which achieved legendary status at London's Blue Note club. From 1994 to 1996, the development of Metalheadz was documented by photographer, Eddie Otchere, who became the official Metalheadz photographer.

In September 1995, Metalheadz in conjunction with FFRR Records released Goldie's critically acclaimed debut album Timeless.

In 1996 Metalheadz released the first instalment in the groundbreaking Platinum Breakz series of compilations, (again in collaboration with FFRR Records). The first volume was billed as "21st Century Urban Breakbeat Music" and included tracks by 11 artists which had previously appeared on 12" as well as new efforts. The series was hailed by critics as the uniquely futuristic sound of young, multiracial Britain. They showcased a maturing genre of music that displayed the influences of reggae, hip-hop, house and techno and were highly sophisticated and intricately produced, contrary to the image of the music that had been presented by the mass media up to that point. Before their release, drum and bass compilations had been more closely associated with live DJ mix albums of varying quality, and the interest in the Platinum Breakz series proved instrumental in bringing the scene from its underground origins to the brink of mainstream success (at least in the UK).

1998 saw the release of "Talkin' Headz – The Metalheadz Documentary", a film by Manga Entertainment.

Founding member Kemistry died in a car accident in 1999.

Goldie, the club night, the label and its artists were some of the key elements in drum and bass/jungle's mid-to-late 90s mainstream resurgence.

=== 21st century ===
In August 2009, the Metalheadz Podcast was first released, with steadily rotating DJs presenting the podcast.

In February 2010, Metalheadz beat Soul II Soul, the Trojan Soundsystem, and Digital Mystikz in the first Red Bull Music Academy Culture Clash at the Camden Roundhouse.

In 2012, the label celebrated its 100th release.

Label founder Goldie stepped down as director in November 2019.

Celebrating 30 years of the label, a tour beginning in Bucharest was announced for October and November 2023. Further dates followed in 2024.

== Artists ==
- Adred
- Alex & Stewart Reece
- AntTC1
- Artificial Intelligence
- Agzilla
- Benny L
- Blocks & Escher
- Detboi
- Digital
- Dillinja
- DLR
- Doc Scott
- Fanu
- Friske
- Goldie
- Gremlinz
- Grey Code
- Grooverider
- Hidden Agenda
- HLZ
- Ink
- Jaise
- Jesta
- Jubei
- Kid Drama
- Lenzman
- Loxy
- Mako
- Mikal
- NC-17
- Om Unit
- Onemind
- Paradox
- Peshay
- Phase
- Photek
- Quartz
- Randall
- Resound
- SB81
- Scar
- Spirit
- Storm
- Total Science
- Ulterior Motive
- Zero T

== See also ==
- Reinforced Records
- Lists of record labels
- List of jungle and drum and bass artists
- Drum and bass
