= Creating Patterns =

Studio album by 4hero
- Released: 29 October 2001
- Studio: Dollis Hill Studio, London
- Genre: Nu jazz
- Length: 67:02
- Label: Talkin' Loud
- Producer: Dego, Marc Mac

4hero chronology
Two Pages Reinterpretations (1999)	Creating Patterns (2001)	The Remix Album (2004)

Professional ratings
Review scores
Source	Rating
AllMusic	4/5 stars
Pitchfork	7.0/10

Creating Patterns is a studio album by 4hero, (producers Marc Mac and Dego) released via Talkin' Loud in 2001. It peaked at number 65 on the UK Albums Chart.

== Track listing ==
No.	Title	Length
1.	"Conceptions"	5:39
2.	"Time" (featuring Ursula Rucker)	4:38
3.	"Golden Solitude"	6:55
4.	"Twothesme"	6:01
5.	"Another Day" (featuring Jill Scott)	4:57
6.	"Hold It Down" (featuring Lady Alma Horton)	5:11
7.	"Unique" (featuring Patricia Marx)	4:43
8.	"Something Nothing"	2:37
9.	"Ways of Thought"	4:29
10.	"Eight"	5:40
11.	"Blank Cells"	5:00
12.	"Twelve Tribes" (featuring Mark Murphy)	6:06
13.	"2-BS-74638"	3:59
14.	"Les Fleur"	6:05
15.	"The Day of the Greys" (featuring Terry Callier)	5:56

"Blank Cells" and "The Day of the Greys" are included only on some editions.

== Charts ==
Chart	Peak position
UK Albums (OCC)	65
