= Kosheen =

British electronic music group

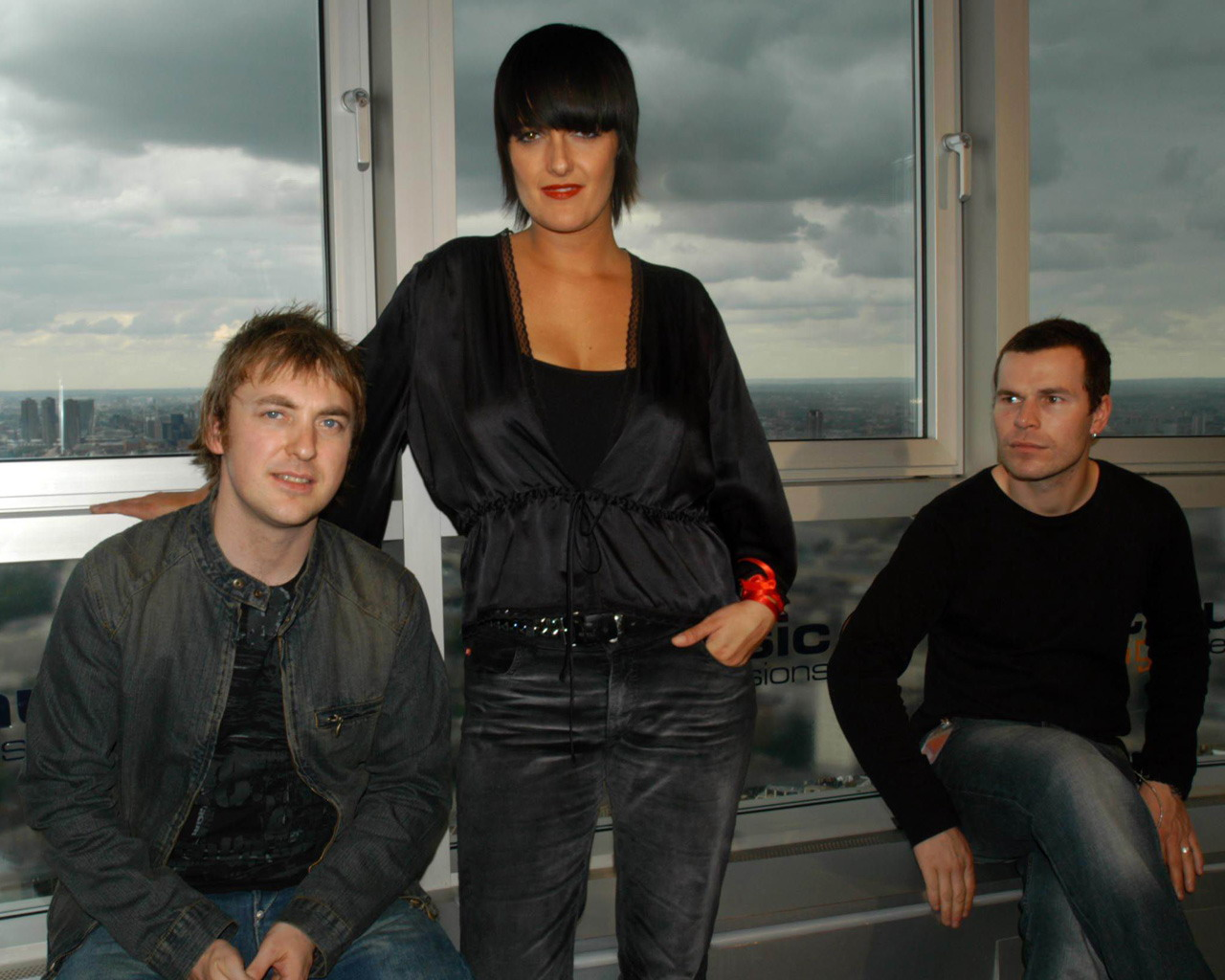
- Kosheen in 2004

Background information
- Origin: Bristol, England, United Kingdom
- Genres: Trip hop; breakbeat; alternative rock; electronic; drum and bass
- Years active: 1999–2016, 2019–present
- Labels: Breakbeat Culture (1999–2001, 2012–2016); Moksha (2000–2010); Sony BMG (2001–2004); Universal (2007–2010)
- Members: Sian Evans; Ron McElroy; Mitchell Glover
- Past members: Markee Ledge; Darren Beale
- Website: www.kosheen.live

Kosheen are a British electronic music group based in Bristol. The group originally consisted of singer-songwriter Sian Evans, songwriter-producer Markee Ledge and producer-songwriter Darren Beale. Currently it consists of Evans, songwriter-producer Ron McElroy and drummer Mitchell Glover. The bandname Kosheen is inspired by the name of the North American Apache warrior, Cochise.

== History ==
=== Resist (1999–2002) ===
Their first album, Resist, was released in September 2001 on Moksha Recordings/BMG and reached number eight in the UK album chart.

=== Kokopelli (2003–2005) ===
Their second album, Kokopelli—released in August 2003 on Moksha Recordings/Sony and named after a mythical Native American spirit—focused less on drum and bass beats and more on guitar riffs and darker-toned lyrics. It outperformed its predecessor in the UK album chart by reaching number seven, and the single "All In My Head" also reached number seven, but it did not sell as well as its predecessor.

=== Damage (2007–2008) ===
Their third album, Damage, was released in Europe via Moksha/Universal Germany in March 2007. The UK edition of Damage, featuring two new tracks—"Analogue Street Dub" and "Professional Friend" (not included on the European edition)—was released via Moksha Recordings in September 2007.

The first single from Damage was "Overkill", released in March (Europe) and August (UK) 2007.

=== Independence (2012–2013) ===
In 2010, Kosheen set up their own label, Skeleton, with its first release, "Warning", released on 27 September. On 19 December 2010, they posted the first track, "Belladonna", from Independence, on their Facebook page, along with three more tracks ("Waste", "Enter" and "You Don't Own Me") on their SoundCloud page.

On 25 October 2011, fresh from the success of Sian Evans collaboration with DJ Fresh "Louder" which had reached number 1 in the UK Singles Chart in July, Kosheen confirmed an album release in May 2012, and a single, titled "Get a New One", on 13 February. The second single, "Holding On", features Susie Ledge as the guest vocalist. An announcement was made by the band on their official website that Independence would be released at the end of September 2012. It was released on 1 October 2012. "Mannequin" was later released as the third single from the album. Other songs on the album include "Waste", "Spies", "Addict" and "Tightly".

=== Solitude (2013–2016) ===
On 8 November 2013, Kosheen debuted a video for the song "Harder They Fall" as an introduction to their fifth studio album, Solitude. Four days later, the band uploaded the artwork to Solitude along with a release date of 25 November 2013.

The band disbanded in 2016. According to Evans, the band fell apart due to creative differences: "[Ledge and Beale] wanted to go down a much darker, more underground route. I think that they took it real hard that the drum and bass world wasn’t particularly responsive to our music, and they wanted to be in the underground drum and bass scene, and I wanted to write beautiful songs". The breakup was followed by a legal dispute over the band identity.

=== Reunion (2019–present) ===
In 2019 the band, consisting of Evans and two new members, Ron McElroy and Mitchell Glover, started touring. No plans have been announced for new albums.

== Solo projects ==
In September 2015, Markee Ledge announced he was releasing a solo album, Elevate, featuring Susie Ledge on the title track.

As of 2017, the members were working on their solo projects.

== Discography ==
=== Studio albums ===
Year	Album details	Peak chart positions									Certifications
Year	Album details	UK	AUS	AUT	BEL	GER	NL	FIN	SWI	US Elec.	Certifications
2001	Resist: Released: 17 September 2001; Label: BMG / Moksha; Formats: CD, LP	8	29	18	8	45	25	36	—	15	BPI: Platinum
2003	Kokopelli: Released: 11 August 2003; Label: BMG / Moksha; Formats: CD, LP, digital download	7	67	6	10	16	—	—	30	40	BPI: Gold
2007	Damage: Released: 10 September 2007; Label: Moksha; Formats: CD, LP, digital download	95	—	18	75	48	—	—	23	35	
2012	Independence: Released: 1 October 2012; Label: Kosheen Records / Ledge Productions / Sony ATV; Formats: CD, LP, digital download	—	—	37	—	—	—	—	41	—	
2013	Solitude: Released: 25 November 2013; Label: Kosheen Records / Active Distribution; Formats: CD, LP, digital download	—	—	—	—	—	—	—	—	—	

=== Extended plays ===
Year	EP details
2008	Berlin Live EP: Released: 4 August 2008; Label: Moksha; Formats: Digital download

=== Singles ===
Year	Single	Peak chart positions									Album
Year	Single	UK	AUS	AUT	BEL (FLA)	GER	FIN	NED	SWE	US Dance	Album
1999	"Yes Men"	—	—	—	—	—	—	—	—	—	Non-album singles
1999	"Dangerous Waters"	—	—	—	—	—	—	—	—	—	Non-album singles
2000	"Hide U" / "Empty Skies"	73	78	—	3	—	—	5	—	—	Resist
2000	"Catch" / "Demonstrate"	94	—	—	5	—	—	20	—	—	Resist
2001	"(Slip & Slide) Suicide"	50	—	—	34	—	—	80	—	—	Resist
2001	"Hide U" (Remix)	6	23	—	—	77	—	—	39	15	Resist
2001	"Catch" (re-release)	15	27	—	—	19	13	—	52	22	Resist
2002	"Hungry"	13	53	—	68	79	10	—	—	—	Resist
2002	"Harder"	53	—	—	—	—	—	—	—	—	Resist
2003	"All in My Head"	7	37	—	54	—	—	—	—	18	Kokopelli
2003	"Wasting My Time"	49	—	—	—	—	—	—	—	—	Kokopelli
2004	"Avalanche" (download only)	—	—	—	—	—	—	—	—	—	Kokopelli
2007	"Overkill (Is It Over Now?)"	—	—	60	—	70	—	—	—	—	Damage
2007	"Guilty" (European download only)	—	—	—	—	—	—	—	—	—	Damage
2012	"Get a New One"	—	—	—	—	—	—	—	—	—	Independence
2012	"Holding On" (feat. Susie Ledge)	—	—	—	—	—	—	—	—	—	Non-album single
2012	"Mannequin"	—	—	—	—	—	—	—	—	—	Independence
2012	"Addict"	—	—	59	—	—	—	—	—	—	Independence
2013	"Harder They Fall"	—	—	—	—	—	—	—	—	—	Solitude

=== Music videos ===
Year	Single	Director
2001	"Hide U"	Jason Smith
2001	"Catch"	Jeff Thomas
2001	"Hide U" (US version)	
2001	"(Slip & Slide) Suicide"	Cody Burridge
2002	"Hungry"	
2002	"Harder"	Sven Harding
2003	"All in My Head"	
2003	"Wasting My Time"	Mike Lipscombe
2003	"Catch" (BCDJ's Lounge Mix)	Jeff Thomas
2007	"Overkill"	
2007	"Guilty"	
2012	"Get a New One"	Global Fire
2012	"Holding On"	
2012	"Mannequin"	Global Fire
2013	"Harder They Fall"	Global Fire
