= Play with the Changes =

Studio album by 4hero
- Released: 29 January 2007
- Genre: Electronic, trip hop, R&B, neo soul
- Length: 71:21
- Label: Raw Canvas Records
- Producer: 4hero (Dego, Marc Mac), Kaidi Tatham, Matt Lord, Akwasi Mensah

4hero chronology
The Remix Album (2004)	Play with the Changes (2007)	Extensions (2009)

Professional ratings
Review scores
Source	Rating
AllMusic	3.5/5 stars
BBC Music	favourable
musicOMH	3/5 stars
Tiny Mix Tapes	3/5 stars

Play with the Changes is an album by English electronic music duo 4hero (with band members Marc Mac and Dego), released via Raw Canvas Records in 2007. It peaked at number 91 on the UK Albums Chart.

== Track listing ==
No.	Title	Length
1.	"Morning Child"	4:36
2.	"Take My Time"	4:07
3.	"Look Inside"	4:06
4.	"Sink or Swim (No Choice for Me)"	3:50
5.	"Give In"	4:52
6.	"Play with the Changes"	5:57
7.	"Something in the Way"	4:58
8.	"Stoke Up the Fire"	5:04
9.	"The Awakening"	4:45
10.	"Sophia"	3:53
11.	"Superwoman (Where Were You When I Needed You?)"	7:53
12.	"Why Don't You Talk?"	4:35
13.	"Bed of Roses (featuring Jody Watley)"	4:06
14.	"Gonna Give It Up (Wanna Quit)"	2:45
15.	"Our Own Place" (limited edition only)	4:09
16.	"Dedication to the Horse"	1:52

== Charts ==
Chart	Peak position
UK Albums (OCC)	91
