= Reinforced Records =

British record label

- Founded: 1989
- Founder: Marc Mac / Gus Lawrence
- Genre: Breakbeat hardcore, jungle/drum and bass
- Country of origin: United Kingdom
- Location: London
- Official website: www.reinforcedrecords.co.uk

Reinforced Records is a British breakbeat hardcore, jungle, and drum and bass record label, first founded in 1989 by 4hero and based in Dollis Hill, London. Reinforced is one of the groundbreaking record labels of the genre.

== Early history ==
Reinforced was started in 1989 by Mark "Marc Mac" Clair of 4hero and Gus Lawrence, soon to be joined by Dennis "Dego" McFarlane (also of 4hero) and Ian Bardouille.

The first releases were all 4hero productions, including "Mr Kirk's Nightmare", which sold more than 24,000 copies and which truly launched the label. During the height of the rave scene in 1991 and 1992, as with labels such as Moving Shadow and Suburban Base, Reinforced Records was prolific in its output, releasing singles such as "The Head Hunter" and "Cooking Up Yah Brain" by 4hero, "Feel Real Good", "Oblivion (Head in the Clouds)" and "Rainbow People" by Manix (Marc Mac), "Kingdom of Dub" by Tek 9 (Dego), "Seance" as well as "Atheama" by Nebula II, and "A London Sumtin" by Code 071.

Probably the most important connection to be made during this time, though, was that of Goldie, who had been introduced to them by his then girlfriend DJ Kemistry. He initially created some design and artwork for the label, and went on to do A&R. He also gained some studio time, which resulted in a two track 12" single (with tracks "Krisp Biscuit" and "Killer Muffin") under the alias Rufige Kru, followed up shortly afterwards by a four track EP Darkrider. It was around this time, that Goldie also became obsessed with the use of metal acetates known as dubplates to test out new tracks before release.

The Darkrider EP was amongst a number of releases at this time to explore the darkcore sound in late 1992/early 1993, alongside "Journey From The Light" by 4hero, "Here Comes The Drumz" by Nasty Habits and "Return of Nookie" by Nookie. This period saw Reinforced continually push at the boundaries of the music and incorporating techniques such as 'time-stretching' and 'pitch-shifting', and putting out a long-running series of picture disc EPs called the Enforcers which not only allowed for more experimental music to be put out alongside dancefloor-oriented tracks, but which became increasingly innovative in their design and artwork too. In late 1993, the Internal Affairs EP was released, a collaboration between 4hero, Goldie, with vocals from Diane Charlemagne.

== 2nd wave ==
Into the second half of the 1990s, a new emerging roster of artists such as Sonar Circle, Alpha Omega, Paradox, and G-Force and Seiji (later to become part of the Bugz in the Attic production crew) were increasingly experimenting with ever chopped up drum patterns, which eventually developed into the broken beat genre. The aforementioned artists, and a new generation of producers such as Sonic & Silver, Genotype, Syntax, and Breakage came through to launch what was known as the '2nd wave' into the 2000s.

== Today ==
In recent years, Reinforced Records have largely been re-releasing back catalogue music, and putting out previously unreleased material and remixes of classic tracks.

== See also ==
- Lists of record labels
- List of electronic music record labels
- List of jungle and drum n bass record labels
