= Kokopelli (album) =

Studio album by Kosheen
- Released: 11 August 2003
- Genre: Alternative rock; electronica
- Label: Moksha

Kosheen chronology
Resist (2001)	Kokopelli (2003)	Damage (2007)

Singles from Kokopelli
- 1. "All in My Head" Released: 28 July 2003; 2. "Wasting My Time" Released: 20 October 2003; 3. "Avalanche" Released: 3 May 2004

Professional ratings
Review scores
Source	Rating
AllMusic	2.5/5 stars
Laut.de	2/5 stars
Muzik	1/5 stars
Plattentests.de	4/10
Soundi	1/5 stars

Kokopelli is the second album by British band Kosheen released in the UK through Moksha Recordings on 11 August 2003. The album saw the band lean towards the rock music genre.

Band member Darren Beale states they named the album after a Native American deity named Kokopelli. He states that "He was a spiritual character and he used to travel from the all villages and reservations to spread fertility, you know, to make their crops grow. I suppose he was like a witch doctor as well and he used to do some music and dance. We were kind of into American history and culture anyway but then Sian was reading about this guy and we thought we'd link it to that."

== Track listing ==
All songs written by Darren Beale, Sian Evans and Markee Substance.

1. "Wasting My Time" – 5:08
2. "All in My Head" (radio edit) – 4:06 *
3. "Crawling" – 3:53
4. "Avalanche" – 6:16
5. "Blue Eyed Boy" – 4:50
6. "Suzy May" – 5:31
7. "Swamp" – 3:37 (UK bonus track)
8. "Wish" – 5:10
9. "Coming Home" – 5:29
10. "Ages" – 5:48
11. "Recovery" – 5:39
12. "Little Boy" – 3:35
- Despite being listed as a radio edit, a longer version of "All in My Head" was never available (not counting remixes).

== Charts ==
Chart (2003)	Peak position
Australian Albums (ARIA)	67
Austrian Albums (Ö3 Austria)	6
Belgian Albums (Ultratop Flanders)	10
German Albums (Offizielle Top 100)	16
Polish Albums (ZPAV)	31
Swiss Albums (Schweizer Hitparade)	30
UK Albums (OCC)	7
US Top Dance Albums (Billboard)	40

== Release history ==
Region	Date	Label	Format	Catalogue
United Kingdom	11 August 2003	Moksha Recordings	CD	82876527232
Australia	18 August 2003	Moksha Recordings	CD	82876552042
