= Shook (magazine) =

British underground music magazine

- Categories: Music
- Frequency: Quarterly
- First issue: Early 2008 (issue 1)
- Final issue: Late 2011 (issue 10)
- Company: Private
- Country: United Kingdom
- Based in: London
- Language: English
- Website: shook.fm
- ISSN: 1756-5022

Shook was an underground independently produced British music magazine, based in London, which covered various forms of black music and electronic music.

The magazine covered the current black music scene in both the UK and around the rest of the world.

== Publishing ==
It was published in the UK and distributed for sale across the whole country, much of Europe, and also metropolitan areas of the US and beyond. It was published quarterly, however the actual number of issues fluctuated year on year, and it didn't have a regular release date, so regular purchasers of the magazine often had to keep an eye out for its release. Covermount CDs or tapes were not included with the magazine, although with a subscription, a free compilation or artist album was often included as a bonus with the first edition the subscriber receives.

== Content and themes ==
Shook magazine did not have a set slogan, but it covered jazz music at the center, with other black musics from around the world—especially soulful electronic music—forming the core of its focus. While some of the magazine contained charts from eminent DJs on the scene or articles on underground music scenes around the world, it also had an eye on contemporary artwork, and underground fashionable trends in and outside various music communities usually not generally well-known about outside of the world's big urban centres (London, Paris, Tokyo, New York, San Francisco, et al.).

The magazine has sometimes been compared with both the US magazine publication Wax Poetics which has been around many years and continues both publication (both physical, and later, digital), and also to the now defunct British magazine Straight No Chaser.

== Versions ==
The magazine was mainly published for sale in physical non-glossy paper form, with distribution largely appearing in record shops, larger newsagents, and bookshops like Borders, but they also initially offer the first three editions for free digital distribution as dual-page PDFs – although, this did not continue.

The magazine continued to publish in physical form, with no digital versions of the magazine ever being made available. However, while the magazine did not regularly publish digital versions, it did later offer the last two issues (issues nine and ten) for PDF viewing and free download on the Issuu online publishing platform.

== See also ==
- Wax Poetics
- Straight No Chaser
