= Wax Poetics =

American music magazine

- April/May 2007 cover
- Publisher: W.P.Media B.V
- First issue: December 2001
- Company: Wax Poetics
- Country: Global
- Language: English, Japanese
- Website: waxpoetics.com
- ISSN: 1537-8241

Wax Poetics is a global music platform for music collectors, with its roots as a music magazine dedicated to vintage and contemporary jazz, funk, soul, Latin, hip-hop, reggae, blues, and R&B in the crate-digger tradition; the name of the magazine is itself an allusion to vinyl records. Its first incarnation was in regular circulation between 2001 and 2017.

Since the first issue of Wax Poetics was published in December 2001, the magazine expanded its operations to include apparel sales, a record label, and book publishing imprint.

In November 2008, Wax Poetics, Inc. unveiled Wax Poetics Japan.

In 2021, Wax Poetics was relaunched through a Kickstarter campaign, becoming a membership platform focused on long-form music journalism.

== History ==
In spring 2001, Editor-In-Chief Andre Torres was living in New York City and conducting preliminary research for a documentary on die-hard record collectors when he realized there were no publications to consult devoted to the culture of beat-digging. He scrapped the documentary and, instead, decided to start his own quarterly to fill what he perceived to be gaps in the landscape of contemporary music magazines.

"No one was even touching jazz, soul, funk, or anything like that", Torres said in a March 2008 interview with Current TV. "What I was trying to do was essentially look at hip-hop through that lens."

Torres enlisted the help of Brian DiGenti, a close friend with editorial experience as a freelance writer. Both Torres and DiGenti had graduated from the University of Florida in 1995—Torres with a degree in painting and DiGenti with a degree in English. Although they had met at school, they didn't begin to develop a friendship until they had both moved to New York City in the late 1990s. There, they often made beats and went mining for vinyl together, further cultivating a common fascination with the crate-digging lifestyle. DiGenti had moved to California about a year before Torres called about the start-up, but agreed to co-found the publication across the country.

For a year, DiGenti and Creative Director Kevin DeBernardi, then a partner in the fledgling quarterly, collaborated to create a mock-up of Wax Poetics. In December 2001, Torres, DiGenti, and DeBernardi independently published the first issue, which cost US$6 and featured stories on Bobbito, Scotty Hard, Idris Muhammad, Charles Mingus, and Madlib. The magazine continues to be independently published.

Starting with Issue 2, Torres began to incorporate a one-page editor's letter to preface the magazine's content.

With Issue 15, published in February 2006, Wax Poetics transitioned from a quarterly to bimonthly magazine.

As of September 2011, forty-eight issues of the magazine have been published. In terms of physical size, the magazine is a 7×10-inch publication in the vein of National Geographic. It has grown from 81 pages in its first issue to 130 pages on average. Aside from regular contributions from editors, the magazine has no staff writers and relies exclusively on freelance work.

According to a 2009 press manual released by Wax Poetics, Inc. readership has also grown exponentially. Today, there are approximately three readers to each issue, making for a total audience of 232,200. About 92% of Wax Poetics readership lies within the United States, mostly in Mid-Atlantic and Pacific states. Ninety-seven percent of readers claim to collect their issues, according to a Wax Poetics reader survey conducted in June 2008.

Torres' manifesto was not only to shed light on funk, soul, and jazz, but to illuminate the symbiotic and historical relationship between those genres and contemporary hip-hop. Wax Poetics regularly features seminal artists like David Axelrod or Bob James, unveiling the stories behind the people and music that have provided both a cultural framework for hip-hop to evolve, and the sonic backbone for crucial elements like breakbeat.

"We dibble-dabble in the new and the old", Torres told Current TV. "Young people come to this older music; it's through hip-hop. It's hearing someone sample something and saying, "Oh, yo, I gotta find that record that Primo or Dr. Dre or whoever used on that track. It's like a time-machine. You use hip-hop to travel back and pick up on everything that's happened before."

Since Issue 4, every issue of the magazine features a "re:Discovery", or a brief article that revisits a noteworthy vintage record. Recent issues include upwards of five re:Discovery blurbs, each accompanied by a full-color photograph of the record itself or its original cover.

Aesthetically, the magazine has been hailed by the New York Times Style Magazine as, "The best and most exquisitely laid-out music bimonthly in America" Starting with Issue 19, Wax Poetics regularly began to feature a different artist on the front and back covers of the magazine; prior to this design change, both covers typically featured artwork or non-specific vintage photographs.

"I wanted to create something that, when you finished reading it, there would be no way that you would ever think about putting it in the trash", Torres told Current TV.

In 2007, Wax Poetics, Inc. expanded to include a book publishing division and a record label.

Wax Poetics Books has since released three coffee table anthologies, including two collections of notable past articles, published in response to demand for back issues. The manifesto of Wax Poetics Records is to reissue rare LPs, 12-inches, and 7-inches.

In summer 2008, the company also launched an online music store—Wax Poetics Digital—where customers can purchase performance-quality mp3s of music featured in the magazine.

In 2011, Wax Poetics, Inc. received an Utne Reader Independent Press Award for Arts Coverage.

In 2013, early trailers for the film Dead Man Down featured a cover of Pink Floyd's "Shine On You Crazy Diamond" performed by Wax Poetics Records artist Kendra Morris.

In 2016, Founder Andre Torres stepped down from the magazine.

On January 16, 2018, Wax Poetics sent an email to subscribers, advising them:

It is with great sadness that we announce we are no longer able to fulfill Wax Poetics Magazine subscriptions. After sixteen years in print, we will cease being a traditional newsstand publication. We want to sincerely thank all of our loyal fans, customers, and subscribers who supported us since December 2001. And we are truly sorry that we are unable to fulfill our obligations to our current subscribers who put their trust in us.

While our subscribers have always been very important, please understand that we never made a profit from selling subscriptions because of the high price of printing an independent, niche, high-quality magazine; as well as the increasing shipping prices and the cost of customer service. We always set the price at a breakeven level, but we often lost money on subs when all was said and done. Unfortunately, we are unable to refund the cost of your subscription. And we are unable to deliver the Prince issue.

We will be starting a new venture where we can offer a version of Wax Poetics as a print-on-demand journal via Amazon/Ingram. This technology will allow us to continue creating the long-form music journalism that we have always been known for in a printed form, but we will no longer have to front costs for printing and freight. Please understand this is a separate venture, and thus a separate product for these reasons. We hope our longtime customers will understand and continue to support Wax Poetics.

=== Relaunch ===
In 2020 Wax Poetics changed ownership and was taken over by two fans to help revive the magazine. After a successful Kickstarter campaign, Wax Poetics relaunched as a global collectors platform in February 2021.

== Record label ==
Artists signed to the Wax Poetics label include Kendra Morris, Adrian Younge and The Jack Moves.

== See also ==
- Straight No Chaser (magazine)
- Shook (magazine)
