= Sian Evans =

Welsh singer (born 1971)

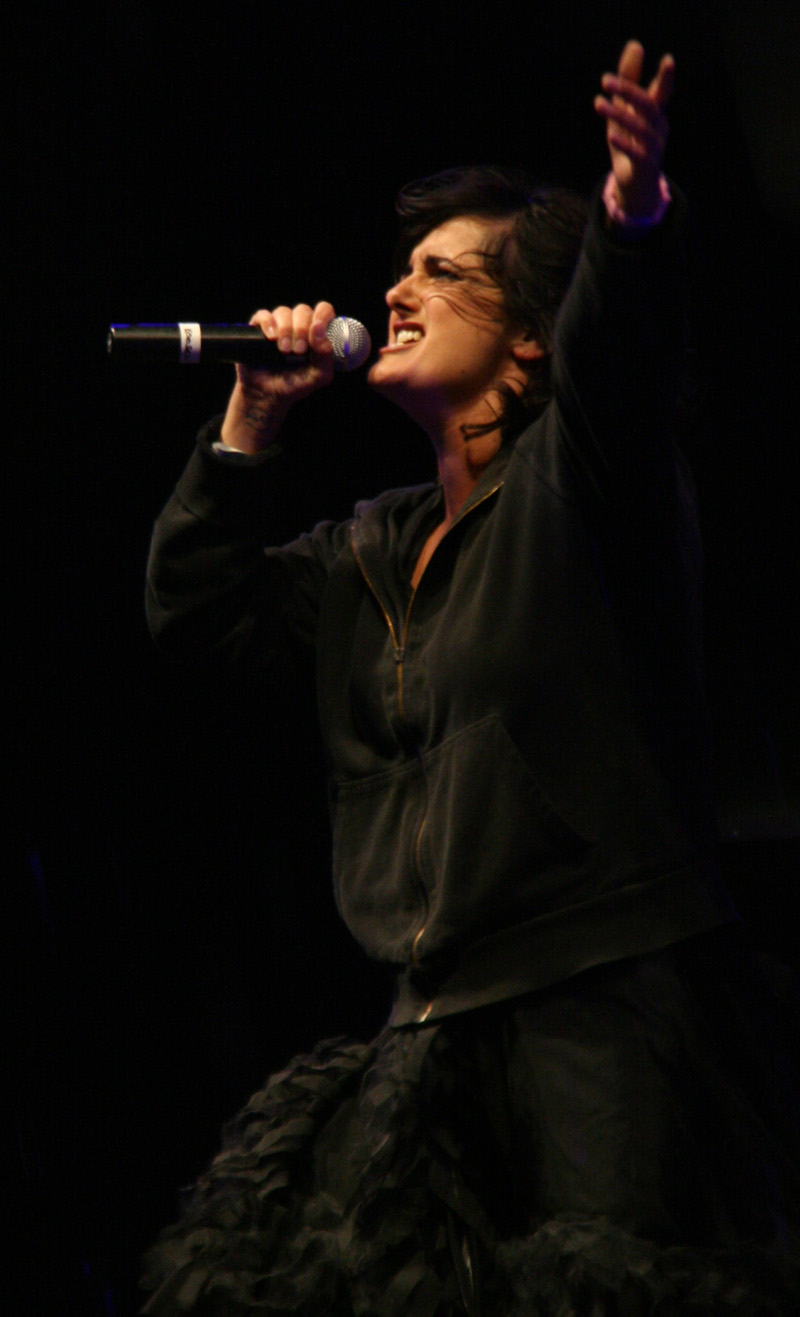
- In Vienna, 2008

Background information
- Born: Sian Evans; 9 October 1971 (age 55)
- Origin: Caerphilly, Wales, United Kingdom
- Genres: Trip hop; drum and bass; alternative rock; synth-pop; breakbeat; dubstep; electro house; hardstyle; trance
- Occupations: Singer; songwriter
- Years active: 1997–present
- Labels: Ministry of Sound; Moksha; Universal; Sony BMG
- Website: www.sian-evans.com

Sian Evans (born 9 October 1971) is a Welsh singer and songwriter from Caerphilly. She is front woman and singer-songwriter of the band Kosheen, a trip-hop/drum and bass group that had their first two albums rise into the top 10 of the UK Albums Chart between 2001 and 2003. She has also joined a list of Welsh artists to have topped the UK Singles Chart with collaboration on the track "Louder" with DJ Fresh in July 2011, becoming the first Welsh female artist to top the chart since Bonnie Tyler's "Total Eclipse of the Heart" in February 1983 and the first Welsh artist in general since Manic Street Preachers's "The Masses Against the Classes" in January 2000. Kosheen went on hiatus in 2016 and started touring again in 2019.

== Discography ==
=== Studio albums with Kosheen ===
| Year | Album details | Peak chart positions | | | | | | | | | Certifications |
| Year | Album details | UK | AUS | AUT | BEL | GER | NL | FIN | SWI | US Elec. | Certifications |
|---|---|---|---|---|---|---|---|---|---|---|---|
| 2001 | Resist: Released: 17 September 2001; Label: BMG / Moksha; Formats: CD, LP | 8 | 29 | 18 | 8 | 45 | 25 | 36 | — | 15 | UK: Gold |
| 2003 | Kokopelli: Released: 11 August 2003; Label: BMG / Moksha; Formats: CD, LP, digital download | 7 | 67 | 6 | 10 | 16 | — | — | 30 | 40 | UK: Gold |
| 2007 | Damage: Released: 10 September 2007; Label: Moksha recordings; Formats: CD, LP, digital download | 95 | — | 18 | 75 | 48 | — | — | 23 | 35 | |
| 2012 | Independence: Released: 1 October 2012; Label: Kosheen Records / Ledge Productions / Sony ATV; Formats: CD, LP, digital download | — | — | 37 | — | — | — | — | 41 | — | |
| 2013 | Solitude: Released: 25 November 2013; Label: Kosheen Records / Active Distribution Ltd; Formats: CD, LP, digital download | — | — | — | — | — | — | — | — | — | |

=== As featured artist ===
| Year | Song | Chart positions | | | | | | | Album |
| Year | Song | UK | UK Dance | UK Indie | BEL (FL) | BEL (WA) | IRE | SCO | Album |
|---|---|---|---|---|---|---|---|---|---|
| 2010 | "Your Move" (with Martin Eyerer) | – | – | – | 98 | — | — | — | Non-album single |
| 2011 | "Louder" (with DJ Fresh) | 1 | 1 | 1 | 5 | 43 | 4 | 1 | Nextlevelism |
| 2013 | "We Are One" (with Brains) | – | — | — | — | — | — | — | Full Range |
| 2014 | "Right Back" (with Dr Meaker) | 151 | 40 | 15 | – | – | – | — | Dirt & Soul |
| 2019 | "Up2U" (with The Stanton Warriors) | – | – | – | — | — | — | — | Non-album singles |
| 2019 | "Orange Heart" (with Headhunterz) | – | – | – | — | — | — | — | Non-album singles |
| 2020 | "Dragonborn Part 3 (Oceans Apart)" (with Headhunterz) | – | – | – | — | — | — | — | Non-album singles |
| 2023 | "Lost Without You (Defqon.1 2023 Closing Theme)" (with Headhunterz & Vertile) | – | – | – | — | — | — | — | Non-album singles |
"—" denotes a recording that did not chart or was not released.
