= Two Pages =

Studio album by 4hero
- Released: 13 July 1998
- Genres: Electronica; nu jazz; drum and bass; broken beat; trip hop
- Length: 106:36 (2 CD version); 77:38 (1 CD version)
- Label: Talkin' Loud
- Producer: 4hero

4hero chronology
Parallel Universe (1995)	Two Pages (1998)	Two Pages Remixed (1998)

Singles from Two Pages
- 1. "Loveless" Released: 1997; 2. "Star Chasers" Released: 1998; 3. "We Who Are Not as Others" Released: 1998; 4. "Escape That" Released: 1999

Professional ratings
Review scores
Source	Rating
AllMusic	4/5 stars
The Guardian	2/5 stars
Muzik	4/5 stars
NME	6/10
Rolling Stone	4/5 stars
Select	4/5

Two Pages is the third studio album by English electronic music group 4hero, released via Talkin' Loud on 13 July 1998. It peaked at number 38 on the UK Albums Chart. The album was shortlisted for the Mercury Music Prize in 1998.

The original UK release was a double album, spread across two compact discs; it was later released in other countries in an abridged one disc edition. A connected remix album called Two Pages Remixed was released shortly after the original album in Japan only, with an alternatively titled Two Pages Reinterpretations being released the following year in the UK.

== Track listing ==
2 CD version

"Page One" (Disc one)
No.	Title	Length
1.	"Loveless" (featuring Ursula Rucker)	5:54
2.	"Golden Age of Life"	6:00
3.	"Planetaria (A Theme from a Dream)"	6:04
4.	"Third Stream"	6:03
5.	"Escape That"	5:23
6.	"Cosmic Tree"	5:37
7.	"Spirits in Transit"	5:27
8.	"The Action" (featuring Ish AKA Butterfly)	3:17
9.	"Star Chasers"	4:53
10.	"Wishful Thinking"	5:21
11.	"Universal Reprise"	5:26
12.	"Holograms" (Japanese edition bonus track; featuring Azymuth)	5:38
13.	"Ebisu Gardens*" (Japanese edition bonus track)	6:05

"Page Two" (Disc two)
No.	Title	Length
1.	"We Who Are Not as Others"	10:15
2.	"Humans"	3:32
3.	"In the Shadows"	6:23
4.	"Mathematical Probability"	6:25
5.	"Greys"	2:09
6.	"Pegasus 51"	6:49
7.	"Worlds End"	8:06
8.	"Wormholes"	0:40
9.	"Dauntless"	2:49

4 LP vinyl version

"Chapter One" (Disc one)
No.	Title	Length
1.	"Loveless" (featuring Ursula Rucker)	5:56
2.	"Golden Age of Life"	6:01
3.	"Planeteria (A Theme from a Dream)"	6:05
4.	"Third Stream"	6:04
5.	"Spirits in Transit"	4:54

"Chapter Two" (Disc two)
No.	Title	Length
1.	"Escape That"	5:25
2.	"Cosmic Tree"	5:37
3.	"Universal Reprise"	5:26
4.	"The Action" (featuring Ish AKA Butterfly)	3:17
5.	"Wishful Thinking"	4:39
6.	"Star Chasers"	4:52

"Chapter Three" (Disc three)
No.	Title	Length
1.	"We Who Are Not as Others"	7:56
2.	"Humans"	3:27
3.	"In the Shadows"	6:23
4.	"Mathematical Probability"	6:25

"Chapter Four" (Disc four)
No.	Title	Length
1.	"Greys"	2:09
2.	"Pegasus 51"	6:49
3.	"Worlds End"	8:06
4.	"Wormholes"	0:40
5.	"Dauntless"	2:49
6.	"Mother Solar (Part One)"	0:11
7.	"Normal Changing World"	0:13
8.	"De-Sci-Fer"	0:06

1 CD version

No.	Title	Length
1.	"Loveless" (featuring Ursula Rucker)	5:54
2.	"Golden Age of Life"	6:01
3.	"Planetaria (A Theme from a Dream)"	6:02
4.	"Third Stream"	6:04
5.	"Wormholes"	0:32
6.	"Escape That"	5:25
7.	"Mother Solar (Part One)"	0:11
8.	"Spirits in Transit"	4:54
9.	"Greys"	2:00
10.	"The Action" (featuring Ish AKA Butterfly)	3:17
11.	"Star Chasers"	4:52
12.	"Wishful Thinking"	4:39
13.	"Normal Changing World"	0:13
14.	"Universal Reprise"	5:25
15.	"We Who Are Not as Others"	7:56
16.	"Humans"	3:27
17.	"Pegasus 51"	4:17
18.	"Worlds End"	6:25
19.	"De-Sci-Fer"	0:06

== Charts ==
Chart (1998)	Peak position
UK Albums (Official Charts)	38
