= DJ-Kicks: Kemistry & Storm =

Compilation album by Kemistry & Storm
- Released: 25 January 1999
- Recorded: n/a
- Genre: Drum and Bass / Jungle Music
- Label: Studio !K7 !K7074CD (CD)

DJ-Kicks chronology
DJ-Kicks: Andrea Parker (1998)	Kemistry & Storm (1999)	DJ-Kicks: Thievery Corporation (1999)

Professional ratings
Review scores
Source	Rating
Allmusic	4/5 stars

DJ-Kicks: Kemistry & Storm is a DJ mix album, mixed by Kemistry & Storm. It was released on 25 January 1999 on the Studio !K7 independent record label as part of the DJ-Kicks series.

== Track listing ==
1. "Trauma" - Dom & Roland – 3:19
2. "Ole" - John B – 4:27
3. "Submerged" - Architex & DJ Loxy – 2:42
4. "Fuse" - Dillinja – 4:03
5. "Mission Accomplished" - Digital & Spirit – 3:07
6. "Clear Skyz" - DJ Die – 3:40
7. "Closing In" - Bill Riley – 3:49
8. "Everywhere I Go (Remix)" - Sci-Clone – 4:27
9. "Stash" - Decoder – 5:19
10. "Hyaena" - Goldie – 2:45
11. "Uneasy" - Jonny L – 2:39
12. "Pressure" - John B – 5:01
13. "Venom" - Primary Motive – 3:39
14. "Space Jam" - J Majik – 4:13
15. "Static (K7 Mix)" - Lemon D – 5:39
16. "Code" - Absolute Zero & Subphonics – 4:24
17. "Tronik Funk" - Dillinja – 2:52

Tracks 4, 15 and 17 are credited to "Test" a.k.a. "Test Press" on the album.

== Personnel ==
- Absolute Zero – Performer
- Architex – Performer
- John B. – Performer
- Decoder – Performer
- DJ Die – Performer
- DJ Loxy & Usual Suspects – Performer
- Goldie – Performer
- Kemistry & Storm – DJ
- J Majik – Performer
- Primary Motive – Performer
- Bill Riley – Performer
- Marc Schilkowski – Design
- Sci-Clone – Performer
- Test – Performer
- Chris Zippel – Mastering
