= Kirk Degiorgio =

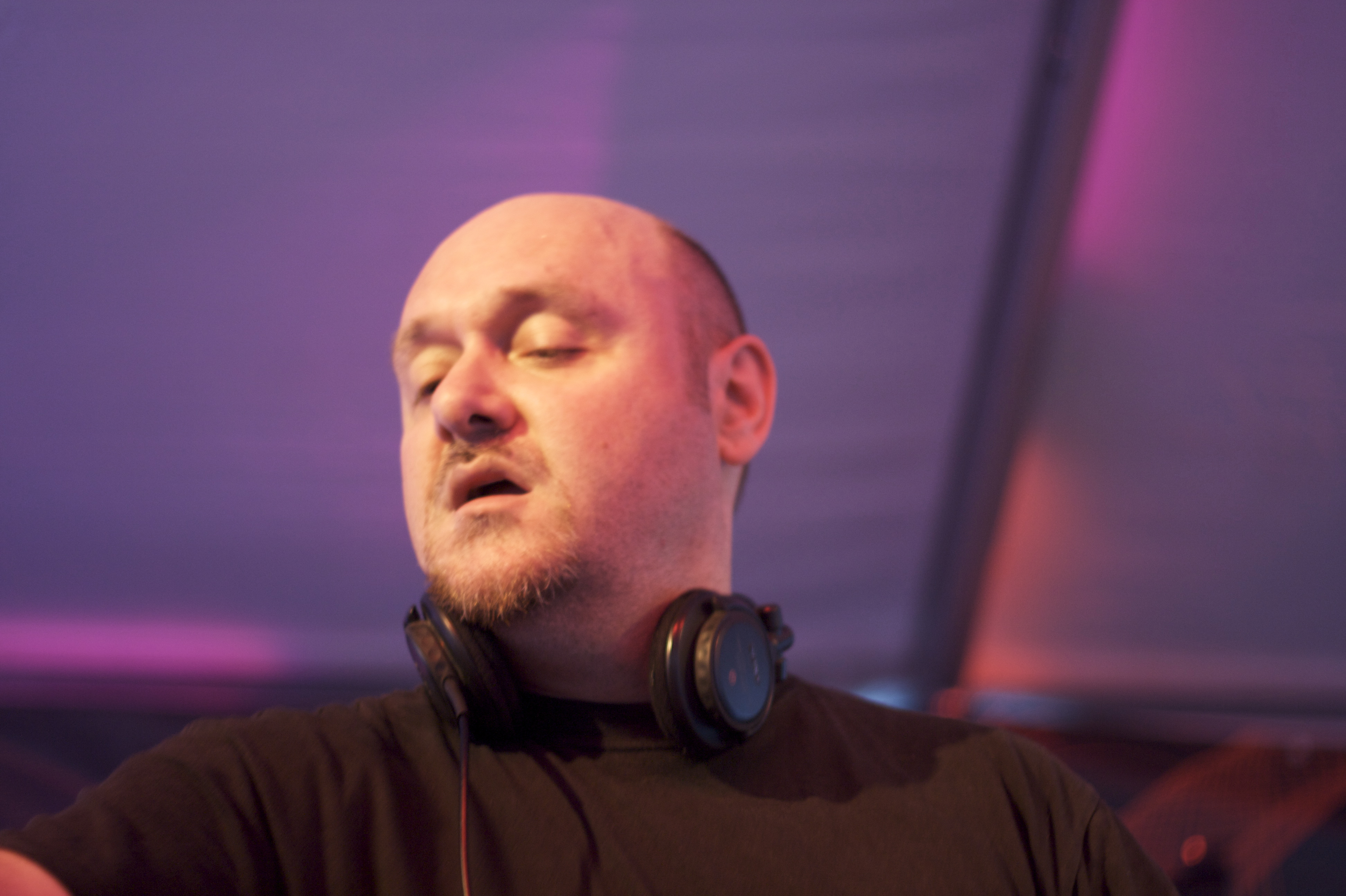
- Kirk Degiorgio (2010)

Background information
- Also known as: As One
- Born: Kirk Degiorgio
- Origin: Stepney, London
- Genres: Techno, broken beat, ambient techno
- Occupations: Producer, DJ
- Years active: 1990s–present
- Labels: A.R.T., Op-Art, B12, R&S, New Electronica
- Website: http://www.kirkdegiorgio.com/

Kirk Degiorgio, also known as As One, is a British techno producer and DJ. Born in the late 1960s in Stepney, East London, and raised in Ipswich, Suffolk, he started producing music in the early 1990s.

Between 1998 and 2001, he hosted the "R Solution" show on Kiss 100 FM alongside 4hero which was influential in the development of broken beat.

He founded the labels A.R.T. Records and Op-Art Records and releases on them as well as B12 Records, R&S Records, New Electronica, and others. His style is a mixture of Detroit-style techno, mixed with funk, soul and jazz fusion.

In 2023 he announced his retirement from DJing, citing health reasons.

== Discography ==
=== As As One ===
- Reflections (1994)
- Celestial Soul (1995)
- Reflections on Reflections (1995) (Remix album)
- The Art of Prophecy (1997)
- Planetary Folklore (1997)
- In with Their Arps, and Moogs, and Jazz and Things (1997)
- So Far: So Good (2000)
- 21st Century Soul (2001)
- Out of the Darkness (2004)
- Elegant Systems (2005)
- Planetary Folklore 2 (2006)
- Communion (2019)
- As One Squared (2023)

=== As Kirk Degiorgio ===
- Check One (1996)
- Synthesis (1998)
- Two Worlds (2001) (Far Out Recordings)
- Sambatek (2013) Far Out Recordings

=== As The Beauty Room ===
- The Beauty Room (2006)
- The Beauty Room II (2012)
