= The Makeover =

Studio album by Jody Watley
- Released: August 8, 2006; September 22, 2009 (re-issue)
- Recorded: 2005–2006
- Venue: I.B.S. Studios (Los Angeles)
- Genres: R&B; deep house; pop; electronic; soul
- Length: 58:20
- Label: Avitone
- Producers: King Britt; Rodney Lee; 4hero; Chris Brann; DJ Spinna

Jody Watley chronology
Midnight Lounge (2001)	''The Makeover'' (2006)	Super Hits Live (2007)

Alternate cover
- International edition

Singles from The Makeover
- 1. "Borderline" Released: August 8, 2006; 2. "I Want Your Love" Released: March 27, 2007; 3. "A Beautiful Life" Released: October 7, 2008

The Makeover is the ninth studio album by American singer Jody Watley, released on Avitone Records. Watley recruited a diverse group of contemporary dance and electronica producers for the project, among them King Britt, DJ Spinna, and 4hero (band members include producers Marc Mac and Dego).The album's vintage aesthetic, which saw her take the old and remake it as new, was likely foretold in Watley's updating of her signature classic, "Looking for a New Love", in 2005. As per the title, The Makeover contained newly recorded (and remixed) versions of some of Watley's signature classics like "Don't You Want Me" and "Friends" (re-dubbed "Friendz"), as well as new material. Additionally, Watley paid tribute to musical influences like Diana Ross, Chic, and Karen Carpenter on the covers of "Love Hangover", "I Want Your Love" and a medley of the Carpenters' songs, respectively.

== Background ==
The Makeover, from its title to its photo media, was a tongue-in-cheek commentary on the ever-growing makeover culture now commonplace in contemporary society. Indeed, the album's photography (contained in the liner notes) showed Watley theatrically made-up to resemble a cosmetic surgery recipient. These photos caused a bit of a controversy, however, as they were leaked, after which various online gossip columns (most notably the New York Post's "Page Six"), had falsely reported that Watley had undergone actual cosmetic surgery. Watley jokingly discussed the controversy in the September 11, 2006 issue of the National Enquirer.

== Track listings ==
The Makeover – North American edition
No.	Title	Writer(s)	Producer(s)	Length
1.	"Ms. Jody Watley Intro"	Jody Watley		0:04
2.	"Don't You Want Me" (King Britt's Scuba Mix)	Franne Golde; David Paul Bryant; Watley	King Britt	7:06
3.	"Waiting in Vain"	Bob Marley	Ron Trent	7:11
4.	"A Beautiful Life"	Rodney Lee; Watley	Watley; Lee	4:38
5.	"Bed of Roses" (featuring 4hero)	Watley; Marc Clair	Marc Mac	4:06
6.	"I Want Your Love"	Nile Rogers; Edwards	DJ Spinna	4:20
7.	"Love Hangover"	Marilyn McLeod; Pamela Sawyer	Chris Brann; Watley; Lee	4:43
8.	"Borderline"	Reggie Lucas	Watley; Lee	4:59
9.	"Close To You/Superstar/We've Only Just Begun"	Burt Bacharach; Hal David; The Carpenters	Lee	4:50
10.	"Friendz" (featuring Voshaun Gotti)	André Cymone; Watley; Clair	Milan 'The Mad Scientist' Ross	3:23
11.	"The Makeover (Superstar)"	Lee; Watley	Watley; Lee	3:29
12.	"Midnight Lounge" (Mark de Clive-Lowe Makeover Mix)	Lee; Watley	Mark de Clive-Lowe	4:58
13.	"A Beautiful Life" (A Beautiful Dub)	Lee; Watley	Aris Kokou	7:33
Total length:				58:20

The Makeover – International edition
No.	Title	Writer(s)	Producer(s)	Length
1.	"Ms. Jody Watley Intro"	Watley		0:04
2.	"A Beautiful Life"	Lee; Watley	Watley; Lee	4:41
3.	"I Want Your Love" (DJ Spinna Mix)	Rogers; Edwards	DJ Spinna	4:42
4.	"A Little Respect"	Vince Clarke; Andy Bell	Marco Zappala; Watley	3:59
5.	"Don't You Want Me" (King Britt's Scuba Mix)	Golde; Bryant; Watley	King Britt	7:09
6.	"Looking for a New Love"	Cymone; Watley	Zappala; Watley; Lee	3:48
7.	"Love Hangover"	McLeod; Sawyer	Brann; Watley; Lee	10:04
8.	"Midnight Lounge" (MdCL Remix)	Lee; Watley	Clive-Lowe	4:58
9.	"Waiting in Vain"	Bob Marley	Trent	5:51
10.	"Borderline"	Lucas	Watley; Lee	4:57
11.	"Bed of Roses" (featuring 4hero)	Watley; Clair	Marc Mac	4:07
12.	"Will You Still Love Me Tomorrow"	Gerry Goffin; Carole King	Watley; Lee	3:54
Total length:				58:14

== Singles ==
The first single to be released from The Makeover was a downtempo cover of "Borderline", written by Reggie Lucas and originally a 1984 hit for Madonna. Upon the single's UK release in October 2009, Watley told noted R&B writer Pete Lewis of the award-winning 'Blues & Soul': "'Borderline' is a song I've always liked. Because - even though the way it was originally recorded was very poppy - for me the song always had a melancholy side to it, which I think my version taps into."

The album's second single was "I Want Your Love", a cover of the Chic classic. The Watley cover was produced by DJ Spinna and featured Chic's own Nile Rodgers on guitar. Supported by dance mixes, the track peaked at #1 on the US Billboard Dance Club Songs chart for the week of June 16, 2007.

== Personnel ==
- Jody Watley – Vocals, backing vocals
- Mark Boyce – Moog Synthesizer
- Chris Brann – Keyboards, programming
- Marc Mac – Piano, rhodes, Arp synthesizer, programming
- Luke Parkhouse – Drums, percussion
- Brad Munn – Acoustic guitars
- Andy Hammill – Double bass
- Hillside Stings – Strings
- Nile Rodgers – Guitar
- DJ Spinna – Drum programming
- Selan Lerner – Keyboards
- Ali Black – Assistant engineer
- Rodney Lee – Programming, keyboards
- Mark De Clive-Lowe – Instruments, programming
- Voshaun Gotti – Flow

Production

- Producers – 4hero, King Britt, Mark De Clive-Lowe, DJ Spinna, Rodney Lee, Chris Brann, Milan "The Mad Scientist" Ross
- Executive Producer – Jody Watley
- Remixing producers – Bill Coleman, Vinny Troia
- Project Coordinator – Van Roy for VRC Entertainment
- Photography – Mike Ruiz
- Make-Up – Billy B.
- Hair – Ruth Roche
- Special Effects Makeup – Branan Edgans
- Art Direction – Jody Watley, Van Roy
- Design – David Stafford

== Charts ==
=== Singles ===
Year	Single	Chart	Position
2006	"Borderline"	Dance Club Songs (Billboard)	2
2007	"I Want Your Love"	Dance Club Songs (Billboard)	1
2008	"A Beautiful Life"	Dance Club Songs (Billboard)	5
