= Resist (Kosheen album) =

Studio album by Kosheen
- Released: 17 September 2001
- Genres: Electronic; trip hop; house; drum and bass
- Length: 62:25
- Labels: Moksha; Sony BMG

Kosheen chronology
Resist (2001)	Kokopelli (2003)

Singles from Resist
- 1. "Hide U" / "Empty Skies" Released: 5 May 2000; 2. "Catch" / "Demonstrate" Released: 6 November 2000; 3. "(Slip & Slide) Suicide" Released: 26 March 2001; 4. "Hide U" Released: 20 August 2001 (remix); 5. "Catch" Released: 10 December 2001; 6. "Hungry" Released: 22 April 2002; 7. "Harder" Released: 19 August 2002

Professional ratings
Review scores
Source	Rating
AllMusic	3/5 stars
Laut.de	3/5 stars

Resist is the debut album by English electronic music group Kosheen. The album was first released on 25 June 2001 in the Benelux countries as a limited edition by Moksha Records. The UK edition was then released on September 17 as a sixteen-track record by Sony BMG. The Japanese edition, released in 2003, was a double-CD set containing fifteen B-sides and remixes, plus the exclusive track "Tell Me".

The BBC used the song "Catch" in trailers for Series 1 of 24. "Hide U" and "Pride" were both featured in the soundtrack for FIFA Football 2003.

== Track listings ==
All songs written by Sian Evans, Darren Beale, Mark Morrison 11 & 15 extra writers Jon Hall & Rod Bowkett

Standard edition
No.	Title	Length
1.	"Demonstrate"	0:26
2.	"Hide U"	4:12
3.	"Catch"	3:21
4.	"Cover"	3:48
5.	"Harder"	4:17
6.	"(Slip & Slide) Suicide"	3:34
7.	"Empty Skies"	4:11
8.	"I Want It All"	5:05
9.	"Resist"	4:45
10.	"Hungry"	5:25
11.	"Face in a Crowd"	3:42
12.	"Pride"	4:01
13.	"Cruelty"	4:05
14.	"Let Go"	4:19
15.	"Gone"	3:37
16.	"Hide U" (John Creamer & Stephane K Remix Radio Edit)	3:37
Total length:		62:25

UK enhanced portion bonus
No.	Title	Length
17.	"Hide U" (music video)	3:37

Benelux limited edition
No.	Title	Length
1.	"Demonstrate"	0:26
2.	"Hide U"	4:12
3.	"Catch"	3:21
4.	"Cover"	3:48
5.	"Harder"	4:17
6.	"(Slip & Slide) Suicide"	3:34
7.	"Empty Skies"	4:11
8.	"I Want It All"	5:05
9.	"Resist"	4:45
10.	"Repeat to Fade"	4:38
11.	"Hungry"	5:25
12.	"Face in a Crowd"	3:42
13.	"Pride"	4:01
14.	"Cruelty"	4:05
15.	"Let Go"	4:19
16.	"Playing Games"	4:18
17.	"Gone"	3:37
Total length:		67:44

== Charts ==
=== Weekly charts ===
Chart (2001)	Peak position
Australian Albums (ARIA)	29
Austrian Albums (Ö3 Austria)	18
Belgian Albums (Ultratop Flanders)	8
Dutch Albums (Album Top 100)	25
Finnish Albums (Suomen virallinen lista)	36
German Albums (Offizielle Top 100)	45
UK Albums (Official Charts)	8
US Top Dance Albums (Billboard)	15

=== Year-end charts ===
Chart (2002)	Position
UK Albums (OCC)	99
