= 4hero =

English electronic music band

- Also known as: Tom & Jerry; Jacob's Optical Stairway
- Origin: Dollis Hill, London, England
- Genres: Breakbeat hardcore; jungle; drum and bass; broken beat; nu jazz
- Years active: 1989–present
- Labels: Reinforced Records, Talkin' Loud, PIAS, 2000Black, Raw Canvas
- Members: Mark "Marc Mac" Clair; Denis "Dego" McFarlane
- Past members: Gus Lawrence; Iain Bardouille

4hero (sometimes referred to as 4 Hero or 4-Hero) are an electronic music group from Dollis Hill, London, comprising producers Mark "Marc Mac" Clair & Denis "Dego" McFarlane. 4hero are known for being pioneers of breakbeat hardcore, jungle/drum and bass, broken beat and nu jazz music.

== Early history, 1989–1995 ==
The main players in 4hero first met and came to prominence in the late 1980s when they were involved in the Strong Island FM pirate radio station. Marc Mac and Gus Lawrence set up Reinforced Records in 1989 to release their own productions as 4hero, with the group being completed by Dego and Iain Bardouille. Their first release was the 1990 single "All B 3 / Rising Son".

The follow-up EP, Combat Dancin', underpinned the sub-bass pressure of the bleep 'n' bass artists associated with Sheffield's Warp Records, such as LFO and Nightmares on Wax, with mid-tempo hip-hop-style breakbeats. It also brought the group to the attention of the rave community due to the track "Mr Kirk's Nightmare", which pivoted around the "Get Into Something" break (taken from The Isley Brothers) and a morbid vocal sample ("Mr Kirk? Your son is dead. He died of an overdose.") taken from the Bobby Susser, anti-drug hit "Once You Understand" by Think.

4hero were among the first proponents of what would become known as "drum and bass", which began to grow in profile via a series of releases on Reinforced. Another drum and bass figurehead, Goldie, was introduced to 4hero by his girlfriend DJ Kemistry at a performance in London's Astoria. Marc and Dego went on to teach and collaborate with Goldie which then brought the sounds Goldie envisioned to life, forming the Rufige Cru and Metalheadz monikers.

The band's debut album, In Rough Territory, was released in 1991 on Reinforced Records. This would be the only one of the group's albums to feature Gus and Iain as full members. In early 1993, 4hero would release the darkcore Journey from the Light EP, which according to and referenced by music journalist Simon Reynolds, "If anyone can claim to have invented dark-core, it's 4 Hero". In late 1993, this was followed with Internal Affairs, a collaboration between them and Goldie with vocals from Diane Charlemagne.

Marc Mac and Dego would also record together under the alias "Tom & Jerry" (releasing classics such as "The One Reason", "We Can Be Free", "Maximum Style", and "Air Freshener"), whilst Marc Mac solely as "Manix" (Manic Minds EP, Rainbow People EP, and "Heading to the Light") and Dego as "Tek 9" ("Just a Dream", and Return of Tek 9 EP).

In 1995, NME voted 4hero's second album Parallel Universe the album of the year in its dance category.

== 1996-present ==
In 1997, one of their tracks, a remix of Nuyorican Soul's "Black Gold of the Sun", was released to critical acclaim with Louie Vega describing it as "...one of the best remixes ever...". In 2010, DJ Annie Mac, called 4hero "iconic producers of UK dance and electronic soul", and listed their remix of Nuyorican Soul: I Am the Black Gold of the Sun in her top ten electronic music tracks of all time. In 2011, music journalist Richard Vine listed the same single among "50 key events in the history of dance music". In 2023, 4hero (Mac and Dego) remixed "Lost" by Ada Morghe, who referred to 4hero as "pioneers of drum 'n Bass".

The next year, 4hero rose again to mainstream visibility with their third studio album as 4hero, Two Pages (1998). Released on Gilles Peterson's Talkin' Loud record label, the double CD blended jazzy double bass, flowing breakbeats and a brew of mysticism, spiritualism, astrology, U.F.O.s, and environmentalism. Luke Parkhouse provided the drums while Ursula Rucker, Carol Crosby and Face V. Walsh provided vocals alongside veteran singer Terry Callier and a few other special guests. The album gained critical acclaim and a place on the shortlist for 1998's Mercury Music Prize as well as picking up a MOBO award in the same year. Both this album and artists recording on 4hero's Reinforced label were influential in the development of the broken beat scene.

Between 1998 and 2001, they hosted a Sunday night show with Kirk Degiorgio on Kiss 100 FM under the "R Solution" moniker.

4hero's fourth album, Creating Patterns (2001), featured another Ursula Rucker collaboration, an appearance from Jill Scott, and a cover of Minnie Riperton's classic 1970s song "Les Fleurs" with Carina Andersson as the lead vocalist.

In 2004, the group released a compilation album consisting of two discs. The first disc contained 4hero remixes, while the tracks on disc 2 are remixes of 4hero tracks by other artists. This was released on their new label Raw Canvas. In 2006, 4hero was featured on the track "Bed of Roses" by Jody Watley on her album, The Makeover.

Six years after the release of Creating Patterns, Play with the Changes was released in February 2007 to critical acclaim. Mixmag described it as "their finest album to date" and awarded it the title of Album of the Month in its January 2007 issue.

== Discography ==
=== Albums ===
- In Rough Territory (Reinforced Records, 1991)
- Parallel Universe (Reinforced Records, 1994)
- Jacob's Optical Stairway (as Jacob's Optical Stairway) (R&S Records, 1995)
- Two Pages (Talkin' Loud, 1998)
- Two Pages Remixed (Talkin' Loud, 1998)
- Two Pages Reinterpretations (Talkin' Loud, 1999)
- Creating Patterns (Talkin' Loud, 2001)
- The Remix Album (Raw Canvas Records, 2004)
- Play with the Changes (Raw Canvas Records, 2007)
- Extensions (Raw Canvas Records, 2009)

=== Selected singles/EPs ===
- "All B 3 / Rising Son" (Reinforced Records, 1990)
- "Combat Dancin' / Mr Kirks Nightmare / Move Wid The House Groove" (Reinforced Records, 1990)
- "No Sleep Raver / Marimba" (Reinforced Records, 1991)
- "The Head Hunter" (Reinforced Records, 1991)
- "Cookin Up Ya Brain / Where's the Boy?" (Reinforced Records, 1992)
- "The One Reason" (as Tom & Jerry) (Tom & Jerry, 1992)
- "Journey from the Light" (Reinforced Records, 1993)
- "We Can Be Free / Physics" (as Tom & Jerry) (Tom & Jerry, 1993)
- "Golden Age" (Reinforced Records, 1993)
- Internal Affairs EP (with Goldie as Internal Affairs) (Reinforced Records, 1993)
- "Maximum Style (Lover to Lover) / Dancer" (as Tom & Jerry) (Tom & Jerry, 1994)
- "Maximum Style Remix / Airfreshener" (as Tom & Jerry) (Tom & Jerry, 1994)
- Dreamers (as Cold Mission) (Reinforced Records, 1994)
- Afterglow Pt 1&2 (as Project A-KO) (Reinforced, 1994)
- Universal Love EP (Selector, 1995)
- "Earth Pioneers" (Talkin' Loud, 1997)
- "Loveless" (Talkin' Loud, 1997)
- "Star Chasers" (Talkin' Loud, 1998)
- "We Who Are Not as Others" (Talkin' Loud, 1998)
- "Escape That" (Talkin' Loud, 1999)
- "Les Fleur" (Talkin' Loud, 2001)
- "Morning Child" (Raw Canvas Records, 2007)
- "Look Inside" (featuring Face) (Raw Canvas Records, 2008)

== See also ==
- Reinforced Records

== Articles & Interviews ==
- Cardew, Ben. "4-Hero are jungle legends: part two of two", Line Noise, 24 Jul 2024
- Cardew, Ben. "4-Hero are jungle legends: part one of two", Line Noise, 24 Jul 2024
- Scaruffi, Piero. 4hero, (cultural historian music database)
- Cardew, Ben. "Solid Gold: How 4Hero's 'Two Pages' predicted the future of d&b", DJ Mag, 23 January 2020
- Deadman, Alex. An Interview with Mark `Marc Mac` Courtesy of We Love Jungle' JunleDrumAndBass.Co.UK
- Dolan, Jon & Matos, Michelangelo. "The 30 Greatest EDM Albums of All Time:From Kraftwerk to Daft Punk to Deadmau5, it's been a wild ride on the dance floor". Rolling Stone, 2 August 2012
- Vine, Richard. "A history of dance music: 4hero remix Nuyorican Soul's I Am the Black Gold of the Sun. 1997: Number 32 in our series of the 50 key events in the history of dance music .", The Guardian, Wed 15 Jun 2011
- Bellini, Lara (2009). "4hero presents Extensions Review", BBC Music
- Buttimer, Andrew (2007). "4hero Play With The Changes Review", BBC Music
