= Kemistry =

English drum and bass DJ (1963–1999)

- Born: Valerie Olukemi A Olusanya; 13 October 1963; Birmingham, England
- Died: 25 April 1999 (aged 35); Winchester, Hampshire, England
- Other name: Kemi
- Occupations: Drum and bass DJ; record producer
- Years active: c.1991–1999
- Known for: Kemistry & Storm; Metalheadz

Valerie Olukemi A "Kemi" Olusanya (13 October 1963 – 25 April 1999), commonly known by her stage name Kemistry, was a leading English drum and bass DJ of the early 1990s, half of duo Kemistry & Storm, and co-founder of the Metalheadz record label.

== Career ==
Born in Birmingham, Olusanya grew up in Kettering, Northamptonshire, and began a career as a make-up artist before giving it up for DJing in the early 1990s. She was half of the DJ and recording duo Kemistry & Storm, which she formed with an old friend when they both lived in London. They both started out playing on pirate radio stations Touchdown and Defection FM. With Goldie, they formed the Metalheadz record label. After two and a half years at the label, they moved on to concentrate on DJing and also released a widely distributed mix album, DJ-Kicks: Kemistry & Storm, which has been described as "paving the way for other, younger, female DJs".

The track "Kemistry" by Goldie, originally released in 1992 when they were in a relationship together, and also featured on his 1995 album Timeless, is dedicated to her.

== Death ==
On 25 April 1999, Olusanya was a front-seat passenger in a car travelling on the M3 motorway in Hampshire, when a vehicle in front dislodged a cat's eye, which broke through the windscreen and hit her. The coroner recorded a verdict of accidental death.
