= Doc Scott =

British DJ and producer (born 1971)

- Also known as: Nasty Habits
- Born: Scott McIlroy; 1971 (age 54–55); Coventry, Warwickshire, England
- Genres: Drum and bass, Jungle, Techstep
- Occupations: Producer, DJ
- Labels: Absolute 2, Reinforced Records, Metalheadz, 31 Records

Scott McIlroy (born 1971, Coventry, England), better known as Doc Scott or Nasty Habits, is a British drum and bass DJ and producer.

== Biography ==
He originally started to DJ at clubs and raves such as Amnesia House and The Eclipse in 1989/1990, before appearing all over the country and in the mid 1990s played at the seminal Metalheadz at the Blue Note nights. Goldie has called him "The King of the Rollers".

His first track was "NHS" released on Simon 'Bassline' Smith's label Absolute 2. From there, he would record classics on labels such as Reinforced Records and Metalheadz, such as "Here Come The Drumz / Dark Angel", "Deranged", "VIP Drumz/Unofficial Ghost", and "Shadow Boxing" (released on his own 31 Records label).

Between 2014 and 2018, he hosted the Future Beats show on London's Origin FM.

== Selected discography ==
=== Selected singles/EPs ===
- NHS EP - Surgery (Absolute 2, 1991)
- NHS Second Chapter - NHS (Disco Remix) (Absolute 2, 1992)
- As Nasty As I Want To Be EP - Here Comes The Drumz/Dark Angel/Mayday/Let's Go (as Nasty Habits) (Reinforced Records, 1992)
- Street Knowledge (Reinforced Records, 1993)
- Get Busy Cru/Deranged (with Keith Suckling) (Reinforced Records, 1993)
- VIP Drumz (Metalheadz, 1993)
- Drumz 95/Blue Skies (Metalheadz, 1995)
- Far Away/Its Yours (Metalheadz, 1995)
- Unofficial Ghost (Metalheadz, 1996)
- Tokyo Dawn (Nexus, 1996)
- Shadow Boxing/Prototyped (as Nasty Habits) (31 Records, 1996)

=== Mix compilations ===
- MixMag Live Vol 22: Breakbeat Experiments (MixMag, 1996)
