= Independence (Kosheen album) =

Studio album by Kosheen
- Released: 1 October 2012
- Label: 101 Distribution

Kosheen chronology
Damage (2007)	Independence (2012)	Solitude (2013)

Singles from Independence
- 1. "Get a New One" Released: 13 February 2012; 2. "Mannequin" Released: 16 September 2012; 3. "Addict" Released: 2012

Professional ratings
Review scores
Source	Rating
Gaffa	4/6
Laut.de	2/5 stars
musicOMH	3/5 stars

Independence is Kosheen's fourth studio album released on October 1, 2012. The digital copy of the album from iTunes includes two additional instrumentals, 'Zone 10' and 'Zone 15', as well as a remix of their single 'Spies' by Moth Equals.

== Track listing ==
Independence
No.	Title	Length
1.	"Addict"	4:43
2.	"Get a New One"	5:14
3.	"Tightly"	3:53
4.	"Bella Donna"	3:22
5.	"Dependency"	6:51
6.	"Manic"	3:11
7.	"Zone 8"	3:14
8.	"Mannequin"	6:28
9.	"Something New (Visionz Mix)"	4:04
10.	"Out There"	4:18
11.	"Enter"	5:37
12.	"You Don't Own Me (Dungeon Mix)"	4:45
13.	"Waste"	4:25
14.	"Spies"	3:39

== Independence - The Remixes ==
A limited edition compilation of 8 remixed songs from 'Independence' was released on the 9th of August 2013 by Kosheen.

Independence - The Remixes
No.	Title	Length
1.	"Addict (Kosheen DJs Broken Mix)"
2.	"Get A New One (Dubspeeka Pemix)"
3.	"Mannequin (Malente Remix)"
4.	"Waste (Forest Mix)"
5.	"Dependency (4AM Mix)"
6.	"Get A New One (Sunrise Mix)"
7.	"Belladonna (Visionz Remix)"
8.	"Spies (Moth Equals Mix)"
