= Broken beat =

Electronic dance music genre

- Other names: Bruk
- Stylistic origins: EDM; house; jazz-funk; R&B; acid jazz; dub; drum and bass
- Cultural origins: Late 1990s, London, UK
- Derivative forms: Gqom, Dubstep, UK Funky

Broken beat (sometimes referred to as "bruk") is an electronic dance music genre that emerged in the late 1990s and is characterized by syncopated beats and frenetic, choppy rhythms, often alongside female vocals and elements inspired by 1970s jazz-funk. It has been heavily influenced by styles such as house, drum and bass, hip-hop, techno, acid jazz, and R&B. The eclectic style generally avoided rigid four-on-the-floor rhythms and could make use of samplers, analogue synths, and live instrumentation.

== History ==
Broken beat first appeared in the late 1990s and was pioneered by Bugz in the Attic, IG Culture, and the release of the 4hero album Two Pages was influential on the emerging sound and scene. John Bush from AllMusic called it "about as fusion-soaked as it gets." Appearing in the western parts of London, the genre is also referred to as "West London", mainly because Goya Music's offices were in London's Ladbroke Grove, W11, as were most of the participating artists' studios.

Bugz in the Attic's Neon Phusion, Mark Force, Afronaut and IG Culture are credited with kick-starting the scene with numerous releases under various monikers, and the New Sector Movements releases for People Music. The sound created combined a variety of music styles including funk, soul, and hip-hop. The transition was to a more abstract form of drum and bass. Many artists that started releasing through 4hero's Reinforced label are now considered pioneers of broken beat. Simultaneously, established techno artists like Carl Craig and Stacey Pullen experimented with the music they were making, trying to add jazz elements and breaks to their sound. As the music is still based on classic Detroit techno and usually has a harder sound, it is sometimes referred to as "broken techno". This eclectic mixture was picked up by the Detroit and jazz-affiliated UK techno producers Kirk Degiorgio or As One and Ian O'Brien, who tried to form it into a more soulful variation which further influenced the development of the broken beat genre.

== Influences ==
Broken beat draws from 1970s jazz-funk and has been influenced by artists such as Lonnie Liston Smith, the Mizell Brothers (producers for Donald Byrd, Bobbi Humphrey and Johnny Hammond in the mid-1970s), Herbie Hancock, George Duke, and others. One might also hear in broken beat, echos of disco, 1980s contemporary R&B and funk (Shalamar, Prince), early electronica (Kraftwerk), hip-hop ("Planet Rock"), 1980s new wave (Depeche Mode, New Order), drum and bass, house and techno.

== Scene ==
Regular nights that play this genre of music include Co-op, held at Velvet Rooms, and then a few years later moving on to Plastic People, a famous club located in London, for a number of years before re-launching at East Village - both in Shoreditch. In 2008, Afronaut and Bruce Q (Liquid Fusion) teamed up for monthly Co-op sessions which was launched at Concrete in Birmingham. Liquid Fusion ran every Sunday at the Living Room first (2000-2002) then onto Zinc (2002-2008). It had a following of several hundred weekly. Another night was Inspiration Information, previously at Notting Hill Arts Club which then went on to be at East Village in Shoreditch.
