= Kemistry & Storm =

English drum and bass DJ and recording duo

- Genres: Drum and bass
- Years active: c.1991–1999
- Labels: Metalheadz
- Members: Kemistry; Storm

Kemistry & Storm were an English drum and bass DJ and recording duo composed of Kemistry (Valerie Olukemi A "Kemi" Olusanya) and Storm (Jayne Conneely). They were active in the 1990s. Along with Goldie, they founded the Metalheadz label in 1994.

Appearing mainly on the club scene, recordings by the act include the mix album DJ-Kicks: Kemistry & Storm (1999). They were recognized for being "some of the first women DJs to have a widely distributed album" in a "male-dominated genre of music".

In April 1999, Olusanya died in a car accident at the age of 35.

== History ==
Both Kemistry and Storm grew up in Kettering, where they met and became friends. They kept in touch as their lives diverged over the coming years, working as a make-up artist and in radiography respectively, and gave up their careers to begin DJing when both found themselves living in London in the early 1990s. They first started out on London pirate radio stations Touchdown and Defection FM.

Along with Goldie, whom Kemistry had introduced to the drum and bass scene in the early years of the decade, they founded the Metalheadz record label in 1994. The three musicians led Metalheadz for two-and-a-half years before Kemistry and Storm left the label. The success of their DJ-Kicks album brought them opportunities to DJ internationally and has been described as "paving the way for other, younger, female DJs".

The duo's collaboration came to an end with the death of Kemistry in the early hours of 25 April 1999. As they were returning from a Kemistry & Storm gig in Southampton, a vehicle ahead of theirs dislodged a cat's eye from the road which broke through their windscreen, hitting Kemistry in the passenger seat.

Storm said, "Kemi said that she always felt that she was going to die young. She didn’t want to be old. She said, 'I'm going to be the Marilyn Monroe of this scene. I'm going to be notorious.'"

Kemistry's death rocked the now-global drum and bass scene. Their contemporaries felt the absence of a beloved originator keenly. In time, those peers encouraged Storm to DJ solo and she started playing Kemistry's tracks, drawn from the shared collection she still owns. Jayne Conneely continued performing as DJ Storm.
