= Moksha Recordings =

N English electronic music record company

Moksha Recordings is an English electronic music record company. They mainly release alternative electronic music, an example of this would be S.O.L Arranguez (1996), which uses the classical guitar and vocals from Concierto de Aranjuez mixed with modern house music. They have also released music for bands like The Shamen and Kosheen. The record company was founded in 1986 by Charles Cosh.
