= Decoder (duo) =

English music production duo

- Also known as: Atlas; Beyond Reality; Koda; Psykis; Pure White; Wild Orkid; Orca dubspeeka
- Origin: Bristol, England
- Genre: Drum and bass
- Occupation: Producers
- Years active: 1991–present
- Members: Darren Beale; Mark Caro

Decoder is the collective stage name of drum and bass jungle producers Darren Beale and Mark Caro.

== Biography ==
Beale started his career in 1991 using various aliases, creating some old-school hardcore tracks. He continued with fine tuning the deep jungle sounds under the Orca and Koda aliases on Lucky Spin Records and its sister label, Deejay Recordings, releasing "Tranquility to Earth" in 1994. In 1995 he first used the Decoder pseudonym, pioneering the dark or 'tech step' style of drum & bass, often on Mark Caro's label Tech Itch Recordings.

1997 saw the release of Decoder's Decoded EP. Decoder's releases appeared on various labels, including Breakbeat Culture with Markee Ledge as Decoder & Substance, Tech Itch Recordings, BS1 Records, Hard Leaders, 31 Records and Audio Couture.

Beale's next release, the Encrypted EP, reached number three in Fabio & Grooverider's "Rollers Top Ten" chart in 1998. The Encrypted EP, along with "Headlock", "Deception" and Decoder's collaboration with Mark Caro, EKO, followed. The debut album, Dissection, appeared on Hard Leaders Records in 1998. Decoder was also responsible for remixes of tracks such as Photek's "Rings Around Saturn", Adam F's "Dirty Harry" and Alan McGee's "The Chemical Pilot".

Beale later went on to form a new band called Kosheen with Markee Ledge.

== Discography ==
=== Albums ===
- Dissection (1998)
- Encounters — Decoder & Substance (w/ Markee Ledge) (1999)
- Concussion (2003)
