= Everything but the Girl discography =

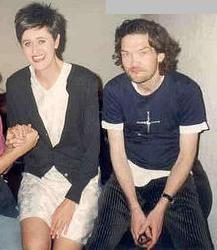
- Tracey Thorn and Ben Watt, 1996
- Studio albums: 11
- Extended plays: 5
- Compilation albums: 10
- Singles: 42
- Video albums: 1

The discography of Everything but the Girl consists of 11 studio albums, eight compilation albums, five extended plays, 32 singles, and one video album.

The band formed in Hull during 1982, consisting of lead singer and occasional guitarist Tracey Thorn and guitarist, keyboardist, and singer Ben Watt.

== Albums ==
=== Studio albums ===
Title	Album details	Peak chart positions										Certifications
Title	Album details	UK	AUS	CAN	FRA	GER	NED	NZ	SWE	SWI	US	Certifications
Eden	Released: 4 June 1984; Label: Blanco y Negro; Formats: LP, CD, cassette	14	—	—	—	—	3	28	—	—	—	BPI: Gold
Love Not Money	Released: 15 April 1985; Label: Blanco y Negro; Formats: LP, CD, cassette	10	—	—	—	51	26	38	—	—	—	BPI: Gold
Baby, the Stars Shine Bright	Released: 25 August 1986; Label: Blanco y Negro; Formats: LP, CD, cassette	22	—	—	—	—	30	40	—	—	—	BPI: Gold
Idlewild	Released: 29 February 1988; Label: Blanco y Negro; Formats: LP, CD, cassette	13	—	—	—	—	—	38	—	—	—	BPI: Gold
The Language of Life	Released: 5 February 1990; Label: Blanco y Negro; Formats: LP, CD, cassette	10	90	—	—	—	61	19	—	—	77	BPI: Gold
Worldwide	Released: 23 September 1991; Label: Blanco y Negro; Formats: LP, CD, cassette	29	164	—	—	—	—	—	—	—	—	
Acoustic	Released: 2 June 1992; Label: Blanco y Negro; Formats: CD, cassette	—	—	—	—	—	—	—	—	—	—	
Amplified Heart	Released: 13 June 1994; Label: Blanco y Negro; Formats: CD, cassette	20	60	32	—	21	—	—	—	20	46	BPI: Gold; RIAA: Gold
Walking Wounded	Released: 6 May 1996; Label: Virgin; Formats: CD, cassette	4	11	19	48	59	52	18	6	33	37	BPI: Platinum; ARIA: Gold; RMNZ: Gold
Temperamental	Released: 27 September 1999; Label: Virgin; Formats: CD, cassette	16	3	29	18	65	—	17	14	—	65	
Fuse	Released: 21 April 2023; Label: Buzzin' Fly, Virgin; Formats: LP, CD, CD+Blu-ray, digital download	3	39	—	52	18	46	27	—	8	116	
Blue Reservoir	Released: 19 February 2027; Label: Buzzin' Fly, Virgin; Formats: LP, CD, CD+Blu-ray, digital download	—	—	—	—	—	—	—	—	—	—	
"—" denotes items that did not chart or were not released in that territory.

=== Compilation albums ===
Title	Album details	Peak chart positions						Certifications
Title	Album details	UK	AUS	NZ	SCO	US Elec	US Indie	Certifications
Everything but the Girl	Released: 1984 (US & Canada only); Label: Sire; Formats: LP, CD, cassette	—	—	—	—	—	—	
Essence & Rare 82–92	Released: 1 December 1992; Label: Toy's Factory	—	—	—	—	—	—	
Home Movies	Released: 10 May 1993; Label: Blanco y Negro	5	183	—	—	—	—	UK: Gold
The Best of Everything but the Girl	Released: 28 October 1996; Label: Blanco y Negro	23	58	30	46	—	—	BPI: Platinum; ARIA: Gold
Back to Mine	Released: 2001; Label: DMC	—	54	—	—	15	15	
Like the Deserts Miss the Rain	Released: 21 October 2002; Label: Blanco y Negro	58	154	—	—	5	—	
Adapt or Die: Ten Years of Remixes	Released: 14 March 2005; Label: Virgin	—	128	—	—	9	—	
The Platinum Collection	Released: 2006; Label: Rhino	—	—	—	—	—	—	
The Works	Released: 2007; Label: Rhino	—	—	—	—	—	—	
The Platinum Collection	Released: 2006; Label: Rhino	—	—	—	—	—	—	
Best of Everything but the Girl (1984-1995)	Released: 2013; Label: Music Club Deluxe; Formats: CD	—	—	—	—	—	—	
The Best of Everything But the Girl	Released: 14 November 2025; Label: Buzzin' Fly, Chrysalis; Formats: LP, CD	—	—	—	—	—	—	
"—" denotes items that did not chart or were not released in that territory.

== Home video ==
Year	Title
1991	Everything But the Girl
1993	Home Movies
2003	Like the Deserts Miss the Rain

== Extended plays ==
Title	EP details	Peak chart positions				
Title	EP details	UK	UK Dance	AUS	IRE	SCO
Covers	Released: February 1992; Label: Blanco y Negro	13	—	136	18	—
The Only Living Boy in New York	Released: April 1993; Label: Blanco y Negro	42	—	191	—	—
I Didn't Know I Was Looking for Love	Released: June 1993; Label: Blanco y Negro	72	—	—	—	—
Rollercoaster	Released: 23 May 1994; Label: Blanco y Negro	65	—	—	—	—
At Maida Vale	Released: 9 August 2023; Label: BBC Studios	—	—	—	—	—
"—" denotes items that did not chart or were not released in that territory.

== Singles ==
Year	Title	Peak chart positions											Certifications	Album
Year	Title	UK	AUS	FRA	GER	IRE	NED	NZ	SWE	SWI	US	US Dance	Certifications	Album
1982	"Night and Day"	92	—	—	—	—	—	—	—	—	—	—		Non-album single
1984	"Each and Every One"	28	—	—	—	19	19	—	—	—	—	—		Eden
1984	"Mine"	58	—	—	—	—	—	—	—	—	—	—		Everything but the Girl
1984	"Native Land"	73	—	—	—	—	—	—	—	—	—	—		Everything but the Girl
1985	"When All's Well"	77	—	—	—	—	—	—	—	—	—	—		Love Not Money
1985	"Angel"	93	—	—	—	—	—	—	—	—	—	—		Love Not Money
1986	"Come on Home"	44	—	—	—	27	49	—	—	—	—	—		Baby, the Stars Shine Bright
1986	"Don't Leave Me Behind"	72	85	—	—	—	—	—	—	—	—	—		Baby, the Stars Shine Bright
1987	"Cross My Heart"	—	—	—	—	—	—	—	—	—	—	—		Baby, the Stars Shine Bright
1988	"These Early Days"	75	—	—	—	—	—	—	—	—	—	—		Idlewild
1988	"I Always Was Your Girl"	87	—	—	—	—	—	—	—	—	—	—		Idlewild
1988	"I Don't Want to Talk About It"	3	—	—	—	3	85	19	—	—	—	—		Idlewild
1989	"Love Is Here Where I Live"	—	—	—	—	—	—	—	—	—	—	—		Idlewild
1990	"Driving"	54	127	—	—	30	—	—	—	—	— (Note: "Driving" did not enter the Hot 100 but peaked at No. 23 at the Adult Contemporary Chart, No. 26 in the Alternative Airlplay Chart and No. 73 in the Hot R&B/Hip-Hop Songs.)	—		The Language of Life
1990	"Take Me"	—	—	—	—	—	—	—	—	—	— (Note: "Take Me" did not chart in the Hot 100 but peaked at No. 30 at the Adult Contemporary Chart in September 1990.)	—		The Language of Life
1991	"Old Friends"	93	—	—	—	—	—	—	—	—	—	—		Worldwide
1991	"Twin Cities"	120	—	—	—	—	—	—	—	—	—	—		Worldwide
1992	"Talk to Me Like the Sea"	—	—	—	—	—	—	—	—	—	—	—		Worldwide
1992	"Love Is Strange"	13	136	—	—	—	—	—	—	—	—	—		Covers
1993	"The Only Living Boy in New York"	42	191	—	—	—	—	—	—	—	—	—		Home Movies
1993	"I Didn't Know I Was Looking for Love"	72	—	—	—	—	—	—	—	—	—	—		Home Movies
1994	"Rollercoaster"	65	—	—	—	—	—	—	—	—	—	—		Amplified Heart
1994	"Missing"	69	—	—	—	—	—	—	—	—	—	—	RMNZ: Platinum	Amplified Heart
1995	"Missing" (Todd Terry Remix)	3	2	2	1	3	3	14	3	2	2	— (Note: "Missing" did not chart in the Dance Club Songs chart but peaked at No. 1 at the Dance Singles Sales in January 1996.)	BPI: 3× Platinum; ARIA: Platinum; BVMI: Gold; RIAA: Gold; SNEP: Gold	Amplified Heart
1996	"Walking Wounded"	6	30	—	—	29	—	31	34	41	—	—		Walking Wounded
1996	"Mirrorball"	—	—	—	—	—	—	—	—	—	—	—		Walking Wounded
1996	"Wrong"	8	36	43	59	20	—	29	47	41	68	1		Walking Wounded
1996	"Single"	20	102	—	—	—	—	—	—	—	—	—		Walking Wounded
1996	"Driving" (Todd Terry Mix)	36	127	—	—	—	—	—	—	—	—	—		The Best of Everything but the Girl
1997	"Before Today"	25	146	—	—	—	—	—	—	—	—	— (Note: "Before Today" did not chart in the Dance Club Songs chart but peaked at No. 46 at the Dance Singles Sales in May 1997.)		Walking Wounded
1998	"The Future of the Future (Stay Gold)" (Deep Dish with EBTG)	31	58	—	—	—	—	—	—	—	—	1		Temperamental
1999	"Five Fathoms (Love More)"	27	111	—	—	—	—	—	—	—	—	1		Temperamental
1999	"Blame"	—	—	—	—	—	—	—	—	—	—	—		Temperamental
2000	"Temperamental"	72	—	—	—	—	—	—	—	—	—	1		Temperamental
2000	"Lullaby of Clubland"	—	—	—	—	—	—	—	—	—	—	3		Temperamental
2001	"Tracey in My Room" (EBTG vs Soul Vision)	34	76	—	—	—	—	—	—	—	—	—		Like the Deserts Miss the Rain
2002	"Corcovado"	—	—	—	—	—	—	—	—	—	—			Like the Deserts Miss the Rain
2023	"Nothing Left to Lose"	—	—	—	—	—	—	—	—	—	—	—		Fuse
2023	"Caution to the Wind"	—	—	—	—	—	—	—	—	—	—	—		Fuse
2023	"Run a Red Light"	—	—	—	—	—	—	—	—	—	—	—		Fuse
2023	"No One Knows We're Dancing"	—	—	—	—	—	—	—	—	—	—	—		Fuse
2026	"Run a Red Light (Logistics Remix)"	—	—	—	—	—	—	—	—	—	—	—		Fuse
2026	"Young and Dumb"	—	—	—	—	—	—	—	—	—	—	—		Blue Reservoir
"—" denotes items that did not chart or were not released in that territory.

== Music videos ==
Title	Year	Director(s)	Ref.
"On My Mind"	1983	Chris Collins	
"Each and Every One"	1984	John Maybury	
"Mine"	1984	John Maybury	
"Native Land"	1984	John Maybury	
"When All's Well"	1985	Tim Pope	
"Come on Home"	1986	Mike Brady	
"Don't Leave Me Behind"	1986	Mike Brady	
"These Early Days"	1988	John Maybury	
"I Don't Want to Talk About It "	1988	Richard Haughton	
"Love Is Where I Live"	1988	Richard Haughton	
"Driving"	1990	Michael Geoghagan	
"Take Me"	1990	Michael Geoghagan	
"Old Friends"	1991	Daniel Kleinman	
"Love Is Strange"	1992	Unknown	
"The Only Boy Living in New York"	1993	Hal Hartley	
"Rollercoaster"	1994	Katherine Dieckmann	
"Missing"	1994	Mark Szaszy	
"Missing (Todd Terry Remix)"	1995	Mark Szaszy	
"Walking Wounded"	1996	Hal Hartley	
"Wrong"	1996	Big TV!	
"Driving (Todd Terry Mix)"	1996	Michael Geoghegan	
"Single"	1996	Edmundo	
"The Future of the Future (Stay Gold)"	1998	Huds	
"Five Fathoms"	1999	Mark Szaszy	
"Temperamental"	1999	Mike Mills	
"Nothing Left to Lose"	2023	Charlie Di Placido	
"Run a Red Light"	2023	Charlie Di Placido	
