= The Best of Everything but the Girl =

Greatest hits album by Everything but the Girl
- Released: 28 October 1996
- Recorded: 1982–1994
- Genre: Pop
- Length: 58:12
- Labels: Blanco y Negro (Europe); Atlantic (US)

Everything but the Girl chronology
| Amplified Heart (1994) | The Best of Everything but the Girl (1996) | Walking Wounded (1996) |

Singles from The Best of
- 1. "Driving" Released: 25 November 1996

Professional ratings
Review scores
| Source | Rating |
|---|---|
| AllMusic | 4.5/5 stars |

The Best of Everything but the Girl is a compilation album by English musical duo Everything but the Girl, released in 1996.

== Track listing ==
1. "Missing" (Todd Terry Remix) from Amplified Heart
2. "Driving" (Todd Terry Remix) Previously unreleased mix
3. "Old Friends" from Worldwide
4. "One Place" from Worldwide
5. "I Don't Want to Talk About It" from Idlewild
6. "Love Is Strange" from Acoustic
7. "The Only Living Boy in New York" from Home Movies
8. "Apron Strings" from Idlewild
9. "When All's Well" from Love Not Money
10. "Another Bridge" from Eden
11. "Each and Every One" from Eden
12. "Rollercoaster" from Amplified Heart
13. "Driving" (The Underdog Remix) Previously unreleased mix
14. "Better Things" (Massive Attack with Tracey Thorn) from Protection
15. "Protection" (Massive Attack with Tracey Thorn) from Protection

== Charts ==
| Chart (1996) | Peak position |
|---|---|
| New Zealand Albums (RMNZ) | 30 |
| Scottish Albums (Official Charts) | 46 |
| UK Albums (Official Charts) | 23 |

== Certifications ==
| Region | Certification | Certified units/sales |
|---|---|---|
| Australia (ARIA) | Gold | 35,000^{^} |
| United Kingdom (BPI) | Platinum | 300,000^{^} |
^{^} Shipments figures based on certification alone.
