= Like the Deserts Miss the Rain =

Greatest hits album by Everything but the Girl
- Released: 21 October 2002
- Recorded: 1984–1999
- Length: 69:21
- Label: Atlantic (US); Virgin/Blanco y Negro (Europe)

Everything but the Girl chronology
Temperamental (1999)	Like the Deserts Miss the Rain (2002)	Adapt or Die: Ten Years of Remixes (2005)

Professional ratings
Review scores
Source	Rating
AllMusic	link

Like the Deserts Miss the Rain is a compilation album by the British band Everything but the Girl, released in 2002. Some copies include a bonus disc featuring four additional songs. An accompanying DVD with the same title was also released the same year. The album's title derives from a lyric from their song "Missing", off 1994's Amplified Heart.

== Track listing ==
No.	Title	Writer(s)	Taken From	Length
1.	"My Head Is My Only House Unless It Rains"	Don Van Vliet	B-side of "I Didn't Know I Was Looking For Love" (1993)	2:56
2.	"Rollercoaster"	Ben Watt	Amplified Heart (1994)	3:13
3.	"Corcovado"	Antônio Carlos Jobim; Gene Lees	Red Hot + Rio (1996)	3:53
4.	"Each and Every One"	Tracey Thorn; Watt	Eden (1984)	2:47
5.	"Before Today" (Chicane remix)	Watt	B-side of "Before Today" (1997)	6:23
6.	"Mine"	Thorn	Everything but the Girl (1984)	3:19
7.	"Protection" (Massive Attack with Tracey Thorn)	Robert Del Naja; Grant Marshall; Andrew Vowles; Thorn	Protection (1994)	7:48
8.	"Single" (Photek remix)	Thorn; Watt	B-side of "Single" (1996)	5:14
9.	"Tracey in My Room" (Lazy Dog Bootleg vocal mix) (with Soul Vision)	Jose Burgos; Sandy Rivera; Watt; Thorn	A-side of "Tracey in My Room" (2001)	5:42
10.	"Missing" (Todd Terry remix)	Thorn; Watt	B-side of "Missing" (1994)	3:55
11.	"Almost Blue"	Elvis Costello	B-side of "I Always Was Your Girl" (1988)	3:16
12.	"No Difference"	Thorn; Watt	Temperamental (1999)	4:21
13.	"Cross My Heart"	Thorn; Watt	Baby, the Stars Shine Bright (1986)	3:35
14.	"Mirrorball"	Thorn; Watt	Walking Wounded (1996)	3:26
15.	"A Piece of My Mind"	Thorn	B-side of "I Didn't Know I Was Looking For Love" (1993)	3:25
16.	"Walking Wounded"	John Coxon; Ashley Wales; Watt	Walking Wounded (1996)	6:07

Limited edition bonus disc
No.	Title	Writer(s)	Taken From	Length
1.	"Gun Cupboard Love"	Thorn	B-side of "Mine" (1984)	2:50
2.	"Alfie"	Burt Bacharach; Hal David	B-side of "Don't Leave Me Behind" (1986)	2:48
3.	"Take Me" (Clifton mix)	Cecil Womack; Linda Womack	B-side of "Take Me" (1990)	5:04
4.	"Pigeons In The Attic Room"	Thorn; Watt	B-side of "Angel" (1985)	1:42

=== DVD ===
Videos

1. "Missing" (Todd Terry Remix)
2. "Single"
3. "The Only Living Boy in New York"
4. "Temperamental"
5. "Love Is Here Where I Live"
6. "Five Fathoms"
7. "Each and Every One"
8. "Driving"
9. "Walking Wounded"

Live

1. "Before Today"
2. "Temperamental"
3. "Protection"

Demos

1. "Frozen River"
2. "Mirrorball"
3. "Flipside"

Extras include: Photo gallery, interactive video mix of "Temperamental"

== Charts ==
Chart (2002–2003)	Peak position
Australian Albums (ARIA)	154
UK Albums (OCC)	58
US Top Dance Albums (Billboard)	5

Chart (2023)	Peak position
UK Dance Albums (OCC)	17
