= Everything but the Girl (disambiguation) =

Everything But the Girl may refer to:

- Everything but the Girl, a British band
  - Everything but the Girl (album), album by Everything but the Girl
- Everything But the Girl (song), a song by Swedish singer Darin
