= Baby, the Stars Shine Bright =

Baby, the Stars Shine Bright may refer to:

- Baby, the Stars Shine Bright (album), released in 1986 by British musical duo Everything but the Girl
- Baby, the Stars Shine Bright (brand), Japanese clothing brand created in 1988
