= Each and Every One =

Single by Everything but the Girl

from the album Eden
- B-side: "Laugh You Out the House"; "Never Could Have Been Worse" (12" only)
- Released: 23 April 1984
- Studio: Powerplant Studios, London
- Genre: Pop; bossa nova
- Label: Blanco y Negro Records
- Songwriters: Ben Watt; Tracey Thorn
- Producer: Robin Millar

Everything but the Girl singles chronology
"Night and Day" (1983)	"Each and Every One" (1984)	"Mine" (1984)

"Each and Every One" is the second single by the British music duo Everything but the Girl, that reached #28 in the UK charts in May 1984. It was the only single from the album Eden and the US album Everything but the Girl.

== Background ==
The song has often been misinterpreted as a love song, but the lyrics are a response to the patronising tone used by many male writers when covering Tracey Thorn's earlier all-female group Marine Girls in the British music press.

== Critical reception ==
In May 1984, the single and the Eden album were reviewed by three panellists on the BBC2 programme, 8 Days a Week. George Michael stated that he liked the single and loved Tracey Thorn's "beautiful voice", and added that "Plain Sailing" was his favourite track of hers. Morrissey stated that he did not like the single, but that he liked "at least half of the album". He added that he thought "Another Bridge" from the album "is really quite spectacular". Tony Blackburn stated that he liked the bossa nova rhythm of the single, which he described as "an old sound come back again".

== Track listing ==
7" Single

1. "Each and Every One" (Ben Watt and Tracey Thorn) – 2:45
2. "Laugh You Out the House" (Thorn) – 1:45

12" Single

1. "Each and Every One" – 2:45
2. "Laugh You Out the House" – 1:45
3. "Never Could Have Been Worse" (Watt) – 2:39

== Personnel ==
- Tracey Thorn – vocals
- Ben Watt – guitar, piano, arrangements, vocals
- Chucho Merchán – bass
- Charles Hayward – drums
- Bosco De Oliveira – percussion
- Dick Pearce – flugelhorn
- Nigel Nash – tenor saxophone
- Pete King – alto saxophone

=== Technical ===
- Mike Pela – engineering
- Simon Halfon – cover design

== Charts ==
=== Weekly charts ===
Chart (1984)	Peak position
Netherlands (Dutch Top 40)	9
Netherlands (Single Top 100)	19
UK Singles (OCC)	28

=== Year-end charts ===
Chart (1984)	Position
Netherlands (Dutch Top 40)	72
