= Amy Belle =

Scottish singer

Amy Belle (born 1981) is a Scottish singer. She is known for her duet with Rod Stewart on "I Don't Want To Talk About It" during his concert at the Albert Hall in October 2004. The official Rod Stewart video of the performance has received almost 1.3 billion worldwide (excluding UK) YouTube views. In addition, another YouTube posting of this event has received over 100 million views.

== Biography ==
Belle was born and raised in Glasgow, Scotland, the youngest sibling of three. She started out busking covers of R.E.M. and Alanis Morissette.

At 17, she left Glasgow and moved to London to pursue a career in music. In 2001, she was signed to a short-lived manufactured pop-folk group called the Alice Band. In 2004, Belle was spotted by a friend of Stewart's when she was busking outside an underground station.

After the duet with Stewart, Belle moved to Los Angeles through contacts she made via Stewart's manager. There she recorded a track with Robby Krieger and Ray Manzarek from The Doors. Within three years, she had returned to performing in the United Kingdom.
