= Acoustic (Everything but the Girl album) =

Studio album by Everything but the Girl
- Released: 2 June 1992
- Recorded: November 1991 – March 1992
- Genre: Sophisti pop
- Length: 40:55
- Label: Blanco y Negro
- Producer: Everything but the Girl

Everything but the Girl chronology
Worldwide (1991)	Acoustic (1992)	Essence & Rare 82–92 (1992)

Professional ratings
Review scores
Source	Rating
AllMusic	2.5/5 stars
The Rolling Stone Album Guide	3/5 stars
Spin Alternative Record Guide	8/10

Acoustic is the seventh studio album by Everything but the Girl, released in North America on 2 June 1992. It consists of Everything but the Girl's covers of six songs by other artists as well as two live recordings and four re-recordings of songs from the duo's repertoire. In the United Kingdom, the duo had released the Covers EP for Blanco y Negro, which had peaked at number 13 on the UK Singles chart dated 7 March 1992, with this release expanded into a full album for its release abroad.

The albums Worldwide (1991) and Acoustic were reissued together by Edsel Records as a 2-disc set in 2012. This release also included the 1992 EP "The Only Living Boy in New York" and 1993's "I Didn't Know I Was Looking for Love".

== Track listing ==
Covers EP (UK 1992)
No.	Title	Writer(s)	Length
1.	"Love Is Strange"	Ethel Smith, Sylvia Robinson, Mickey Baker	3:20
2.	"Tougher Than the Rest"	Bruce Springsteen	4:14
3.	"Time After Time"	Cyndi Lauper, Rob Hyman	4:29
4.	"Alison"	Elvis Costello	3:04
Total length:			16:07

Acoustic (US 1992)
No.	Title	Writer(s)	Length
1.	"Love Is Strange"	Ethel Smith, Sylvia Robinson, Mickey Baker	3:20
2.	"Tougher Than the Rest"	Bruce Springsteen	4:14
3.	"Time After Time"	Cyndi Lauper, Rob Hyman	4:29
4.	"Alison"	Elvis Costello	3:04
5.	"Downtown Train"	Tom Waits	3:08
6.	"Driving" (Acoustic)	Ben Watt	2:25
7.	"One Place" (Acoustic)	Tracey Thorn	4:50
8.	"Apron Strings" (Live)	Thorn, Watt	2:54
9.	"Me and Bobby D" (Acoustic)	Thorn, Watt	4:23
10.	"Come on Home" (Acoustic)	Thorn, Watt	4:12
11.	"Fascination" (Live)	Thorn	4:17
Total length:			41:20

Some digital downloads of the album – including those sold by Amazon and iTunes – have the fully orchestrated version of "Come on Home" (3:22) from Baby, the Stars Shine Bright rather than the pared back version from Acoustic. The error appears to be the recording company's.

Worldwide and the Acoustic EPs (2012 reissue CD2)
No.	Title	Writer(s)	Length
1.	"Love Is Strange"	Ethel Smith, Sylvia Robinson, Mickey Baker	3:23
2.	"Tougher Than The Rest"	Bruce Springsteen	4:13
3.	"Time After Time"	Cyndi Lauper, Rob Hyman	4:27
4.	"Allison"	Elvis Costello	3:06
5.	"The Only Living Boy in New York"	Paul Simon	4:13
6.	"Gabriel"	Thorn; Watt	2:32
7.	"Birds"	Neil Young	2:23
8.	"Horses in the Room"	Watt	2:59
9.	"I Didn't Know I Was Looking for Love"	Thorn; Watt	4:19
10.	"My Head is My Only House Unless It Rains"	Don Van Vliet	2:58
11.	"Political Science"	Randy Newman	2:15
12.	"A Piece of my Mind"	Thorn	3:30
13.	"I Didn't Know I Was Looking for Love" (Home demo)	Thorn; Watt	3:43
14.	"Thirteen" (Unreleased studio demo)	Alex Chilton; Chris Bell	2:41
15.	"Kotton Krown" (Live in Toronto, Bathurst Street Theater, 1994)	Kim Gordon; Lee Ranaldo; Steve Shelley; Thurston Moore	2:33
16.	"Talk to Me Like the Sea" (Live in Toronto, Bathurst Street Theater, 1994)	Watt	4:09
17.	"Will You Still Love Me Tomorrow?" (Live in Queen's Theatre, London, 1992)	Gerry Goffin; Carole King	3:49
18.	"Let It Be Me" (Live in Hammersmith Odeon, 1990)	Gilbert Bécaud, Manny Curtis, Pierre Delanoë	2:42
19.	"Apron Strings" (Live in Minneapolis & St Paul World Theatre, 1990)	Thorn; Watt	2:49
20.	"Back to the Old House" (Live in Hammersmith Odeon, 1990)	Johnny Marr; Morrissey	3:49
21.	"Fascination" (Live in Manchester)	Thorn	4:10
Total length:			1:09:50

== Personnel ==
Everything but the Girl

- Tracey Thorn – vocals
- Ben Watt – guitar, piano, vocals

with:

- Damon Butcher – keyboards
- Dick Oatts – soprano saxophone
- Martin Ditcham – percussion
- Steve Pearce – bass

Technical

- Jerry Boys, Tony Harris – engineer
- Richard Haughton – photography
