= Home Movies (album) =

Greatest hits album by Everything but the Girl
- Released: 10 May 1993
- Recorded: 1983–1993
- Label: Blanco y Negro Records
- Producer: Various

Everything but the Girl chronology
Essence & Rare 82–92 (1992)	Home Movies (1993)	Amplified Heart (1994)

Singles from Home Movies
- 1. "The Only Living Boy in New York" Released: 12 April 1993; 2. "I Didn't Know I Was Looking for Love" Released: 7 June 1993

Professional ratings
Review scores
Source	Rating
AllMusic	4/5 stars
Music Week	3/5 stars

Home Movies is a compilation album by Everything but the Girl featuring songs from seven of their first eight studio albums (there is nothing from their second album, Love Not Money) as well as two newly recorded songs, a cover of Simon & Garfunkel's "The Only Living Boy in New York" and the band's own "I Didn't Know I Was Looking for Love". The album was released in 1993 and reached number 5 on the UK Albums Chart.

== Singles ==
The band's cover of Simon & Garfunkel's "The Only Living Boy in New York" was released as a single and spent 5 weeks in the UK Singles Chart, peaking at number 42. A music video was directed by Hal Hartley.

The second and final single released from the album was "I Didn't Know I Was Looking for Love", which peaked at number 72 on the UK chart. The song was later covered by Karen Ramirez, re-titled "Looking for Love", and spent 11 weeks on the UK chart, peaking at number 8.

== Track listing ==
All songs written by Tracey Thorn and Ben Watt, except where noted.

1. "Each and Every One"
2. "Another Bridge"
3. "Fascination" (Thorn)
4. "Native Land"
5. "Come On Home"
6. "Cross My Heart"
7. "Apron Strings"
8. "I Don't Want to Talk About It" (Danny Whitten)
9. "The Night I Heard Caruso Sing" (Watt)
10. "Driving" (Watt)
11. "Imagining America" (Watt)
12. "Understanding"
13. "Twin Cities" (Watt)
14. "Love Is Strange" (Mickey Baker, Sylvia Vanderpool, Ethel Smith)
15. "I Didn't Know I Was Looking for Love"
16. "The Only Living Boy in New York" (Paul Simon)

== Video ==
A companion music video compilation, also titled Home Movies, was released simultaneously with the album featuring the following videos.

Thorn wrote of the shoot for the "Mine" video in 1984, "[It was] filmed in a stupefyingly hot studio, where my make-up melted and had to be reapplied throughout the day, till by evening it was inches thick on my face and made me look like Jackie Stallone".

1. "Each And Every One"
2. "Mine"
3. "Native Land" – video directed by John Maybury
4. "When All's Well" – video directed by Tim Pope
5. "Come On Home"
6. "Don't Leave Me Behind"
7. "These Early Days"
8. "I Don't Want To Talk About It"
9. "Love Is Here Where I Live"
10. "Driving"
11. "Take Me"
12. "Old Friends" – video directed by Danny Kleinman
13. "Love Is Strange"
14. "The Only Living Boy In New York" – video directed by Hal Hartley

== Charts ==
Chart performance for Home Movies
Chart (1993)	Peak position
Australian Albums (ARIA)	183
UK Official Album Chart	5
