= The Stars of Heaven =

Former Irish guitar pop band

- Origin: Dublin, Ireland
- Genres: Indie pop
- Years active: 1985–1990
- Labels: Hotwire, Rough Trade
- Past members: Stephen Ryan; Stan Erraught; Peter O'Sullivan; Bernard Walsh

The Stars of Heaven were an Irish guitar pop band formed in Dublin in 1983. They released two albums on the Rough Trade label before splitting up in 1990.

== History ==
The band was formed in 1983 by Stephen Ryan (vocals, guitar), Stan Erraught (guitar, formerly of The Peridots), Peter O'Sullivan (bass guitar), and Bernard Walsh (drums). They were strongly influenced by The Byrds and Gram Parsons, even being labelled "Ireland's answer to The Byrds, Gram Parsons and the Velvet Underground all in one package". After a début single on the Hotwire label ("Clothes of Pride") which received airplay from John Peel, they were signed by Rough Trade, who issued the album Sacred Heart Hotel in 1986, which reached number 11 on the UK Independent Chart. Peel's patronage continued throughout their career, with the band recording four sessions for his BBC Radio 1 show, the first of which was included on Sacred Heart Hotel. They also appeared on RTÉ television. They released a further single and EP ("Never Saw You"/The Holyhead EP) which was a top five hit on the independent chart, and in 1988, Rough Trade released their second and final album, Speak Slowly, which peaked at number 6. Speak Slowly included the track The Lights of Tetouan although this was not released as a single. The song is written by the band's singer, Stephen Ryan, about growing up on the south coast of Spain from where he could see the Moroccan town of Tetouan. The Lights of Tetouan was recorded (as The Lights of Te Touan) by Everything But the Girl, and released as a b-side on their 1994 EP Rollercoaster

The band split up shortly after the release of Speak Slowly, with Ryan going on to form a new band, The Revenants, along with former members of The Would-Be's and Something Happens, who released two albums (Horse of a Different Colour and Septober Nowonder) in 1993 and 1995 respectively. Erraught went on to form The Sewing Room, with Eamonn Davis and Colm Fitzpatrick from Hey Paulette, which released two albums and an EP during the mid-to-late 1990s.

In 2009 the group's two albums were made available as a free download from the Independent Records website.

== Discography ==
=== Albums ===
- Sacred Heart Hotel (1986), Rough Trade - UK Indie #11
- Speak Slowly (1988), Rough Trade - UK Indie #6

Compilations

- Rain on the Sea (1987), Rough Trade - Sacred Heart Hotel + The Holyhead EP
- Unfinished Dreaming (1999), Independent

=== Singles, EPs ===
- "Clothes of Pride" (1985), Hotwire
- "Never Saw You" (1987), Rough Trade
- The Holyhead EP (1987), Rough Trade - UK Indie #5
