= Amplified Heart =

Studio album by Everything but the Girl
- Released: 13 June 1994
- Recorded: December 1993 – April 1994
- Studios: Livingston, London; Strongroom, London; Battery, London; Mayfair, London; Whitfield Street Recording, London
- Genre: Folk-pop
- Length: 36:32
- Labels: Blanco y Negro; Atlantic
- Producers: Tracey Thorn; Ben Watt; John Coxon

Everything but the Girl chronology
Home Movies (1993)	Amplified Heart (1994)	Walking Wounded (1996)

Singles from Amplified Heart
- 1. "Rollercoaster" Released: 23 May 1994 (EP); 2. "Missing" Released: 8 August 1994; 3. "Missing (Todd Terry Remix)" Released: 16 October 1995

Professional ratings
Review scores
Source	Rating
AllMusic	4.5/5 stars
The Encyclopedia of Popular Music	4/5 stars
Entertainment Weekly	B+
Knoxville News Sentinel	4/5 stars
Los Angeles Times	3/4 stars
Pitchfork	8.6/10
The Rolling Stone Album Guide	3.5/5 stars
Spin Alternative Record Guide	9/10

Amplified Heart is the eighth studio album by English musical duo Everything but the Girl. It was released on 13 June 1994 by Blanco y Negro Records in the U.K. and on 19 July 1994 by Atlantic Records in the United States and Canada. The album was recorded and mixed in London from winter 1993 to 1994.

Primarily an acoustic-driven set, Amplified Heart brought Everything but the Girl to mainstream audiences via the dance remix of the song "Missing". Ultimately peaking at number 2 on the US Billboard Hot 100 singles chart in early 1996, "Missing" spent more than a year gaining airplay and exposing Everything but the Girl to US and worldwide audiences, leading Amplified Heart to sell upwards of 232,000 copies in the United States, according to Nielsen SoundScan. It went on to sell over 1,000,000 copies worldwide.

Amplified Heart was reissued in 2012 by Edsel Records as a two-disc deluxe set.

A 25th anniversary pressing of the album on vinyl was released in 2019. The Todd Terry club mix of "Missing" is not on the vinyl and it was added on to later pressings of the CD as a bonus track.

== Track listing ==
All music is composed by Ben Watt, except where noted.

No.	Title	Lyrics	Music	Length
1.	"Rollercoaster"	Ben Watt		3:14
2.	"Troubled Mind"	Tracey Thorn		3:34
3.	"I Don't Understand Anything"	Thorn	Thorn	4:25
4.	"Walking to You"	Watt		3:30
5.	"Get Me"	Watt		3:34
6.	"Missing"	Thorn		4:06
7.	"Two Star"	Watt		4:06
8.	"We Walk the Same Line"	Thorn	Thorn	4:00
9.	"25th December"	Watt		4:04
10.	"Disenchanted"	Thorn		2:03

Bonus track on later editions
No.	Title	Lyrics	Music	Length
11.	"Missing" (Todd Terry club mix)	Thorn	Watt	4:55

=== 2012 Edsel Records reissue ===
Disc 1
No.	Title	Lyrics	Music	Length
1.	"Rollercoaster"	Watt		3:14
2.	"Troubled Mind"	Thorn		3:34
3.	"I Don't Understand Anything"	Thorn	Thorn	4:25
4.	"Walking to You"	Watt		3:30
5.	"Get Me"	Watt		3:34
6.	"Missing"	Thorn		4:06
7.	"Two Star"	Watt		4:06
8.	"We Walk the Same Line"	Thorn	Thorn	4:00
9.	"25th December"	Watt		4:04
10.	"Disenchanted"	Thorn		2:03
11.	"Straight Back to You"	Watt		4:38
12.	"Lights of Te Touan"	Stephen Ryan	Ryan	2:29
13.	"These Days" (live)	Jackson Browne	Browne	3:24
14.	"Each and Every One" (live)	Watt	Thorn	3:57
15.	"I Don't Want to Talk About It" (live)	Danny Whitten	Whitten	3:13

Disc 2
No.	Title	Lyrics	Music	Length
1.	"I Don't Understand Anything" (home demo)	Thorn	Thorn	4:17
2.	"Rollercoaster" (home demo)	Watt		3:13
3.	"Two Star" (home demo)	Watt		2:57
4.	"Troubled Mind" (home demo)	Thorn		3:48
5.	"We Walk the Same Line" (home demo)	Thorn	Thorn	3:46
6.	"Richard Says" (home demo)	Thorn	Thorn	2:24
7.	"Back at Square One" (home demo)	Thorn		3:31
8.	"Two Star" (Harry Robinson's string arrangement demo)	Watt		4:06
9.	"Missing" (live)	Thorn		7:41
10.	"Troubled Mind" (live)	Thorn		4:42
11.	"Two Star" (live)	Thorn		5:23
12.	"Walking to You" (live)	Watt		3:35
13.	"25 December" (live)	Watt		4:37
14.	"Missing" (Chris & James Full On club mix)	Thorn		8:35
15.	"Missing" (Little Joey remix)	Thorn		5:03
16.	"Missing" (Ultramarine remix)	Thorn		5:27
17.	"Missing" (Todd Terry club mix, Ben Watt's 'Blanco-Eternal' radio edit)	Thorn		3:54

== Personnel ==
Credits for Amplified Heart adapted from liner notes.

Everything but the Girl

- Tracey Thorn – vocals, production
- Ben Watt – acoustic and electric guitars, acoustic and electric piano, mini Moog, vocals, mixing, production

Additional musicians

- John Coxon – keyboards and production on "Troubled Mind", "Get Me" and "Missing"
- Danny Thompson – double bass
- Dave Mattacks – drums
- Martin Ditcham – percussion
- Harry Robinson – string arrangements on "I Don't Understand Anything" and "Two Star", conductor
- Peter King – alto saxophone on "Disenchanted"
- Kate St John – Cor Anglais on "Two Star"
- Richard Thompson – lead electric guitar on "25 December"

Production

- Mads Bjerke – engineering
- Jerry Boys – engineering, mixing
- Bruce Davies – mixing
- Jon Mallison – engineering

Design

- Corinne Day – inner sleeve photography
- Everything but the Girl – design
- Richard Haughton – cover and inner sleeve photography
- The Senate – design
- Ponyboy Wildwood – inner sleeve photography

== Charts ==
=== Weekly charts ===
Chart (1994–96)	Peak position
Australian Albums (ARIA)	60
Austrian Albums (Ö3 Austria)	36
Canada Top Albums/CDs (RPM)	32
German Albums (Offizielle Top 100)	21
Scottish Albums (Official Charts)	97
Swiss Albums (Schweizer Hitparade)	20
UK Albums (Official Charts)	20
US Billboard 200	46

=== Year-end charts ===
Chart (1996)	Position
US Billboard 200	170

== Certifications ==
Region	Certification	Certified units/sales
United Kingdom (BPI)	Gold	100,000^{^}
United States (RIAA)	Gold	500,000^{^}
^{^} Shipments figures based on certification alone.
