= The Language of Life =

Studio album by Everything but the Girl
- Released: 5 February 1990
- Recorded: 1989
- Studio: Bill Schnee Studios (Los Angeles); Sunset Sound (Los Angeles); Ocean Way Recording (Los Angeles)
- Genre: Sophisti-pop; blue-eyed soul; smooth jazz
- Length: 41:25
- Label: Atlantic; Blanco y Negro
- Producer: Tommy LiPuma

Everything but the Girl chronology
Idlewild (1988)	The Language of Life (1990)	Worldwide (1991)

Singles from The Language of Life
- 1. "Driving" Released: 1990; 2. "Take Me" Released: 26 March 1990

Professional ratings
Review scores
Source	Rating
AllMusic	2/5 stars
Entertainment Weekly	B−
NME	4/10
The Philadelphia Inquirer	3/4 stars
Q	4/5 stars
Record Collector	3/5 stars
Record Mirror	4/5
Rolling Stone	4/5 stars
The Rolling Stone Album Guide	2/5 stars
Spin Alternative Record Guide	7/10

The Language of Life is the fifth studio album by British musical duo Everything but the Girl. It was released on 5 February 1990 by Atlantic Records and Blanco y Negro Records.

The Language of Life became Everything but the Girl's second album to surpass sales of 500,000 copies, but the album divided the group's British fanbase. In 2012, group member Tracey Thorn described The Language of Life as "a slightly slick, kind of semi-jazzy, sophisticated record" and recalled that it "was a definite attempt to try and do something that had a character to it, but in retrospect when we were asked why we had taken that direction, we couldn't entirely say why".

== Background ==
Producer Tommy LiPuma had previously worked with artists like Miles Davis, Horace Silver, Randy Newman, and George Benson, and had contributed production to Aztec Camera's 1987 album Love. He had expressed an interest in producing Everything but the Girl, and Tracey Thorn and Ben Watt, feeling that they had lost their place within the UK music scene, contacted him and asked him if he wanted to hear some demos. He invited them to New York City, and then to Los Angeles, where they would eventually record The Language of Life.

Tracey Thorn performed lead vocals on the album, and Ben Watt played guitar and piano, as well as doing some singing. Song arrangements were written by Larry Williams and Jerry Hey. The band LiPuma put together included Omar Hakim on drums, John Patitucci on bass and Larry Williams on keyboards. LiPuma produced, in Thorn's words, "a fully realised, immaculately performed and produced modern American soul-pop record".

The cover shot was by Nick Knight.

== Track listing ==
The Language of Life (1990 release)
No.	Title	Writer(s)	Length
1.	"Driving"	Ben Watt	3:57
2.	"Get Back Together"	Watt	3:55
3.	"Meet Me in the Morning"	Watt; Tracey Thorn	3:49
4.	"Me and Bobby D"	Watt; Thorn	4:09
5.	"The Language of Life"	Watt; Thorn	4:01
6.	"Take Me"	Cecil Womack; Linda Womack	4:08
7.	"Imagining America"	Watt	4:58
8.	"Letting Love Go"	Watt	4:45
9.	"My Baby Don't Love Me"	Watt	3:40
10.	"The Road"	Watt	3:46
Total length:			41:25

The Language of Life (2013 Edsel reissue - CD1)
No.	Title	Writer(s)	Length
1.	"Driving"	Watt	3:57
2.	"Get Back Together"	Watt	3:55
3.	"Meet Me in the Morning"	Watt; Thorn	3:49
4.	"Me and Bobby D"	Watt; Thorn	4:09
5.	"The Language of Life"	Watt; Thorn	4:01
6.	"Take Me"	C. Womack; L. Womack	4:08
7.	"Imagining America"	Watt	4:58
8.	"Letting Love Go"	Watt	4:45
9.	"My Baby Don't Love Me"	Watt	3:40
10.	"The Road"	Watt	3:46
11.	"Driving" (Masters at Work Racing Mix)	Watt	5:42
12.	"Driving" (Underdog Vocal Remix)	Watt	3:15
13.	"Take Me" (Clifton Mix)	C. Womack; L. Womack	5:05
14.	"Take Me" (Clifton Mix instrumental)	C. Womack; L. Womack	4:47
15.	"Take Me" (Lee Hamblin Remix)	C. Womack; L. Womack	6:21
16.	"Take Me" (Lee Hamblin Love Mix)	C. Womack; L. Womack	4:41

The Language of Life (2013 Edsel reissue - CD2)
No.	Title	Writer(s)	Length
1.	"Downtown Train"	Tom Waits	3:08
2.	"Driving" (acoustic)	Watt	2:27
3.	"Imagining America" (home demo)	Watt	4:12
4.	"Driving" (home demo)	Watt	3:38
5.	"The Road" (New York live demo)	Watt	3:48
6.	"Meet Me in the Morning" (New York live demo)	Watt; Thorn	3:41
7.	"Will the Roof Fall In?" (home demo)	Watt	4:46
8.	"Meet Me in the Morning" (live)	Watt; Thorn	3:59
9.	"The Road" (live)	Watt	4:09
10.	"Driving" (live)	Watt	4:26
11.	"Me and Bobby D" (live)	Watt; Thorn	4:44
12.	"Imagining America" (live)	Watt	6:12
13.	"The Language of Life" (live)	Watt; Thorn	5:40
14.	"Letting Love Go" (Michael Brecker final solo and alternatives)	Watt	1:46
15.	"Driving" (Michael Brecker final main solo and alternatives, rough mixes)	Watt	1:58
16.	"Driving" (Michael Brecker final outro solo and alternative, rough mixes)	Watt	2:33
17.	"The Road" (Stan Getz alternate whole take, rough mixes)	Watt	3:51
Total length:			1:30:13

== Personnel ==
Everything but the Girl

- Tracey Thorn – vocals
- Ben Watt – guitar, piano, vocals

Additional musicians

- John Patitucci – bass
- Jerry Hey – flugelhorn (tracks 3, 10), horn arrangements
- Larry Williams – piano, synthesisers
- Kirk Whalum – tenor saxophone (tracks 4, 6, 7)
- Russell Ferrante – piano (tracks 3, 6)
- Lenny Castro – percussion
- Michael Landau – guitar (tracks 2, 4, 6–9)
- Omar Hakim – drums
- Vinnie Colaiuta – drums (track 7)
- Stan Getz – tenor saxophone (track 10)
- Joe Sample – piano (track 5)
- Michael Brecker – tenor saxophone (tracks 1, 8)
- Marc Russo – alto saxophone

Technical

- Al Schmitt – engineering
- Bill Schnee – mixing
- Nick Knight – photography

Additionally, Rod Temperton, James McMillan, Geoff Travis, Damon Butcher, Steve Pearce, Cecil and Linda Womack and Archie Williams are thanked in the liner notes.

== Charts ==
Chart (1990)	Peak position
Australian Albums (ARIA)	90
Dutch Albums (Album Top 100)	61
New Zealand Albums (RMNZ)	19
UK Albums (OCC)	10
US Billboard 200	77

== Certifications ==
Region	Certification	Certified units/sales
United Kingdom (BPI)	Gold	100,000^{^}
^{^} Shipments figures based on certification alone.
