= Idlewild (Everything but the Girl album) =

Studio album by Everything but the Girl
- Released: 29 February 1988
- Recorded: Autumn 1987
- Studios: Livingston Recording Studios, London
- Genre: Sophisti-pop
- Length: 45:17
- Labels: Blanco y Negro; Sire
- Producer: Ben Watt

Everything but the Girl chronology
Baby, the Stars Shine Bright (1986)	Idlewild (1988)	The Language of Life (1990)

Singles from Idlewild
- 1. "These Early Days" Released: 1988; 2. "I Always Was Your Girl" Released: 1988; 3. "I Don't Want to Talk About It" Released: August 1988; 4. "Love Is Here Where I Live" Released: 1988

Idlewild is the fourth studio album by British musical duo Everything but the Girl. It was released on 29 February 1988 by Blanco y Negro Records and Sire Records.

The album was reissued in 2012 as a remastered two-disc deluxe set by Edsel Records.

== Recording and release ==
Songs on Idlewild deal with domestic, daily and family topics, such as motherhood and child raising ("Apron Strings," "These Early Days"), growing up in the suburbs ("Oxford Street") and relationships ("I Always Was Your Girl", "Love Is Here Where I Live") or homesickness ("Lonesome for a Place I Know"). Its sounds flow between acoustic instrumentation, synths and drum machine. It was produced and recorded by the duo with little input from other collaborators. According to singer Tracey Thorn, at the time the album was finished, the record company considered it lacking of hits and doubted its quality, but it later received critical acclaim.

In her autobiography Bedsit Disco Queen Thorn recalls from the recording process:

I am writing songs, though; lyrics that are more like short stories than pop lyrics. Perhaps they ought to be short stories. They don’t really have choruses. Maybe I’m just not very good at choruses. Ben is experimenting with synths and keyboards. He buys a drum machine and starts getting into the finer details of how to programme it. I don’t know how to operate the drum machine, or how to turn the synths on, and I’m not bothered enough to learn. There is some disagreement about what our next record should sound like. We keep changing our minds. I still write all my songs on a guitar or at the piano, and so when I play them they sound a bit like my songs have always sounded. But Ben is writing songs with a more modern sound, using his new synths and the drum machine, and I like these too. We veer between these two possible extremes before making a record, Idlewild, which incorporates a bit of both. Maybe it’s another ‘bizarre hybrid’.

== Critical and commercial reception ==
Professional ratings
Review scores
Source	Rating
AllMusic	4.5/5 stars
Mojo	4/5 stars
NME	8/10
Pitchfork	6.4/10
Q	4/5 stars
Record Mirror	4/5
The Rolling Stone Album Guide	3/5 stars
Smash Hits	7 1/2/10
Spin Alternative Record Guide	8/10
Uncut	6/10

Idlewild was met with critical acclaim and remains a fan-favourite. It was included in the book 1001 Albums You Must Hear Before You Die.

Three songs were released as singles but failed to make a big impact. "These Early Days" peaked at No. 75 and "I Always Was Your Girl" at No. 87 in the UK, while "Love Is Here Where I Live" didn't chart. In between these releases, EBTG recorded a cover of "I Don't Want to Talk About It" which became their biggest success to that point (UK No. 3) and was later included on Idlewild's re-releases.

The album reached No. 13 in the UK and No. 38 in New Zealand and received a Gold certification for sales in excess of 100,000 copies in the United Kingdom.

== Track listing ==
Idlewild (1988 original release)
No.	Title	Writer(s)	Length
1.	"Love Is Here Where I Live"	Tracey Thorn; Ben Watt	3:55
2.	"These Early Days"	Thorn	3:50
3.	"I Always Was Your Girl"	Thorn; Watt	4:00
4.	"Oxford Street"	Thorn	3:21
5.	"The Night I Heard Caruso Sing"	Watt	2:55
6.	"Goodbye Sunday"	Thorn; Watt	4:00
7.	"Shadow on a Harvest Moon"	Thorn	3:38
8.	"Blue Moon Rose"	Thorn; Watt	3:37
9.	"Tears All Over Town"	Watt	4:35
10.	"Lonesome for a Place I Know"	Thorn; Watt	4:02
11.	"Apron Strings"	Thorn; Watt	3:07
Total length:			41:02

Idlewild (1988 re-release)
No.	Title	Writer(s)	Length
1.	"I Don't Want to Talk About It"	Danny Whitten	4:17
2.	"Love Is Here Where I Live"	Tracey Thorn; Ben Watt	3:55
3.	"These Early Days"	Thorn	3:50
4.	"I Always Was Your Girl"	Thorn; Watt	4:00
5.	"Oxford Street"	Thorn	3:21
6.	"The Night I Heard Caruso Sing"	Watt	2:55
7.	"Goodbye Sunday"	Thorn; Watt	4:00
8.	"Shadow on a Harvest Moon"	Thorn	3:38
9.	"Blue Moon Rose"	Thorn; Watt	3:37
10.	"Tears All Over Town"	Watt	4:35
11.	"Lonesome for a Place I Know"	Thorn; Watt	4:02
12.	"Apron Strings"	Thorn; Watt	3:07
Total length:			45:22

Idlewild (2012 Edsel re-release - CD 1)
No.	Title	Writer(s)	Length
1.	"Love Is Here Where I Live"	Thorn; Watt	3:55
2.	"These Early Days"	Thorn	3:50
3.	"I Always Was Your Girl"	Thorn; Watt	4:00
4.	"Oxford Street"	Thorn	3:21
5.	"The Night I Heard Caruso Sing"	Watt	2:55
6.	"Goodbye Sunday"	Thorn; Watt	4:00
7.	"Shadow on a Harvest Moon"	Thorn	3:38
8.	"Blue Moon Rose"	Thorn; Watt	3:37
9.	"Tears All Over Town"	Watt	4:35
10.	"Lonesome for a Place I Know"	Thorn; Watt	4:02
11.	"Apron Strings"	Thorn; Watt	3:07
Total length:			41:02

Idlewild (2012 Edsel re-release - CD 2)
No.	Title	Writer(s)	Length
1.	"Dyed in the Grain"	Watt	5:07
2.	"No Place Like Home"	Paul Overstreet	4:26
3.	"Another Day, Another Dollar"	Thorn	3:28
4.	"Hang Out the Flags"	Thorn; Watt	3:21
5.	"Home from Home"	Thorn	3:06
6.	"I Don't Want to Talk About It"	Whitten	4:17
7.	"I Don't Want to Talk About It" (instrumental)	Whitten	3:01
8.	"Living on Honeycomb"	Thorn	2:32
9.	"How About Me?"	Irving Berlin	2:46
10.	"These Early Days" (Dave Bascombe remix)	Thorn	3:28
11.	"Love Is Here Where I Live" (home demo, 1987)	Thorn; Watt	3:38
12.	"I Always Was Your Girl" (home demo, 1987)	Thorn; Watt	3:22
13.	"Tears All Over Town" (home demo, 1987)	Watt	3:28
14.	"Apron Strings" (home demo, 1987)	Thorn; Watt	3:10
15.	"Oxford Street" (home demo, 1987)	Thorn	3:32
16.	"Lonesome for a Place I Know" (home demo, 1987)	Thorn; Watt	3:00
17.	"Always Remember (These Early Days)" (home demo, 1987)	Thorn	3:23
18.	"Apron Strings" (alternative film version, 1987)	Thorn; Watt	3:00
Total length:			1:02:04

== Personnel ==
Everything but the Girl

- Tracey Thorn – vocals
- Ben Watt – vocals, guitar

Additional musicians

- Ian Fraser – tenor saxophone
- Steve Pearce – bass
- Damon Butcher – piano, synthesizer
- James McMillan – trumpet
- Chucho Merchán – bass on "Lonesome for a Place I Know"
- Peter King – alto saxophone

Technical

- Jerry Boys – engineering

Additionally, Geoff Travis, Lindy Morrison and James McMillan are thanked in the liner notes.

== Charts ==
Chart (1988)	Peak position
New Zealand Albums (RMNZ)	38
UK Albums (Official Charts)	13

== Certifications ==
Region	Certification	Certified units/sales
United Kingdom (BPI)	Gold	100,000^{^}
^{^} Shipments figures based on certification alone.
