= Everything but the Girl (album) =

Compilation album by Everything but the Girl
- Released: 1984
- Genre: Alternative rock; indie pop; jangle pop
- Length: 34:29
- Label: Sire
- Producer: Robin Millar

Everything but the Girl chronology
Eden (1984)	Everything but the Girl (1984)	Love Not Money (1985)

Professional ratings
Review scores
Source	Rating
AllMusic	3/5 stars
The Rolling Stone Album Guide	3.5/5 stars
Spin Alternative Record Guide	7/10

Everything but the Girl is a compilation album by British musical duo Everything but the Girl. It was released in 1984 in the US and Canada by Sire Records, serving as the band's debut album in those countries. It contains six tracks from their United Kingdom debut Eden, two UK singles and four B-sides.

== Background and release ==
Everything but the Girl was only released in the United States, Canada, and a few other countries, such as Brazil. It consists of six tracks from Eden plus B-sides and non-album UK singles. In the several months gap between recording and releasing Eden, Thorn and Watt opened themselves to new influences, mostly the Smiths, with whom they also became close. This influence can be heard in "Never Could Have Been Worse" (released as a B-side to "Each and Every One" in the UK).

Other new songs include "Mine", which was released as a single in the UK (where it reached No. 58) only four weeks after Eden, and marked a departure from the album's themes and sound, with Thorn singing about a single mother and gender politics involved in surnames. The other single "Native Land", which featured the Smiths's Johnny Marr on harmonica, only reached No. 73. The album completes its track listing with "Easy as Sin", "Riverbed Dry" (B-sides to "Mine" and "Native Land"), "Never Could Have Been Worse" and "Laugh You Out the Hose" (B-sides to "Each and Every One").

== Track listing ==
No.	Title	Writer(s)	Original release	Length
1.	"Each and Every One"	Tracey Thorn; Ben Watt	Eden	2:46
2.	"Tender Blue"	Watt	Eden	3:04
3.	"Another Bridge"	Thorn; Watt	Eden	2:12
4.	"Frost and Fire"	Thorn; Watt	Eden	3:02
5.	"Fascination"	Thorn	Eden	3:19
6.	"Crabwalk" (Instrumental)	Watt	Eden	3:24
7.	"Never Could Have Been Worse"	Watt	"Each and Every One" B-side	2:43
8.	"Laugh You Out the House"	Thorn	"Each and Every One" B-side	1:46
9.	"Mine"	Thorn	Stand-alone single	3:18
10.	"Easy as Sin"	Watt	"Mine" B-side	2:56
11.	"Native Land"	Thorn; Watt	Stand-alone single	3:06
12.	"Riverbed Dry"	Thorn; Watt	"Native Land" B-side	2:53
Total length:				34:29

== Personnel ==
Everything but the Girl

- Tracey Thorn – acoustic guitar, vocals
- Ben Watt – guitar, piano, Hammond organ, vocals

Additional musicians

- Bosco DeOliveira – percussion
- Dick Pearce – flugelhorn, trumpet
- Nigel Nash – tenor saxophone
- Peter King – alto saxophone
- Charles Hayward – drums
- Chucho Merchán – double bass
- Simon Booth – guitar
- Bill Le Sage – vibraphone
- Johnny Marr – harmonica on "Native Land"
- Phil Moxham – bass
- Dave Smith – double bass
- Bob Sydor – tenor saxophone
- June Miles-Kingston – drums, vocals
