= Worldwide (Everything but the Girl album) =

Studio album by Everything but the Girl
- Released: 23 September 1991
- Recorded: Livingston Recording Studios, London
- Genre: Pop-soul
- Length: 44:01
- Label: Blanco y Negro
- Producer: Everything but the Girl

Everything but the Girl chronology
The Language of Life (1990)	Worldwide (1991)	Acoustic (1992)

Professional ratings
Review scores
Source	Rating
AllMusic	3/5 stars
Entertainment Weekly	B
NME	5/10
The Rolling Stone Album Guide	3.5/5 stars
Spin Alternative Record Guide	4/10

Worldwide is the sixth studio album by Everything but the Girl, released on 23 September 1991.

"Old Friends", "Twin Cities" and "Talk to Me Like the Sea" were released as singles but didn't impact the charts. The album itself debuted at its peak at No. 29 in the UK but quickly dropped the chart. Thus, it became the least successful Everything but the Girl release, both critically and commercially.

In 2012, Edsel Records reissued Worldwide as a two-disc set which gathered other EPs released around the time (1992's Covers and 1993's The Only Living Boy in New York and I Didn't Know I Was Looking for Love) plus b-sides, demos and live recordings from 1990-1994.

== Track listing ==
Worldwide (1991 original release)
No.	Title	Writer(s)	Length
1.	"Old Friends"	Ben Watt	3:45
2.	"Understanding"	Tracey Thorn; Watt	4:11
3.	"You Lift Me Up"	Thorn	4:13
4.	"Talk to Me Like the Sea"	Watt	4:30
5.	"British Summertime"	Thorn; Watt	3:46
6.	"Twin Cities"	Watt	4:35
7.	"Frozen River"	Watt	3:48
8.	"One Place"	Thorn	4:58
9.	"Politics Aside"	Watt	3:24
10.	"Boxing and Pop Music"	Watt	5:57
11.	"Feel Alright"	Watt	0:54
Total length:			47:48

Worldwide (1992 Germany reissue)
No.	Title	Writer(s)	Length
1.	"Old Friends"	Ben Watt	3:45
2.	"Understanding"	Tracey Thorn; Watt	4:11
3.	"You Lift Me Up"	Thorn	4:13
4.	"Talk to Me Like the Sea"	Watt	4:30
5.	"British Summertime"	Thorn; Watt	3:46
6.	"Love is Strange"	Ethel Smith, Sylvia Robinson, Mickey Baker	3:21
7.	"Twin Cities"	Watt	4:35
8.	"Frozen River"	Watt	3:48
9.	"One Place"	Thorn	4:58
10.	"Politics Aside"	Watt	3:24
11.	"Boxing and Pop Music"	Watt	5:57
12.	"Feel Alright"	Watt	0:54
Total length:			51:10

Worldwide and the Acoustic EPs (2012 reissue CD1)
No.	Title	Writer(s)	Length
1.	"Old Friends"	Ben Watt	3:47
2.	"Understanding"	Tracey Thorn; Watt	4:11
3.	"You Lift Me Up"	Thorn	4:15
4.	"Talk to Me Like the Sea"	Watt	4:29
5.	"British Summertime"	Thorn; Watt	3:48
6.	"Twin Cities"	Watt	4:36
7.	"Frozen River"	Watt	3:49
8.	"One Place"	Thorn	5:00
9.	"Politics Aside"	Watt	3:25
10.	"Boxing and Pop Music"	Watt	5:58
11.	"Feel Alright"	Watt	1:10
12.	"Twin Cities" (Wildwood Remix)	Watt	4:18
13.	"Twin Cities" (The Green Planes a Capella Mix)	Watt	4:30
14.	"Politics Aside" (Instrumental)	Watt	2:37
15.	"British Summertime" (Home demo)	Thorn; Watt	3:22
16.	"Frozen River" (Home demo)	Watt	3:29
17.	"Understanding" (Home demo)	Thorn; Watt	3:47
Total length:			1:06:32

Worldwide and the Acoustic EPs (2012 reissue CD2)
No.	Title	Writer(s)	Length
1.	"Love Is Strange"	Ethel Smith, Sylvia Robinson, Mickey Baker	3:23
2.	"Tougher Than The Rest"	Bruce Springsteen	4:13
3.	"Time After Time"	Cyndi Lauper, Rob Hyman	4:27
4.	"Allison"	Elvis Costello	3:06
5.	"The Only Living Boy in New York"	Paul Simon	4:13
6.	"Gabriel"	Thorn; Watt	2:32
7.	"Birds"	Neil Young	2:23
8.	"Horses in the Room"	Watt	2:59
9.	"I Didn't Know I Was Looking for Love"	Thorn; Watt	4:19
10.	"My Head is My Only House Unless It Rains"	Don Van Vliet	2:58
11.	"Political Science"	Randy Newman	2:15
12.	"A Piece of my Mind"	Thorn	3:30
13.	"I Didn't Know I Was Looking for Love" (Home demo)	Thorn; Watt	3:43
14.	"Thirteen" (Unreleased studio demo)	Alex Chilton; Chris Bell	2:41
15.	"Kotton Krown" (Live in Toronto, Bathurst Street Theater, 1994)	Kim Gordon; Lee Ranaldo; Steve Shelley; Thurston Moore	2:33
16.	"Talk to Me Like the Sea" (Live in Toronto, Bathurst Street Theater, 1994)	Watt	4:09
17.	"Will You Still Love Me Tomorrow?" (Live in Queen's Theatre, London, 1992)	Gerry Goffin; Carole King	3:49
18.	"Let It Be Me" (Live in Hammersmith Odeon, 1990)	Gilbert Bécaud, Manny Curtis, Pierre Delanoë	2:42
19.	"Apron Strings" (Live in Minneapolis & St Paul World Theatre, 1990)	Thorn; Watt	2:49
20.	"Back to the Old House" (Live in Hammersmith Odeon, 1990)	Johnny Marr; Morrissey	3:49
21.	"Fascination" (Live in Manchester)	Thorn	4:10
Total length:			1:09:50

== Personnel ==
Everything but the Girl

- Tracey Thorn – vocals
- Ben Watt – synthesizer, guitar, synthesizer bass, piano, organ, drum and sound programming, background vocals

with:

- Ralph Salmins – drums, cymbals
- James McMillan – flugelhorn, trumpet
- Ralph Salmins – percussion
- Geoff Gascoyne – bass
- Damon Butcher – piano
- Martin Ditcham – percussion
- Greg Lester – guitar
- Dick Oatts – alto & soprano saxophone
- Peter Murray – organ
- Steve Pearce – bass
- Pete Whyman – tenor saxophone
- Vinnie Colaiuta – drums

Technical

- Jerry Boys – engineer
- Richard Haughton – cover photography

== Charts ==
Chart performance for Worldwide
Chart (1991)	Peak position
Australia (ARIA)	164
United Kingdom (OCC)	29
