= Love Not Money =

Studio album by Everything but the Girl
- Released: 15 April 1985
- Recorded: Power Plant (London)
- Genres: Indie pop; jangle pop
- Length: 35:48
- Labels: Blanco y Negro; Sire
- Producer: Robin Millar

Everything but the Girl chronology
Everything but the Girl (1984)	Love Not Money (1985)	Baby, the Stars Shine Bright (1986)

Singles from Love Not Money
- 1. "When All's Well" Released: 1985; 2. "Angel" Released: 1985

Love Not Money is the second studio album by British band Everything but the Girl, which consisted of Tracey Thorn and Ben Watt. It was produced by Robin Millar, recorded at Powerplant Studios in London and was released in the UK on 15 April 1985 by Blanco y Negro Records. It spent nine weeks on the UK Albums Chart, peaking at number 10. In the United States, Sire Records issued the album with two additional tracks.

Love Not Money is Everything but the Girl’s "most overtly politicised" album. Besides Thorn and Watt, notable performers on the album include June Miles-Kingston, Phil Moxham, Neil Scott and B.J. Cole. The tracks "When All's Well" and "Angel" were released as singles in the UK. Love Not Money was reissued in 2012 as a remastered two-disc deluxe set by Edsel Records.

== Themes ==
The band's Tracey Thorn told CMJ New Music Monthly her partner and bandmate Ben Watt had been buying guitars and wanted to make an electric-guitar-based album. Love Not Money's songs cover subjects such as social stratification, sexism, and the sectarian conflict and terrorism in Northern Ireland. "Ugly Little Dreams" is dedicated to American actor Frances Farmer. Thorn said, "It's our most overtly politicised set of lyrics—some good, some a bit crass". In a 2012 interview with The Guardian, Watt said if given a chance to redo the album, he'd remove the song "Sean," calling it politicised and "just a bit ham-fisted."

== Chart performance ==
Love Not Money spent nine weeks on the UK Albums Chart. It debuted and peaked at number 10 on 27 April 1985 and slowly declined, falling to number 69 on 22 June, its final week on the chart.

=== Singles ===
In the UK, two tracks from Love Not Money were released as singles. "When All's Well" entered the UK Singles Chart on 23 March 1985 at number 88; it peaked at number 77 the following week, its last week on the chart. "Angel" charted on 8 June 1985 at number 97 and peaked at number 93 the following week then left the chart.

== Critical reception ==
Professional ratings
Review scores
Source	Rating
AllMusic	3/5 stars
Pitchfork	5.8/10
Q	4/5 stars
Record Mirror	3/5
The Rolling Stone Album Guide	4/5 stars
Sounds	2/5 stars
Spin Alternative Record Guide	5/10
Uncut	7/10

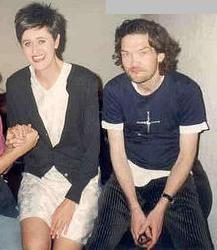
Ben Watt and Tracey Thorn as photographed in the 1990s.

Reviewing the 2012 reissue, Jess Harvell of Pitchfork called Love Not Money "a near-total reinvention [of Everything but the Girl] and a complete stylistic mish-mash". She said its guitars are covered with "about nine pounds of agreeably dated glitz" and compared their sound with that of Icicle Works' music. Harvell also said, "it's the most soporific and studiously 'serious' album EBTG ever made, and parts of it are a real drag"; that the title track "Love Not Money" "plays the dreaminess of 80s soft-focus indie against the stark [political] reality that so much 80s pop was rushing to avoid"; and called "Sean" and its tin flute instrumentation "Celtic kitsch" that is "so ham-fisted you'll cringe".

Also reviewing the reissue, the BBC's Ian Wade compared the album with the music of Lloyd Cole and the Commotions and The Smiths, and wrote that "it sounded a desire for EBTG to be heard above the bigger crowds [Everything but the Girl] were beginning to play to".

In 2015, Emily Barker of NME rated Love Not Money in 16th place on her list of "50 Albums Released In 1985 That Still Sound Great Today", saying it "confirmed the duo as one of our nation's little treasures ..."

== Track listing ==
Original UK release
No.	Title	Writer(s)	Length
1.	"When All's Well"	Ben Watt	3:03
2.	"Ugly Little Dreams"	Tracey Thorn	2:54
3.	"Shoot Me Down"	Thorn; Watt	4:13
4.	"Are You Trying to Be Funny?"	Thorn; Watt	3:18
5.	"Sean"	Watt	3:32
6.	"Ballad of the Times"	Watt	3:29
7.	"Anytown"	Watt	3:27
8.	"This Love (Not for Sale)"	Thorn; Watt	3:07
9.	"Trouble and Strife"	Thorn; Watt	3:08
10.	"Angel"	Thorn; Watt	5:37

Original US release
No.	Title	Writer(s)	Length
1.	"When All's Well"	Watt	3:03
2.	"Heaven Help Me"	Thorn; Watt	3:20
3.	"Are You Trying to Be Funny?"	Thorn; Watt	3:18
4.	"Ugly Little Dreams"	Thorn	2:54
5.	"Shoot Me Down"	Thorn; Watt	4:13
6.	"Sean"	Watt	3:32
7.	"Ballad of the Times"	Watt	3:29
8.	"Kid"	Chrissie Hynde	3:46
9.	"Anytown"	Watt	3:27
10.	"This Love (Not for Sale)"	Thorn; Watt	3:07
11.	"Trouble and Strife"	Thorn; Watt	3:08
12.	"Angel"	Thorn; Watt	5:37

=== 2012 Edsel Records reissue ===
Disc 1
No.	Title	Writer(s)	Length
1.	"When All's Well"	Watt	3:03
2.	"Ugly Little Dreams"	Thorn	2:54
3.	"Shoot Me Down"	Thorn; Watt	4:13
4.	"Are You Trying to Be Funny?"	Thorn; Watt	3:18
5.	"Sean"	Watt	3:32
6.	"Ballad of the Times"	Watt	3:29
7.	"Anytown"	Watt	3:27
8.	"This Love (Not for Sale)"	Thorn; Watt	3:07
9.	"Trouble and Strife"	Thorn; Watt	3:08
10.	"Angel"	Thorn; Watt	5:37

Disc 2
No.	Title	Writer(s)	Length
1.	"Heaven Help Me"	Thorn; Watt	3:24
2.	"Kid"	Hynde	3:50
3.	"Pigeons in the Attic Room"	Thorn; Watt	1:45
4.	"Charmless Callous Ways"	Thorn; Watt	1:55
5.	"Easy as Sin" (Version)	Watt	4:16
6.	"Angel" (home demo, 1984)	Thorn; Watt	5:11
7.	"Ugly Little Dreams" (home demo, 1984)	Thorn	2:52
8.	"Are You Trying to Be Funny?" (home demo, 1984)	Thorn; Watt	3:07
9.	"This Love (Not for Sale)" (BBC session recording, 1984–85)	Thorn; Watt	2:50
10.	"Ballad of the Times" (BBC session recording, 1984–85)	Watt	2:47
11.	"Are You Trying to Be Funny?" (BBC session recording, 1984–85)	Thorn; Watt	3:15

== Personnel ==
Everything but the Girl

- Tracey Thorn – vocals
- Ben Watt – electric and acoustic guitars, piano, organ, vocals

Additional musicians

- June Miles-Kingston – drums, backing vocals
- Philip Moxham – bass
- Neil Scott – electric guitar
- Dick Pearce – trumpet
- Nigel Nash – tenor saxophone
- B.J. Cole – pedal steel
- Dick Pearce – flugelhorn, trumpet
- Peter King – alto saxophone
- Chris Thompson – banjo
- Dave Golding – tin whistle
- Robin Millar – piano on "Angel"

Technical

- Ben Rogan, Mike Pela – engineering
- Caryn Gough – cover design
- Humphrey Spender – cover photography, taken from Worktown People: Photographs from Northern England 1937–38
- Richard Haughton and Jean-Louis Gregoire – inner bag photography

Thanked

- Dave Haslam, Geoff Travis and Sid Parker.

== Charts ==
Chart (1985)	Peak position
German Albums (Offizielle Top 100)	51
Dutch Albums (Album Top 100)	26
New Zealand Albums (RMNZ)	38
UK Albums (Official Charts)	10

== Certifications ==
Region	Certification	Certified units/sales
United Kingdom (BPI)	Gold	100,000^{^}
^{^} Shipments figures based on certification alone.
