= Robin Millar (producer) =

English musical artist and producer

Sir Robin Millar CBE
- Born: Robin John Christian Millar; 18 December 1951 (age 74)
- Origin: Tottenham, London, England
- Genres: Pop, R&B, rock, Latin, indie, punk, jazz, film music
- Occupations: Record producer, arranger, composer, musician, academic, c-suite advisor, mentor, non-executive director, public speaker, philanthropist
- Instruments: Keyboard, guitar, bass guitar, percussion, drums
- Years active: 1975–present

Sir Robin John Christian Millar CBE (born 18 December 1951) is an English record producer, musician and businessman, known variously as 'The Original Smooth Operator', 'The man behind Sade', and 'Golden Ears' by Boy George. He was born in London to an Irish father and a West Indian mother, and is blind. He is one of the world's most successful record producers with over 160 gold, silver and platinum discs and 55 million record sales to his credit. His 1984 production of Diamond Life, the debut album by Sade, was named one of the best ten albums of the last 30 years at the 2011 Brit Awards.

He has developed and run a string of businesses in car hire, music recording, artist management and publishing. He was music supervisor for the opening ceremony of the 1996 Atlanta Olympic Games.

He has worked as a fundraiser for vulnerable people for 40 years and in 2012 underwent a 12-hour operation to install a bionic retina in his right eye to help research into future treatment for blindness.

He was appointed Commander of the Order of the British Empire (CBE) in the 2010 Birthday Honours and knighted in the 2023 New Year Honours for services to music, people with disabilities, young people and charity.

In September 2020 he was appointed Chair of Scope UK, the national charity representing 16 million UK disabled people. In February 2021 he rode 407 virtual miles on an exercise bike to raise £40,000 for Scope, whose shops were closed down in the pandemic. He finished his final term as Chair in August 2026.

== Early life ==
Millar was born with retinitis pigmentosa at St George's Hospital, which is now The Lanesborough Hotel, Hyde Park Corner. Despite poor vision he attended mainstream state school Enfield Grammar School from 1963 to 1970 and then read law at Queens' College, Cambridge from 1970 to 1973. Millar's older sister Rose was the first wife of The Rolling Stones guitarist Mick Taylor, and Millar sometimes accompanied his sister and brother-in-law on tours as a teenager.

== Musical career ==
After gaining his law degree, Millar moved into the music industry initially recording a solo album Cat's Eyes in 1974 with Mick Taylor of The Rolling Stones acting as Producer. The album was recorded at The Beatles Apple Studios (Apple Corps) 3 Saville Row, London and featured Nicky Hopkins, Bobby Keyes and Billy Preston, along with Gordon Raitt and Jamie Lane and engineer Andy Johns, but remained unreleased until issued by Apcor Records in 2019. During this period Millar trained as an apprentice audio engineer at the Chateau studios near Paris and studied music arranging at the Sorbonne. Later, in 1978, he featured as a guitarist and artist in a band called The Blue Max alongside Danny Peyronel with Charisma Records, eventually putting out records with Atlantic and WEA and working with ex-Velvet Underground singer Nico. He also played guitar with French rock band Extraballe and produced the group’s first and third albums. After working with post punk band Weekend as a record producer in 1982, he purchased Morgan Studios studio 1 and studio 2 to found Power Plant Studios in 1984. Millar also at one time owned Whitfield Street Studios (previously owned by CBS Records and Sony Music). Millar's breakthrough came in 1984 with seven consecutive Top 10 albums; including Eden by Everything but the Girl, Working Nights by Working Week, and multi-platinum selling Diamond Life, the debut album by the band Sade.

Production on other significant hit records in the period include Fine Young Cannibals (Fine Young Cannibals), Colin Hay (Looking for Jack), Big Country (The Seer), Patricia Kaas (Je te dis vous), Kane Gang, Bhundu Boys, Black, Tom Robinson, Malcolm McLaren and Randy Crawford amongst others. Millar arranged the music for the film, And Now... Ladies and Gentlemen... Millar's song "Rich and Poor", co-composed with Colin Vearncombe, was recorded by Randy Crawford on her 1989 album, Rich and Poor. His 2002 solo album, Kiss & Tell, was released by the Nujaz record label. Kiss & Tell featured additional guest vocalists such as Patricia Kaas, Ive Mendes, Peppercorn and Amar showcasing Millar's affinity with soul and latin styles. It included his own recording of 'The Sweetest Taboo' a song he originally produced for Sade. In 2020, Millar released his album Meditations From A Desert Island, a series of mood pieces to enhance mind and spirit, originally conceived to assist his staff at Blue Raincoat Music to manage the stress of lockdown restrictions.

Millar trained as a recording engineer, classical and jazz musician and arranger, and has trained dozens of engineers and producers, including Jim Abbiss, the producer of Arctic Monkeys and Adele.

In 2010 he produced the 12 track MP4 album "Cross Party". In 2016 he brought together MPs, professional musicians, students and the Thurrock Community Chorus for a charity recording of "You can't always get what you want" in aid of the Friends of Jo Cox MP.

Millar is a patron of The Music Producers Guild, which he helped found in 1987.

Millar was executive producer of the major worldwide series of concerts to commemorate the 50th anniversary of the death of Édith Piaf, with shows in Carnegie Hall, New York, The Royal Albert Hall London and major venues in France, Germany, Russia, Europe and the Far East.

He was the Chairman of The Blue Raincoat Chrysalis Group Ltd and Blue Raincoat Music, until its sale to US NASDAQ firm Reservoir Media in 2019. Blue Raincoat handle the careers of Cigarettes After Sex, Ezra Collective and Phoebe Bridgers.

== Charity work promoting skills and training ==
In July 2017 Millar became a founding director of the Institute for Apprenticeships and Technical Education. He remained a director until it merged with Skills England in 2025. He was a founder trustee of Creative and Cultural Skills, formerly the National Skills Academy for Creative & Cultural, from 2008 to 2016 and was instrumental in the project to build The Backstage Centre, part of High House Purfleet. Co-located with the Royal Opera House's Bob and Tamar Manoukian Production Centre, the centre hires out its Sound Stage and recording studios to professional companies whilst hosting training courses for young people in backstage skills. In 2016 Millar led a charity recording from the Centre involving MPs, the local choir and professional singers to raise funds in memory of MP Jo Cox. From 2020 to 2026 he was chair of the disability charity Scope. He has produced music events for charity including when a Patron at UNHCR and was a global ambassador for Leonard Cheshire Disability for eight years.

== Personal life ==
He was married to American painter Ellen Trillas from 1979 to 1997. They had two children. He has been with his wife Shelley for twenty five years.

Millar appeared on BBC Radio 4's Desert Island Discs on 20 March 2015.

== Production credits ==
Millar's work as a record producer includes credits on the following:

- Diamond Life - Sade
- Promise – Sade
- Eden - Everything But The Girl
- Working Nights - Working Week
- Love Not Money - Everything But The Girl
- The Bad And Lowdown World Of The Kane Gang - The Kane Gang
- Fine Young Cannibals - Fine Young Cannibals
- The Seer -Big Country
- Hope and Glory – Tom Robinson
- T.R.O.U.B.L.E. - Vic Godard
- True Jit - Bhundu Boys
- Wonderful Life, Black – Black
- Looking For Jack - Colin James Hay
- Fingers And Thumbs - Thomas Lang
- Comedy - Black
- Rich And Poor - Randy Crawford
- Black - Black
- Deeds Not Words - The Southernaires
- Nouveau Monde – Pierre Schott
- Je Te Dis Vous - Patricia Kaas
- Paris – Malcolm McLaren
- Mickey Hart's Mystery Box – Mickey Hart
- The Largest Movie House In Paris - Malcolm McLaren
- Chaque Jour Est Un Long Chemin - Elsa
- Beautiful Insane - Electrasy
- Outside - Amar
- Piano Bar - Patricia Kaas
- The Despicable Mischief Of Marek Rymaszewski - Marek Rymaszewski
- Urban World Music – Hiroshima
- House Music – MP4
- Cross Party – MP4
- Singles Collection – The Bluebells
- In T.R.O.U.B.L.E. Again – Vic Godard
- Ive Mendes – Ive Mendes
- Sound of the Style Council – The Style Council
- Magnetism - Ive Mendes
- Kaas Chante Piaf - Patricia Kaas
- Sungrooves – Mark Riva
- In The House – Dimitri from Paris
- Shev and the Brakes – Shev and the Brakes
- To Touch You – Tyrone Berkeley
- My Favourite Town – POLA

== Track listing ==
All songs written by Robin Millar

No.	Title	Length
1.	"May We"	3.30
2.	"By The Way"	4.48
3.	"Catch As Catch Can"	3.35
4.	"Hey Jo"	5.18
5.	"Remember"	5.30
6.	"The Melody Of Love"	4.58
7.	"Sail Away"	5.13
8.	"Sunday"	3.46
9.	"For My Life"	7.15
10.	"When You Died"	4.02
11.	"For My Life (Single Edit)"	5.31
Total length:		53.31

== Personnel ==
- Robin Millar - Vocals, Electric and Acoustic Guitars, Piano
- Mick Taylor - Electric Guitar, Slide Guitar
- Gordon Raitt - Bass Guitar, Acoustic Guitar "When You Died"
- Jamie Lane - Drums
- Nicky Hopkins - Piano "May We", "Catch As Catch Can", "Remember", "Sunday"
- Bobby Keyes - Saxophone "Catch As Catch Can"
- Billy Preston - Hammond Organ "Remember"

== Production ==
- Mick Taylor - Producer
- Andy Johns - Engineer
- Martyn Ford - String Arranger "The Melody Of Love", "For My Life"

== Track listing ==
All songs by Robin Millar (Music and Lyrics) and Fred Ala (Music), except where noted

No.	Title	Writer(s)	Length
1.	"Sing It Brother"		4.13
2.	"The Sweetest Taboo"	Sade Adu and Martin Ditcham	4.13
3.	"Love Has Gone"		4.48
4.	"Does Anybody"	Robin Millar, Fred Ala, Lysha Davies	3.54
5.	"Sardines"	Robin Millar, Fred Ala, Julian Cannonball Adderley	4.31
6.	"You'll Never Know"		5.19
7.	"Summer Rain"		5.24
8.	"98 Percent"		5.35
9.	"Crocodile"		4.37
10.	"Solid Man"		4.46
11.	"Pariscope"		3.21
12.	"A New Wave"		4.32
13.	"Tout Confort"	Robin Millar, Fred Ala, Christian Marsac	4.27
Total length:			59.47

== Personnel ==
- Robin Millar - Lead Vocals, Guitar, Percussion, Piano, Talking Drum, Harmonica
- Mark Smith - Bass Guitar, Hammond Organ, Programming, Autoharp
- Fred Ala - Electric Piano, Synth, Programming, Additional Guitar on "Summer Rain", Additional Percussion on "A New Wave"
- Lysha Davis - Alto Saxophone on "Tout Confort"
- Ive Mendes - Additional Vocals on "Love Has Gone" and "A New Wave"
- Patricia Kass - Additional Vocals on "Tout Confort"
- Amar - Additional Vocals on "Summer Rain"
- Peppercorn - Additional Vocals on "The Sweetest Taboo"

== Production ==
- Robin Millar - Producer, Arranger, Mixer, Brass, Vocal and String Arrangements
- Mark Smith - Co-Producer
- Fred Ala - Co-Producer
- Tom Coyne - Mastering at Sterling Sound, New York

== Track listing ==
All music by Robin Millar

No.	Title	Length
1.	"Birdsong"	19.14
2.	"Conga"	19.52
3.	"Miles"	21.06
4.	"Piano"	19.04
5.	"Bossa"	20.40
6.	"Night Becomes Day"	20.37
7.	"Turtle Watch"	20.07
8.	"Shadows"	21.06
Total length:		120.41

== Personnel ==
- Robin Millar - All instruments

== Production ==
- Robin Millar - Producer, Arranger, Mixer
