= The Only Living Boy in New York =

Single by Simon and Garfunkel

from the album Bridge over Troubled Water
- A-side: "Cecilia"
- Released: January 26, 1970
- Recorded: November 1969
- Genre: Folk rock; psychedelic
- Length: 3:59
- Label: Columbia
- Songwriter: Paul Simon
- Producers: Paul Simon; Art Garfunkel; Roy Halee

"The Only Living Boy in New York" is a song written by Paul Simon and performed by Simon & Garfunkel. It is the eighth track from the duo's fifth and final studio album, Bridge over Troubled Water. The song was also issued as the B-side of the duo's "Cecilia" single.

== Background ==
Paul Simon wrote the song as a thinly veiled message to Art Garfunkel, referencing in the first stanza the time when Garfunkel went to Mexico to act in the film Catch-22. Simon was left alone in New York writing songs for Bridge over Troubled Water; hence the feeling of great loneliness expressed in "The Only Living Boy in New York". Simon refers to Garfunkel in the song as "Tom", alluding to their early days when they were called Tom and Jerry, and encourages him to "let your honesty shine... like it shines on me". The background vocals feature both Garfunkel and Simon recorded together in an echo chamber, multi-tracked around eight times.

== Personnel ==
- Paul Simon – lead vocals, background vocals, acoustic guitar
- Art Garfunkel – backup and harmony vocals
- Joe Osborn – bass guitar
- Larry Knechtel – Hammond organ
- Fred Carter Jr. – acoustic guitar
- Hal Blaine – drums, triangle

== Covers ==
- The 1973 reggae hit "Weather Report", by the Tennors, was adapted from this song.
- This song was covered by the Coolies on their 1986 album dig..?, along with eight other tongue-in-cheek covers of Simon & Garfunkel classics.
- In 1992, British indie band Carter the Unstoppable Sex Machine parodied the title of the song in that of their biggest-selling single, "The Only Living Boy In New Cross", which was included on their album 1992 – The Love Album. (New Cross is an area of south-east London.)
- English musical duo Everything but the Girl recorded a cover of the song for their greatest hits album Home Movies. It was released as a single on April 12, 1993, and spent five weeks on the UK Singles Chart, peaking at number 42.
- Black 47 frontman Larry Kirwan covered the song on his 2001 solo project Kilroy Was Here.
- Marc Cohn released a cover version as part of his 2010 album of tribute songs, Listening Booth: 1970.
- Passenger, the Once and Stu Larsen covered the song as part of their American Tour series.
- Kishi Bashi covered the song as one of two singles released on July 12, 2017, exclusively on Spotify, both songs having been recorded in the company's New York City studios in early April of the same year
- Buffalo Tom released a cover version on their 2018 album Quiet and Peace, after guitarist Bill Janovitz performed a live cover of the song with his daughter, Lucy.
- David Mead covered the song on the soundtrack album for the television series Everwood in 2004.
- Racoon Racoon, a chamber folk duo from France, featuring The Duke of Norfolk, released a version as a single in February 2021 (during the COVID-19 pandemic) that begins with a haunting a cappella of part of the chorus.
- Matt Nathanson released a cover of the song on his album Lexington EP in 2023.

== Use in film ==
- Everything but the Girl's cover was featured in the 2002 film Tadpole.
- Featured as part of the soundtrack for the 2004 film Garden State.
- Used as part of the soundtrack of the 2009 film New York, I Love You.
- Used in the credits of the 2012 film Koch
- Used in the final scene of the HBO film version of Larry Kramer's The Normal Heart (2014).
- Used in the film with the same name: The Only Living Boy in New York (2017).

== Use in other media ==
- Honda has used sections of this song for their television commercials of the 2011 Accord.
- David Gallaher and Steve Ellis used the song as inspiration for their 2009 The Only Living Boy webcomic series.
- The original recording was featured during the final scenes of the 2012 second-season finale, "God's Eye", of Alphas.
- The original recording was used in the 2014 first-season finale, "Nephew", of BBC Three's comedy Uncle.
- Saturday Night Live in the May 13, 2017 episode, featured the song in a comedy sketch with Melissa McCarthy as Sean Spicer and Alec Baldwin as Donald Trump.
- Everything but the Girl's cover was featured on Designated Survivor season 2 episode 13, "Original Sin" on March 14, 2018, used in the final scene.
- This is Us season 4 episode 16 "New York New York New York" on March 10, 2020, used the song in a street scene in New York City.

== Charts ==
Chart (1970)	Peak position
Indonesia (Aktuil)	4

== Certifications ==
Region	Certification	Certified units/sales
New Zealand (RMNZ)	Gold	15,000^{‡}
United Kingdom (BPI)	Silver	200,000^{‡}
^{‡} Sales+streaming figures based on certification alone.
