= Missing (Everything but the Girl song) =

1994 single by Everything but the Girl

- Original 1994 EP cover

Single by Everything but the Girl

from the album Amplified Heart
- Released: 8 August 1994
- Length: 4:15
- Label: Blanco y Negro
- Composer: Ben Watt
- Lyricist: Tracey Thorn
- Producers: Ben Watt; Tracey Thorn; John Coxon

Everything but the Girl singles chronology
| "Rollercoaster" (1994) | "Missing" (1994) | "Missing" (Todd Terry remix) (1995) |

Music video
- "Missing" (album version) on YouTube

"Missing" (Todd Terry remix)

Single by Everything but the Girl

from the album Amplified Heart (later editions)
- Released: 23 May 1995
- Genre: Pop; deep house; dance-pop
- Length: 9:05
- Label: Blanco y Negro
- Composer: Ben Watt
- Lyricist: Tracey Thorn
- Producers: Everything but the Girl; John Coxon

Everything but the Girl singles chronology
| "Missing" (1994) | "Missing" (Todd Terry remix) (1995) | "Walking Wounded" (1996) |

Music video
- "Missing" (Todd Terry remix) on YouTube

"Missing" is a song by British musical duo Everything but the Girl from their eighth studio album, Amplified Heart (1994). It was written by the two band members, Tracey Thorn and Ben Watt, and was produced by the duo with John Coxon. It was released as the album's second single on 8 August 1994, promoted as an extended play (EP). The song initially did not achieve much success until it was remixed by Todd Terry and re-released in 1995, resulting in worldwide success, peaking at or near the top of the charts in many countries. The release of the remixed version of "Missing" gave an indication of the band's future experimentation with more electronic dance music on subsequent albums. Its music video was directed by Mark Szaszy.

Musically the song takes in multiple genres. The original version from the album is a more low-tempo influenced song, while the popular Todd Terry remix version is a more up-tempo dance-pop song. "Missing" was critically acclaimed by the majority of music critics, who praised the composition and generally considered it a highlight on the album. In 2022 and 2025, Rolling Stone and Billboard magazine included it in their lists of the greatest dance songs of all time.

== Background ==
Prior to "Missing", Everything but the Girl was known as an indie band. Their music had folk and jazz leanings. They had released eight albums prior to Amplified Heart and had a number-three UK singles chart success in 1988 ("I Don't Want to Talk About It"), but were relatively unknown in the United States.

Amplified Heart, marked a more introspective and stripped-back approach compared with Everything but the Girl’s earlier work, featuring minimalist arrangements and emotionally restrained performances. "Missing" was recorded in London between December 1993 and April 1994 as a relaxed-sounding guitar-based popular music song that had earned modest broadcasting airplay on US Adult Contemporary radio. The duo gave the track to house music producer Todd Terry to remix for nightclubs.

Tracey Thorn later explained to Rolling Stone that the song was originally intended as a dance-oriented track:

It was written with that idea in mind, totally... we put on sort of a laid back house groove instead. Then when we gave it to Todd, he took it in a really, really strong New York house direction, which had a real simplicity to it, but it was very infectious.

== Composition ==
Everything but the Girl – "Missing" (Todd Terry club mix)

According to the music sheet published at Musicnotes.com by Sony/ATV Music Publishing, "Missing" is written in the key of A minor. In vocal range, Thorn's vocals span from the key note of E4 to the key note of G5. The song is set in common time and has a beat of 128 beats per minute. Lauren Barnett from The Guardian recalled the style of music as "monochrome electronic beats." Toponehitwonders.com had said the remix "Add[s] a pulsing disco beat that sounds equally at home."

== Critical reception ==
The song was generally acclaimed by most music critics. Larry Flick from Billboard magazine wrote, "This forlorn love song is bolstered by a springy retro-pop arrangement that is brilliantly tweaked into a credible dance confection by post-producer Todd Terry. Singer Tracey Thorn's performance is a study in affecting, but restrained emotion, and the chorus instantly sticks to the brain." Steve Baltin from Cash Box noted that here, the duo "throw in everything but the sink", concluding with that "the blend is very effective, though, as the song comes off as a mix between Lisa Stansfield and Cowboy Junkies. Ethereal pop that can be danced to isn't much in demand these days, but this winner could change that if given the opportunity." Douglas Wolk from CMJ said it's "a first-rate pairing of songwriting and technology", pairing a torch song and techno-inflected backing tracks. He added that "neither the song nor the grooves are all that hot on their own, but in combination they're great—the kind of heartfelt but not histrionic dancefloor simmer that's been too rare since, say, Lisa Stansfield's heyday a few years ago."

Dave Sholin from the Gavin Report commented, "What a difference a few months and a remix can make. Miami is where 'Missing' has busted big, and where requests tell the story of how broad the appeal of the song really is. Track two, the remix edit, is the one to check out." Chuck Campbell from Knoxville News Sentinel felt it "achieves a beautifully enchanting chorus". Pan-European magazine Music & Media wrote, "Suddenly hip in the dance milieu due to Tracey Thorn's vocals on Massive Attacks 'Protection', these remixes by Todd Terry and Ultramarine a.o. will further speed it up." James Hamilton from Music Week's RM Dance Update described it as "atmospheric" and "melancholy" in his weekly dance column. Ben Turner from Muzik considered it a "miracle". John Kilgo from The Network Forty named it a "very exciting uptempo groover from this debut artist." James Hunter from Vibe remarked that Terry's remix had allowed singer Tracey Thorn "to grace stateside radios with her rare English soul", adding that her voice "is untouchable".

== Retrospective response ==
Bill Lamb from About.com said that "there has never been a more powerful expression of emotional and sexual longing in pop music than that at the core of 'Missing'." AllMusic was also very positive, highlighting the song as an album standout and rated it with 4 stars out of 5. Stopera and Galindo from BuzzFeed ranked it number 10 in their list of "The 101 Greatest Dance Songs of the '90s" in 2017, commenting, "Have you ever sat and really thought about if the desert actually misses the rain? Like any good song, it makes you think." A writer from Complex noted that the remix "set the world ablaze". Idolator ranked it among "The 50 Best Pop Singles of 1995", calling the song a "noir-ish study in wistful longing, with a hint of lonely-but-relatable stalker in the lyric."

== Chart performance ==
The resulting Todd Terry remixed dance version of "Missing" became a worldwide success, matching Everything But the Girl's best UK chart score of number three in November 1995 and scoring number one on the German singles chart. The song became the duo's first and only US Top 40 entry on the Billboard Hot 100, entering at number 94 for the week ending 12 August 1995. After a long climb, it peaked at number two during 1996 (in its 28th chart week). "Missing" eventually logged 55 weeks on the chart (a record at the time which has since been broken; the single is today the eleventh-longest charting song on the US Hot 100). "Missing" was the first ever single to spend an uninterrupted year on the US Hot 100. It also topped the US Cash Box Top 100. Even with its success in the mainstream and in nightclubs, the remix never entered the US Hot Dance Club Play chart.

In addition to its US success, "Missing" topped the Canadian RPM Top Singles, Adult Contemporary, and Dance/Urban charts. In the UK it spent over 20 weeks on the UK Singles Chart and earned the duo a double platinum certification from the British Phonographic Industry (BPI), denoting sales and streams of over 1,200,000 units. The song was also successful in Australia and New Zealand. It peaked at number two in Australia, staying on the chart for twenty-three weeks. It had similar success in New Zealand, peaking at 14 on the charts and stayed in the charts for fourteen weeks. The song also eventually peaked inside the top ten in many European countries, including Austria, Belgium (Flanders and Wallonia), France, the Netherlands, Norway, Sweden, and Switzerland. In Latin America, it became a top-10 hit in El Salvador. The single has sold three million copies worldwide.

== Music video ==
An accompanying music video was shot for the single (both the original and dance versions). It was directed by English director Mark Szaszy. The video features both Thorn and Watt in an apartment, having split up but them missing each other. It also features Thorn walking around Balham and Clapham South.

== Impact and legacy ==
In 2003, Q Magazine ranked "Missing" at number 177 in their list of the "1001 Best Songs Ever". Same year, English music journalist Paul Morley included it in his list of "Greatest Pop Single of All Time". In 2011, Fedde le Grand remixed the song and DJ Ron Slomowicz from About.com listed the track as the "Song of the Day". He said "Tracey's mournful voice fit perfectly over Todd's house beats to become a club classic and a pop hit around the world." Bill Lamb from the same publication ranked the song at top spot on his "Top 10 Best Songs of 1996". He later reviewed the remix, saying "pumps up the tempo, adds some beats but thankfully stays true to the original." Toponehitwonders.com was very positive stating "'Missing' ... is a tremendous pop song. One of the best of the 1990s. In fact, I would place it in the same company as 'You Get What You Give' by New Radicals as a nearly perfect pop song." They later complimented the chorus, catchy hook and vocal performance by Thorn.

In 2012, the song was listed at number 35 in NME's list of the "50 Best-Selling Tracks of the 90s", adding: "The 1994 version of 'Missing' had at least a foot on the dancefloor - in defiance of EBTG style - but Todd Terry gave it the final push, his deep house beats complementing Tracey Thorn's rich melancholy pine. Slowly burning, it spent five months on the UK chart and an entire year on the Billboard Hot 100. Sold: 870,000" In 2018, ThoughtCo ranked the song number one in their list of "10 Best Pop Songs of 1996". In 2022, Pitchfork featured it on their lists of "The 30 Best House Tracks of the '90s" and "The 250 Best Songs of the 1990s", while Classic Pop ranked it number nine in their list of the top 40 dance tracks from the '90s. The same year, Rolling Stone ranked "Missing" number 54 in their "200 Greatest Dance Songs of All Time". In 2025, Billboard magazine ranked it number 25 in their list of "The 100 Best Dance Songs of All Time", writing, "If Everything But the Girl were standing by the edge of the pool, mulling a swim, Todd Terry came along and shoved them in."

=== Accolades ===
| Year | Publisher | Country | Accolade | Rank |
|---|---|---|---|---|
| 1996 | BMI | United States | "BMI Pop Awards" | 1 |
| 1996 | Mixmag | United Kingdom | "The 100 Best Dance Singles of All Time" | 21 |
| 2003 | Q | United Kingdom | "1001 Best Songs Ever" | 177 |
| 2005 | Bruce Pollock | United States | "The 7,500 Most Important Songs of 1944-2000" | * |
| 2010 | Musikexpress | Germany | "Die 90er - Kritiker" | 44 |
| 2011 | MTV Dance | United Kingdom | "The 100 Biggest 90's Dance Anthems of All Time" | 8 |
| 2012 | Max | Australia | "1000 Greatest Songs of All Time" | 607 |
| 2012 | NME | United Kingdom | "50 Best-selling Tracks of the 90s" | 35 |
| 2012 | Porcys | Poland | "100 Singli 1990-1999" | 35 |
| 2013 | Complex | United States | "15 Songs That Gave Dance Music a Good Name" | * |
| 2014 | Musikexpress | Germany | "Die 700 besten Songs aller Zeiten" | 246 |
| 2015 | Idolator | United States | "The 50 Best Pop Singles of 1995" | 22 |
| 2015 | Robert Dimery | United States | "1,001 Songs You Must Hear Before You Die, and 10,001 You Must Download (2015 Update)" | * |
| 2017 | BuzzFeed | United States | "The 101 Greatest Dance Songs of the '90s" | 10 |
| 2017 | ThoughtCo | United States | "10 Best Pop Songs of 1996" | 1 |
| 2018 | ThoughtCo | United States | "The Best 100 Songs From the 1990s" | 99 |
| 2018 | Max | Australia | "1000 Greatest Songs of All Time" | 635 |
| 2018 | Stacker | United States | "Best Pop Songs of the Last 25 Years" | 40 |
| 2019 | Billboard | United States | "Billboard's Top Songs of the '90s" | 121 |
| 2020 | Tomorrowland | Belgium | "Ibiza Top 500" | 102 |
| 2021 | BuzzFeed | United States | "The 50 Best '90s Songs of Summer" | 18 |
| 2022 | Classic Pop | United Kingdom | "90s Dance – The Essential Playlist" | 9 |
| 2022 | Pitchfork | United States | "The 30 Best House Tracks of the '90s" | * |
| 2022 | Pitchfork | United States | "The 250 Best Songs of the 1990s" | 70 |
| 2022 | Rolling Stone | United States | "200 Greatest Dance Songs of All Time" | 54 |
| 2025 | Billboard | United States | "The 100 Best Dance Songs of All Time" | 25 |
| 2025 | Billboard | United States | "The 50 Best House Songs of All Time" | 39 |

(*) indicates the list is unordered.

== Track listings ==
- 12-inch maxi
1. "Missing" (Todd Terry Remix (Radio Edit)) – 4:00
2. "Missing" (Todd Terry Remix) – 4:00
3. "Missing" (Todd Terry Club Mix (US Radio Edit)) – 4:15
4. "Missing" (Todd Terry Club Mix) – 5:00
5. "Missing" (Todd Terry Extended Original Club Mix) – 9:05
6. "Missing" (Rockin' Blue Mix) – 7:47
7. "Missing" (Todd Terry Lite Mix) – 4:15
8. "Missing" (Todd Terry Tee's Beat) – 2:50
9. "Missing" (Chris & James Full on Club Mix) – 8:36
- CD maxi
1. "Missing" (Todd Terry Remix (Radio Edit)) – 3:55
2. "Missing" (Todd Terry Remix) – 4:00
3. "Missing" (Todd Terry Club Mix (US Radio Edit)) – 4:15
4. "Missing" (Todd Terry Club Mix) – 5:00
5. "Missing" (Todd Terry Extended Original Mix) – 9:05
6. "Missing" (Rockin' Blue Mix) – 7:47
7. "Missing" (Chris & James Full on Club Mix) – 8:36
8. "Missing" (Amplified Heart Album Mix) – 4:04
9. "Missing" (Todd Terry Tee's Piece) – 4:35
- CD maxi – Remixes
1. "Missing" (album version) – 4:10
2. "Missing" (Little Joey remix) – 5:03
3. "Missing" (Chris & James Full on Club Mix) – 8:36
4. "Missing" (Ultramarine remix) – 5:26
5. "Missing" (Todd Terry Remix (Radio Edit)) – 3:55
6. "Missing" (Todd Terry Remix) – 4:00
7. "Missing" (Todd Terry Club Mix (US Radio Edit)) – 4:15
8. "Missing" (Todd Terry Club Mix) – 5:00
9. "Missing" (Todd Terry Extended Original Mix) – 9:05

== Charts ==
=== Weekly charts ===
| Chart (1994) | Peak position |
|---|---|
| Scottish Singles Sales (Official Charts) | 78 |
| UK Singles (Official Charts) | 69 |
| UK Club Chart (Music Week) | 22 |

| Chart (1995–1996) | Peak position |
|---|---|
| Australia (ARIA) | 2 |
| Austria (Ö3 Austria Top 40) | 6 |
| Belgium (Ultratop 50 Flanders) | 10 |
| Belgium (Ultratop 50 Wallonia) | 2 |
| Canada Top Singles (RPM) | 1 |
| Canada Adult Contemporary (RPM) | 1 |
| Canada Dance/Urban (RPM) | 1 |
| Czech Republic (IFPI CR) | 7 |
| Denmark (Tracklisten) | 1 |
| El Salvador (UPI) | 5 |
| Estonia (Eesti Top 20) | 4 |
| Europe (Eurochart Hot 100) | 3 |
| Europe (European Hit Radio) | 4 |
| Finland (Suomen virallinen lista) | 11 |
| France (SNEP) | 2 |
| Germany (GfK) | 1 |
| Hungary (Mahasz) | 1 |
| Iceland (Íslenski Listinn Topp 40) | 1 |
| Ireland (IRMA) | 3 |
| Israel (Israeli Singles Chart) | 13 |
| Italy (Musica e dischi) | 1 |
| Latvia (Latvijas Top 50) | 1 |
| Netherlands (Dutch Top 40) | 3 |
| Netherlands (Single Top 100) | 5 |
| New Zealand (Recorded Music NZ) | 14 |
| Norway (VG-lista) | 5 |
| Quebec (ADISQ) | 6 |
| Scottish Singles Sales (Official Charts) | 2 |
| Sweden (Sverigetopplistan) | 3 |
| Switzerland (Schweizer Hitparade) | 2 |
| UK Singles (Official Charts) | 3 |
| UK Dance (Official Charts) | 1 |
| US Billboard Hot 100 | 2 |
| US Adult Contemporary (Billboard) | 6 |
| US Adult Pop Airplay (Billboard) | 2 |
| US Dance Singles Sales (Billboard) | 1 |
| US Hot R&B/Hip-Hop Songs (Billboard) | 70 |
| US Pop Airplay (Billboard) | 1 |
| US Rhythmic Airplay (Billboard) | 6 |
| US Cash Box Top 100 | 1 |

=== Year-end charts ===
| Chart (1995) | Position |
|---|---|
| Belgium (Ultratop 50 Flanders) | 58 |
| Belgium (Ultratop 50 Wallonia) | 73 |
| Europe (Eurochart Hot 100) | 54 |
| France (SNEP) | 76 |
| Iceland (Íslenski Listinn Topp 40) | 13 |
| Latvia (Latvijas Top 50) | 174 |
| Netherlands (Dutch Top 40) | 9 |
| Netherlands (Single Top 100) | 36 |
| Sweden (Topplistan) | 47 |
| UK Singles (OCC) | 9 |
| UK Airplay (Music Week) | 25 |

| Chart (1996) | Position |
|---|---|
| Australia (ARIA) | 7 |
| Austria (Ö3 Austria Top 40) | 39 |
| Belgium (Ultratop 50 Flanders) | 72 |
| Belgium (Ultratop 50 Wallonia) | 17 |
| Canada Top Singles (RPM) | 9 |
| Canada Adult Contemporary (RPM) | 11 |
| Canada Dance/Urban (RPM) | 8 |
| Europe (Eurochart Hot 100) | 10 |
| France (SNEP) | 29 |
| Germany (Media Control) | 11 |
| Latvia (Latvijas Top 50) | 18 |
| Sweden (Topplistan) | 36 |
| Switzerland (Schweizer Hitparade) | 24 |
| UK Singles (OCC) | 62 |
| UK Airplay (Music Week) | 6 |
| US Billboard Hot 100 | 12 |
| US Adult Contemporary (Billboard) | 15 |
| US Adult Top 40 (Billboard) | 13 |
| US Maxi-Singles Sales (Billboard) | 11 |
| US Top 40/Mainstream (Billboard) | 4 |
| US Top 40/Rhythm-Crossover (Billboard) | 19 |

=== Decade-end charts ===
| Chart (1990–1999) | Position |
|---|---|
| Netherlands (Dutch Top 40) | 59 |

== Certifications ==
| Region | Certification | Certified units/sales |
|---|---|---|
| Australia (ARIA) | Platinum | 70,000^{^} |
| Belgium (BRMA) | Gold | 25,000^{*} |
| France (SNEP) | Gold | 250,000^{*} |
| Germany (BVMI) | Gold | 250,000^{^} |
| Italy (FIMI) | Gold | 25,000^{‡} |
| New Zealand (RMNZ) | Platinum | 30,000^{‡} |
| Norway (IFPI Norway) | Gold | |
| Spain (Promusicae) | Gold | 30,000^{‡} |
| United Kingdom (BPI) | 3× Platinum | 1,800,000^{‡} |
| United States (RIAA) | Gold | 500,000^{^} |
^{*} Sales figures based on certification alone.^{^} Shipments figures based on certification alone.^{‡} Sales+streaming figures based on certification alone.

== Release history ==
| Region | Version | Date | Format(s) | Label(s) | Ref. |
|---|---|---|---|---|---|
| United Kingdom | Original | 8 August 1994 | 12-inch vinyl; CD; cassette | Blanco y Negro | |
| Japan | Original | 2 November 1994 | CD | Cherry Red | |
| United States | Todd Terry remix | 23 May 1995 | Contemporary hit radio | Atlantic | |
| United Kingdom | Todd Terry remix | 16 October 1995 | 12-inch vinyl; CD; cassette | Blanco y Negro | |
| Australia | Todd Terry remix | 27 November 1995 | CD | Blanco y Negro | |
| Japan | Todd Terry remix | 21 December 1995 | CD | Toy's Factory; Vap; Cherry Red | |

== No Mercy version ==
"Missing (I Miss You Like the Deserts Miss the Rain)"

Single by No Mercy

from the album My Promise and No Mercy
- Released: September 1995
- Genre: Dance-pop
- Length: 3:59
- Label: MCI; BMG; Arista
- Composer: Ben Watt
- Lyricist: Tracey Thorn
- Producer: Frank Farian

No Mercy singles chronology
| "Missing (I Miss You Like the Deserts Miss the Rain)" (1995) | "Where Do You Go" (1996) |

In 1995, Germany-based music trio No Mercy released their version of "Missing" with the subtitle "I Miss You Like the Deserts Miss the Rain". It was produced by Frank Farian and appeared on their debut album, My Promise (1996), and its North American counterpart, No Mercy. Stylistically, the cover is largely based on the remix by Todd Terry. It was a moderate hit, peaking within the top 20 in Germany and top 10 in Switzerland. In the music video, the band members of No Mercy are looking for a woman.

=== Track listing ===
- 12-inch
1. "Missing (I Miss You Like the Deserts Miss the Rain)" (Ibiza club mix) – 6:30
2. "Missing (I Miss You Like the Deserts Miss the Rain)" (acapella version) – 5:25
3. "Missing (I Miss You Like the Deserts Miss the Rain)" (Manumission Trance mix) – 6:30
4. "Missing (I Miss You Like the Deserts Miss the Rain)" (radio version) – 3:58

=== Charts ===
==== Weekly charts ====
| Chart (1995–1996) | Peak position |
|---|---|
| France (SNEP) | 48 |
| France Airplay (SNEP) | 33 |
| Germany (GfK) | 19 |
| Switzerland (Schweizer Hitparade) | 9 |
| UK Singles (Official Charts) | 83 |
| UK Club Chart (Music Week) | 75 |

==== Year-end charts ====
| Chart (1996) | Position |
|---|---|
| Germany (Media Control) | 94 |

== Other cover versions ==
In 2021, British singer Will Young covered "Missing" on his album Crying on the Bathroom Floor. In 2019, Caroline Polachek covered it for SiriusXM as part of her promotion for her debut album, Pang. It has been covered by a number of different artists as listed on SecondHandSongs which include Natasha Bedingfield and Hurts.
