= Eden (Everything but the Girl album) =

Studio album by Everything but the Girl
- Released: 4 June 1984
- Recorded: January 1984
- Studio: Power Plant (London)
- Genre: Indie pop; sophisti-pop; new wave; jazz
- Length: 33:40
- Label: Blanco y Negro
- Producer: Robin Millar

Everything but the Girl chronology
Eden (1984)	Everything but the Girl (1984)

Singles from Eden
- 1. "Each and Every One" Released: 23 April 1984

Eden is the debut studio album by the British musical duo Everything but the Girl. It was released on 4 June 1984, by Blanco y Negro Records. The album contains the single "Each and Every One", which peaked at number 28 on the UK Singles Chart. The cover design was by lead singer Tracey Thorn's former colleague in Marine Girls, Jane Fox.

== Background and release ==
Eden was the first professional recording by Everything but the Girl with a bigger company and a proper producer, Robin Millar, who was simultaneously producing Sade's Diamond Life. Though it was finished in the autumn of 1983, it wasn't released until June 1984, due to contractual obligations between the group and Cherry Red Records.

By the time Eden was finally released, the group felt it didn't represent their current sound and interests and did very little promotion for it. "Each and Every One", the only single, became a UK Top 40 single that surpassed the group's expectations and previous efforts.

In the time between recording and releasing Eden, Thorn and Watt opened themselves to new influences, mostly The Smiths, with whom they became close. "Never Could Have Been Worse" (the b-side to "Each and Every One") showed this influence in sound and lyrics. This was part of the band's following two singles.

"Mine" was released only four weeks after Eden, and marked a departure from the album's themes and sound, with Thorn singing about a single mother and gender politics involved in surnames. It reached No. 58 in the UK Singles Chart. "Native Land", which featured Smiths Johnny Marr on harmonica, only reached to No. 73. Although these weren't included in Eden, they did make the USA-only album Everything but the Girl.

== Critical reception ==
Professional ratings
Review scores
Source	Rating
AllMusic	4.5/5 stars
Clash	8/10
Mojo	5/5 stars
Number One	4/5
Pitchfork	7.0/10
Record Collector	4/5 stars
Record Mirror	4/5 stars
Smash Hits	8/10
Spin Alternative Record Guide	8/10
Uncut	8/10

Eden was met with critical acclaim and NME ranked it number 20 among the "Albums of the Year" for 1984.

In May 1984, the album and the single "Each and Every One" were reviewed by three panellists on the BBC2 programme, 8 Days a Week. George Michael stated that he liked the single and loved Tracey Thorn's "beautiful voice", and added that "Plain Sailing" was his favourite track of hers. Morrissey stated that he did not like the single, but that he liked "at least half of the album". He added that he thought "Another Bridge" from the album "is really quite spectacular". Tony Blackburn stated that he liked the bossa nova rhythm of the single, which he described as "an old sound come back again".

By 2012, Eden had sold around 500,000 copies. Eden was reissued in 2012 as a remastered two-disc deluxe set by Edsel Records.

== Track listing ==
No.	Title	Writer(s)	Length
1.	"Each and Every One"	Tracey Thorn; Ben Watt	2:45
2.	"Bittersweet"	Thorn	2:49
3.	"Tender Blue"	Watt	3:02
4.	"Another Bridge"	Thorn; Watt	2:11
5.	"The Spice of Life"	Thorn	3:29
6.	"The Dustbowl"	Thorn	1:37
7.	"Crabwalk (Instrumental)"	Watt	3:25
8.	"Even So"	Thorn	2:31
9.	"Frost and Fire"	Thorn; Watt	3:11
10.	"Fascination"	Thorn	3:20
11.	"I Must Confess"	Watt	3:10
12.	"Soft Touch"	Watt	2:01

=== 2012 Edsel Records reissue ===
Disc 2
No.	Title	Writer(s)	Length
1.	"Laugh You Out the House"	Thorn	1:49
2.	"Never Could Have Been Worse"	Watt	2:45
3.	"Mine"	Thorn	3:22
4.	"Gun Cupboard Love"	Thorn	3:01
5.	"Easy as Sin"	Watt	2:58
6.	"Native Land"	Thorn; Watt	3:08
7.	"Riverbed Dry"	Thorn; Watt	2:45
8.	"Don't You Go"	Thorn; Watt	3:28
9.	"Each and Every One" (home demo, 1983)	Thorn; Watt	2:52
10.	"Bittersweet" (home demo, 1983)	Thorn	3:05
11.	"Even So" (home demo, 1983)	Thorn	1:52
12.	"Frost and Fire" (home demo, 1983)	Thorn; Watt	2:13
13.	"Soft Touch" (home demo, 1983)	Watt	1:49
14.	"Another Bridge" (BBC session recording, 1984)	Thorn; Watt	2:19
15.	"Easy as Sin" (BBC session recording, 1984)	Watt	3:14
16.	"Riverbed Dry" (BBC session recording, 1984)	Thorn; Watt	2:44
17.	"Never Could Have Been Worse" (BBC session recording, 1984)	Watt	2:44

== Personnel ==
Everything but the Girl

- Tracey Thorn – vocals, acoustic guitar
- Ben Watt – guitars, vocals, Hammond organ, piano, horn arrangements

Additional musicians

- Simon Booth – guitar
- Joao Bosco De Oliveira – percussion
- Charles Hayward – drums
- Chucho Merchán – double bass
- Dick Pearce – flugelhorn
- Nigel Nash – tenor saxophone
- Pete King – alto saxophone

Technical

- Mike Pela – engineering
- Jane Fox – cover design

== Charts ==
Chart (1984)	Peak position
Dutch Albums (Album Top 100)	3
New Zealand Albums (RMNZ)	28
UK Albums (OCC)	14

== Certifications ==
Region	Certification	Certified units/sales
Netherlands (NVPI)	Gold	50,000^{^}
United Kingdom (BPI)	Gold	100,000^{^}
^{^} Shipments figures based on certification alone.
