= I Don't Want to Talk About It =

1971 song by Crazy Horse

Song by Crazy Horse

from the album Crazy Horse
- Released: February 1971
- Length: 5:18
- Label: Reprise
- Songwriter: Danny Whitten
- Producers: Jack Nitzsche, Russ Titelman, Bruce Botnick

"I Don't Want to Talk About It" is a song written by American guitarist Danny Whitten. It was first recorded by American rock band Crazy Horse and issued as the final track on side one of their 1971 eponymous album. It was Whitten's signature tune, but gained more fame via its numerous cover versions, especially that by Rod Stewart. Cash Box magazine has described it as "a magnificent ballad outing."

== Original recording personnel ==
- Danny Whitten — guitar, lead vocals
- Nils Lofgren — guitar, backing vocals
- Ry Cooder — slide guitar
- Billy Talbot — bass guitar

== Rod Stewart version ==
"I Don't Want to Talk About It"

Single by Rod Stewart

from the album Atlantic Crossing
- A-side: "The First Cut Is the Deepest"
- Released: March 1977
- Length: 4:13 (single version)
- Label: Riva
- Songwriter: Danny Whitten
- Producer: Tom Dowd

Rod Stewart singles chronology
"Get Back" (1976)	"I Don't Want to Talk About It" (1977)	"The First Cut Is the Deepest" (1977)

Music video
- "I Don't Want to Talk About It" on YouTube

British singer Rod Stewart recorded the song at Muscle Shoals Sound Studio in Sheffield, Alabama for his 1975 album Atlantic Crossing. When it was released as a single in 1977, it topped the singles chart in the United Kingdom as a double A-side with "The First Cut Is the Deepest". The song is widely believed to have benefitted from being deliberately released as a budget single in order to keep the Sex Pistols' "God Save the Queen" off the top of the UK singles chart. In February 2021, the song received a silver certification from the British Phonographic Industry for sales and streams of over 200,000.

In the United States, it was released as a single (b/w "The Best Days of My Life") in December 1979 to promote Stewart's Greatest Hits album. It peaked at number 46 on the Billboard Hot 100 and number 44 Adult Contemporary.

In 1989, Stewart cut a new rendition of the song for Storyteller – The Complete Anthology: 1964–1990. It was later included on Downtown Train – Selections from the Storyteller Anthology. The song received extensive airplay on adult contemporary radio stations in the United States as an album cut, reaching number two on the Billboard Adult Contemporary chart. Stewart also sang this song as a duet with Amy Belle during his 2004 tour and it is included in his concert DVD. The official Rod Stewart video of the performance has received over 1 billion Youtube views (as of September 23, 2024).

=== Charts ===
==== Weekly charts ====
Chart (1977–1980)	Peak position
Australia (Kent Music Report)	19
Belgium (Ultratop 50 Flanders)	11
Belgium (Ultratop 50 Wallonia)	36
Canada Top Singles (RPM)	51
Ireland (IRMA)	4
Netherlands (Single Top 100)	3
New Zealand (Recorded Music NZ)	2
UK Singles (Official Charts)	1
US Billboard Hot 100	46
US Adult Contemporary (Billboard)	44
West Germany (GfK)	44

Chart (1990)	Peak position
Canada Top Singles (RPM)	19
Canada Adult Contemporary (RPM)	3
US Adult Contemporary (Billboard)	2

==== Year-end charts ====
Chart (1977)	Position
Australia (Kent Music Report)	70

=== Certifications ===
Certifications for "I Don't Want to Talk About It" Rod Stewart version
Region	Certification	Certified units/sales
New Zealand (RMNZ)	Gold	15,000^{‡}
^{‡} Sales+streaming figures based on certification alone.

== Everything but the Girl version ==
"I Don't Want to Talk About It"

Single by Everything but the Girl

from the album Idlewild
- B-side: "Oxford Street"
- Released: 1988
- Genre: Folk-pop
- Length: 4:17
- Label: Blanco y Negro
- Songwriter: Danny Whitten
- Producer: Ben Watt

Everything but the Girl singles chronology
"I Always Was Your Girl" (1988)	"I Don't Want to Talk About It" (1988)	"Love Is Here Where I Live" (1989)

In 1988, English musical duo Everything but the Girl released their version of the song as a stand-alone single; it was later included on the reissue of their fourth studio album, Idlewild (1988). Tracey Thorn has said that Stewart had been regarded as "a heroic figure" in her home when she was growing up, and that her brother Keith owned the "albums with grimy-sounding titles like An Old Raincoat Won't Ever Let You Down, and Gasoline Alley". She herself had "always liked Atlantic Crossing."

This version was also met with success in the UK, peaking at number three on the UK Singles Chart. It was the duo's first British top-10 hit and would remain their only one until 1995, when the Todd Terry remix of "Missing" also peaked at number three. Outside the UK, the song reached number three in Ireland and number 19 in New Zealand.

=== Charts ===
==== Weekly charts ====
Chart (1988)	Peak position
Europe (Eurochart Hot 100)	9
Ireland (IRMA)	3
Italy Airplay (Music & Media)	1
Netherlands (Single Top 100)	85
New Zealand (Recorded Music NZ)	19
UK Singles (Official Charts)	3

==== Year-end charts ====
Chart (1988)	Position
UK Singles (OCC)	75
