= Baby, the Stars Shine Bright (album) =

Studio album by Everything but the Girl
- Released: 25 August 1986
- Recorded: March–April 1986
- Studio: Abbey Road Studios, London
- Genre: Pop
- Label: Blanco y Negro
- Producer: Everything but the Girl; Mike Hedges

Everything but the Girl chronology
Love Not Money (1985)	Baby, the Stars Shine Bright (1986)	Idlewild (1988)

Singles from Baby, the Stars Shine Bright
- 1. "Come on Home" Released: 1986; 2. "Don't Leave Me Behind" Released: 1986; 3. "Cross My Heart" Released: 1987

Professional ratings
Review scores
Source	Rating
AllMusic	3/5 stars
Number One	4/5 stars
Pitchfork	7.2/10
Q	4/5 stars
Record Mirror	3 1/2/5
The Rolling Stone Album Guide	3/5 stars
Spin Alternative Record Guide	6/10
Uncut	5/10

Baby, the Stars Shine Bright is the third studio album by British musical duo Everything but the Girl. It was released on 25 August 1986 by Blanco y Negro Records. The album was reissued in 2012 as a remastered two-disc deluxe set by Edsel Records.

== Background ==
Following the duo's distinctively "anti-rock" approach and their unwillingness to adopt a synthetic sounding production that was fashionable at the time, the album took its influence from 1960s orchestrated music and the singer Dusty Springfield.

== Track listing ==
No.	Title	Writer(s)	Length
1.	"Come on Home"	Tracey Thorn; Ben Watt	3:21
2.	"Don't Leave Me Behind"	Thorn; Watt	3:15
3.	"A Country Mile"	Thorn	3:04
4.	"Cross My Heart"	Thorn; Watt	3:41
5.	"Don't Let the Teardrops Rust Your Shining Heart"	Watt	3:21
6.	"Careless"	Watt	3:26
7.	"Sugar Finney"	Thorn; Watt	3:34
8.	"Come Hell or High Water"	Thorn; Watt	3:22
9.	"Fighting Talk"	Thorn; Watt	3:20
10.	"Little Hitler"	Thorn	4:05

=== 2012 Edsel Records reissue ===
Disc 2
No.	Title	Writer(s)	Length
1.	"Come on Home" (extended mix)	Thorn; Watt	4:12
2.	"Draining the Bar"	Thorn	2:08
3.	"I Fall to Pieces"	Hank Cochran; Harlan Howard	2:43
4.	"Come on Home" (acoustic)	Thorn; Watt	2:36
5.	"Alfie"	Burt Bacharach; Hal David	2:50
6.	"Where's the Playground Susie?"	Jimmy Webb	2:30
7.	"Almost Blue"	Declan MacManus	3:20
8.	"Come on Home" (home demo, 1985)	Thorn; Watt	3:06
9.	"Sugar Finney" (home demo, 1985)	Thorn; Watt	3:21
10.	"Careless" (home demo, 1985)	Watt	3:18
11.	"Cross My Heart" (home demo, 1985)	Thorn; Watt	2:48
12.	"Little Hitler" (home demo, 1985)	Thorn	4:09

== Personnel ==
Everything but the Girl

- Tracey Thorn – vocals
- Ben Watt – guitar, orchestral arrangements

Additional musicians

- Micky Harris – bass
- Cara Tivey – organ, piano
- Rob Peters – drums
- Jeff Daly, Philip Todd, Peter King, Nigel Nash, Ray Swinfield – saxophone
- Alan Downey, Derek Watkins, Luke Tunney, Stuart Brooks – trumpet
- Andy Fawbert, Peter Thoms, Chris Pyne, Alan Hutt – trombone
- James Handy, John Pigneguy – French horn
- Gavyn Wright, Wilfred Gibson, John Willison, Richard Studt, Dave Woodcock, James Archer, Levine Andrade, Basil Smart, Bill Benham, Peter Oxer, Tim Good – violin
- Kenneth Essex, George Robertson, Cathy Stevens, David Emanuel, Roger Garland – viola
- Chris Green, Paul Kegg, Helen Liebmann, Clive Anstee – cello
- Clare Torry, Linda Allen, Bob Saker, Lance Ellington, Gary Taylor, Tony Burrows, Vicky Silva, Tessa Niles – backing vocals
- Steve Henderson, Joao Bosco De Oliveira, Frank Ricotti, Martin Ditcham – percussion
- Nick Ingman – conductor, director

Technical

- Caryn Gough – artwork
- Richard Haughton – photography

== Charts ==
Chart (1986)	Peak position
Dutch Albums (Album Top 100)	30
New Zealand Albums (RMNZ)	40
UK Albums (Official Charts)	22

== Certifications ==
Region	Certification	Certified units/sales
United Kingdom (BPI)	Gold	100,000^{^}
^{^} Shipments figures based on certification alone.
