= Everything but the Girl =

English musical duo

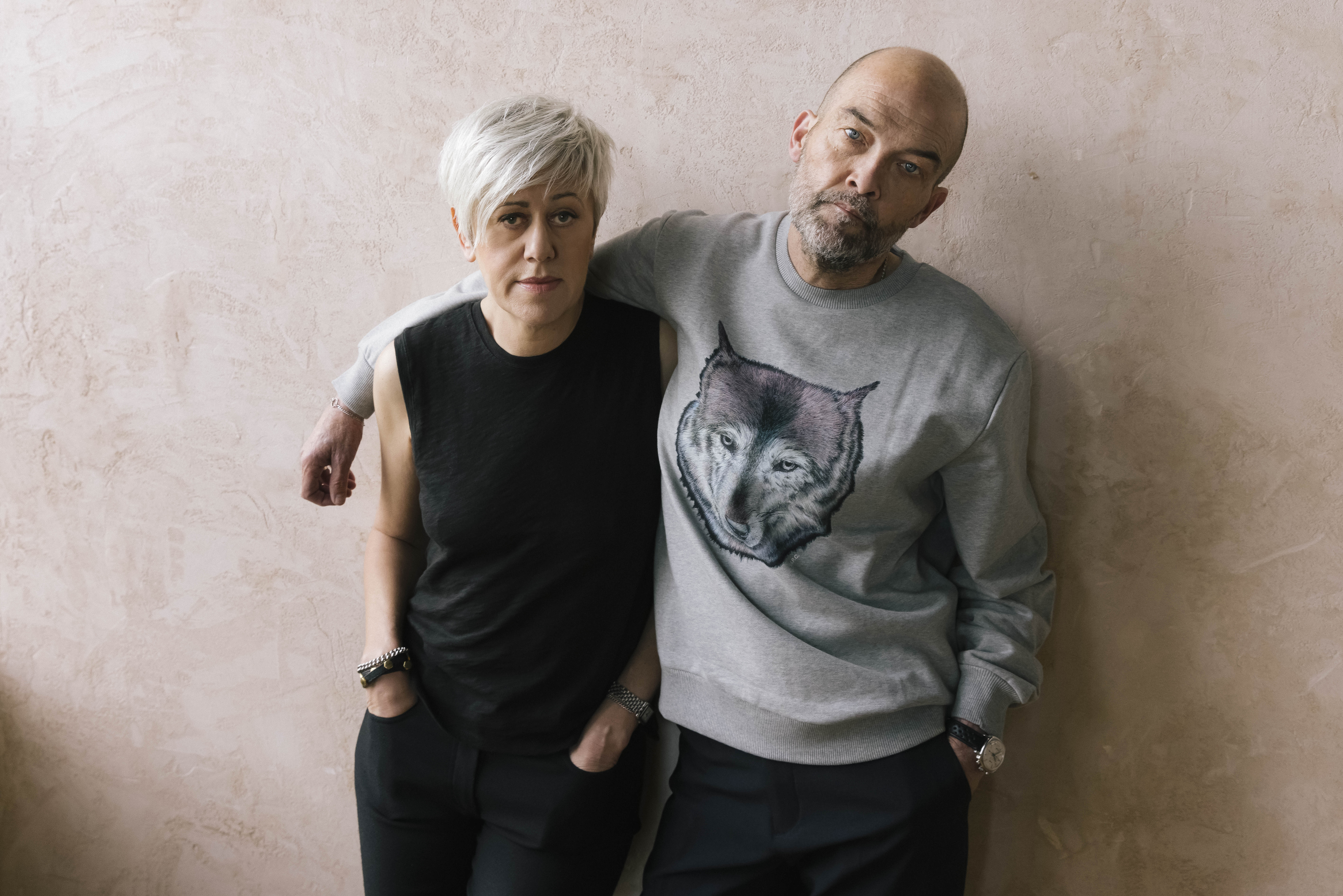
- Tracey Thorn and Ben Watt in 2022

Background information
- Also known as: EBTG
- Origin: Hull, East Riding of Yorkshire, England
- Genres: Pop; sophisti-pop; jazz-pop; indie pop; folk-pop; electronica; drum and bass; trip hop
- Works: Discography
- Years active: 1982–2000; 2021–present
- Labels: Sire/Warner Bros.; Atlantic; Blanco y Negro; Virgin; Chrysalis
- Members: Tracey Thorn; Ben Watt
- Website: ebtg.com

Everything but the Girl are an English pop duo formed in Kingston upon Hull in 1982, consisting of lead singer, songwriter, composer and occasional guitarist Tracey Thorn and guitarist, keyboardist, songwriter, composer, producer and singer Ben Watt. The group's early works have been categorized as sophisti-pop with jazz influences before undergoing an electronic music turn following the worldwide success of the 1994 hit single "Missing", remixed by Todd Terry.

The duo have achieved 12 top-40 singles in the UK, including four reaching the top 10 and received eight gold and two platinum album BPI certifications in the UK as well as one gold album RIAA certification in the US. Their cover of "I Don't Want to Talk About It" reached No. 3 on the UK Singles Chart in 1988, a feat later matched by "Missing", which charted high in several countries and reached No. 2 on the U.S. Billboard Hot 100 in 1995. The "Missing" remix spent over seven months on the UK Singles Chart, which led to a Brit Award nomination for Best British Single.

Their ninth album, Walking Wounded (1996), entered the UK albums chart at No. 4, and spawned the top-10 singles "Walking Wounded" and "Wrong". The band went inactive in 2000, with Thorn declaring she would no longer perform live. Thorn and Watt, who did not publicise their romantic relationship while active, married in 2009, both released solo albums and said it was unlikely Everything but the Girl would be active again.

However, in November 2022, Thorn and Watt announced that they had just completed work on a new Everything but the Girl album. Fuse, the band's first new material in 24 years. The album was released on 21 April 2023. It charted at No. 3 on the Official UK Album Chart, making it the highest-charting album of their career. In a 5-star review, The Guardian said: "Still staking out pop's frontier after 40 years. It is audibly made by people with a deep love for and understanding of the music they're inspired by a comeback worth waiting for.”

== History ==
=== Formation and early years ===
When Thorn and Watt met, they were both attending the University of Hull and both had contracted with the independent record company Cherry Red Records as solo artists. Thorn was also a member of the trio Marine Girls.

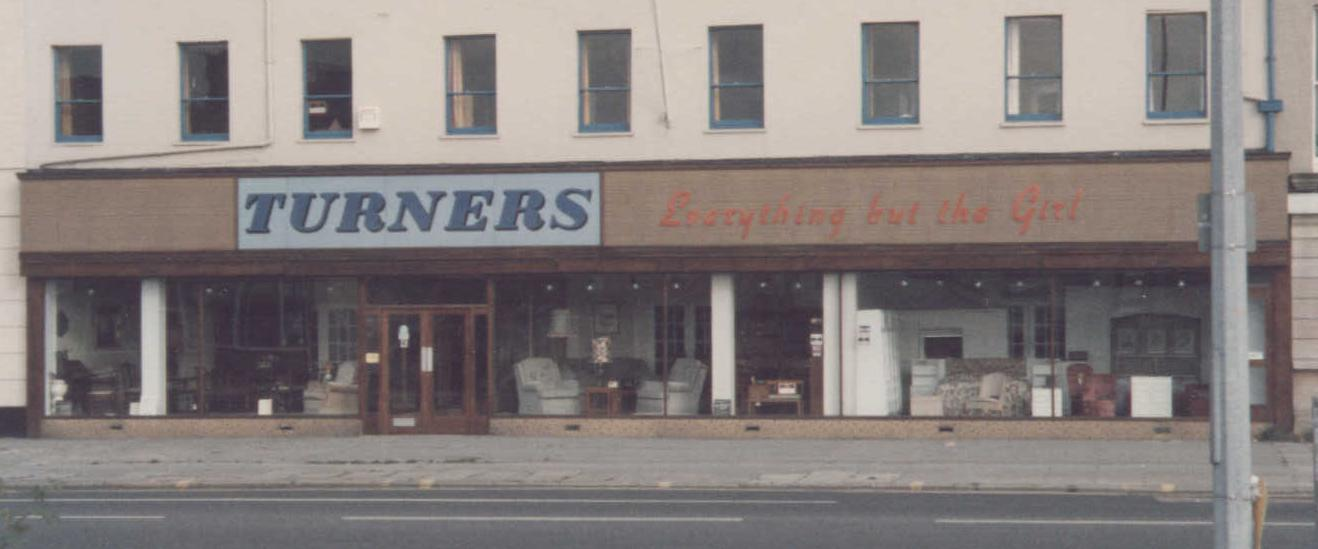
1985 view of Turners, with the slogan Everything but the Girl

They formed a side-project as a duo and adopted the name Everything but the Girl from a slogan used by the Hull shop, Turner's Furniture at 34–38 Beverley Road, between Norfolk Street and College Street.

Everything but the Girl's debut EP, with a "samba interpretation" of Cole Porter's "Night and Day", was released in June 1982. After steady sales and exposure on the Cherry Red Records 99-pence promotional Christmas 1982 compilation album entitled Pillows & Prayers, the single was reissued in August 1983.

Later, the pair each had solo album releases through Cherry Red. Thorn's 1982 LP was A Distant Shore, an eight-track mini-album. Watt's 1983 debut LP, North Marine Drive, was the follow-up to his 1982 5-track EP Summer Into Winter, featuring Robert Wyatt.

On 5 January 1983, Tracey Thorn and Ben Watt, as Everything But the Girl, made their live debut at the Institute of Contemporary Arts in London, and performed with Paul Weller.

Thorn and Watt, as Everything but the Girl, signed to Blanco y Negro Records.

Recorded in September 1983,, their debut album, Eden, was released in May 1984, reaching No. 14 on the UK Albums Chart, spending 20 weeks on the chart. It featured the single "Each and Every One", which reached No. 28 on the UK Singles Chart. Thorn wrote in 2016 that her lyric was misunderstood as a lovelorn lament, when it was actually a response to the patronizing tone her earlier all-female band Marine Girls was written about by male music critics.

In spite of their early history as established independent artists, as newcomers Everything but the Girl were considered part of the "lite-jazz/neo-jazz-pop" music style, later known as "sophisti-pop", alongside other British acts such as Carmel, a then-newly-solo Alison Moyet, Swing Out Sister, Sade, Matt Bianco and The Style Council. Both Watt and Thorn were guest musicians on the Style Council's Café Bleu album, where Thorn's vocals were featured on The Paris Match. Everything but the Girl worked with producer Robin Millar, who also produced Sade's debut album in the same studio, alternating between recording and collaborating with the two bands.

A later version of the album, Everything but the Girl, was released in the United States on the Sire label, containing six tracks from Eden, two UK singles and four alternate tracks, the six substitutions replace the second side.

Love Not Money, released in 1985, was the band's second studio-album release, signaling a move away from jazz and Latin influences to more traditional electric guitar, bass and drums arrangements. The US edition included two songs not on the original UK release: a cover version of the Pretenders song "Kid", and "Heaven Help Me".

In 1986, the band released Baby, the Stars Shine Bright, recorded with an orchestra at Abbey Road Studios. They revealed the album's inspiration by their choices of B-sides for the single releases: songs from Bacharach and Jimmy Webb on the 12" versions (as well as a cover version of Patsy Cline's "I Fall to Pieces"). The first single from the album was "Come on Home", followed by "Don't Leave Me Behind".

In 1988 Everything but the Girl released Idlewild. Blending acoustic instrumentation with sequenced drums and synthesisers, it reached No. 13 on the UK Albums Chart, spending 15 weeks on the chart. A cover version of Danny Whitten's "I Don't Want to Talk About It", previously a success for Rod Stewart, was released as a single shortly afterwards. It reached No. 3 on the UK Singles Chart and was added to the latter issues of the album. Around this time, Lloyd Cole and the Commotions asked Thorn to contribute vocals to the song "Big Snake" on their final studio album, Mainstream.

1990's Los Angeles-recorded "slick, commercial" album The Language of Life was produced by Tommy LiPuma and featured notable US west-coast and east-coast session musicians, including Omar Hakim, Vinnie Colaiuta, Lenny Castro, Joe Sample and Michael Brecker. Stan Getz contributed a tenor sax solo on the song "The Road". The single "Driving". received heavy rotation on American adult alternative radio.

In 1991 they released the self-produced album Worldwide. It reached No. 29 on the UK albums chart.

1992 saw the release of the acoustic Covers EP. It reached No. 13 on the UK chart. The lead track was "Love Is Strange". It also included cover versions of Bruce Springsteen's "Tougher Than the Rest"; Cyndi Lauper's "Time after Time" and Elvis Costello's "Alison". These four tracks were included on the US only album, Acoustic.

In mid-1992 the duo was forced to curtail recording and touring for several months when Watt became seriously ill. He was eventually diagnosed with eosinophilic granulomatosis with polyangiitis, a rare autoimmune disease. Watt was hospitalised for 10 weeks, and endured several life-saving operations; he subsequently wrote a memoir, Patient, about his near-death ordeal.

In 1993, Everything but the Girl released two EPs in the UK. One featured a cover version of Paul Simon's "The Only Living Boy in New York". The other spawned a top-10 UK hit, "I Didn't Know I Was Looking for Love", for Karen Ramirez.

=== Worldwide acclaim ===
In 1994 Everything but the Girl released their seventh album, Amplified Heart, a hybrid of folk rock and electronica featuring contributions from guitarist Richard Thompson, double bassist Danny Thompson, drummer Dave Mattacks, and producer/programmer John Coxon. Producer Todd Terry remixed the track "Missing", and when released as a single, it became an international success. It reached the top ten around the world, including the US, where it peaked at No. 2 in the Billboard Hot 100.

While recording Amplified Heart Thorn and Watt wrote lyrics and music for two tracks – "Protection" and "Better Things" on Massive Attack's second album Protection. Thorn sang lead vocals on both. The single "Protection" reached No. 14 on the UK top 40. The album reached No. 4 on the UK Albums Chart.

Buoyed by the recent successes and out of contract at WEA, Everything but the Girl released the self-produced Walking Wounded in 1996 exclusively licensed to Atlantic Records for the United States and Canada and Virgin Records for the Rest of the World. Featuring collaborations with Spring Heel Jack and Howie B it ushered in a new electronic sound for their own work. It charted at No. 4 on the UK Albums Chart and spawned two top ten UK singles – "Walking Wounded" and "Wrong". Two further singles – "Single" and "Before Today" – reached No. 20 and No. 25 respectively.

In 1999 the duo followed it up with their ninth studio album, Temperamental. It charted at No. 16 on the UK Albums Chart.

The duo performed what was then considered their final show at the Montreux Jazz Festival in 2000.

=== Extended hiatus ===
Self-awareness is a dangerous thing: by about the third or fourth record, people were throwing comparisons at us and you have to be very tough to withstand it. And by the end of the '90s, we were playing to 5,000 people a night. I'd stand on stage, looking out, thinking, "I don't want to be this big."

— Ben Watt in 2012, recalled a lacklustre feeling from the late 1990s, during the latter years of EBTG.

Between 2000 and 2022, there were no new recordings from Everything but the Girl. In 2002, 2004 and 2005, the duo curated compilations of their material. The 2004 compilation Like the Deserts Miss the Rain was a DVD release that included footage of a 1999 performance at the Forum venue in London, UK, for which John McKenzie and long-time collaborator Martin Ditcham performed alongside the pair as session musicians.

From 1999 Watt concentrated on DJ and production/remix work, finding success as a member of Lazy Dog, with partner Jay Hannan, and collaborating with Beth Orton on her 1999 album Central Reservation and her 2002 album Daybreaker. Watt then proceeded with a new angle on his solo career that included launching the Buzzin' Fly record label in 2003, and becoming the part-owner-founder of the Neighbourhood and Cherry Jam nightclubs from 2002–2005. Watt released a string of club-oriented productions including the Bright Star EP, with producer Stimming and British singer Julia Biel, on Buzzin' Fly in 2010.

In 2005, Thorn co-wrote and recorded vocals for the song "Damage", a collaboration with German band Tiefschwarz which appeared on their Eat Books album. Thorn's second solo album, Out of the Woods, was released in 2007, followed by her third solo album, Love and Its Opposite, in 2010. In October 2011 Thorn released a cover version of The xx's "Night Time", on which Watt played guitar and sang backing vocals. This was their first recording together in over a decade, although it was not an Everything but the Girl release.

In an April 2011 interview, Thorn was asked whether she would ever work again with Watt as Everything but the Girl. She responded, "Yes, we do keep saying we are nearly ready to maybe do some work together again. There are certain obstacles, some practical, some psychological, that we would need to overcome. But it may well happen." A collection of Christmas songs, Tinsel and Lights, for which Thorn recorded cover versions of Christmas songs with two new original songs, was released in October 2012 on Buzzin' Fly's sister record label Strange Feeling. Watt and the couple's children provided backing vocals on the original song "Joy".

In 2012 the band's first four albums were reissued by Edsel Records as "deluxe" double CDs, with demo recordings and other additional material. At the time, Watt explained that Warner Music Group still maintained control over their back catalogue: "our big fear was that one day we'd wake up and they'd have reissued them, without telling us."; when the representative from Edsel, a company that specialises in reissued material, made contact, the couple decided that the time was appropriate. Additionally, Thorn stated that the thought of reforming the band and playing live filled her "with cold dread"—upon re-listening to the early Everything but the Girl records, Thorn experienced a sense of "Gosh, well, I'm not really that person any more."

A second tranche of Demon/Edsel reissues, covering the four albums released from 1990 to 1994, was announced in September 2013. According to the Everything but the Girl website, "Once again, Ben and Tracey have helped at every stage of the process, sourcing demos, rarities and memorabilia for the releases."

The band's latest two albums, Walking Wounded and Temperamental, were given the deluxe treatment and were reissued by Demon/Edsel on 4 September 2015.

Watt paused his association with record labels and DJ activities to return to his folk-jazz singer-songwriter roots in 2014. His first solo album since 1983, Hendra, was released on 14 April 2014. It featured collaborations with Bernard Butler, formerly of the band Suede, Berlin-based producer Ewan Pearson and David Gilmour of Pink Floyd. The album won the 'Best 'Difficult' Second Album' category at the AIM Independent Music Awards 2014. It was included at No 27 in Uncut's Top 75 Albums of 2014. He followed it up in 2016 with Fever Dream. It continued his relationship with Bernard Butler, and added guest cameos from MC Taylor of North Carolina folk-rock band Hiss Golden Messenger and Boston singer-songwriter Marissa Nadler. It received a 9/10 review in Uncut magazine. In a four-star review, The Guardian said: 'In his early 50s, he is making some of the best music of his career.'

In addition to solo music projects, both Thorn and Watt have written books. Thorn's 2013 memoir Bedsit Disco Queen covers a significant portion of the history of Everything but the Girl as a band.

In July 2017 Everything but the Girl reclaimed the rights to eight of their albums, plus the American rights to Temperamental and Walking Wounded from Warner Music Group; this catalogue will now be distributed through Chrysalis Records under licence from Watt's Strange Feeling label.

=== Fuse, gigs in London, and Blue Reservoir ===
On 2 November 2022 Thorn announced on Twitter a new Everything but the Girl album had been recorded and would be released in spring 2023.

The first single from their 11th album Fuse, "Nothing Left to Lose", premiered on BBC Radio 6 Music on 10 January 2023. Fuse was released on 21 April 2023 and features "Nothing Left to Lose" along with nine more original songs, both electronic and acoustic.

On 9 August they released Live at Maida Vale, a four-track EP featuring live in-studio performances of three Fuse songs and 1996's "Single".

Watt and Thorn announced to their mailing list on 12 March 2025 they would be playing two intimate live shows in April 2025 at a 200-capacity venue in East London, performing as a "part-acoustic part-electronic duo [...] drawing on songs from their 40-year careers as both solo artists and a duo". Thorn also stated that "If it goes well we hope to do more." After the success of the April shows, further dates were added throughout 2025, continuing into 2026; this included two dates at the 900-capacity Union Chapel in May.

On 10 September 2025 a new compilation was announced, The Best of Everything But the Girl. The 16-track album, released on 14 November, spanned their 40-year-plus career to date, from "Night and Day" to Fuse.

During the intimate shows in London in June 2026, the group performed a new song, "Young and Dumb". Introducing the song, they explained that they had been writing new material influenced by Milton Nascimento and other Brazilian musicians, and that they would be recording the songs for a new album in the summer of 2026. "Young and Dumb" was released as a single and had its world premiere on BBC Radio 6 Music on 28 October. On the same day their twelfth studio album, Blue Reservoir, was announced, due for release on 19 February 2027.

== Awards and nominations ==
Year	Awards	Work	Category	Result	Ref.
1990	D&AD Awards	"Driving"	Animation	Wood Pencil	
1996	Viva Comet Awards	Themselves	Best International Act	Won	
1996	MTV Europe Music Awards	Themselves	Best Dance	Nominated	
1996	MTV Video Music Awards	"Missing"	Best Dance Video	Nominated	
1996	Brit Awards	"Missing"	British Single of the Year	Nominated	
1996	Ivor Novello Awards	"Missing"	The Best Selling Song	Nominated	
1997	Music Week Awards	Walking Wounded	Best Art Direction	Won	
2000	Billboard Music Video Awards	"Five Fathoms"	Dance Clip of the Year	Nominated	
2007	BMI London Awards	"Missing"	3 Million Award	Won	
2024	Music Producers Guild Awards	Fuse	Self-Producing Artist of the Year	Won	
2024	Hungarian Music Awards	Fuse	Foreign Alternative Album	Nominated	
2026	Libera Awards	The Best of Everything But the Girl	Best Reissue	Nominated	

== Collaborations ==
- Under the Cover – Other People Sing Other People's Songs – "Alfie" (1988)
- "Protection" (with Massive Attack)
- Batman Forever Soundtrack – "The Hunter Gets Captured by the Game" (with Massive Attack)
- Back to Mine – remix CD remixed by Everything but the Girl
- She's Having a Baby Soundtrack – "Apron Strings"
- Red Hot + Rio (1996 AIDS benefit album produced by the Red Hot Organization) – "Corcovado (Quiet Night of Quiet Stars)"
- The Saint Motion Picture Soundtrack – "Before Today" (2005)

== Discography ==
- Eden (1984)
- Love Not Money (1985)
- Baby, the Stars Shine Bright (1986)
- Idlewild (1988)
- The Language of Life (1990)
- Worldwide (1991)
- Acoustic (1992)
- Amplified Heart (1994)
- Walking Wounded (1996)
- Temperamental (1999)
- Fuse (2023)
- Blue Reservoir (2027)
