= Deep Blue (musician) =

British musician

Deep Blue is the alias of electronic and drum and bass musician Sean O'Keeffe.

O'Keeffe started producing music in 1991 with the hardcore group 2 Bad Mice, co-writing their hit, "Bombscare". In 1993, he began to write and release under the alias Deep Blue, producing "Helicopter Tune" (also heard in the PSP and PlayStation 2 game Grand Theft Auto: Liberty City Stories (2005) and in the game Midnight Club 3: Dub Edition (2005) for the Moving Shadow record label. The track reached number 68 on the UK Singles Chart in April 1994.

In 1997, Deep Blue was one of several Moving Shadow artists which left the label to form their own imprint, Partisan Recordings.

O'Keeffe collaborated with Rob Haigh, who recorded for Moving Shadow as Omni Trio, to record a joint album under the pseudonym Black Rain in 2003, on a new label they created called Scale. In 2005, he released his first solo album for the label under the Deep Blue guise, entitled Metropolitan Chic.
