= Ring of Saturn (EP) =

EP by Goldie
- Released: 23 November 1998
- Recorded: England
- Length: 61:05
- Label: FFRR
- Producers: Goldie; Rob Playford

Goldie chronology
Saturnz Return (1998)	Ring of Saturn (1998)	The Journey Man (2017)

Professional ratings
Review scores
Source	Rating
AllMusic	4/5 stars
Muzik	4/5 stars
NME	7/10
Pitchfork	4.2/10

Ring of Saturn is an extended play by Goldie released on 23 November 1998.

== Track listing ==
All tracks are written by Goldie, except where noted.

No.	Title	Length
1.	"Mother VIP"	7:23
2.	"What You Won't Do for Love"	4:16
3.	"Hyena L"	5:40
4.	"Kaiser Salsek"	5:40
5.	"Judged by Colour, Heard by Sound, Seen by Blind"	6:28
6.	"Unkle"	5:08
7.	"What You Won't Do for Love" (Left Hand Man Mix)	6:01
8.	"What You Won't Do for Love" (Belief System Mix)	6:09
9.	"Temper, Temper" (Optical Remix)	7:17
10.	"Temper, Temper" (Grooverider Remix)	7:03
