= Walking Wounded =

Studio album by Everything but the Girl
- Released: 6 May 1996
- Recorded: 1995
- Studios: Little Joey's, London; Milo, London; Strongroom, London
- Genres: Downtempo; drum and bass; sophisti-pop; techno; trip hop
- Length: 52:18
- Labels: Virgin; Atlantic
- Producers: Ben Watt; Spring Heel Jack; Howie B; Todd Terry; Rob Haigh

Everything but the Girl chronology
Amplified Heart (1994)	Walking Wounded (1996)	Temperamental (1999)

Singles from Walking Wounded
- 1. "Walking Wounded" Released: 8 April 1996; 2. "Wrong" Released: 17 June 1996; 3. "Single" Released: 23 September 1996; 4. "Before Today" Released: 17 February 1997

Walking Wounded is the ninth studio album by English musical duo Everything but the Girl. It was released on 6 May 1996 and issued by Virgin Records and Atlantic Records. The album saw the duo adopting a more electronica-based style following the success of the remixed version of "Missing" from their previous album, Amplified Heart (1994).

Four tracks from this album were released as singles: the drum and bass-influenced "Walking Wounded", the house-influenced "Wrong" (both of which became top-ten hits on the UK Singles Chart), the downtempo track "Single" (which set Tracey Thorn's emotionally direct vocal against breakbeats, organ, and strings), and the drum-and-bass "Before Today". The album received critical praise, voted as the 12th-best album of the year in The Village Voice's Jazz & Jop critics' poll.

== Composition ==
According to Pitchfork's Ruth Saxelby, Walking Wounded draws on downtempo, drum and bass, and trip hop music, "compressing the wide open space of those then-nascent sounds into a pop format". AllMusic critic Stephen Thomas Erlewine wrote that the album is informed musically by trip hop and techno, albeit eschewing the "free-form song structures" traditionally associated with those genres. Treble writer Adam Blyweiss viewed it as a refinement of Everything but the Girl's earlier sophisti-pop sound that "replaced many of the duo's acoustics with reasonable digital facsimiles".

Walking Wounded marked a change in the duo's approach to writing songs. Ben Watt produced various instrumental tracks, while Tracey Thorn wrote lyrics after listening to the completed tracks. In producing the tracks, Watt utilised samples from "unusual" sources; the song "Single", for instance, sampled Tim Buckley's "Song to the Siren" and Stan Tracey's "Starless and Bible Black". Thorn later recalled: "We really believed in ourselves and that comes across in the sound. We'd finally got to the point where we realised what our strength was: the softness and warmth of my voice against urban beats; the warm and cold, the soft and hard contrast. We got it perfect on this record; it was our pop triumph."

== Release ==
Walking Wounded was released on 6 May 1996 by Virgin Records in Europe, and on 21 May 1996 by Atlantic Records in the United States. It reached number four on the UK Albums Chart, becoming the duo's highest-charting album in the United Kingdom until 2023's Fuse, and peaked at number 37 on the US Billboard 200. Four singles were released from Walking Wounded: "Walking Wounded" on 8 April 1996, "Wrong" on 17 June 1996, "Single" on 23 September 1996, and "Before Today" on 17 February 1997. By February 1997, the album had sold 750,000 copies worldwide, according to Billboard. It went on to sell over 1,300,000 copies worldwide.

Walking Wounded was reissued by Edsel Records as a two-disc deluxe set on 4 September 2015.

On 8 November 2019, the album was re-released on vinyl by Buzzin' Fly Records.

A 2CD reissue of Walking Wounded, mastered at Abbey Road Studios by Miles Showell, is set to release on 14 August 2026 via Chryalis.

== Critical reception ==
Professional ratings
Review scores
Source	Rating
AllMusic	4.5/5 stars
Chicago Tribune	3.5/4 stars
Entertainment Weekly	A
The Guardian	4/5 stars
Mojo	4/5 stars
NME	6/10
Pitchfork	6.6/10 (1996); 9.0/10 (2019)
Q	4/5 stars
Rolling Stone	4/5 stars
Spin	9/10

Writing for Entertainment Weekly, Jim Farber hailed the fusion of electronic and pop styles on Walking Wounded as "groundbreaking" and "at once abstract and immediate, untamed and accessible", while also crediting the "psychological resonance" of the lyrics for "putting EBTG way above the campiness of most neo-lounge acts." Johnny Huston of Spin found that the album's songs are rooted in a "messy intimacy" uncommon in pop music, and that Everything but the Girl's balancing of "tradition and experimentation" and "softness and bite" makes Walking Wounded "more interesting" than the purely instrumental work of the duo's collaborators. In The Guardian, Sheryl Garratt said that the duo had "intelligently" incorporated light drum and bass elements into their sound on an album she called "more a gentle updating" than "a reinvention". Andy Crysell was more ambivalent in NME, expressing disappointment that the record did not constitute an "all-out conversion" to electronic music, although finding its songs "well-crafted and no doubt spectacularly meaningful".

In his retrospective review for AllMusic, Stephen Thomas Erlewine said that Everything but the Girl, being "at its core ... a pop group", had in a sense "dilute[d]" trip hop and techno by adhering to pop song structures on Walking Wounded, yet they "found a way around that by seamlessly incorporating the rhythms into carefully crafted songs." For Pitchfork, Ruth Saxelby discussed Walking Wounded in context with the rest of the group's oeuvre:

Each Everything but the Girl album has its own style and story, but the one on which Thorn and Watt's individual gifts shine brightest is the one on which they stripped everything back. They shared their knottiest feelings, created dialogue with skeletal new sounds, and made the record in a much more insular way than they ever had previously. Its timely sonics and emotionally wrought themes spoke as much to teenagers, myself included, as it did the band's adult contemporaries (Bristol drum 'n' bass head Roni Size gave it thumbs up).

Walking Wounded was included in the book 1001 Albums You Must Hear Before You Die.

== Track listing ==
Walking Wounded track listing
No.	Title	Lyrics	Music	Length
1.	"Before Today"	Ben Watt	Watt	4:18
2.	"Wrong"	Tracey Thorn	Watt	4:36
3.	"Single"	Thorn	Watt	4:38
4.	"The Heart Remains a Child"	Thorn	Thorn	3:50
5.	"Walking Wounded"	Watt	Ashley Wales; John Coxon	6:05
6.	"Flipside"	Watt	Watt	4:33
7.	"Big Deal"	Thorn	Watt	4:29
8.	"Mirrorball"	Thorn	Watt	3:27
9.	"Good Cop Bad Cop"	Thorn	Watt	4:54
10.	"Wrong" (Todd Terry remix)	Thorn	Watt	4:45
11.	"Walking Wounded" (Omni Trio remix)	Watt	Wales; Coxon	6:43
Total length:				52:18

Deluxe edition disc 1 track listing
No.	Title	Length
12.	"Corcovado"	3:54
13.	"Before Today" (live)	6:30
14.	"Single" (live)	4:51
15.	"Wrong" (live)	7:00
Total length:		74:33

Deluxe edition disc 2 track listing
No.	Title	Length
1.	"Mirrorball" (demo)	3:31
2.	"Flipside" (demo)	3:56
3.	"Above the Law" (demo)	4:24
4.	"Speeding Car Side On" (instrumental demo)	4:02
5.	"Walking Wounded" (Dave Wallace remix)	8:19
6.	"Wrong" (Mood II Swing dub)	8:54
7.	"Wrong" (Deep Dish remix)	4:03
8.	"Single" (Photek remix)	5:18
9.	"Single" (Brad Wood Memphis remix)	4:42
10.	"Before Today" (Nellee Hooper remix)	5:42
11.	"Before Today" (Adam F remix)	4:14
12.	"Before Today" (Chicane remix)	6:25
13.	"Before Today" (Dillinja remix)	4:57
14.	"Mirrorball" (DJ Jazzy Jeff Sole Full remix)	4:28
15.	"Corcovado" (Knee Deep Classic Club Mix Ben Watt vocal re-edit)	6:19
Total length:		79:14

== Personnel ==
Credits are adapted from the album's liner notes.

Everything but the Girl

- Tracey Thorn – vocals
- Ben Watt – acoustic guitar, vocals, abstract sounds, beats, synthesizer, production, programming, recording

Production

- Andy Bradfield – mixing
- Mads Bjerke – engineering on "Walking Wounded"
- Spring Heel Jack – mixing, production, and programming on "Walking Wounded"
- Howie B – co-production, programming, and scratching on "Flipside"
- Johnny Rockstar – additional programming on "Flipside"
- Jeremy Shaw – additional programming on "Flipside"
- Matthius H. – engineering on "Wrong" (Todd Terry remix)
- Todd Terry – additional production and remixing on "Wrong" (Todd Terry remix)
- Rob Haigh – engineering, additional production, and remixing on "Walking Wounded" (Omni Trio remix)

Design

- Everything but the Girl – design
- Jim Friedman – inner sleeve photography
- Form – design
- Marcelo Krasilcic – cover photography

== Charts ==
=== Weekly charts ===
Weekly chart performance for Walking Wounded
Chart (1996–1997)	Peak position
Australian Albums (ARIA)	11
Austrian Albums (Ö3 Austria)	50
Belgian Albums (Ultratop Flanders)	43
Canada Top Albums/CDs (RPM)	19
Dutch Albums (Album Top 100)	52
French Albums (SNEP)	48
German Albums (Offizielle Top 100)	59
New Zealand Albums (RMNZ)	18
Norwegian Albums (VG-lista)	40
Scottish Albums (Official Charts)	18
Swedish Albums (Sverigetopplistan)	6
Swiss Albums (Schweizer Hitparade)	33
UK Albums (Official Charts)	4
US Billboard 200	37
Chart (2019)	Peak position
UK Independent Albums (Official Charts)	33

=== Year-end charts ===
1996 year-end chart performance for Walking Wounded
Chart (1996)	Position
Swedish Albums (Sverigetopplistan)	92

== Certifications ==
Certifications for Walking Wounded
Region	Certification	Certified units/sales
Australia (ARIA)	Gold	35,000^{^}
New Zealand (RMNZ)	Gold	7,500^{^}
United Kingdom (BPI)	Platinum	300,000^{^}
^{^} Shipments figures based on certification alone.
