= The Deepest Cut Vol 1 =

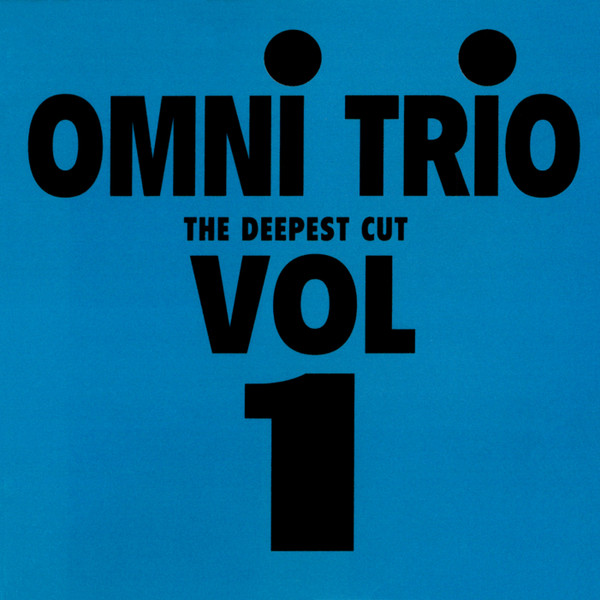

Studio album by Omni Trio
- Released: August 1995
- Studio: S.O.L. Studios, UK
- Genre: Downtempo, drum and bass, jungle
- Length: 70:12; 90:15 (Japanese Edition)
- Label: Moving Shadow (UK); Sm:)e Communications (US); Avex Trax (JPN)
- Producer: Robert Haigh

Omni Trio chronology
The Deepest Cut Vol 1 (1995)	The Haunted Science (1996)

American cover
- Artwork for the American edition of the album, titled Music For The New Millennium

Professional ratings
Review scores
Source	Rating
Allmusic	4.5/5 stars

The Deepest Cut Vol 1 is the first full-length album by Robert Haigh recorded under his Omni Trio moniker, released in 1995 through the Moving Shadow label. The album was released in the United States under the title Music For The New Millennium with different artwork the same year. The Japanese Avex Trax edition of the album, titled The Deepest Cut, also included unique artwork as well as a bonus 3" CD with 4 extra tracks not included on the UK or US releases.

In 1998, Moving Shadow reissued the album on CD format with a slightly different track listing that includes the bonus track "Torn".

== Track listing ==
All tracks are written by Robert Haigh.

No.	Title	Length
1.	"Renegade Snares" (Foul Play VIP Mix)	6:39
2.	"Living For The Future" (FBD Project VIP Mix)	6:20
3.	"Rollin' Heights" (More Strings Attached Mix)	5:27
4.	"Mainline" ('95 Lick)	5:46
5.	"Thru The Vibe"	6:02
6.	"Together"	5:37
7.	"Renegade Snares" (Rob's Reconstruction Mix)	5:33
8.	"Shadowplay"	5:17
9.	"Alien Creed"	5:32
10.	"Feel Good" (Original In Demand Mix)	5:01
11.	"Living For The Future" (Original Mix)	6:38
12.	"Soul Promenade" (Nookie Remix)	6:20
Total length:		70:12

Japanese Bonus 3" CD
No.	Title	Length
1.	"Stronger"	5:49
2.	"Future Frontier"	5:55
3.	"Original Soundtrack"	4:08
4.	"Ghost Rider"	4:11
Total length:		20:03

== Release history ==
Region	Date	Label	Format	Catalog
United Kingdom	1995	Moving Shadow	CD, 2xLP	ASHADOW 1
United States	1995	Sm:)e Communications	CD, 2xLP, CS	SM-8012-1
Japan	1995	Avex Trax	CD	AVCD-11303
United Kingdom	1998	Moving Shadow	CD	ASHADOW 1DX
