= The Journey Man =

Studio album by Goldie
- Released: 16 June 2017
- Studio: Battery Studios, London; The Tree House, Kamala Beach, Phuket
- Genre: Drum and bass; acid jazz; trip hop
- Length: 108:45
- Label: Metalheadz; Cooking Vinyl
- Producer: Goldie; Jon Dixon

Goldie chronology
Ring of Saturn (1998)	The Journey Man (2017)

Singles from The Journey Man
- 1. "I Adore You" Released: 22 April 2017

The Journey Man is the third studio album by English drum and bass artist Goldie. Released nearly two decades after his previous studio album, Saturnz Return, The Journey Man has been described by Goldie as his magnum opus and his legacy album, taking five years to produce. The album features a number of collaborators, including vocalist and songwriter Natalie Duncan, Terri Walker, Jose James, and Goldie's wife, Mika Wassenaar Price.

The album spent one week on the UK Albums Chart at number 43.

== Background ==
Following the critical success of his debut album, Timeless (1995), and the more subdued reaction to its follow-up, Saturnz Return (1998), Goldie's focus moved from studio album production to DJing, acting, art, and appearances on celebrity television shows. This experience, including his appearance on the BBC's Maestro television series, led Goldie to reprise Timeless at the Royal Festival Hall with the Heritage Orchestra in 2015. It was during this process that the idea for The Journey Man began to germinate.

== Critical reception ==
Professional ratings
Aggregate scores
Source	Rating
Metacritic	65/100
Review scores
Source	Rating
AllMusic	3.5/5 stars
The Arts Desk	4/5 stars
Clash	8/10
Exclaim!	8/10
The Guardian	2/5 stars
The Line of Best Fit	8/10
Mixmag	8/10
Mojo	3/5 stars
Q	3/5 stars
Uncut	8/10

The Journey Man received generally positive reviews from critics. Erik Thompson of The Line of Best Fit praises Goldie for managing "to craft a sprawling, nearly two-hour collection that sounds vital and inspired, while also delivering a fresh twist on the euphoric drum ‘n’ bass club anthems that he'll always be known for."

Reviewing for AllMusic, Paul Simpson notes that The Journey Man spans genres; "As with his '90s masterworks, Goldie has created a widescreen epic that tells the story of his life through music, not only via drum'n'bass but spanning other genres such as soul, jazz, and downtempo. In addition to club-friendly drum'n'bass tracks such as the vibrant "Prism" and the darker, Photek-like "I Think of You," there are loads of tracks that do without fast, complex breakbeats."

Will Hodgkinson, writing for The Times, tempered his praise for the album, saying "Goldie's creativity and ambition is inspiring and the cinematic scale of his music uplifting, but this isn't hugely different from the material of his mid-nineties success".

The album was reviewed less favourably by The Guardian; with Ben Beaumont-Thomas citing Goldie's inability to corral his larger than life ambition as cause for what feels like some interminable material; with the 18-minute track "Redemption" the place this is most evident.

== Track listing ==
All tracks are written by Goldie, except where noted.

No.	Title	Writer(s)	Length
1.	"Horizon"	Goldie; Jon Dixon	7:08
2.	"Prism"		6:07
3.	"Mountains"		5:14
4.	"Castaway"		4:30
5.	"The Mirrored River"		5:51
6.	"I Adore You"	Goldie; Ulterior Motive	6:06
7.	"I Think of You"		7:12
8.	"Truth"		4:59
9.	"Redemption"		18:36
10.	"Tu Viens Avec Moi?"	Pat Metheny	8:49
11.	"The Ballad Celeste"		5:12
12.	"This Is Not a Love Song"	Goldie; Jon Dixon	6:35
13.	"The River Mirrored"		5:51
14.	"Triangle"		5:51
15.	"Tomorrow's Not Today"	Goldie; Jon Dixon; Naomi Pryor	4:36
16.	"Run, Run, Run"	Goldie; Jon Dixon	6:08

== Charts ==
Chart performance for The Journey Man
Chart (2017)	Peak position
UK Albums Chart	43
