= Angel (Goldie song) =

Single by Goldie

from the album Timeless
- Released: Fall 1995
- Genre: Intelligent drum and bass
- Length: 4:59 (album version); 4:12 (radio edit)
- Label: FFRR
- Songwriter(s): Goldie
- Producer(s): Goldie

Goldie singles chronology
"Inner City Life" (1994)	"Angel" (1995)	"State of Mind" (1996)

"Angel" is a song by English musician Goldie, released in 1995 as second single from his debut album, Timeless (1995). The song was originally published as a single in 1993 by British label Synthetic Records and credited to Goldie's moniker "Metalheads". The subsequent re-release reached number 41 on the UK Singles Chart on 9 September 1995. The song features vocals from Goldie's frequent collaborator Diane Charlemagne. While "Angel" uses time stretching sample technique and soul vocals, its remixed version "Saint Angel" is more hardcore techno-influenced. It was released both on "Angel" single and album Timeless.

== Critical reception ==
Everett True from Melody Maker named the song Single of the Week, writing, "Sounds like he got the whole f***in' world locked in there, sweltering behind his ever-fidgeting groove, useless, trapped underneath any number of multi-storey skyscrapers and overheated car parks. Sounds like he's got some sweet soul angel trapped there, fighting to break free at the garbage piles and ghetto blasters, soaring unfettered for a moment, only to fall shattered to earth. Sounds like he's been yearning to soundtrack this summer, all the dirty street days and humid sleepless nights, all the hardcore fantasies and dubwise realities. Seems like Goldie ain't just an arch manipulator, a dab hand with a fast beat and a set of dental pliers, but like he's got soul."

Music & Media commented, "Now that jungle has taken the clubs and charts by storm, British artist Goldie has re-released 1993's "Angel", a slow hypnotic track featuring singer Diane Charlemagne (Urban Cookie Collective)." Music Week rated it three out of five, adding, "In the same vein as "Inner City Life", this is not the most commercial jungle track around, but is mellow enough to appeal to beginners. An authentic introduction to the genre and a booster for Goldie's recently-released debut album Timeless." Rupert Howe from NME named it Symphony for the Devil Single of the Week, writing, "Consider 'Angel'. If this was an ambient record it would meander softly in a vaguely 'celestial' manner before whimpering into silence. Instead you get a searingly personal take on the nu-junglist school of strings'n'breakbeats that starts out all breathless and soulful, descends headlong into a maelstrom of sinister synth stabs and spiked marching drums, only to emerge just as divinely harmonious and sensuously funky as before. Majestic."

== Track listing ==
1. "Angel" (album version) – 4:59
2. "Saint Angel" (original mix) – 4:29
3. "Angel" (Peshay Back from Narm mix) – 9:06

Some versions do not include third track or include album version of "Saint Angel" as fourth track.

== Personnel ==
- Design, CGI artist – Sam
- Design concept, art direction – Goldie
- Management – N.U.R. Entertainment, Trenton Harrison
- Writing, production – Goldie
- Co-production – Rob Playford, Mark Mac and Dego (4hero).
- Vocals – Diane Charlemagne

== Charts ==
Chart performance for "Angel"
Chart (1995)	Peak position
UK Singles (OCC)	41
