= The Haunted Science =

Studio album by Omni Trio
- Released: August 12, 1996
- Length: 53:05; 72:30 (CD editions)
- Label: Moving Shadow
- Producer: Robert Haigh

Omni Trio chronology
The Deepest Cut Vol 1 (1995)	The Haunted Science (1996)	Skeleton Keys (1997)

American cover
- Artwork for the American edition of the album

Professional ratings
Review scores
Source	Rating
Allmusic	4/5 stars

The Haunted Science is the second album released by Omni Trio, the drum and bass moniker of English producer Robert Haigh. Similar to its predecessor The Deepest Cut, the album was first issued through the label Moving Shadow in the UK, then released in the US through Sm:)e Communications with new artwork, and then issued through Avex Trax in Japan with a bonus mini CD that contains four bonus tracks and new art. The Moving Shadow double LP lacks the alternative mixes of "Trippin' On Broken Beats", "Nu Birth Of Cool", and "Who Are You?" Those three tracks were also previously released as 12" singles.

The booking agency Haunted Science took their name from this album.

== Track listing ==
All tracks are written by Robert Haigh.

No.	Title	Length
1.	"Astral Phase"	6:36
2.	"Nu Birth Of Cool" (Rouge Unit Mix)	6:29
3.	"Rhythm Methods"	7:07
4.	"Haunted Kind"	5:36
5.	"Trippin' On Broken Beats" (Carlito Mix)	6:34
6.	"Who Are You?" (Aqua Sky Mix)	7:45
7.	"The Elemental"	6:42
8.	"Serpent Navigators"	6:16
Total length:		53:05

CD bonus tracks
No.	Title	Length
9.	"Trippin' On Broken Beats" (Alternative Take)	7:07
10.	"Nu Birth Of Cool" (Original 12" Mix)	6:03
11.	"Who Are You?" (Original 12" Mix)	6:44
Total length:		72:12

Japanese Bonus 3" CD
No.	Title	Length
1.	"Soul Of Darkness"	2:09
2.	"Feel Good '95"	4:39
3.	"Torn"	6:18
4.	"Together" (Remix)	6:42
Total length:		19:48

== Release history ==
Region	Date	Label	Format	Catalog
United Kingdom	1996	Moving Shadow	CD, 2xLP, CS	ASHADOW 6
United States	1996	Sm:)e Communications	CD	SM-8024-2
Japan	1996	Avex Trax	CD	AVCD-11468
