= Change or Die =

Change or Die may refer to

- "Change or Die", a song by Papa Roach from the album Metamorphosis
- "Change or Die", a story from the comic book series Stormwatch

== See also ==
- Adapt or Die (disambiguation)
