= Goldie =

British DJ and producer (born 1965)

Goldie MBE
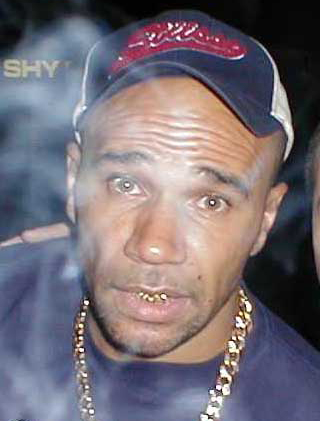
- Goldie in 2003
- Born: Clifford Joseph Price; 19 September 1965 (age 61); Walsall, England
- Occupations: Music producer; DJ; artist; actor
- Years active: 1991–present
- Spouses: Sonjia Ashby (m. 2002; div. 2005); Mika Wassenaar (m. 2010)
- Children: 5
- Musical career
- Also known as: Rufige Kru; Metalheads
- Genres: Electronic; jungle; breakbeat hardcore; drum and bass; darkcore
- Labels: Metalheadz; FFRR; Razor's Edge; Reinforced Records; Moving Shadow
- Website: goldie.co.uk

Clifford Joseph Price (born 19 September 1965), known professionally as Goldie, is an English music producer, DJ, graffiti artist and actor.

Initially gaining exposure for his work as a graffiti artist, Goldie became well known for his pioneering role as a musician in the 1990s UK jungle, drum and bass and breakbeat hardcore scenes. He released a variety of singles as Rufige Kru and Metalheads and co-founded the label Metalheadz. He later released several albums under his own name, including the 1995 album Timeless, which entered the UK charts at number 7.

Goldie's acting credits include the James Bond film The World Is Not Enough, Guy Ritchie's Snatch, and the BBC soap opera EastEnders.

== Early life ==
Born in Walsall, England, but raised in Wolverhampton, Price is of Jamaican and Scottish heritage. He was put up for adoption at the age of three, and raised in childcare homes and by several foster parents. According to his 2002 autobiography, he was physically and sexually abused during this time. Price was a member of the breakdance crew Westside, based in the Whitmore Reans and Heath Town areas of Wolverhampton, in the 1980s. He later joined a breakdance crew called the Birmingham Bboys, and made his name as a graffiti artist in the West Midlands.

His artwork around Birmingham and Wolverhampton was featured heavily in Dick Fontaine's documentary Bombin'. He is mentioned for his graffiti in the book Spraycan Art by Henry Chalfant and James Prigoff, which contains several examples of his art.

He moved to the United States owing to graffiti projects, and also started selling grills (gold teeth jewellery) in New York and Miami; he continued this business after his return to the UK in 1988. His nickname stems from "Goldielocks", an earlier nickname given to him during his Bboys days and subsequently shortened when he no longer wore dreadlocks.

== Career ==
=== Music ===
By 1991, Price had discovered the British breakbeat music scene when his girlfriend, DJ Kemistry, introduced him to the pioneering jungle and drum and bass producers Dennis "Dego" McFarlane and Mark "Marc Mac" Clair, known as 4hero. He went on to execute some design and A&R work for 4hero's Reinforced Records label.

In 1992, Price made his first record appearance by contributing to an EP by Icelandic group Ajax Project that included the track Ruffige.

His releases Killa Muffin b/w Krisp Biscuit and the Dark Rider EP were released under the "Rufige Kru" (Note: Talking about how he used various sounds—"throwing nu-skool samples against old-skool stuff and then pull[ing] other things in"—Goldie explained the word "rufige" was "the way you describe things that were left lying around on the surface—more or less scum", and said what he was doing was "collect[ing rufige] together and turn[ing it] into something new".) name. The track "Terminator", released under the name "Metalheads" in 1992, was a pivotal darkcore release and is noted for its use of pitch shifting. In late 1993, this was followed up with Angel/You and Me, and the release of Internal Affairs, a collaboration between Price and 4hero with vocals from Diane Charlemagne.

1994 saw him setting up his own record label, Metalheadz.

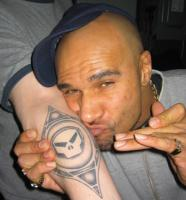
Goldie next to a "Metalheadz" tattoo, 2001

His first studio album, Timeless, followed in 1995. Timeless entered the UK Albums Chart at number seven. The album fused the breakbeats and basslines common in jungle with orchestral textures and soul vocals by Diane Charlemagne. The album's title track was a 21-minute symphonic piece. "Inner City Life", a track from the album, reached number 39 in the UK Singles Chart. Timeless helped to popularise drum and bass as a form of musical expression. The music critic Simon Reynolds noted that Price's credentials as a musical innovator—and particularly as one of the key driving forces of innovation in the jungle/breakbeat scene—were exceptional. "Goldie revolutionised jungle not once but thrice", he noted in The Wire magazine, continuing, "First there was 'Terminator' (pioneering the use of time stretching), then 'Angel' (fusing Diane Charlemagne's live vocal with David Byrne/Brian Eno samples to prove that hardcore could be more 'conventionally' musical), now there's 'Timeless', a 22-minute hardcore symphony."

In 1996, he released the Toasted Both Sides Please remix of the Bush song "Swallowed", which topped charts in the US and Canada.

Price released his second album, Saturnz Return, in 1998. The album's opening track, "Mother", is an hour-long orchestral drum and bass piece. The album featured appearances by David Bowie, Noel Gallagher and KRS-One. The album met with mixed reviews. David Brown of Entertainment Weekly called the album "ambitious but monotonous and overlong—Pink Floyd with a gold tooth".

In 2002, Price said that he had been working for three years on a film called Sine Tempus, described as a coming-of-age story of a young paintbrush artist. In 2006, he announced the soundtrack as his new album. The album was released via the Metalheadz website in 2008, but the film has not been released.

His Rufige Kru project has enlisted a number of producers and engineers to work in collaboration with over time. These have included Mark Rutherford, Rob Playford, Technical Itch, Heist, Cujo, Danny J, Doc Scott and Agzilla da Ice.

March 2013 saw the release of The Alchemist: The Best of Goldie 1992–2012, featuring prominent tracks from throughout Price's musical career. A subsequent compilation, the three-CD Masterpiece set released by Ministry of Sound in 2014, brought together tracks that influenced him (Soul II Soul's "Back To Life", Roy Ayers' "Everybody Loves The Sunshine") with cuts that soundtracked his entry into the rave scene and key moments from the drum'n'bass scene.

In 2017, the Goldie album The Journey Man was released, which Price described as his "magnum opus" and "the most important thing that I've ever made."

In 2020, Goldie launched his new record label, Fallen Tree 1Hundred.

A 25th anniversary edition of Timeless was released by London Records the following year. The new release included a triple gold vinyl version and a compact disc version.

=== Television and film ===
Price has appeared in numerous television shows and programmes, including Celebrity Big Brother, Bravo TV's The World's Deadliest Gangs, Passengers, and as gangster Angel Hudson in the British soap opera EastEnders between 2001 and 2002.

In film, he has appeared in Everybody Loves Sunshine and the James Bond film, The World Is Not Enough in 1999, and Guy Ritchie's Snatch in 2000.

His earliest television appearances were in 1987, appearing in BBC1's Daytime Live in October 1987 to discuss the rise of urban art across the United Kingdom, Central Weekend, a Friday evening topical debate show on Central TV, promoting graffiti as an art form, and Central TV's Here and Now programme featuring Pogus Caesar's photographs of New York.

In June 2008, Price participated in the German/French TV channel ARTEs format 'Into the Night with ...' episode 052, where he met artist Skream. The episode not only shows an adventurous encounter between two hard-drinking stars of the club scene, but also a close-up look at the operation of one of Europe's most important electro festivals, the Melt Festival.

During August and September 2008, the BBC broadcast Maestro, a reality television show in which eight celebrities learned to conduct a concert orchestra, Price placed second.

As a result of Maestro, he appeared in the programme Classic Goldie in July 2009, learning how to write a score for a large orchestra and choir. The resulting composition, commissioned by the BBC and entitled Sine Tempore (Timeless), was performed at two children's Promenade concerts in the Royal Albert Hall on 1 and 2 August 2009, which featured music connected with Charles Darwin and the creation and evolution of the world.

On 26 March 2011, he appeared in a three-part reality television series, Goldie's Band: By Royal Appointment in which he led a group of music experts as they conducted a nationwide search for young talented musicians and then selected and coached 12 of them, who collaborated to create some musical pieces for a performance at Buckingham Palace.

In December 2020, Price presented the Sky Arts programme Goldie: The Art That Made Me covering influential graffiti and street art.

=== Art ===
In 2007, Price returned to the art world with an art exhibition, "Love Over Gold", which was held at the Leonard Street Gallery, London. In 2008, he teamed up with Pete Tong to provide much of the artwork for Tong's new Wonderland club night at Eden nightclub in San Antonio, Ibiza.

There was an exhibition of Price's art in Berlin from 13 to 26 June 2008. In April 2009, a retrospective exhibition titled "Kids Are All Riot" took place in Shoreditch, London, coinciding with the release of his screenprint "Apocalypse Angel".

Around 2008, Price's art work was displayed on the London Underground by the arts company Art Below.

In 2021, he modelled for Louis Vuitton Menswear Spring / Summer collection and contributed a song.

=== Books ===
The innovative nature of Goldie's art (both sonic and visual) was a consistent theme in Kodwo Eshun's acclaimed book 'More Brilliant Than The Sun' (published in 1998) which has long been seen as a landmark text on Afro-futurism. Among the works that Eshun referenced were Goldie's 1986 graffiti piece Future World Machine and his 1992 single 'Terminator'. Noting the links between the multi-dimensionality in both painting and sound, Eshun noted: "There's a big interface between graffiti and the break."

In 2002, Goldie's autobiography 'Nine Lives' was published by Hodder & Stoughton. Written with London-based writer Paul Gorman, the book traced his life story from childhood in care and foster homes through to the first flush of his success as a groundbreaking musical artist.

A second autobiography 'All Things Remembered' was published in November 2017 by Faber & Faber. Written when Goldie was 52, it covers a more comprehensive span than the earlier book but is more philosophic in tone. While incidents from his extraordinary childhood are recounted, it also includes his ruminations on musical heroes such as Pat Metheny and a conversation with "my left-hand man" Doc Scott as well as memories of his work in TV and film. The book includes pictures of Goldie on set with David Bowie. Co-written with Ben Thompson, 'All Things Remembered' was chosen by Nicola Barker as one of The Guardian's Books Of The Year. She described it as "a fabulous, whirling kaleidoscope of music, memory and trauma . . . magical and cautionary."

== Personal life ==
In the early 1990s, Price had a relationship with drum and bass artist Kemistry, who died in a car accident in 1999, and was romantically involved with Icelandic singer Björk in the mid-1990s.

In 1998, Price bought a country house in Bovingdon, Hertfordshire.

Price married model Sonjia Ashby in 2002. They divorced in 2005.

In 2007, Goldie began a relationship with Mika Wassenaar, a Canadian. The couple appeared in the 20 June 2009 episode of ITV's All Star Mr & Mrs with Phillip Schofield and Fern Britton. Mika and Price married in 2010.

On 29 April 2010, Price opened the William Tyndale Primary School Sports Pitch in Islington, London.

In July 2010, Price received an honorary doctorate in Social Sciences from Brunel University, Uxbridge. On 3 September 2010, he received an honorary degree of Doctor of Design from the University of Wolverhampton.

Price and his wife Mika moved to Thailand in 2015.

Price was appointed a Member of the Order of the British Empire (MBE) in the 2016 New Year Honours awards, for services to music and young people.

Price was accused of assaulting a security guard at the 2017 Glastonbury festival after the guard had refused to let Price's daughter backstage; Price later emailed a response which read, "Yep, guilty as charged". District judge Lynn Matthews at Bristol Magistrates' Court rejected Price's unorthodox emailed response and in a video call in March 2018, Price admitted to assault, resulting being ordered to pay almost £2,500 in fines.

Price has five children, including Danny and Jamie, who was sentenced to life imprisonment for murder in 2010.

== Discography ==
=== Albums ===
Studio albums

- Timeless (1995)
- Saturnz Return (1998)
- The Journey Man (2017)

as Rufige Kru

- Malice in Wonderland (2007)
- Memoirs of an Afterlife (2009)
- Alpha Omega (2025)

Soundtrack albums

- Sine Tempus – The Soundtrack (2008)

Collaboration albums

- Subject One – Music for Inanimate Objects (2019) with James Davidson as Subjective
- The Start of No Regret (2022) with James Davidson as Subjective

=== Selected singles/EPs ===
- "Kris Biscuit / Killer Muffin" (as Rufige Cru) (Reinforced Records, 1992)
- Darkrider EP (as Rufige Cru) (Reinforced Records, 1992)
- Terminator EP (as Metal Heads) (Synthetic Hardcore Phonography, 1992)
- "Ghosts of My Life / Terminator 2" (as Rufige Kru) (Reinforced Records, 1993)
- "Angel / You and Me" (as Metal Heads) (Synthetic Hardcore Phonography, 1993)
- Internal Affairs EP (as Internal Affairs with 4hero) (Reinforced Records, 1993)
- "VIP Riders Ghost" (as Rufige Kru) (Metalheadz, 1993)
- "Inner City Life" (as Goldie presents Metalheadz) (FFRR, 1994) – UK No. 39 (UK Singles Chart)
- "Angel" (FFRR, 1995) – UK No. 41
- "Jah / Deadly Deep Subs" (Remixes) (Razors Edge, 1996)
- "State of Mind" (FFRR, 1996)
- "Digital" (feat. KRS-One) (FFRR, 1997) – UK No. 13
- "The Shadow" (as Rob & Goldie) (Moving Shadow, 1997) – UK No. 82
- "Kemistry V.I.P. / Your Sound" (Remixes) (Razors Edge, 1997)
- Ring of Saturn (FFRR, 1998)
- "Temper Temper" (featuring Noel Gallagher) (FFRR, 1998) – UK No. 13
- "Believe" (FFRR, 1998) – UK No. 36
- "Beachdrifta / Stormtrooper VIP" (Metalheadz, 2001)
- "Say You Love Me" (Metalheadz, 2005)
- "Monkey Boy / Special Request" (Metalheadz, 2007)
- "Vanilla" (Metalheadz, 2007)
- "Freedom" (feat. Natalie Duncan) (Metalheadz, 2012)
- "I Adore You" feat. Ulterior Motive (2017)
- "Upstart" feat. Skepta (2018)
- "Breakout" feat. LaMeduza (as Subjective) (2022)

=== Selected mixes ===
- INCredible Sound of Drum'n'Bass (1999)
- Goldie.co.uk (2001)
- MDZ.04 (2004)
- Drum & Bass Arena: The Classics (2006)
- Watch the Ride (2008)
- FabricLive.58 (2011)

== Filmography ==
- Everybody Loves Sunshine (1999) – Terry
- The World Is Not Enough (1999) – Mr. Bullion
- Snatch (2000) – Bad Boy Lincoln
- The Price of Air (2000) – The Greaser
- The Case (2002) – DJ Gabriel
