= Temperamental =

Temperamental may refer to:

- Temperamental (Everything but the Girl album)
- Temperamental (Divinyls album)
- The Temperamentals, a 2009 play about the founding of the Mattachine Society
