= Foul Play (group) =

British jungle group

- From left to right: Steve Gurley, Steve Bradshaw and John Morrow

Background information
- Origin: Northampton, England
- Genres: Jungle; Breakbeat hardcore; Drum and bass
- Years active: 1991–1998
- Labels: Moving Shadow, Oblivion
- Past members: Steve Bradshaw; John Morrow; Steve Gurley

Foul Play were an English jungle group formed in Northampton in 1991 by Steve Bradshaw, John Morrow and Steve Gurley.

== History ==
Foul Play was formed in Northampton, England, in 1991 by John Morrow, Steve Bradshaw and Steve Gurley. The group emerged during the transition from breakbeat hardcore to jungle and became known for combining uplifting rave melodies with increasingly complex breakbeats.

The trio began releasing records in 1992 on their own imprint, Oblivion Records, issuing the EPs Vol. 1 and Vol. 2. In 1993 they signed to the independent drum and bass label Moving Shadow and released the single "Finest Illusion" through the label's Section 5 subsidiary. The record became one of the group's best-known releases, although its original version was withdrawn because of an uncleared sample and later reissued in an amended form.

During their time with Moving Shadow, Foul Play released a series of influential EPs including Vol III (1993) and Vol 4 (1994), featuring tracks such as "Open Your Mind", "Being With You" and "Music Is the Key". They also became known for remixes including versions of Omni Trio's "Renegade Snares" and Hyper On Experience's "Lords of the Null Lines".

In 1994, Gurley left the group to pursue solo projects, including releases under the alias Rogue Unit. Morrow and Bradshaw continued as a duo and released Suspected in 1995, one of the earliest artist albums issued by Moving Shadow. The pair subsequently established Panik Records and released additional material between 1996 and 1997.

Foul Play ceased activity in 1998 following the death of Steve Bradshaw from multiple sclerosis. Afterwards, Morrow formed Foul Play Productions with Neil Shepherd and vocalist Shereen Ingram, releasing new material under the related name.

== Legacy ==
Foul Play are regarded as contributors to the development of early jungle and drum and bass during the genre's formative period in the early 1990s. Their releases on the Moving Shadow label, including "Open Your Mind" and "Finest Illusion", helped establish the melodic and atmospheric style that emerged alongside the darker sounds of early jungle.

The group were among a number of artists associated with Moving Shadow, a label described as one of the most influential imprints in the history of jungle and drum and bass. Music journalist Simon Reynolds identified Foul Play as well as label-mates including Omni Trio as key figures in the evolution of intelligent and atmospheric forms of jungle during the mid-1990s.

Retrospectives of the jungle era have continued to cite Foul Play's recordings among notable releases from the genre's formative years, particularly for their combination of breakbeat-driven rhythms with melodic and soulful sampling techniques.

== Discography ==
=== Studio albums ===
- Suspected (1995, Moving Shadow)

=== Compilation albums ===
- Origins (2020, Sneaker Social Club)

=== EPs ===
- Vol. 1 (1992, Oblivion Records)
- Vol. 2 (1992, Oblivion Records)
- Vol III (1993, Moving Shadow)
- Vol 4 (1994, Moving Shadow)
- Volume V (1995, Moving Shadow)

=== Singles and notable releases ===
- "Finest Illusion" (1993, Moving Shadow / Section 5)
- "Open Your Mind" (1993, Moving Shadow)
- "Being with You" / "Music Is the Key" (1994, Moving Shadow)
- "Stepper" / "Total Control" (1995, Moving Shadow)
- "Vice" / "Karma Pt. 1 & 2" (1996, Moving Shadow)

=== Remixes (selected) ===
- Nookie - "Sound of Music (Foul Play Remix)"
- Omni Trio - "Feel Better (Foul Play Remix)"
- Omni Trio – "Renegade Snares (Foul Play Remix)"
- Hyper-On Experience – "Lords of the Null Lines (Foul Play Remix)"
- DJ Pulse - "Stay Calm (Foul Play Remix)"
- E-Z Rollers - "Believe (Foul Play Remix)"
