= Weekend World (album) =

Studio album by E-Z Rollers
- Released: May 11, 1998
- Recorded: 1997–98
- Genre: Drum and bass, liquid funk
- Label: Moving Shadow, EMI
- Producer: Jay Hurren, Alex Banks

E-Z Rollers chronology
Dimensions of Sound (1996)	Weekend World (1998)	Titles of the Unexpected (2003)

Professional ratings
Review scores
Source	Rating
Allmusic	4/5 stars

Weekend World is the British drum and bass group E-Z Rollers' second album. It was released in 1998. In 1999, the album was re-released with two bonus tracks and slightly altered track listing and cover art. The song "Short Change" was used as the main menu music for the 1999 game Grand Theft Auto 2. The songs "Soundclash" and "Retro" were both used in the 1998 video game Toca 2: Touring Cars. "Soundclash" played in a shortcut cutscene before the game started and "Retro" was the main menu music.

== 1998 Track listing ==
1. "Hang On"
2. "Soundclash"
3. "Hip to the Game"
4. "Cop Theme"
5. "Tough at the Top"
6. "A Word from Dave"
7. "Nightfall"
8. "Movin' On"
9. "Diff Step"
10. "Rhode Trip"
11. "Short Change"
12. "Funked Up Flavas"
13. "Retro"
14. "Walk This Land (Remix)"
15. "Tribe"
16. "Weekend World"
17. "Synesthesia"

== 1999 Track listing ==
1. "Walk This Land (Edit)"
2. "Hang On"
3. "Soundclash ('99 Edit)"
4. "Hip to the Game"
5. "Cop Theme"
6. "Tough at the Top"
7. "A Word from Dave"
8. "Nightfall"
9. "Movin' On"
10. "Diff Step"
11. "Rhode Trip"
12. "Short Change"
13. "Funked Up Flavas"
14. "Retro (Vocal Edit)"
15. "Walk This Land (Smoking Barrel Mix)"
16. "Weekend World"
17. "Focus"
18. "Synesthesia"
19. "Tough at the Top (Origin Unknown Remix)"

The 1999 release shifts the whole track list up one and inserts "Walk This Land (Edit)" as the first track, "Focus" and a remix of "Tough at the Top" by Origin Unknown at the end, and omits the song "Tribe" entirely. "Soundclash" is shortened by approximately 47 seconds and labelled as the "'99 Edit". "Retro" is replaced by the Vocal Edit, which was originally released on a single in 1997. It is approximately 1 minute and 34 seconds shorter than the 1998 album version. The track "Walk This Land (Smoking Barrel Mix)" is identical to the mix from the 1998 release. "Walk This Land (Edit)" was featured in the Guy Ritchie film "Lock, Stock and Two Smoking Barrels".
