= Digital (Goldie song) =

Single by Goldie featuring KRS-One

from the album Saturnz Return
- Released: 13 October 1997
- Genre: Drum and bass; speed garage; hip hop
- Length: 5:51 (album edit)
- Label: FFRR
- Songwriters: Goldie; KRS-One; L. Parker; Rob Playford
- Producers: Goldie; Rob Playford

Goldie singles chronology
"The Shadow" (1997)	"Digital" (1997)	"Shadow 100" (1997)

KRS-One singles chronology
"Men of Steel" (1997)	"Digital" (1997)	"5 Boroughs" (1998)

"Digital" is a song by English musician Goldie featuring American rapper KRS-One, released as the first single from Goldie's 1998 album Saturnz Return.

It reached number 13 on the UK Singles Chart on 1 November 1997 which is his highest-charting single along with "Temper Temper" (featuring Noel Gallagher). The single is influenced by then-emerging speed garage and one of the first attempts to blend drum and bass with rap. It samples "This Cut's Got Flavor" by Latee and "I'm Still #1" by Boogie Down Productions and was itself sampled in "Answers" by Lootpack featuring Quasimoto and "Sound of the Culture" by DJ Munja. "Digital" received mixed reviews from music critics even those favourable of the album like Ryan Schreiber from Pitchfork.

== Track listing ==
1. "Digital" (Armand van Helden's speed garage mix) – 9:12
2. "Digital" (DJ Muggs mix) – 4:29
3. "Digital" (Boymerang mix) – 8:36
4. "Digital" (original mix) – 5:54

== Personnel ==
- Design – Goldie, Jon Black, Sam Bennett
- Engineering – Rob Playford
- Rap – KRS-One
- Photography – Phil Knott
- Producing – Goldie, Rob Playford
- Writing – Goldie, KRS-One, L. Parker, Rob Playford

== Charts ==
Chart performance for "Digital"
Chart (1997–1998)	Peak position
New Zealand (Recorded Music NZ)	43
Sweden (Sverigetopplistan)	35
UK Singles (Official Charts)	13
