= Adapt or Die: Ten Years of Remixes =

Remix album by Everything but the Girl
- Released: 14 March 2005
- Recorded: 1990–2005
- Genre: House; drum and bass; downtempo
- Length: 77:18
- Label: Atlantic (US); Virgin (Europe)

Everything but the Girl chronology
Like the Deserts Miss the Rain (2003)	Adapt or Die: Ten Years of Remixes (2005)	Fuse (2023)

Professional ratings
Review scores
Source	Rating
AllMusic	4/5 stars

Adapt or Die: Ten Years of Remixes is a remix album released by Everything but the Girl in 2005. It peaked at #9 in the Billboard Top Dance/Electronic Albums chart.

== Track listing ==
No.	Title	Year	Length
1.	"Mirrorball" (DJ Jazzy Jeff Sole Full Remix)	2004	4:26
2.	"Before Today" (Adam F Remix)	1997	4:15
3.	"Missing" (CL McSpadden Unreleased Powerhouse Mix)	2002	6:16
4.	"Corcovado" (Knee Deep Remix / Ben Watt Vocal Re-Edit)	2004	6:20
5.	"Rollercoaster" (King Britt Scuba Mix)	2004	5:20
6.	"Downhill Racer" (Kenny Dope Mix)	2004	3:33
7.	"Single" (Brad Wood Memphis Remix)	1996	4:44
8.	"Walking Wounded" (Dave Wallace Remix)	1996	8:16
9.	"Five Fathoms" (Kevin Yost Everything and a Groove Mix / Ben Watt Edit)	1999	7:06
10.	"Lullaby of Clubland" (Jay "Sinister" Sealee Remix)	2004	6:48
11.	"Temperamental" (Pull Timewarp Remix)	1999	6:00
12.	"Blame" (Fabio Remix)	1999	6:07
13.	"Wrong" (Todd Terry Unreleased Freeze Mix)	1996	5:40
14.	"Driving" (Acoustic Mix)	1990	2:27
15.	"Mirrorball" (Jazzy Jeff Groovin' Remix [bonus track])		3:38
16.	"Rollercoaster" (King Britt Scuba Ambient Mix [bonus track])		5:22

== Charts ==
Chart performance for Adapt or Die: Ten Years of Remixes
Chart (2005)	Peak position
Australian Albums (ARIA)	128
US Top Dance/Electronic Albums (Billboard)	9
