= Byte Size Life =

Studio album by Omni Trio
- Released: 6 September 1999
- Studio: Mainland Studios, Suffolk, UK
- Genre: Drum & Bass, Neurofunk, Electronica
- Length: 64:46 (LP); 71:54 (CD)
- Label: Moving Shadow
- Producer: Robert Haigh

Omni Trio chronology
| Skeleton Keys (1997) | Byte Size Life (1999) | Even Angels Cast Shadows (2001) |

Professional ratings
Review scores
| Source | Rating |
|---|---|
| AllMusic | 4/5 stars |
| The Independent | Positive |

Byte Size Life is the fourth studio album released by Omni Trio, the drum and bass moniker of English electronic music producer Robert Haigh. The album was released on 6 September 1999 through Moving Shadow on compact disc and a limited edition 4-disc vinyl box set.

== Track listing ==
All tracks are written by Robert Haigh.

| No. | Title | Length |
|---|---|---|
| 1. | "Sound System" | 7:09 |
| 2. | "Byte Size Life" | 6:57 |
| 3. | "Assassins" | 6:22 |
| 4. | "Brother In Detroit" | 7:55 |
| 5. | "Meltdown" (Remix) | 7:04 |
| 6. | "Revolver" | 7:58 |
| 7. | "Native Place" | 6:27 |
| 8. | "Beyond The Fundamental" (Big Bud Remix) | 8:16 |
| 9. | "Radio Sirus" | 6:38 |
| Total length: | | 64:46 |

CD Bonus Track
| No. | Title | Length |
|---|---|---|
| 10. | "Byte Size Life" (Shimon Remix) | 7:08 |
| Total length: | | 71:54 |

== Release history ==
| Region | Date | Label | Format | Catalog |
|---|---|---|---|---|
| United Kingdom | 1999 | Moving Shadow | CD, 4xLP | ASHADOW 20 |
