= Inner City Life =

1994 single by Goldie

Single by Goldie Presents Metalheadz

from the album Timeless
- B-side: "Inner City Life" (remix)
- Released: 21 November 1994
- Genre: Drum and bass; jungle; breakbeat
- Length: 3:50 (radio edit); 7:00 (full-length); 21:03 (album version)
- Label: FFRR
- Songwriters: Clifford Joseph Price; Rob Playford
- Producer: Goldie

Goldie Presents Metalheadz singles chronology
"Inner City Life" (1994)	"Angel" (1995)

Music video
- "Inner City Life" on YouTube

"Inner City Life" is a song by British electronic musician Goldie featuring vocals by British singer Diane Charlemagne, released in November 1994 by FFRR Records as the first single from his acclaimed debut album, Timeless (1995). The song was written by Goldie with Rob Playford, and is widely considered one of the most iconic drum and bass works of its era. Accompanied by a music video directed by Mike Lipscombe, it peaked at No. 39 on the UK Singles Chart and No. 6 on the UK Dance Chart. NME ranked "Inner City Life" No. 11 in their list of the "50 Best Songs of 1994". In 2022 and 2025, Rolling Stone and Billboard magazine included it in their lists of the best dance songs of all time.

== Background and release ==
"It's still a good b-line after all this time. The thing I was kind of mad about was it never got radio play. No one would ever want to play it on the radio. Rinse FM or Kiss FM would not play the record and I found it very difficult, because when you look at it conventionally, it's a good record. But then it was completely out of sorts and I found that very difficult as far as "Timeless" was concerned. "Timeless" was made first and then "Inner City Life" came out of it and I always found it very difficult that no one wanted to play it on radio and didn't want to give it the air time."

— Goldie talking to Red Bull Music Academy about the song.

"Inner City Life" is a portion of Goldie's album Timeless' first track, "Timeless: Inner City Life/Pressure/Jah", which is a 21-minute opus. The song fuses the breakbeats and basslines common in jungle with orchestral textures and soul vocals by Diane Charlemagne. Goldie was a fan of her band 52nd Street and had sampled a record by them. He told in an interview with DJ Mag in 2024, "I'm hearing this voice of an angel. Oh my goodness, it's the same singer from 52nd Street, I really want to work with her. I want to make this beautiful song vicariously through her."

"Inner City Life" has been described as a ghetto-blues ballad, 'a yearning reverie of sanctuary from "inner-city pressure"' and features a sample from Ike Turner's song "Funky Mule", from his 1969 album, A Black Man's Soul. Goldie/Metal Heads became the first jungle act to make the Radio One playlist, albeit the N-list, with the track. Before the release on 21 November 1994, Goldie said, "A lot of the original underground rave tracks had a very euphoric feel about them, I wanted to give my track a euphoria so wide you had to be drawn into it." "Inner City Life" peaked at No. 49 on the UK Singles Chart same year. In 1995, it re-entered the chart, peaking at No. 39. "Inner City Life" was performed live at The Word on Channel 4 and it was included on the soundtrack to the film Trainspotting (Trainspotting 2: Music from the Motion Picture, Vol. 2). At the time of the release, the single didn't receive much radio play, according to Goldie.

== Critical reception ==
Andy Kellman from AllMusic described the song as "emotive". Larry Flick from Billboard magazine named it a "flawless gem". Ben Turner from The Guardian stated, "'Inner City Life' perhaps said it all – the sound of an intense and explosive urban city under a hot beautiful sunlight. The kind of feeling that something is about to blow. And that was jungle." Simon Reynolds from Melody Maker felt the "gorgeous jazzy vocals and Goldie's angelic/demonic strings could well make 'Inner City Life' the 'Unfinished Sympathy' of jungle". Another Melody Maker editor, Sarra Manning, praised the "caramel cream vocals" of Diane Charlemagne, "melting out urban angst platitudes over some more bass-heavy, bubbling fat noises." Dom Phillips from Music & Media noted its "vocal future jungle delights", while Maria Jimenez remarked the "soulful breakbeat", complimenting it as a high quality track of its dance sub-genre. Andy Beevers from Music Week gave it a score of four out of five and named it Pick of the Week in the category of dance, stating, "This is the most creative jungle tune yet. Diane Charlemagne's superb vocal soars over the plunging bass, galloping beats and almost ambient synth sweeps. It is a powerful combination that is earning DJ plays from unlikely quarters and deserves to cross over." In August 1995, Rupert Howe from Muzik wrote, "This is a masterpiece of melancholy, with all the dark/light, bass/melody contrasts in jungle thrown into kaleidoscopic relief. The spectral strings move disturbingly in and out of focus, the low frequencies seem to open up underneath you, and the eerie mutations of Diane Charlemagne's vocals float in the ether, utterly lost in space. Emotionally, it's all over the place - joyful one minute, intense enough to suck the daylight out of you the next. Anything to make you feel more alive."

In a separate review for NME in November 1994, Howe said, "This is it. Metalhead Goldie has finally fashioned a sound fusing so many of the present's finer elements that is timeless. As the track unfolds through Diane Charlemagne's spellbinding vocal hex and the splintered breakbeats you get flash-frames from a parallel landscape — fragments of soul, jungle, iced-out ambience — all encased in a holographic production that looms up like a physical presence. A soundtrack for life, wherever you choose to live it." NME editor Ted Kessler felt "it's like something from the first Soul II Soul album cross-pollinated with a ferocious breakbeat programmed by Captain Kirk. Very space-age, very new but not quite fully realised this time." Simon Reynolds for The Observer said it "could turn out to be jungle's breakthrough masterpiece". Brad Beatnik from the RM Dance Update named it Tune of the Week and considered it "perhaps the most talked about record of this month". He added, "The use of the strings and strong female vocals are the defining characteristics on a tune that deserves a standing ovation." Another RM editor, James Hamilton, noted that Charlemagne "calmly wails in jazz samba style through swirling shrill strings and explosively skittering 0-155-0bpm jungle beats, weird and atmospheric". Andrew Diprose from Smash Hits also gave it four out of five, writing, "Goldie is the closest we have to a jungle pop star and 'Inner City Life' is the tune that put him there! A soft, haunting track with the infamous rolling jungle beats, hard yet, erm, soft." Charles Aaron from Spin commented, "Like Marvin Gaye ruminating while rushing, he fades a breathtaking vocal by Diane Charlemagne (plus muted trumpet) in and out of ethereal beats. Fraught with dub's tensely apocalyptic vision and techno's hopeful twitch, this is finally the sound of an urban pulse that acknowledges both black and white expressions and tensions, and the feeling of coming up, going down, and needing to keep dancing forever. No other jungle I've heard has sounded like this. Or any other dance music, for that matter." Shane Danielsen from The Sydney Morning Herald noted the "swirling strings" of the track, "underpinned by complex poly-rhythms and booming subsonics."

== Music video ==
The accompanying music video of "Inner City Life" was directed by Mike Lipscombe. In the video, different residents of high-rise blocks appears in an urban city setting. Some scenes are filmed in a club. It features Goldie's grlfriend at the time, Tracy. Goldie told in an interview, "It was kind of special because it was shot inside Paradise Club, the double bed that we're sitting on, rolling around with Conrad, rolling around with Tracy, which is my girlfriend at the time, with Randall while the rest of the underground pass in a club, Men with a sticker with Paradise on it. While Randall was on the decks with his BMW in the video doing a 360." In one scene, a shopping trolley is falling in slow-motion from the top of one of the blocks. Goldie told, "You know, Mike Lipscombe at the time was a brilliant director. And he said to me when I met him, 'I'll do it on one condition. That I can have a shopping trolley in it falling.' Great video." It has interchangeable indigo and sepia tone and was later digitally remastered and made available on Goldie's official YouTube channel in 2020.

== Impact and legacy ==
Upon the re-release of the song in November 1995, Mark Sutherland from NME wrote, "The smooth urban soul of 'Inner City Life' is, of course, his finest moment." Same year, Spin ranked it No. 4 in their list of the 20 best singles of 1995. In 1996, British clubbing magazine Mixmag ranked "Inner City Life" No. 34 in its list of the best singles of 1996, "Mixmag End of Year Lists: 1996". British drum and bass DJ and producer Fabio named it one of his Top 10 tracks in July 1996, saying, "This track showed the scope of the music and it shocked so many people: before this record people thought drum & bass was good dance music and nothing else. This showed that the music could be as deep as Massive Attack or anything. It's good and bad all wrapped up in one." In 2010, David Crawford called the track "epic" in his book 10,001 Songs You Must Hear..., adding that it "boasted swirling strings, a clattering break beat that evolved throughout the track, and Diane Charlemagne's sweet, soulful vocals on top."

In 2013, Complex included it in their list of "The 15 Best Songs from the Electronica Era", noting, "Chock full of soul, precision breakbeat edits, and strings, 'Inner City Life' helped let the mainstream know that drum & bass was more than the chin-stroking dark sounds in the corner, and was more than capable of making tracks that could move you emotionally." Same year the song was ranked No. 30 in Mixmag's list of "50 Greatest Dance Tracks of All Time". In 2018, Time Out ranked the track No. 23 in their "50 Best '90s Songs" list, writing, "Fusing jungle's intricate breakbeats, sub bass and unbridled futurism with heart-aching soul soundscapes and the lamenting voice of Diane Charlemagne, this beautiful-yet-brutal piece of sonic art switched an entire generation on to the power of jungle and D&B." In October 2022, Rolling Stone ranked it No. 78 in their list of the "200 Greatest Dance Songs of All Time". In March 2025, Billboard magazine ranked it No. 12 in their "The 100 Best Dance Songs of All Time".

=== Accolades ===
Year	Publisher	Country	Accolade	Rank
1995	NME	United Kingdom	"50 Best Songs of 1994"	11
1995	Spin	United States	"20 Best Singles of 1995"	4
1996	Mixmag	United Kingdom	"End of Year Lists: 1996"	34
1999	Spin	United States	"The Top 20 Singles of the 90s"	9
2004	IDJ	United States	"The 50 Greatest Dance Singles"	20
2005	Süddeutsche Zeitung	Germany	"1020 Songs 1955-2005"	*
2010	Groove	Germany	"Die 100 wichtigsten Tracks der letzten 20 Jahre"	*
2010	Musikexpress	Germany	"The 50 Best Songs of the 1990s"	42
2011	The Guardian	United Kingdom	"A History of Modern Music: Dance"	*
2013	Complex	United States	"The 15 Best Songs from the Electronica Era"	*
2013	Mixmag	United Kingdom	"50 Greatest Dance Tracks of All Time"	30
2013	Robert Dimery	United States	1001 Songs You Must Hear Before You Die	*
2018	Time Out	United Kingdom	"50 Best '90s Songs"	23
2019	BBC	United Kingdom	"30 Tracks That Shaped Dance Music Over the Last 30 Years"	*
2022	Classic Pop	United Kingdom	"90s Dance – The Essential Playlist"	26
2022	Pitchfork	United States	"The 250 Best Songs of the 1990s"	125
2022	Rolling Stone	United States	"200 Greatest Dance Songs of All Time"	78
2024	Sveriges Radio P3	Sweden	"P300 – Världens 300 bästa låtar"	263
2025	Billboard	United States	"The 100 Best Dance Songs of All Time"	12

(*) indicates the list is unordered.

== Track listing ==
- 12"-single, Goldie Presents Metalheads – "Inner City Life" (1994)
1. "Inner City Life"
2. "Jah"
- 12"-single, Goldie Presents Metalheads – "Inner City Life" (Remixes) (1994)
1. "Inner City Life" (Roni Size Instant Mix)
2. "Inner City Life" (Nookie Remix)
- Maxi-single, Goldie Presents Metalheads – "Inner City Life" (1994)
1. "Inner City Life" (Radio Edit) – 3:50
2. "Inner City Life" (Full-Length) – 7:00
3. "Inner City Life" (4 Hero Mix Pt. 1) – 8:24
4. "Inner City Life" (Roni Size Instant Mix) – 5:47
- CD-single, Goldie – "Inner City Life" (1995)
1. "Inner City Life" (Original Version) – 7:00
2. "Inner City Life" (Peshay Mix) – 9:41
3. "Inner City Life" (Doc Scott Mix) – 8:14
- 12"-single, Goldie vs. Rabbit in the Moon – "Inner City Life" (The Remixes) (1996)
1. "Inner City Life" (Rabbit in the Moon's Vocalic City) – 11:20
2. "Inner City Life" (Rabbit in the Moon's Escape from Vocalic City) – 7:58
3. "Inner City Life" (Rabbit in the Moon's Return to Vocalic City) – 7:06
- Maxi-single, Goldie – "Inner City Life" (The Remixes) (1996)
1. "Inner City Life" (Original Edit) – 3:13
2. "Inner City Life" (Baby Boy's Edit) – 3:34
3. "Inner City Life" (Rabbit's Short Attention Span Edit) – 4:20
4. "Inner City Life" (Goes to Miami Mix) – 5:39
5. "Inner City Life" (4 Hero Mix Pt. 1) – 8:22
6. "Inner City Life" (Rabbit in the Moon's Vocalic City) – 11:20
7. "Inner City Life" (Rabbit in the Moon's Escape from Vocalic City) – 7:58
8. "Inner City Life" (Peshay Mix) – 9:40
9. "Inner City Life" (Baby Boys) – 6:49
10. "Inner City Life" (Rabbit in the Moon's Return to Vocalic City) – 7:06

== Charts ==
Chart (1994)	Peak position
Scotland (OCC)	88
UK Singles (OCC)	49
UK Dance (OCC)	6

Chart (1995)	Peak position
Scotland (OCC)	47
UK Singles (OCC)	39
UK Dance (OCC)	17
UK R&B (OCC)	6

== Cover versions, samples and remixes ==
- German jazz band [Re:jazz] covered "Inner City Life" on their 2004 album, Point of View.
- English rapper Wiley sampled "Inner City Life" on his song "I Need to Be" from the 2008 album, See Clear Now.
- Aaron Jerome and his musical project Sbtrkt sampled the song on the song "Timeless", in 2009.
- It was sampled on "Strictly (Kassem Mosse 'Need to Feel edit' remix)" by Commix in 2010.
- British band Hackney Colliery Band covered "Inner City Life" on their 2013 album, Common Decency.
- British DJ Om Unit sampled "Inner City Life" on his song "Parallel" from the 2014 album, Inversion.
- Goldie remastered the song in 2017.
- In 2020, Goldie announced a project on 25 years of project with interviews, archives, re-masters, remixes and re:jazz version.
