= Believe (Goldie song) =

1998 single by Goldie

Single by Goldie

from the album Saturnz Return
- Released: 6 April 1998
- Recorded: 1997
- Genre: Intelligent drum and bass; nu jazz; trip hop
- Length: 7:09 (album version); 4:03 (radio edit); 5:06 (extended radio edit)
- Label: FFRR
- Songwriter: Goldie
- Producer: Goldie

Goldie singles chronology
| "Temper Temper" (1997) | "Believe" (1998) | "Ring of Saturn" (1998) |

"Believe" is a song by English musician Goldie, released by FFRR as third single from the musician's second album, Saturnz Return (1998). The song reached number 36 on the UK Singles Chart on 18 April 1998. It features vocals from Goldie's frequent collaborator Diane Charlemagne and is one of the most soul and jazz-influenced tracks on the album alongside "Crystal Clear" and "Dragonfly".

== Critical reception ==
A reviewer from Music Week wrote, "There is a mellow mood on this muted, horn-led — almost disco — tune which acts as a showcase for Diane Charlemagne's vocal talents and Goldie's fluffier side. The anthemic quality and soulful delivery will win radio play, which will help broaden its appeal beyond the confines of Goldie's drum & bass constituency." Brad Beatnik from the Record Mirror Dance Update gave "Believe" four out of five, naming it one of the standout vocal tracks from the album, and "a soulful breeze of a tune that wouldn't sound out of place on Talkin' Loud thanks to its mellow funk tones."

== Track listing ==
Side A

1. "Believe" (extended version) – 7:01
2. "Believe" (Photek mix) – 6:56

Side B

1. "Believe" (Grooverider mix) – 10:43

== Personnel ==
- Goldie – production, keyboards, programming, guitar, drums
- Diane Charlemagne – vocals
- Tim 'Da Bass' Philbert – bass
- Justina Curtis – keyboards
- John Eastcoat – brass arrangement
- Rob Playford – engineering
- Twig – mastering
- Howard Wakefield, Paul Hetherington – design

== Charts ==
Chart performance for "Believe"
| Chart (1998) | Peak position |
|---|---|
| New Zealand (Recorded Music NZ) | 49 |
| UK Singles (OCC) | 36 |
