= Walking Wounded (Everything but the Girl song) =

1996 single by Everything but the Girl

Single by Everything but the Girl

from the album Walking Wounded
- Released: 8 April 1996
- Recorded: 1995
- Studio: Little Joey's, Milo, The Strongroom (London, England)
- Genre: Ambient jungle; drum and bass
- Length: 6:05 (album version); 4:06 (edit)
- Label: Virgin
- Composer: Spring Heel Jack
- Lyricist: Ben Watt
- Producer: Spring Heel Jack

Everything but the Girl singles chronology
| "Missing" (Todd Terry remix) (1995) | "Walking Wounded" (1996) | "Wrong" (1996) |

Music video
- "Walking Wounded" on YouTube

"Walking Wounded" is a song by English musical duo Everything but the Girl. Member Ben Watt wrote the song's lyrics while electronic music duo Spring Heel Jack (John Coxon and Ashley Wales) composed the music and produced the track. The song appears on Everything but the Girl's ninth studio album, Walking Wounded (1996), in two different versions: the album version as track five and the Omni Trio remix as the final track. It was the duo's first single release on Virgin Records, as their previous label, Blanco y Negro, had dropped them before the Todd Terry remix of "Missing" became a worldwide hit.

In April 1996, "Walking Wounded" was released as the first single from the album in the United Kingdom; in the United States, "Wrong" served as the lead single instead. Music critics acclaimed the song, with several focusing on Tracey Thorn's vocal performance. Commercially, "Walking Wounded" peaked at number six on the UK Singles Chart, giving the duo their third top-10 hit, and entered the top 40 in four other countries. A black-and-white music video was made for the single, featuring Thorn, Watt, and others holding up picture frames in front of various people.

== Critical reception ==
Professional ratings
Review scores
| Source | Rating |
|---|---|
| Smash Hits | 5/5 stars |

Andy Beevers of British newspaper Record Mirror gave "Walking Wounded" a ranking of five out of five, praising the band for not reworking one of their older tracks and comparing it to Tracey Thorn's collaborations with Massive Attack, describing the single as a "melancholy downbeat song" and the main vocal mix as "atmospheric". Trade paper Music Week also gave the song a five out of five and named it their "Single of the Week" for 30 March 1996, complimenting Thorn's vocals on the track and calling it a "wonderful take on ambient jungle". Timothy White of Billboard magazine called the track "foreboding" and noted that both it and "Wrong" "represent further advances in Thorn and Watt's proficiency at bending the jungle/drum-and-bass dance rhythms of London's clubs and New York's deep house scene to their own neo-jazz-pop purposes". Victoria Segal from Melody Maker said it "is very fine indeed, Tracey's voice almost unbearably vulnerable as it threatens to fall through the gaps in Spring Heel Jack's spacious, rolling mix."

Retrospectively, "Walking Wounded" has continued to receive acclaim. In 2017, Rhino Entertainment noted Thorn's "haunting" vocal performance and the track's "skittering percussion", writing that it has a "stillness that cuts through the busy undercurrent". In 2021, Justin Chadwick of music website Albumism wrote that the song "begins in atmospheric, subdued fashion before gloriously morphing into hypnotic drum and bass patterns". Reviewing the parent album on his website in 2023, British music critic Steve Pafford referred to "Walking Wounded" as "gorgeously orchestrated" and noted the compatibility between Thorn's vocals and the music.

== Commercial performance ==
On the UK Singles Chart, "Walking Wounded" debuted and peaked at number six on the week beginning 14 April 1996, giving Everything but the Girl their third top-10 hit and fifth top-40 single. It stayed in the top 100 for 12 nonconsecutive weeks, making it the duo's second-longest stay on the UK chart, after "Missing". It also peaked at number two on the UK Dance Singles Chart. In Ireland, the single spent top weeks within the Irish Singles Chart top 30, peaking at number 29. On the Eurochart Hot 100, the song debuted at number 33 on 27 April 1996 based on its UK sales alone. The following week, with sales from France, Ireland, and Sweden added in, it rose to its peak of number 30. Across Europe, the song charted in Sweden and Switzerland, reaching numbers 34 and 41, respectively. It was also a top-40 hit in both Australia and New Zealand, peaking at number 30 in the former country and at number 31 in the latter.

== Track listings ==
- UK, Australian, and Japanese CD single
1. "Walking Wounded" (main vocal mix edit) – 4:06
2. "Walking Wounded" (hard vocal mix) – 6:05
3. "Walking Wounded" (Omni Trio remix) – 6:43
4. "Walking Wounded" (Dave Wallace remix) – 8:18
5. "Walking Wounded" (main vocal mix) – 6:04
6. "Walking Wounded" (Spring Heel Jack dub mix) – 6:49
- UK 12-inch single

A1. "Walking Wounded" (main vocal mix) – 6:04
A2. "Walking Wounded" (Spring Heel Jack dub mix) – 6:49
AA1. "Walking Wounded" (Dave Wallace remix) – 8:18
AA2. "Walking Wounded" (Omni Trio remix) – 6:43

- UK cassette single
1. "Walking Wounded" (main vocal mix edit) – 4:06
2. "Walking Wounded" (Omni Trio remix) – 6:43
3. "Walking Wounded" (hard vocal mix) – 6:05
- European CD single
1. "Walking Wounded" (main vocal mix) – 6:04
2. "Walking Wounded" (Omni Trio remix) – 6:43

== Credits and personnel ==
Credits are adapted from the UK CD single liner notes and the Walking Wounded album notes.

Studios

- Recorded in 1995 at Little Joey's, Milo, and The Strongroom (London, England)
- Mixed at various studios in London and New York City

Personnel

- Everything but the Girl – artwork design
  - Tracey Thorn – vocals
  - Ben Watt – words, melody, synths, beats, abstract sounds
- Spring Heel Jack – music, programming, recording, production, mixing
- Mads Bjerke – engineering
- Form – artwork design
- Marcelo Krasilcic – photography

== Charts ==
| Chart (1996) | Peak position |
|---|---|
| Australia (ARIA) | 30 |
| Estonia (Eesti Top 20) | 9 |
| Europe (Eurochart Hot 100) | 30 |
| Ireland (IRMA) | 29 |
| New Zealand (Recorded Music NZ) | 31 |
| Scottish Singles Sales (Official Charts) | 13 |
| Sweden (Sverigetopplistan) | 34 |
| Switzerland (Schweizer Hitparade) | 41 |
| UK Singles (Official Charts) | 6 |
| UK Dance (Official Charts) | 2 |

== Release history ==
| Region | Date | Format(s) | Label(s) | Ref. |
|---|---|---|---|---|
| United Kingdom | 8 April 1996 | 12-inch vinyl; CD; cassette | Virgin | |
| Japan | 9 May 1996 | CD | Virgin | |
