= Saturnz Return =

Studio album by Goldie
- Released: 27 January 1998
- Studio: Angel Recording Studios (London); Manic One (London); Pierce Rooms (London); Ridge Farm Studios (Capel); The Hit Factory (New York City); Jacobs Studios (Farnham)
- Genre: Drum and bass; electronica; acid jazz; trip hop
- Length: 149:16 (CD); 75:14 (cassette); 73:20 (vinyl)
- Label: FFRR
- Producer: Goldie; Rob Playford

Goldie chronology
Timeless (1995)	Saturnz Return (1998)	Ring of Saturn (1998)

Saturnz Return is the second studio album by Goldie, released on 27 January 1998. The album entered the UK Albums Chart at 15, however only spent four weeks on the chart in total.

The album received mixed reviews upon release, with particular negative attention paid to the hour-long opening track "Mother".

== Content and documentary ==
The album opens with the hour-long piece "Mother", which includes a "30-piece string section" and "classically trained child singers" and was intended to sonically represent Goldie being put up for adoption at age three by his mother, being raised in multiple children's homes and by various foster parents, as well as his life in the public eye after the success of his first album and becoming addicted to cocaine. Goldie said he needed to make it, and described it as opening with a "beautiful piece of music that's the voice of a child who's not arrived yet" before "the whole thing descends, and it's being cast away [...] He's trying to find his way and he becomes a monster, and the beats become really complex and start to grow really fierce".

Goldie filmed an accompanying documentary, Goldie: When Saturn Returnz, about his search for his birth parents, in which he questioned his biological father and "chastis[ed]" his birth mother, which was considered "uncomfortable viewing" by Alexis Petridis of The Guardian. Goldie subsequently reconciled with his mother before her death, and she asked him to play the track at her funeral. He refused due to its length, but played the track on his headphones while seeing her body before her funeral. He stated that the experience of making the track "was what it was for. [...] It was for that simple moment."

== Reception ==
Professional ratings
Review scores
Source	Rating
AllMusic	2/5 stars
Chicago Tribune	2/4 stars
Entertainment Weekly	B
The Guardian	3/5 stars
Los Angeles Times	3/4 stars
Muzik	7/10
NME	8/10
Pitchfork	8.6/10
Rolling Stone	2.5/5 stars
Spin	6/10

Goldie said that his record label were expecting "something like [his] first album" Timeless after he had become the "poster boy for drum'n'bass" in the years following its release. The label listening to the hour-long "Mother" was dramatised in the 2008 John Niven novel Kill Your Friends, with Goldie claiming that their dissatisfaction with it was also "the end for one [label executive]'s career". The suite also divided British music critics at the time, who "were so perplexed that largely they chose to ignore the rest of the album" despite following tracks featuring David Bowie, Noel Gallagher and KRS-One.

The album was reissued for its 21st anniversary in 2019 with an additional disc of old and new remixes. Goldie stated in an interview that he "tried to tell [his label] no" but that they "insisted", saying: "I don’t know whether it's the company trying to recoup the money they lost on it in the first place, or if they genuinely believe in Saturnz Return as an album". Reviewing the reissue, Backseatmafia stated that "twenty years on, his vision is thoroughly vindicated".

== Track listing ==
All tracks are written by Goldie, except where noted

CD pressing

Mother
No.	Title	Writer(s)	Length
1.	"Mother"	Goldie; Optical; John Altman	60:11
2.	"Truth" (featuring David Bowie; includes hidden track, "The Dream Within")		13:52

Saturn
No.	Title	Writer(s)	Length
1.	"Temper Temper" (featuring Noel Gallagher)		5:14
2.	"Digital" (featuring KRS-One)		5:51
3.	"I'll Be There for You"	Goldie; Anne Dudley; Malcolm McLaren; Trevor Horn	6:57
4.	"Believe"		7:09
5.	"Dragonfly"		16:04
6.	"Chico – Death of a Rockstar"	Goldie; Jorge Mautner; Rob Playford	7:14
7.	"Letter of Fate"		7:54
8.	"Fury – The Origin"		6:30
9.	"Crystal Clear"	Goldie; Justina Curtis	6:53
10.	"Demonz"		5:28
Total length:			149:16

The cassette release is identical to the Saturn disc, with five songs on each side.

Vinyl pressing

Side A
No.	Title	Writer(s)	Length
1.	"I'll Be There for You"	Goldie; Anne Dudley; Malcolm McLaren; Trevor Horn	6:57

Side B
No.	Title	Writer(s)	Length
1.	"Chico – Death of a Rockstar"	Goldie; Jorge Mautner; Rob Playford	7:14

Side C
No.	Title	Length
1.	"Fury – The Origin"	6:30

Side D
No.	Title	Writer(s)	Length
1.	"Crystal Clear"	Goldie; Justina Curtis	6:53

Side E
No.	Title	Length
1.	"Demonz"	5:28

Side F
No.	Title	Length
1.	"Digital" (featuring KRS-One)	5:51
2.	"Temper Temper" (featuring Noel Gallagher)	5:14

Side G
No.	Title	Length
1.	"Letter of Fate"	7:54
2.	"Truth" (featuring David Bowie)	5:15

Side H
No.	Title	Length
1.	"Dragonfly"	16:04
Total length:		73:20

== Charts ==
Chart performance for Saturnz Return
Chart (1998)	Peak position
Austrian Albums (Ö3 Austria)	35
Dutch Albums (Album Top 100)	44
Finnish Albums (Suomen virallinen lista)	35
French Albums (SNEP)	51
German Albums (Offizielle Top 100)	43
New Zealand Albums (RMNZ)	30
Norwegian Albums (VG-lista)	35
Swiss Albums (Schweizer Hitparade)	38
UK Albums (OCC)	15
