= E-Z Rollers =

British drum and bass group

- Origin: Beccles, Suffolk, England
- Genres: Drum and bass, jungle
- Years active: 1995–present
- Label: Moving Shadow
- Members: Jay Hurren; Alex Banks; Kelly Richards

E-Z Rollers are a British drum and bass group. The group was formed in 1995 in Suffolk, England.

E-Z Rollers began releasing output on the Moving Shadow label, but later created their own label called Intercom Recordings. In 2007, they released the album, Conductor.

== History ==
One of their first hits was "Rolled into One", and other tracks included: their single "Short Change" which is the theme song of Grand Theft Auto 2 by Rockstar Games; "Cop Theme" which was a part of the Sled Storm soundtrack; The Origin Unknown remix of "Tough at the Top"; "Soundclash" part of the Rollcage soundtrack, and "Breakbeat Generation" which can be heard in the introduction of Rollcage Stage II. Their song "Walk This Land" was heard in the film, Lock, Stock and Two Smoking Barrels. The track peaked at #18 in the UK Singles Chart in April 1999. Their songs "Retro" and "Soundclash" can also be heard on the video game TOCA 2 Touring Cars by Codemasters.

== Discography ==
=== Studio albums ===
- Dimensions of Sound (1996)
- Weekend World (1998)
- Titles of the Unexpected (2002)
- Conductor (2007)

=== Mix albums ===
- Drumfunk Hooliganz (1998)
- Lickable Beats (2003)
- Lickable Beats 2 (2005)
- 05.1 (2005)
