= Everybody Loves Sunshine =

- Directed by: Andrew Goth
- Written by: Andrew Goth
- Produced by: Joanne Reay
- Starring: Rachel Shelley, David Bowie, Goldie
- Music by: Nicky Matthew
- Release date: 20 March 1999
- Running time: 97 minutes
- Language: English

Everybody Loves Sunshine (released in the United States as B.U.S.T.E.D.), is a 1999 British independent film written and directed by Andrew Goth and starring Rachel Shelley, David Bowie and Goldie.

== Plot ==
In the Pepperhill Estate of Manchester, an ongoing battle rages between Triad gangs and street gangs. Gang leaders Ray and Terry, who are cousins and lifelong friends, always trusting and relying on each other, have been in prison. Ray doesn't want to be a gangster anymore, having also fallen for Clare. But Terry, driven by an obsession beyond friendship, is determined to make sure that Ray never leaves the gang. During their time in prison, the Triads have grown stronger and more daring, eventually killing a member of Terry and Ray's gang. Revenge is called for and the gang turns to them for direction. Bernie is the aging gangster who struggles to keep the peace.

== Cast ==
- Goldie as Terry
- Andrew Goth as Ray
- David Bowie as Bernie
- Rachel Shelley as Clare
- Clint Dyer as Leon
- Sarah Shackleton as Helen
- David Baker as Clinton
- Paul Hawkyard as Ken
- Graham Bryan as Pat
- Danny Price as Spider

== Critical reception ==
Film Threat magazine described the film as a "very British tale of vengeance and mayhem worth sitting through – though just barely," crediting the film's "arresting visual presentation." The review notes that Bowie's an "odd presence throughout" and "he often seems to be wandering in from a movie on another channel."

== See also ==
- Gangster No. 1
