= Adapt or Die =

Adapt or Die may refer to:

- "Adapt or Die" (Agents of S.H.I.E.L.D.), an episode of the seventh season of Agents of S.H.I.E.L.D.
- Adapt or Die (Magic City)
- Adapt or Die: Ten Years of Remixes
