= 2 Bad Mice =

UK musical group

- Origin: Hertford / Stevenage, England
- Genre: Breakbeat hardcore
- Years active: 1991–1995, 2010–present
- Label: Moving Shadow
- Members: Sean O'Keeffe; Simon Colebrooke
- Past members: Rob Playford; Paul Rhodes
- Website: store.2badmice.co.uk

Formed in 1991, 2 Bad Mice are an English breakbeat hardcore group, composed of Sean O'Keeffe, Simon Colebrooke, and Rob Playford who was originally the third member and the owner of the Moving Shadow record label. In the 1990s, the group had two singles that charted in the UK.

== History ==
O'Keefe and Colebrooke first experimented with music in 1990, using equipment and spare time at Playford's home studio. The trio formed 2 Bad Mice in 1991. Their first chart success was "Hold It Down" which reached number 48 in February 1992.

2 Bad Mice stopped producing as the hardcore scene began to wane. A best-of compilation of the group's work appeared on the American Sm:)e Communications label in 1995.

=== Post split ===
In September 1996, "Bombscare" which reached number 46 in the UK charts.

A new label was created in 1996 called Moshed (MOving Shadow HousE Dept). It was set up with the help of Terry Donavan (A&R at Arista Records, who went on to co-found Rockstar Games). This label, released new mixes of "Bombscare" by Tall Paul, DJ Sneak, and Graham Gold, along with the original and Parliament Squares versions.

In 1997, the song "Waremouse" appeared in the movie The Jackal in the scene where Bruce Willis kissed a man in a gay nightclub.

Playford continues to record as under the alias Timecode, while O'Keeffe records under the name Deep Blue and as a member of Black Rain.

The members of 2 Bad Mice are also members of Kaotic Chemistry.

In 2020 2 Bad Mice set up a new label Over/Shadow which incorporates the original Moving Shadow Artists with new talent. www.over-shadow.co.uk

== Musical style ==
2 Bad Mice are credited as among the first UK hardcore acts to begin incorporating breakbeats into their style. They were part of the early to mid-1990s hardcore scene, and were instrumental in the music's steady mutation into jungle/drum and bass.
