= Timeless (Goldie album) =

Studio album by Goldie
- Released: 7 August 1995
- Recorded: England
- Genre: Jungle; drum and bass
- Length: 105:47 (2×CD and 2×MC); 75:04 (CD and MC); 54:46 (2×LP)
- Label: FFRR
- Producer: Goldie; Rob Playford

Goldie chronology
Timeless (1995)	Saturnz Return (1998)

Singles from Timeless
- 1. "Inner City Life" Released: 21 November 1994; 2. "Angel" Released: 1995

Timeless is the debut studio album by British electronic musician Goldie. It was released on 7 August 1995 through FFRR Records. The album is widely regarded as a groundbreaking release in the history of drum and bass music.

== History ==
Goldie was joined in the studio by engineer/producer Rob Playford (founder of the Moving Shadow label), who did most of the programming and production, with Goldie generating the musical ideas, rhythms and arrangements. Additional engineering and production came from Dillinja, and Dego and Marc Mac of 4hero. Diane Charlemagne and Lorna Harris contributed the bulk of the vocals. The title track of Timeless includes what has become the most recognisable and crossover hit from the album, "Inner City Life". Tracks such as "Angel", "You & Me" and "Kemistry" (dedicated to DJ Kemistry) appeared in remastered form from their original 1992/93 versions.

Released on Pete Tong's FFRR label, the album reached no. 7 on the UK Albums Chart. Timeless was simultaneously released as a double album and single album. The single album removed four tracks and featured the original mix of "Sensual". The US release of the double album appended two bonus remixes.

== Reception ==
Professional ratings
Review scores
Source	Rating
AllMusic	5/5 stars
Christgau's Consumer Guide	C+
The Encyclopedia of Popular Music	4/5 stars
The Guardian	4/5 stars
Los Angeles Times	3.5/4 stars
Music & Media	Favorable
Muzik	5/5
NME	9/10
The Rolling Stone Album Guide	3/5 stars
Spin	9/10

Timeless is listed as one of the 1001 Albums You Must Hear Before You Die.

- Spin (12/95, p. 63) – Ranked No. 17 on Spin's list of the '20 Best Albums Of '95.'
- Spin (12/95, p.81) – 9 – Near Perfect – "A fall of light into the urban endzone... Goldie has taken jungle to a more expansive level here, fusing its ominous bad-boy polyrhythms with gorgeous diva vocals, rich piano playing, and upbeat jazzy chords that dissolve into ambient clouds...brings jungle to a new level of cross-fertilization..."
- Alternative Press (1/96, p. 80) – "Starting with the increasingly familiar... palette of jungle/drum and bass music, Goldie and his Metalheadz sculpt expansive sonic constructions that elude the linear confines of descriptive language."
- Melody Maker (12/23-30/95, pp. 66–67) – Ranked No. 8 on Melody Maker's list of 1995's 'Albums of the Year' – "The jungle underground's figurehead... Massive and jaw-droppingly ambitious."
- Village Voice (2/20/96) – Ranked No. 23 in Village Voice's 1995 Pazz & Jop Critics' Poll.
- The New York Times (1/6/96, p. C16) – Included in Neil Strauss' list of the Top 10 Albums of '95 – "The frenetic break beats of Great Britain's jungle dance-music rub against lush ambient music, live instruments and a technology-addled sense of soul..."
- NME (12/23–30/95, pp. 22–23) – Ranked No. 10 in NME's 'Top 50 Albums of the Year' for 1995 – "An astonishing...symphony of whizzing breakbeats, fluid soundscapes and mind-warping moodswings..."
- The Guardian – Described the release of the album as one of the "50 key events in the history of dance music" in 2011.

== Track listing ==
2×CD edition

All tracks are written by Goldie, except where noted.

Disc one
No.	Title	Writer(s)	Length
1.	"Timeless: Inner City Life/Pressure/Jah"	Goldie; Diane Charlemagne; Rob Playford	21:01
2.	"Saint Angel"		7:14
3.	"State of Mind"	Goldie; Playford	7:05
4.	"This Is a Bad"		5:56
5.	"Sea of Tears"	Goldie; Playford	12:03
6.	"Jah the Seventh Seal"	Goldie; Playford	6:36

Disc two
No.	Title	Writer(s)	Length
1.	"A Sense of Rage" (Sensual V.I.P mix)	Goldie; Playford	7:05
2.	"Still Life"		10:50
3.	"Angel"		4:56
4.	"Adrift"	Goldie; Justina Curtis	8:29
5.	"Kemistry"		6:48
6.	"You & Me"		7:04
7.	"Inner City Life (Baby Boy's edit)" (US bonus track; remix by Photek)		3:34
8.	"Inner City Life (Rabbit's Short Attention Span edit)" (US bonus track; remix by Rabbit in the Moon)		4:20

CD/cassette edition

No.	Title	Writer(s)	Length
1.	"Timeless: Inner City Life/Pressure/Jah"	Goldie; Diane Charlemagne; Rob Playford	21:01
2.	"Saint Angel"		7:14
3.	"State of Mind"	Goldie; Playford	7:05
4.	"Sea of Tears"	Goldie; Playford	12:03
5.	"Angel"		4:56
6.	"Sensual"		8:13
7.	"Kemistry"		6:48
8.	"You & Me"		7:04

The cassette release is identical to the single CD release, with three songs on the first side and five on the second side.

2×LP/vinyl edition

Sides A/B
No.	Title	Length
1.	"Saint Angel"	7:14
2.	"This Is a Bad"	5:56
3.	"Kemistry" (V.I.P mix)	5:35
4.	"You & Me"	7:04

Sides C/D
No.	Title	Writer(s)	Length
5.	"Still Life"		10:50
6.	"Still Life" (V.I.P mix; The Latino Dego in Me)		5:26
7.	"Jah the Seventh Seal"	Goldie; Playford	6:36
8.	"A Sense of Rage" (Sensual V.I.P mix)	Goldie; Playford	7:05

== Charts ==
Chart performance for Timeless
Chart (1995)	Peak position
New Zealand Albums (RMNZ)	46
Swedish Albums (Sverigetopplistan)	22
UK Albums (OCC)	7
