= Temper Temper (Goldie song) =

Single by Goldie featuring Noel Gallagher

from the album Saturnz Return
- Released: 9 December 1997
- Genre: Drum and bass; electronic rock; experimental rock
- Length: 5:16 (album version); 4:22 (video edit)
- Label: FFRR

Goldie singles chronology
| "Moving Shadow 100" (1997) | "Temper Temper" (1997) | "Believe" (1998) |

"Temper Temper" is a song by English musician Goldie, released as the second single from his 1998 album Saturnz Return. It features Noel Gallagher on guitar.

The song reached number 13 on the UK Singles Chart on 24 January 1998, which is Goldie's highest-charting single along with "Digital" (featuring KRS-One). It uses aggressive guitar melodies played by Gallagher and Goldie's own aggressive singing and stands as one of the most rock and industrial-influenced songs in the musician's career. Although never an Oasis fan favourite, it was received positively by Goldie and Noel Gallagher.

There was a music video released which featured both Goldie and Gallagher and also various scenes with people fighting, disturbing and breaking objects.

== Composition ==
A collaboration with Oasis guitarist Noel Gallagher, "Temper Temper" sees Goldie drastically move into punkier territory. It is one of several pieces on the producer's second album, Saturnz Return (1998), to "expound musically on his inner realms", alongside the opening track, "Mother", which explores his relationship with his mother. As Muzik critic Calvin Bush explains, "Temper Temper" unleashes Goldie's pent-up "in-built rage and volatility [which, as here] sometimes spills over into uncontrollable fury." Goldie explained:

"I always used to lose my temper. [...] As a youth, I had to learn to ruck, cos I got bullied and fucked around. I got kicked in by skinheads. I was a wanker, man. I couldn't stand on my own two feet. I had get beaten down before I could learn how to get up again. I wanted to destroy things all the time. I was a pretty destructive kid. I used to put my Action Men at the bottom of my stairs and get fucking darts and drop them on them to impale them."

"Temper Temper" has been described as mixing drum and bass or jungle with punk rock, or even heavy metal. Gallagher's processed guitar work is discordant, incorporating distortion and feedback, whereas Goldie's vocals are garbled. Bush described "Temper Temper" as "unbridled punk-jungle, Noel Gallagher's squall of guitars fighting it out with Goldie's primal screams."

== Release and promotion ==
Oasis historians Ted Kessler and Hamish McBain comment that the much-anticipated "Temper Temper" was one of several DJ-oriented projects of the era featuring Gallagher to disprove the notion that the musician was a "guitars-only-please luddite". Gallagher had already worked with former Heavenly Social DJs the Chemical Brothers, co-writing and singing vocals on their noisy, abrasive single "Setting Sun", which topped the UK chart in 1996, and remixed Beck's "Devil's Haircut" later that same year. Gallagher's discordant contributions to "Temper Temper" came ahead of his instrumental piece for The X-Files film soundtrack, "Teotihuacan" (1998), in which he sampled drums from a Dr. Dre and Ice Cube single, and his sample-based remix of UNKLE's "The Knock (On Effect)" in 1999, which in turn laid the groundwork for Oasis' "Fuckin' in the Bushes" (2000). The music writer Owen Hatherley deems "Temper Temper" to be an "atrocious metal–drum&bass mess", but notes the significance of Gallagher's appearance, as the only notable prior example of a genuine Britpop artist taking influence from jungle music at its height was Pulp's song "F.E.E.L.I.N.G.C.A.L.L.E.D.L.O.V.E" (1995), which incorporates jungle-inspired rhythmic fusillades and timestretched breaks.

"Temper Temper" was Goldie's second hit in several months, following the KRS-One collaboration "Digital" in November 1997. Matching the latter single's chart peak, "Temper Temper" entered and peaked on the UK Singles Chart at number 13 on the week of 18 January 1998, the same day Oasis' "All Around the World" debuted at number one. Chart commentator James Masterton of Dotmusic noted that Gallagher contributed "the same manic distorted feedback" to the single that had made "Setting Sun" become a major hit, adding that although Goldie is a master of jungle music, "he is also the king of making an almighty racket and on the strength of this track could well reign for a long time to come."

The track's music video depicts Goldie losing his temper, breaking lots of crockery with a baseball bat and swinging a chainsaw over Gallagher's head, while a disturbing figure dressed in a white suit attacks unsuspecting members of the public. The video was described as "excessively violent" and was one of several controversial dance videos to be banned on television within months of each other, alongside the Prodigy's "Smack My Bitch Up", Aphex Twin's "Come to Daddy" and Death in Vegas' "Dirt" (all released in late 1997). To gauge public opinion, NME screened the four videos to a panel of commentators, one of whom was printed as saying there is "nothing offensive" about the "Temper Temper" video and that "you might as well ban the All Saints video ["Never Ever"] because it has explosions in it."

== Critical reception ==
"Temper Temper" was singled out in music critics' reviews of Saturnz Return. Reviewing the album for NME, Stephen Dalton highlighted the track's "bullying, gnarly percussion and churned-up guitar innards", and identified the Chemical Brothers' "Setting Sun" and the Prodigy's "Firestarter" (both 1996) as clear reference points. Despite deeming it inferior to those tracks, Dalton prasied "Temper Temper" for being a rare example of Gallagher "royally mistreating his precious fretboard", adding: "The notion of two rock icons getting ugly with each other doesn't quite deliver all its promised fireworks, but their pantomime villain act is good for a cheap thrill." Spin deemed the "rocked-out" track to be one of the album's "melodramatic" collaborations, writing that Gallagher "contributes fat guitar riffs full of laughing gas–and it works." Neil Strauss of Rolling Stone described it as "angry, caterwauling, Prodigylike punk", and noted it contributed to the album's eclecticism. Ryan Schreiber of Pitchfork deemed it a highlight of the album, calling it "the soundtrack to those moments of sheer, unrelenting anger that we face on a daily basis".

Steffan Chirazi of The San Francisco Chronicle noted that the album's second disc is more erratic and angry than the first disc, beginning as it does with the "punky break beats" of "Temper Temper" before moving onto the similarly aggressive "Digital" with KRS-One. Similarly, Vibe's Michael A. Gonzales wrote that the album's second disc is "pure rage with machines", describing "Temper Temper" as "bleak, punk boombastic" that implores Gallagher "to contribute shattering walls of intense guitar feedback while Goldie rants as if he's suffering an emotional breakdown on tape." For Muzik critic Calvin Bush, "Temper Temper" is a "crushing, a molten explosion of jungle-punk", describing Gallagher's riffs as "guitar-staffing".

Less favourably, AllMusic's Stephen Thomas Erlewine believes the track "never quite hits as hard as it should", lacking the impact of Goldie's "gutsy" collaboration with KRS-One, "Digitial". David Browne of Entertainment Weekly deemed it a sluggish track with "wanky guitar squalor" from Gallagher. Reviewing Saturnz Return retrospectively for Louder Than War, Simon Tucker asserts that "Temper Temper" is "overblown thrash ugliness", that, alongside a dark ambient collaboration with David Bowie and the hour-long opening track whereupon Goldie addresses numerous demons from his past, make it "quite frankly astonishing that an actual studio allowed [the album] to be released as it was." Tucker describes "Temper Temper" as an obvious example of Goldie's "fraying" state of mind on Saturnz Return, believing the track "screams of gak overindulgence" and feels like "a snotty little cousin" of Aphex Twin's "Come to Daddy".

== Track listing ==
Side A

1. "Temper Temper"
2. "Temper Temper" (VIP mix)

Side B

1. "Temper Temper" (Grooverider remix)

== Personnel ==
- Goldie – vocals, production, keyboards
- Noel Gallagher – guitars
- Tim Philbert – bass
- Trevor Morais – drums, programming
- Mark Hobbs – engineering, guitars

== Charts ==
Weekly chart performance for "Temper Temper"
| Chart (1998) | Peak position |
|---|---|
| Finland (Suomen virallinen lista) | 19 |
| New Zealand (Recorded Music NZ) | 45 |
| UK Singles (Official Charts) | 13 |
