= Wonderland (event) =

Club night event

Wonderland is a club night concept created and developed by UK-based DJ Pete Tong. In 2007, Wonderland debuted at London's Ministry of Sound; it remained a resident party at the super club. In 2008, Wonderland was launched at Eden in Ibiza, where it spent three seasons.

== History ==
In 2006, Pete Tong started to plan a new club night. He said, "I wanted to create a wondrous club environment filled with exquisite sights, sounds and energy, driven by the music but equally by the visual experience"

The debut Wonderland party was held at London's Ministry of Sound on 3 February 2007, featuring Pete Tong, David Guetta and Paul Harris. This marked the start of regular Wonderland events at Ministry of Sound.

In 2008, Pete Tong ended his four-year Ibiza residency at Pacha to launch Wonderland Ibiza at Eden, located in the resurgent San Antoni area of the White Isle.

The club-night incorporates well established DJ line-ups with a mixture of up-and-coming DJs.

The key to Wonderland’s success, noted by The Times, is its lavish production, including stunning live visuals provided by Microchunk. Special touches ensured that every person left Wonderland with a 360-degree clubbing memory that stood out from the parties on the island.

In 2009, Wonderland maintained attendance from Ibiza audiences, hosting Lady Gaga's Debut Ibiza performance and the second for Deadmau5 and Luciano's Essential Mix recording as part of BBC Radio 1's Ibiza Weekend. Other artists to play throughout the 2009 season included Fatboy Slim, Eric Prydz, Zane Lowe & Mark Ronson, Dub Fire, Simian Mobile Disco, Faithless.

== Wonderland 2010 ==
Wonderland returned to the White Island on 25 June 2010, hosting Bryan Ferry, who for the NME, said, "Ibiza is an island full of surprises and I imagine me playing there must be one of them, However, I have been a big fan of various kinds of dance music for a very long time, and my first visit to Ibiza was more than 30 years ago, so I feel fairly qualified and very enthusiastic about performing there."

== Discography ==
- Pete Tong Wonderland (2 CD)
- Pete Tong Wonderland Volume 2 (2CD)
- Wonderland 2010 (2 CD)
