= Fuse (Everything but the Girl album) =

Studio album by Everything but the Girl
- Released: 21 April 2023
- Recorded: Spring - Summer 2021
- Studios: Riverside Studios (Bath) and home studio
- Genres: Pop; downtempo; R&B
- Length: 35:38
- Labels: Buzzin' Fly; Virgin
- Producers: Ben Watt; Tracey Thorn

Everything but the Girl chronology
Adapt or Die: Ten Years of Remixes (2005)	Fuse (2023)	The Best of Everything But the Girl (2025)

Singles from Fuse
- 1. "Nothing Left to Lose" Released: 10 January 2023; 2. "Caution to the Wind" Released: 22 February 2023; 3. "Run a Red Light" Released: 14 March 2023; 4. "No One Knows We're Dancing" Released: 18 April 2023

Fuse is the eleventh studio album by British duo Everything but the Girl, released on 21 April 2023 through Buzzin' Fly and Virgin Records. It is their first studio album in almost 24 years following Temperamental (1999). The album was preceded by the single "Nothing Left to Lose" on 10 January 2023, followed by "Caution to the Wind", "Run a Red Light", and "No One Knows We're Dancing", in February, March, and April respectively.

== Background ==
The duo began working on the album in March 2021, recording it in secret at both their home and a studio outside of Bath, England with the engineer Bruno Ellingham, with Tracey Thorn stating that they were "aware of the pressures of such a long-awaited comeback, so we tried to begin instead in a spirit of open-minded playfulness".

Ben Watt told NME that they "wanted to come back with something modern-sounding. [...] We just wanted to make a piece of work that would sound great now in 2023. That was the driver." He also elaborated that Fuse is not "a pandemic album or a lockdown album – it just struck us that the time was right after 23 years of waiting", also echoing Thorn's statement that the intention was to be "a bit playful and experimental to see what happens. There wasn't a masterplan."

== Music ==
The album contains a mix of electronic and acoustic tracks, with a statement describing it as a "modern take on the lustrous electronic soul" that the duo produced before their 2000 hiatus. The tracks "When You Mess Up" and "Interior Space" began as "improvised piano ballads" Watt recorded on his iPhone.

== Critical reception ==
Professional ratings
Aggregate scores
Source	Rating
AnyDecentMusic?	7.7/10
Metacritic	80/100
Review scores
Source	Rating
AllMusic	4/5 stars
Clash	9/10
The Guardian	5/5 stars
The Independent	5/5 stars
Mojo	4/5 stars
MusicOMH	4/5 stars
NME	4/5 stars
Pitchfork	7.7/10
Slant Magazine	3/5 stars
Uncut	3/5 stars

Fuse received a score of 80 out of 100 based on 19 critics' reviews on review aggregator Metacritic, indicating "universal acclaim". Paul Simpson of AllMusic wrote that "the duo immediately make it clear that they aren't interested in dwelling in the past", as the album has "sparse, clear production", with Thorn's "roughened" voice adding "more emotional weight to her lyrics, which are as thoughtful as ever, yet especially relevant for the 2020s". Lucy O'Brien of Mojo felt similarly, that Thorn's "voice is front, central and confidently clear in the mix. So too is their cleverly sculpted sonic overload, weaving in and out of evocative lyrical imagery and rhythmic flow".

Alexis Petridis of The Guardian felt that the duo "have absorbed the revolutions in dance and electronic music since their previous album in 1999, and shaped them into melancholic, finely detailed stories", concluding that it is "an album that manages to be different from anything they've recorded before yet perfectly in keeping with their past: a comeback worth waiting for". Helen Brown of The Independent wrote that Fuse "makes a church of its elegant electronica: all vaulting arcs of yearning melody and glimmers of stained glass that dance upwards, to the familiar urban spire of Thorn's beautiful, hangdog voice".

Robin Murray of Clash called it "a graceful, majestic, moving experience, one that dips into club tropes while illuminating pop at its iciest, and most arresting", as well as a "rich, atmospheric song cycle" with "the emotional heft of The Blue Nile and the production nous of Massive Attack". Reviewing the album for Pitchfork, Laura Snapes described Fuse as a "moving, handsome album that tells a sophisticated story about recapturing innocence" and felt that Everything but the Girl had not significantly diverged stylistically from "where they left off, keeping their connection to contemporary club culture alive".

Thomas Smith of NME stated Fuse is "how reunion albums should be done", calling it "the blueprint for any alt-leaning electronic act in the pop space" and finding that the duo "remain both aligned with the pulse and thump of their contemporaries and ahead of the game". Rob Sheffield of Rolling Stone felt that the album "picks up right where Temperamental stopped, as if they're hitting play on a cassette they've kept on pause for 24 years. But they keep it fresh, using the latest digital effects to warp, filter, mutate Thorn's voice into a deeper, more dolorous instrument."

Reviewing the album for MusicOMH, David Murphy opined that "the more prominent the beats, the less exciting the song. But this is Fuse's secret victory: if you don't pay attention, it's harmless background fluff, yet if you concentrate there are mysteries and subtleties to discover that demand repeat listens". Writing for Slant Magazine, Paul Attard found there to be a "weary malaise" on the album, summarising that when it "is firing on all cylinders, it feels risk-averse, leaving one longing for an album that mines its gloomy outlook and ambiance for greater impact".

On 25 April 2024, Everything but the Girl won the "Self-producing artist of the year" award at the Music Producers Guild Awards 2024.

=== Year-end lists ===
	Critic/Publication	List	Rank	Ref.
Fuse
Fuse	The Inquirer	Best Albums of 2023	2	
Fuse	BrooklynVegan	Best Albums of 2023	7	
Fuse	The New York Times	Top 40 Albums of 2023	5	
Fuse	Mojo	The 50 Best Albums of 2023	9	
Fuse	MusicOMH	Top 50 Albums of 2023	12	
Fuse	Rough Trade	Albums of the Year 2023	17	
Fuse	Irish Independent	The Best International Albums of 2023	18	
Fuse	The Independent	The 30 Best Albums of 2023	24	
Fuse	The Guardian	The 50 Best Albums of 2023	28	
Fuse	Rolling Stone	The 100 Best Albums of 2023	46	
Fuse	Allmusic	Favorite Pop Albums	Placed	
Fuse	Slate	The 12 Best Albums of 2023	Placed	
Fuse	Vulture	The Best Albums of 2023	Placed	
"Nothing Left to Lose"
"Nothing Left to Lose"	NME	The 50 Best Songs of 2023	27	
"Nothing Left to Lose"	Pitchfork	Best Songs of 2023	92	
"Nothing Left to Lose"	Pitchfork	The Best Electronic Music of 2023	Placed	
"Nothing Left to Lose"	Billboard	The 30 Best Dance Tracks of 2023	Placed	

== Promotion ==
The album was preceded by four singles, the first of them being the celebrated "Nothing Left to Lose". EBTG announced they wouldn't play live but participated in many interviews and live Q&As events. The only live performance was recorded without public at BBC's Maida Vale studios in April 2023 and released digitally later in August, and physically for Record Store Day in April 2024.

"Nothing Left to Lose", "Run a Red Light" and "No One Knows We're Dancing" were accompanied by a trilogy of music videos directed by Charlie Di Placido (known for his work with Kojey Radical and Jungle), while "Run A Red Light" had an extra video recorded at the Maida Vale Session and directed by Edward Bishop. "Nothing Left to Lose" and "Caution to the Wind" were also remixed by Four Tet and Fka Flash and released as EPs. On August 28, 2026, a 12" of "Run a Red Light", remixed by Logistics along with a dub version of the track, was released by Hospital Records.

== Commercial reception ==
First single "Nothing Left to Lose" received radio rotation and entered several component charts, but missed the Official Singles Charts. It peaked at N° 1 at the Vinyl Singles Chart, N° 2 at the Physical Singles Chart, N° 40 at the Singles Sales Chart, N° 60 at the Singles Download Chart.

During its release week middle-week chart Fuse was leading for a N° 1 position at the Official Albums Chart, but eventually peaked at N° 3, behind A Kiss for the Whole World by Enter Shikari and Live with the BBC Philharmonic Orchestra by The 1975, and top 5 in several component charts. The album is their highest entry on the UK album charts to date.

== Track listing ==
All tracks are written by Ben Watt and Tracey Thorn, except where noted.

Fuse track listing
No.	Title	Length
1.	"Nothing Left to Lose"	3:44
2.	"Run a Red Light" (lyrics and music by Watt)	3:39
3.	"Caution to the Wind"	4:06
4.	"When You Mess Up"	3:48
5.	"Time and Time Again"	2:51
6.	"No One Knows We're Dancing"	4:09
7.	"Lost"	3:25
8.	"Forever"	3:41
9.	"Interior Space"	2:24
10.	"Karaoke"	3:51
Total length:		35:38

At Maida Vale EP track listing
No.	Title	Length
1.	"Nothing Left to Lose" (BBC Maida Vale Session)	3:57
2.	"Run a Red Light" (BBC Maida Vale Session)	3:24
3.	"When You Mess Up" (BBC Maida Vale Session)	4:04
4.	"Single" (BBC Maida Vale Session)	4:50
Total length:		16:16

== Personnel ==
Everything but the Girl

- Tracey Thorn – vocals, background vocals, production, recording arrangement
- Ben Watt – background vocals, drums, electric guitar, piano, programming, synthesizer programming, production, recording arrangement (all tracks); engineering (track 2)

Additional contributors

- Bruno Ellingham – mixing, engineering (all tracks); programming (3, 4, 6, 9)
- Ewan Pearson – programming (6)
- Miles Showell – mastering

== Charts ==
Chart performance for Fuse
Chart (2023)	Peak position
Australian Albums (ARIA)	39
Austrian Albums (Ö3 Austria)	62
Belgian Albums (Ultratop Flanders)	10
Belgian Albums (Ultratop Wallonia)	19
Dutch Albums (Album Top 100)	46
French Albums (SNEP)	52
German Albums (Offizielle Top 100)	18
Irish Albums (Official Charts)	42
Italian Albums (FIMI)	50
New Zealand Albums (RMNZ)	27
Polish Albums (ZPAV)	57
Scottish Albums (Official Charts)	4
Spanish Albums (Promusicae)	38
Swedish Physical Albums (Sverigetopplistan)	16
Swiss Albums (Schweizer Hitparade)	8
UK Albums (Official Charts)	3
US Billboard 200	116
US Independent Albums (Billboard)	18
US Top Alternative Albums (Billboard)	17
US Top Dance Albums (Billboard)	3
US Top Rock & Alternative Albums (Billboard)	27
