= Wrong (Everything but the Girl song) =

1996 single by Everything but the Girl

Single by Everything but the Girl

from the album Walking Wounded
- Released: 17 June 1996
- Genre: Dance-pop; house
- Length: 3:55
- Label: Virgin
- Songwriters: Tracey Thorn; Ben Watt
- Producers: Ben Watt; Todd Terry

Everything but the Girl singles chronology
"Walking Wounded" (1996)	"Wrong" (1996)	"Single" (1996)

Music video
- "Wrong" on YouTube

"Wrong" is a song written and recorded by English musical duo Everything but the Girl. It was released on 17 June 1996, by Virgin Records, as the second single from their ninth album, Walking Wounded (1996). The song topped the US Billboard Dance Club Play chart, reached number two in Italy, and it also entered the top 10 in Canada, Estonia, Hungary, Israel and the United Kingdom.

== Critical reception ==
Larry Flick from Billboard magazine wrote, "Singer Tracey Thorn thrills with a vocal that is a study in 1930s-era torch melodrama but couched with just enough pop restraint to remain accessible to pop radio's young listeners. Although Todd Terry is once again at the remix helm, 'Wrong' is not a mere exercise in duplication. This time, the keyboards are richer and the beats more insistent and African-influenced. The real duplication should be radio's quick acceptance of this pop/dance jewel." Daina Darzin from Cash Box described it as "ethereal" and "undulating". Daisy & Havoc from Music Week's Dance Update gave it a full score of five out of five and named it Tune of the Week, adding, "Everything But The Girl's latest is creepily reminiscent of Fleetwood Mac but that's no criticism, and maybe some new mixes of tracks from 'Rumours' aren't such a bad idea. Or maybe they are ... anyway here you get Todd Terry, Deep Dish and EBTG mixes of a very lovely, very 'Missing'-type song ... and that's no criticism either."

== Track listings ==
- UK and Australian CD single
1. "Wrong" (Todd Terry remix edit) – 3:55
2. "Wrong" (Todd Terry remix) – 6:40
3. "Wrong" (Deep Dish remix) – 12:01
4. "Wrong" (Mood II Swing dub) – 8:52
5. "Wrong" (EBTG original mix) – 4:35
- UK 12-inch single

A1. "Wrong" (Todd Terry remix) – 6:40
A2. "Wrong" (Deep Dish remix) – 12:01
B1. "Wrong" (Mood II Swing dub) – 8:52
B2. "Wrong" (Deep Dish dub) – 11:52

- UK cassette single and European CD single
1. "Wrong" (Todd Terry remix edit) – 3:55
2. "Wrong" (Deep Dish remix edit) – 4:03
- US 12-inch single

A1. "Wrong" (Todd Terry remix) – 6:48
A2. "Wrong" (EBTG original mix) – 4:36
B1. "Wrong" (Deep Dish remix) – 11:30

- US maxi-CD single
1. "Wrong" (EBTG original mix) – 4:36
2. "Wrong" (Todd Terry remix edit) – 3:55
3. "Wrong" (Deep Dish remix edit) – 4:20
4. "Wrong" (Todd Terry remix) – 6:48
5. "Wrong" (Everything but the Drums) – 4:25
6. "Wrong" (Tee's Beats) – 2:25
7. "Wrong" (Deep Dish remix) – 11:30
8. "Wrong" (Deep Dish dub) – 11:43
- US cassette single

A1. "Wrong" (EBTG original mix edit) – 3:55
A2. "Wrong" (Todd Terry remix edit) – 3:55
B1. "Wrong" (EBTG original mix edit) – 3:55
B2. "Wrong" (Deep Dish remix edit) – 4:20

== Charts ==
=== Weekly charts ===
Chart (1996)	Peak position
Australia (ARIA)	36
Belgium (Ultratop 50 Flanders)	44
Canada Top Singles (RPM)	8
Canada Adult Contemporary (RPM)	7
Canada Dance/Urban (RPM)	1
Estonia (Eesti Top 20)	9
Europe (Eurochart Hot 100)	22
France (SNEP)	43
Germany (GfK)	59
Hungary (Mahasz)	10
Iceland (Íslenski Listinn Topp 40)	14
Ireland (IRMA)	20
Israel (Israeli Singles Chart)	3
Italy (Musica e dischi)	2
Italy Airplay (Music & Media)	5
New Zealand (Recorded Music NZ)	29
Scottish Singles Sales (Official Charts)	10
Sweden (Sverigetopplistan)	47
Switzerland (Schweizer Hitparade)	41
UK Singles (Official Charts)	8
UK Club Chart (Music Week)	1
US Billboard Hot 100	68
US Dance Club Songs (Billboard)	1
US Dance Singles Sales (Billboard)	5
US Pop Airplay (Billboard)	38
US Cash Box Top 100	54

=== Year-end charts ===
Chart (1996)	Position
Canada Top Singles (RPM)	76
Canada Adult Contemporary (RPM)	60
Canada Dance/Urban (RPM)	16
UK Airplay (Music Week)	23
UK Club Chart (Music Week)	16
US Dance Club Play (Billboard)	6

== Release history ==
Region	Date	Format(s)	Label(s)	Ref.
United States	7 May 1996	Contemporary hit radio	Atlantic	
United Kingdom	17 June 1996	CD; cassette	Virgin	
United Kingdom	24 June 1996	12-inch vinyl	Virgin	
Japan	7 August 1996	CD	Virgin	

== See also ==
- List of number-one dance singles of 1996 (U.S.)
