= Temperamental (Everything but the Girl album) =

Studio album by Everything but the Girl
- Released: 27 September 1999
- Genres: House; deep house; garage house; trip hop; pop; soul
- Length: 56:47
- Labels: Virgin; Atlantic
- Producers: Ben Watt; Andy Bradfield; Deep Dish; J Majik; Danny Jay

Everything but the Girl chronology
Walking Wounded (1996)	Temperamental (1999)	Like the Deserts Miss the Rain (2003)

Singles from Temperamental
- 1. "The Future of the Future (Stay Gold)" Released: 21 September 1998; 2. "Five Fathoms" Released: 13 September 1999; 3. "Blame" Released: 6 December 1999; 4. "Temperamental" Released: 21 February 2000; 5. "Lullaby of Clubland" Released: 27 November 2000

Temperamental is the tenth studio album by English musical duo Everything but the Girl. It was released on 27 September 1999 and issued by Virgin Records and Atlantic Records. The album was followed by the band's lengthy 24 year hiatus, during which Tracey Thorn and Ben Watt recorded solo albums, until the release of their album Fuse in 2023.

== Background ==
Thorn and Watt recorded Temperamental in the immediate period following the birth of their twin daughters in 1998. Due to Thorn's preoccupation with motherhood, her level of involvement in the creation of the album was scaled back, with Watt taking on a more prominent role in writing lyrics and music. Thorn recorded most of her vocals during late-night studio sessions, after the twins had gone to sleep. In her autobiography Bedsit Disco Queen (2013), she remarked that "in a sense, [she] ended up being guest vocalist on someone else's album".

Watt continued to build on the sound of Everything but the Girl's previous album Walking Wounded (1996), on which the duo worked with electronic music artists such as Howie B and Spring Heel Jack, in producing Temperamental. He incorporated production techniques that he had learned from his three years as a resident DJ at Bar Rumba and Notting Hill Arts Club into the album's songs, including crossfading, back spinning, and filtering.

== Composition ==
AllMusic critic Stephen Thomas Erlewine viewed Temperamental as a continuation of the musical direction pursued by Everything but the Girl on Walking Wounded, merging electronica with elements of folk, jazz, and pop. He described the album's musical style as a minor refinement of that of Walking Wounded, downplaying its drum and bass and trip hop influences in favour of a more house-driven sound. Salon's Amanda Nowinski wrote that Temperamental retains drum and bass breakbeats but is mostly informed by "old-school" garage house, while NME characterised the album as "a left-turn into deep house ambience and trip-hop grooves" that is "punctuated by vulnerable lyrics and vocal performances" from Tracey Thorn. Music journalist Roni Sarig wrote that it explores "various beats and textures while pairing them with soul/pop melodies." Michael White of The Quietus called Temperamental "an aesthetic continuation" of Walking Wounded, "synthesizing the most recent developments of clubland with the duo's intrinsic song-based approach." This reliance on dance music is notable on the album's first single, "The Future of the Future (Stay Gold)", which features Deep Dish and is composed upon a sample of the band's 1996 single "Stay Gold".

Erlewine noted that the songs on Temperamental "are essentially in the singer/songwriter vein" and described the album as a whole as "more of a meditative, reflective piece", while also observing a relative lack of pop hooks compared to Walking Wounded. White remarked on the contrast between the "swaggering urban rhythms" of the music and the deeply introspective nature of the lyrics. "It's not as poppy as Walking Wounded," Thorn would later write, attributing the album's darker and less accessible nature to the circumstances surrounding its creation: "It's like going back to Amplified Heart: you can tell it's made by people who are in a stage of turmoil and change again." Thorn, composing lyrics for Temperamental, found herself unable to articulate her feelings about motherhood and other significant changes occurring in her life at the time, and as a result she instead opted to write from a non-autobiographical standpoint. It has been suggested that much of the material also deals with the duo's feelings towards the fame they had attained, following the success of Todd Terry's remix of their 1994 track "Missing" and Walking Wounded. According to Laura Snapes of Pitchfork, songs such as "The Future of the Future (Stay Gold)" feature "pessimistic lyrics [that] spoke of alienation not just from other people, but from any sense of the past or the future."

== Release and promotion ==
Temperamental was released in most territories on 27 September 1999 by Virgin Records, while in the United States, it was issued the following day by Atlantic Records. By the end of 1999, Temperamental had sold 115,000 copies in the US, according to Billboard. It sold over 500,000 copies worldwide and was met with success in the dance market. Five singles were released from the album: "The Future of the Future (Stay Gold)" on 21 September 1998 (US Dance No. 1, UK No. 31), "Five Fathoms" on 13 September 1999 (US Dance No. 1, UK No. 27), "Blame" on 6 December 1999, "Temperamental" on 21 February 2000 (US Dance No. 1, UK No. 72), and "Lullaby of Clubland" on 27 November 2000 (US Dance No. 3). The tracks were remixed by high profile DJs, such as Kruder & Dorfmeister, Hex Hector and Mac Quayle, Kenny Dope and Deep Dish, as well as Watt himself. Videos were made for "The Future of the Future" (dir. Huds), "Five Fathoms" (dir. Mark Szaszy) and "Temperamental" (dir. Mike Mills).

Everything but the Girl toured the album in the United States and Europe, playing gigs, festivals, and TV shows such as Nulle part ailleurs and Late Night with Conan O'Brien. Their show played at the Montreux Jazz Festival on 15 July 2000 remains the duo's last concert in front of an audience. Since then, Thorn has stated that she has no intention of playing live due to anxiety; she did not do so solo or with Everything but the Girl until 2025.

Temperamental was reissued by Edsel Records as a two-disc deluxe set on 4 September 2015.

== Critical reception ==
Professional ratings
Review scores
Source	Rating
AllMusic	4.5/5 stars
The Boston Phoenix	3.5/4 stars
Entertainment Weekly	B+
Los Angeles Times	3/4 stars
NME	1/10
Pitchfork	5.3/10
Q	3/5 stars
Record Collector	4/5 stars
Rolling Stone	3.5/5 stars
Spin	9/10

Spin critic Barry Walters said that on Temperamental, "EBTG's early bossa-nova folk has been fully transformed into a contemporary sonic physicality that washes the album's desperation with sweaty, regenerative joy", finding that the duo's "radical departure" on Walking Wounded sounds "tentative by comparison." In his review for AllMusic, Stephen Thomas Erlewine wrote that "Temperamental isn't all that different than its predecessor, but its blend of house, electronica, pop, jazz, and folk is equally satisfying as that landmark album." Ernesto Lechner of the Los Angeles Times stated that the duo manages "to dispel any doubts about its validity in the field of ethereal dance music", while in Rolling Stone, Rob Sheffield noted their "elegantly morose songcraft" and concluded, "if Cole Porter had composed a disco song cycle for Dusty Springfield, it might have sounded like this." Daryl Easlea, in a retrospective review for Record Collector, highlighted Thorn's performance on the album, commenting that "her ability to understate emotion is arguably unparalleled in British pop music".

In a more critical assessment, Pitchfork's Ryan Schreiber felt that Everything but the Girl had not progressed musically on Temperamental "despite extreme advances in the sound of electronic music in the three years since Walking Wounded was released". NME reviewer Gill Whyte disparaged the duo's take on house music as "diabolically banal, ersatz coffee-table, piss-weak tinniness", and their lyrics as "nothing more than the moanings of a 30-something, glossy-reading self-help enthusiast".

== Track listing ==
No.	Title	Writer(s)	Length
1.	"Five Fathoms"	Ben Watt	6:24
2.	"Low Tide of the Night"	Watt	4:45
3.	"Blame"	Watt; Tracey Thorn	6:18
4.	"Hatfield 1980"	Watt; Thorn	5:12
5.	"Temperamental"	Watt	5:20
6.	"Compression"	Watt; Thorn	7:11
7.	"Downhill Racer"	Watt; Thorn	3:49
8.	"Lullaby of Clubland"	Watt	5:30
9.	"No Difference"	Watt; Thorn	4:26
10.	"The Future of the Future (Stay Gold)" (with Deep Dish)	Watt; Sharam Tayebi; Ali Shirazinia	7:52
Total length:			56:47

=== 2015 Edsel Records reissue ===
Disc 1
No.	Title	Writer(s)	Length
1.	"Five Fathoms"	Ben Watt	6:24
2.	"Low Tide of the Night"	Watt	4:45
3.	"Blame"	Watt; Tracey Thorn	6:18
4.	"Hatfield 1980"	Watt; Thorn	5:12
5.	"Temperamental"	Watt	5:20
6.	"Compression"	Watt; Thorn	7:11
7.	"Downhill Racer"	Watt; Thorn	3:49
8.	"Lullaby of Clubland"	Watt	5:30
9.	"No Difference"	Watt; Thorn	4:26
10.	"The Future of the Future (Stay Gold)" (with Deep Dish)	Watt; Sharam Tayebi; Ali Shirazinia	7:52
11.	"Firewall" (b-side)	Watt	5:26
12.	"Come In" (demo)	Watt	4:59
13.	"Temperamental" (live at The Forum, London, 1999)	Watt	6:02
Total length:			73:14

Disc 2
No.	Title	Writer(s)	Length
1.	"Five Fathoms" (Club 69 Future Club Mix)	Ben Watt	9:18
2.	"Five Fathoms" (Kevin Yost's Enlightenment Mix)	Watt	7:31
3.	"Temperamental" (Pull's Timewrap Mix)	Watt	6:03
4.	"Temperamental" (Hex Hector & Mac Quayle Revers Drum Dub)	Watt	5:51
5.	"Temperamental" (Wamdue Project Remix)	Watt	14:55
6.	"Blame" (Fabio Remix)	Watt; Thorn	6:54
7.	"Blame" (J Majik VIP Remix)	Watt; Thorn	6:02
8.	"Downhill Racer" (Kenny Dope Remix)	Watt; Thorn	3:31
9.	"Lullaby of a Clubland" (Markus Schulz Tribal Journey)	Watt	7:24
10.	"Lullaby of a Clubland" (Matty Heilbronn II Deep Club Mix)	Watt	7:38
Total length:			75:07

== Personnel ==
Credits are adapted from the album's liner notes.

Everything but the Girl

- Tracey Thorn – vocals
- Ben Watt – bass, guitars, keyboards, strings, beats, scratching, sound editing and programming, mixing, production

Production

- Andy Bradfield – mixing, vocal production on "The Future of the Future (Stay Gold)"
- Ricky Graham – mixing (assistant)
- Geoff Pesche – mastering
- J Majik – additional production on "Blame"
- Danny Jay – additional production on "Blame"
- Deep Dish – mixing, programming, and production on "The Future of the Future (Stay Gold)"

Design

- Dolphin Trax – design
- CJ Field – artwork coordination
- Graham Rounthwaite – cover illustration

== Charts ==
Chart (1999)	Peak position
Australian Albums (ARIA)	3
Belgian Albums (Ultratop Flanders)	48
Canada Top Albums/CDs (RPM)	29
French Albums (SNEP)	18
German Albums (Offizielle Top 100)	65
New Zealand Albums (RMNZ)	17
Scottish Albums (Official Charts)	45
Swedish Albums (Sverigetopplistan)	14
UK Albums (Official Charts)	16
US Billboard 200	65

Chart (2023)	Peak position
UK Dance Albums (Official Charts)	28
