= Bombscare =

Single by 2 Bad Mice

from the EP Hold It Down
- Released: 1991
- Genre: Breakbeat hardcore
- Length: 5:24
- Label: Moving Shadow

"Bombscare" is a track from the 1991 EP Hold It Down by 2 Bad Mice.

It makes heavy use of samples, taking drumbeats then chopping and rearranging them to create a distinctive musical style. The main sample heard is from the song "Don't Mess with This Beat" by Neon; other samples for the breakbeat are from "Let Me Love You (Rebuilt)" by Kariya.

A single was released in the UK in 1996 featuring several remixes of the song. It peaked at No. 46 on the UK Singles Chart.

Alexis Petridis, writing for The Guardian in 2020, listed "Bombscare" at number one in his list of his 25 best early '90s breakbeat hardcore tracks.
