= Robert Haigh (musician) =

British musical artist

Rob Haigh
- Also known as: Omni Trio, Sema, London Steppers, Silent Storm
- Born: Robert Haigh
- Origin: Barnsley, South Yorkshire, England
- Genres: Electronic, jungle, experimental, ambient, drum and bass, industrial (early)
- Occupations: Composer, musician, producer, remixer
- Instruments: Piano, keyboards, synthesiser, drum machine, guitar, bass
- Years active: 1979–present
- Labels: Moving Shadow, Siren, Le Rey Records, L.A.Y.L.A.H. Antirecords, United Dairies, Vinyl On Demand, Primary Numbers, Crouton, Seal Pool, Good Looking Records, EMI

Robert Haigh, also known as Omni Trio, is a British electronic, ambient and experimental musician.

== Career ==
=== Early work (1979–1991) ===
At school, Haigh was in a band called Labyrinth playing original material that was influenced by David Bowie and Roxy Music. In the early 1980s Haigh released a series of experimental ambient albums under the names Robert Haigh and Sema – the most notable being ‘Three Seasons Only’ and ‘Notes From Underground’. He also contributed to several Nurse With Wound projects and formed an industrial avant-funk band called The Truth Club together with Trefor Goronwy, who would go on to join This Heat. In a 1994 feature in The Wire on ambient jungle by Simon Reynolds, Haigh's influences were listed as Pere Ubu, The Pop Group, Can, Faust and Neu! as well as Miles Davis and King Tubby.

=== Omni Trio (1992–2004) ===
In the 1990s, Haigh developed a unique style of what has become known as ‘ambient drum 'n' bass’ and released six EPs and six albums under the name Omni Trio to great acclaim. The Omni Trio sound is notable for its intricate breakbeat patterns, orchestrated production, atmospheric sound palette, sweetly melodic piano vamps, and creative use of sampled soul-diva vocals. Omni Trio was one of the original drum 'n' bass producers, who first released for Moving Shadow as early as 1993. He produced several anthems in the period now known as "old skool", including "Mystic Stepper (Feel Better)", "Renegade Snares", "Thru the Vibe", and "Living for the Future". All of these featured on his acclaimed first LP, The Deepest Cut Vol 1 (1995), which was released under the title Music For The Next Millennium that same year in the US through Sm:)e Communications.

He followed this up with The Haunted Science in 1996, which included the singles "Trippin' on Broken Beats" and "Nu Birth of Cool". Mainstream trends in dancefloor-oriented drum 'n' bass rapidly diverged from his musical style, and subsequent albums Skeleton Keys (1997), the Detroit techno-influenced Byte Size Life (1999), and Even Angels Cast Shadows (2001) produced no big club hits on the scale of his early singles, but they further cemented his reputation as one of the finest album-oriented musicians in the genre. Indeed, he was the first drum'n'bass artist to produce six full-length artist albums.

Many Omni Trio tracks feature on popular video games: "Renegade Snares" appears in the game Midnight Club 3: DUB Edition and Grand Theft Auto: Liberty City Stories, "First Contact" (from Even Angels Cast Shadows) is featured in Grand Theft Auto 3 and "Secret Life" is featured in the futuristic racing video game Rollcage Stage II.

Following the release of the sixth and final Omni Trio album Rogue Satellite in 2004, Haigh decided to cease recording as Omni Trio.

=== Current work (2005–present) ===
Since Omni Trio, Haigh has released a series of modern classical and minimalist albums under his own name: the post Minimalist From the Air (2006) and Written on Water (2008), and the piano works: Notes and Crossings (2009), Anonymous Lights (2010), Strange and Secret Things (2011), and Darkling Streams (2013). On his decision to cease recording as Omni Trio he has said: "After Even Angels Cast Shadows and especially the minimal structures of Rogue Satellite, I felt that perhaps my work was done in this particular area. All along the intention was to do the Omni Trio stuff alongside producing and releasing piano based material under my own name. Then the Omni thing blew up much bigger than I had anticipated. But throughout the '90s I also kept writing piano and minimal themes. By the early 2000s the time seemed right to put the emphasis on developing this material."

In 2014, German label VOD released the compilation album Cold Pieces. This is a companion collection to 2012's Time Will Say Nothing box set. These two compilations represent Haigh's earliest solo output – covering most of the eighties (1982 to 1989.) Where Time Will Say Nothing focused on Haigh's darker and more industrial period, Cold Pieces represents the evolution into more piano based experimentation.

In January 2015, Haigh released an 18 track collection of piano compositions called The Silence Of Ghosts. Much of the material on The Silence of Ghosts is developed from piano improvisation. In a recent interview he states: "Most of my compositions start from freeform improvisation at the piano. Later I revisit the more compelling themes and from there, structures start to emerge. I never use formal notation just the odd rough diagrams and written reminders."

== Discography ==
=== As Sema ===
==== Studio albums ====
- Notes from the Underground (Le Rey, 1982)
- Themes from Hunger (Le Rey, 1982)
- Extract from Rosa Silber (Ley Rey, 1983)

==== Singles ====
- "S. Minor Ghosts" 7" (Marquee Moon, 1982)

==== Compilation albums ====
- Time Will Say Nothing 1982–1984 (Vinyl-On-Demand, 2012)

==== Collaborative recordings ====
- Three Seasons Only with Robert Haigh (Le Rey, 1984)
- In Fractured Silence (United Dairies, 1984)

=== As Robert Haigh ===
==== Studio albums ====
- Valentine Out of Season (United Diaries, 1987)
- A Waltz in Plain C (Le Rey, 1989)
- Written on Water (Crouton, 2008)
- Notes and Crossings (Siren, 2009)
- Anonymous Lights (Siren, 2010)
- Strange and Secret Things (Siren, 2011)
- Darkling Streams (Primary Numbers, 2013)
- The Silence of Ghosts (Siren, 2015)
- Creatures of the Deep (Unseen Worlds, 2017)
- Black Sarabande (Unseen Worlds, 2020)
- Human Remains (Unseen Worlds, 2022)

==== Extended plays ====
- Juliet of the Spirits (L.A.Y.L.A.H., 1985)
- Music from the Ante Chamber (L.A.Y.L.A.H., 1986)

==== Collaborative recordings ====
- Three Seasons Only with Sema (Le Rey, 1984)
- From the Air with Silent Storm (Seal Pool, 2007)

==== Compilation albums ====
- The Best of Robert Haigh (United Diaries, 1987)
- Cold Pieces: 1985-1989 (Vinyl-On-Demand, 2014)

=== As Omni Trio ===
==== Studio albums ====
- The Deepest Cut Vol 1 (Moving Shadow, 1995)
- The Haunted Science (Moving Shadow, 1996)
- Skeleton Keys (Moving Shadow, 1997)
- Byte Size Life (Moving Shadow, 1999)
- Even Angels Cast Shadows (Moving Shadow, 2001)
- Rogue Satellite (Scale, 2004)

==== Singles and EPs ====
- Mystic Steppers (Candidate Records, 1992)
- Mystic Steppers, Volume 2 (Moving Shadow, 1992)
- Volume 3: Renegade Snares (Moving Shadow, 1993)
- Volume 4: Rollin' Heights (Moving Shadow, 1994)
- Volume 5: Soul Promenade (Moving Shadow, 1994)
- Volume 5: Soul Promenade (Remixes) (Moving Shadow, 1994)
- Feel Good '95: The Return of the Mystic Stepper (Moving Shadow, 1994)
- Volume 6: Nu Birth of Cool (Moving Shadow, 1995)
- Volume 7: Beyond the Fundamental (Moving Shadow, 1995)
- Volume 8: Trippin' on Broken Beats (Moving Shadow, 1996)
- Volume 9: Twin Town Karaoke (Moving Shadow, 1997)
- Sanctuary (Moving Shadow, 1997)
- Meltdown (Moving Shadow, 1998)
- Byte Size Life (Moving Shadow, 1999)
- Nu Birth/Breakbeat Etiquette (Moving Shadow, 2000)
- Lucid (The Amalgamation of Soundz Remix) (Moving Shadow, 2001)
- Rouge Satellite (Scale, 2004)

==== Collaborative recordings ====
- "Two on One Issue 2" split 12" with DJ Crystl (Moving Shadow, 1994)
- "Blue Corvette/Station to Station" split 12" with Greenfly and Deep Blue (Good Looking, 2003)

==== Mixes ====
- Moving Shadow 01.2: The Angels and Shadows Project (Moving Shadow, 2001)

==== Compilation albums ====
- Volume 1993–2003 (Moving Shadow, 2003)
- Cut Out Shapes (Rare and Unreleased) (Moving Shadow, 2012)

=== with Truth Club/Fote ===
- Sleight/Looking for Lost Toy 7" (Le Rey, 1980)
- Perfect Sense 12" (Le Rey, 1981)
- Shaking the House 12" (Le Rey, 1981)

=== with Nurse With Wound ===
- The Sylvie and Babs Hi-Fi Companion (L.A.Y.L.A.H., 1985)
- Spiral Insana (Torso, 1986)
- A Sucked Orange (United Dairies, 1989)
