= Moving Shadow =

English electronic music record label

- Founded: 1990
- Founder: Rob Playford
- Genre: Breakbeat hardcore; jungle; drum and bass
- Country of origin: United Kingdom
- Location: Stevenage
- Official website: movingshadow.com

Moving Shadow is an English breakbeat hardcore, jungle and drum and bass record label which was founded in 1990 by Rob Playford.

== History ==
The label began in 1990, operating from Playford's Stevenage home. Playford had become a focal point for local, young artists and bedroom producers seeking advice on releasing their own music following his first three 12 inch vinyl releases.

The label's first release with a 'Shadow' prefixed catalogue number came in 1991; the Psychotronic EP by Earth Leakage Trip. Many artists attributed to early Shadow releases were Playford's aliases or collaborations, such as 2 Bad Mice, a group he formed with Sean O'Keeffe and Simon Colebrooke.

As the rave scene scratched the surface of the mainstream music industry in 1991 and 1992, Moving Shadow, like its friendly rival Suburban Base and D-Zone, enjoyed some UK Singles Chart success through Blame's "Music Takes You" and 2 Bad Mice's "Bombscare".

Moving Shadow's output could be seen at this time to represent the complete spectrum of the genre. The label released albums from both Omni Trio and Foul Play in 1995 and the first of a series of regional compilation albums such as The Revolutionary Generation, Storm from the East and Trans-Central Connection, highlighting artists both local and distantly-located.

In 1994, Playford began working with drum and bass artist Goldie on tracks written using his Rufige Kru alias, after Goldie made contact with Playford about appearing in a documentary he was making. The result was Goldie's Timeless album, produced and engineered by Playford and released in 1995 on the better-funded FFRR Records. The album was one of the first drum and bass titles to achieve mainstream success, going on to be one of the best-selling drum and bass albums of its time.

In 2000, Moving Shadow published a retrospective of their catalogue to date.

Many songs from artists of the label were featured in different Rockstar Games videogames, including Midnight Club 3: Dub Edition., Grand Theft Auto III and Grand Theft Auto: Liberty City Stories. The latter two videogames have a dedicated in-game radio station, named "MSX FM" and "MSX 98", respectively.

The label stopped releasing new artist material in 2006. A digital only release of previously unreleased tracks and versions, "Cut Out Shapes" by "Omni Trio” was released in 2012.

In 2023, Moving Shadow expanded its list of the digital sales platforms servicing its catalogue from Apple's iTunes Store (since 2006) and Beatport (since 2008) to include other download and streaming platforms of the day as well as its own YouTube channel. As of May 2023, the entire Moving Shadow back catalogue is accessible on Spotify.

== Special Release Series' ==
The "Two on One” series was a collection of specially commissioned tracks spread over 9 (12 inch vinyl) releases. Each release featured a guest artist (not signed to the label) on one side of the vinyl and a Moving Shadow artist on the other. The artwork design was split over the 9 releases so as to create one large 3’ x 3' image. Released 7 February 1994 - 26 December 1994.

The "10” series was a limited edition retrospective of the label's popular tracks to date. Released 11 September 2000 - 14 May 2001.

The "MSXEP” series was a collection of double 12 inch vinyl releases featuring new artist and existing Moving Shadow artists alike. Released 3 January 2000 - 20 March 2006.

== See also ==
- List of record labels
- List of electronic music record labels
- List of jungle and drum and bass record labels
