= Solo: Songs and Collaborations 1982–2015 =

Compilation album by Tracey Thorn
- Released: 23 October 2015
- Label: Caroline International

Tracey Thorn chronology
Tinsel and Lights (2012)	Solo: Songs and Collaborations 1982–2015 (2015)	Record (2018)

Solo: Songs and Collaborations 1982–2015 is a compilation album by Tracey Thorn, released in the UK on 23 October 2015. It features 34 tracks spanning her career as a solo artist and includes collaborations with other artists, including The Unbending Trees ("Overture"), Massive Attack ("Protection") and The Style Council ("The Paris Match"). Further collaborations include tracks with Robert Wyatt and Hot Chip. The tracks are arranged over two discs. It is also available as a digital album, and as a shortened single-disc compilation.

== Background ==
Solo: Songs and Collaborations 1982 - 2015 includes tracks from Thorn's four solo albums: A Distant Shore (1982), Out of the Woods (2007), Love and Its Opposite (2010) and Tinsel and Lights (2012). In addition there are also songs that featured on the 2015 film soundtrack "The Falling".

Thorn announced details of her new album at the beginning of October 2015, saying "These tracks represent, on one hand, the moments when I was working as a solo artist outside the constraints and democracy of a band, either recording tracks entirely by myself, or at least being in the driving seat, the one making all the artistic decisions. And on the other hand, those times when I guested with other bands or producers, performing as a featured solo singer, moonlighting from my regular job."

Tracey Thorn enjoyed her greatest commercial success as one half of the duo Everything But The Girl, which she formed with her partner (now husband), Ben Watt. In 1994 their single "Missing" sold 870,000 copies in the UK and is credited as the highest selling single in the UK not to reach the top 2 (it peaked at number 3 in 1994). Prior to Everything But The Girl, Thorn was a member of The Marine Girls, yet she has deliberately not included any tracks from her time with these bands on Solo: Songs and Collaborations 1982 - 2015 saying "‘This album deliberately isn’t called ‘The Best of Tracey Thorn,’ says Tracey of the collection. ‘Many might think my best work was with Everything But The Girl, or the Marine Girls, or that I should at least include some of those tracks. But with any interesting compilation you have to have a story to tell, a unifying theme, and here the idea is contained in the single word of the title, Solo."

== Reception ==
Tracey Thorn did various interviews in the weeks leading up to the release, including an interview with HMV in which she said "that the advent of online connection with people who like your music is quite empowering. I have more direct access to the people out there who are interested in my music than I used to have". The album was also reviewed in The Irish Times.

Solo: Songs and Collaborations 1982–2015 entered the Official UK Albums Chart at number 53 on 30 October.

== Track listing ==
Disc 1
No.	Title	Originally from	Length
1.	"Oh, the Divorces!"	Love and Its Opposite	4:15
2.	"Under the Ivy"	Single release only	2:12
3.	"Small Town Girl"	A Distant Shore	3:55
4.	"Plain Sailing"	A Distant Shore	2:06
5.	"Hands Up to the Ceiling"	Out of the Woods	2:57
6.	"Follow Me Down"	Songs from The Falling	3:00
7.	"Goodbye Joe"	B-side of "Plain Sailing"	2:29
8.	"Hormones"	Love and Its Opposite	3:08
9.	"Taxi Cab"	B-side of "Oh, the Divorces!"	3:57
10.	"Sister Winter"	"Christmas Stocking" free digital download	4:27
11.	"Overture" (Tracey Thorn & The Unbending Trees)	Chemically Happy (Is the New Sad)	4:07
12.	"Kentish Town"	Love and Its Opposite	3:30
13.	"By Piccadilly Station I Sat Down and Wept"	Out of the Woods	2:23
14.	"The Paris Match" (The Style Council featuring Tracey Thorn)	Café Bleu	4:26
15.	"Venceremos - We Will Win" (7" Bossa Version; Working Week featuring Robert Wyatt, Tracey Thorn and Claudia Figueroa)	Single release only	4:40
16.	"How Wild the Wind Blows"	Molly Drake Songs	1:56
17.	"Singles Bar"	Love and Its Opposite	3:29
18.	"The Book of Love"	B-side of "Raise the Roof"	2:48
19.	"Late in the Afternoon"	Love and Its Opposite	3:21
20.	"Joy"	Tinsel and Lights	3:59

Disc 2:
No.	Title	Originally from	Length
1.	"Protection" (7"; Massive Attack featuring Tracey Thorn)	Protection	4:55
2.	"Easy"	Out of the Woods	3:57
3.	"Better Things" (Massive Attack featuring Tracey Thorn)	Protection	4:16
4.	"Night Time"	Night Time EP	3:44
5.	"Raise the Roof" (Beyond the Wizard's Sleeve Re-Animation)	"Raise the Roof" single	6:42
6.	"You Are a Lover" (Clock Opera Remix)	"You Are a Lover" single	5:24
7.	"It's All True" (Escort Extended Remix)	"It's All True" single	5:16
8.	"Grand Canyon" (Ada Remix)	"Grand Canyon" single	8:56
9.	"Why Does the Wind?" (Morgan Geist Remix)	"Why Does the Wind?" single	5:56
10.	"Damage" (Tiefschwarz featuring Tracey Thorn)	Eat Books	4:27
11.	"Without Me" (Tevo Howard Radio Edit; Tevo Howard featuring Tracey Thorn)	Single release only	4:02
12.	"King's Cross" (Hot Chip Remix)	Single release only	6:45
13.	"Swimming" (Visionquest Remix)	Opposites EP	9:08
14.	"The Tree Knows Everything" (Adam F featuring Tracey Thorn)	Colours	4:19

=== One-disc edition ===
No.	Title	Length
1.	"Oh, the Divorces!"	4:15
2.	"Under the Ivy"	2:12
3.	"Small Town Girl"	3:55
4.	"Plain Sailing"	2:06
5.	"Hands Up to the Ceiling"	2:57
6.	"Follow Me Down"	3:00
7.	"Hormones"	3:08
8.	"Sister Winter"	4:27
9.	"Overture" (Tracey Thorn & The Unbending Trees)	4:07
10.	"By Piccadilly Station I Sat Down and Wept"	2:23
11.	"The Paris Match" (The Style Council featuring Tracey Thorn)	4:26
12.	"Venceremos - We Will Win" (7" Bossa Version; Working Week featuring Robert Wyatt, Tracey Thorn and Claudia Figueroa)	4:40
13.	"Protection" (7"; Massive Attack featuring Tracey Thorn)	4:55
14.	"Easy"	3:57
15.	"Better Things" (Massive Attack featuring Tracey Thorn)	4:16
16.	"Raise the Roof" (Beyond the Wizard's Sleeve Re-Animation)	6:42
17.	"It's All True" (Escort Extended Remix)	5:16
18.	"Grand Canyon" (Ada Remix)	8:56
