= It's All True (song) =

Single by Tracey Thorn

from the album Out of the Woods
- Released: February 2007 (worldwide); 17 April 2007 (US Digital)
- Genre: Electropop, dance-pop
- Length: 4:13 (Album Version); 3:33 (Radio Edit)
- Label: Virgin Records
- Songwriters: Tracey Thorn; Darshan Jesrani; Klas-Henrik Lindblad; Ewan Pearson
- Producers: Darshan Jesrani; Klas-Henrik Lindblad; Ewan Pearson

Tracey Thorn singles chronology
"Plain Sailing" (1982)	"It's All True" (2007)	"Raise the Roof" (2007)

"It's All True" is the first single from singer Tracey Thorn's solo album, Out of the Woods, released in February 2007.

== Recording and release ==
"It's All True" is one of seven songs on the album all produced by Ewan Pearson. The music was co-written and produced by Klas-henrik "Sasse" Lindblad and Darshan Jesrani of Metro Area. A digital EP also includes a cover version of "King's Cross" by the Pet Shop Boys.

Music critic Paul Flynn, reviewing the Out of the Woods solo set, praised both the song and its place on the album; "The spare and glittery electro grooves of single It's All True, borrowed with affection from shrink-wrapped old Sleeping Bag 12-inch singles, is a neat bridge into the warm, languid funk of her reinterpretation of Arthur Russell's Get Around to It."

Martin Buttrich's vocal mix of the single premiered on 24 November 2006, on Ben Watt's online radio show, Buzzin' Fly. The album mix was subsequently released on Tracey Thorn's official Myspace page in early December 2006.

Thorn describes "It's All True" as "pure early 80s New York dance pop." It reached number one on the "Cool Cuts" chart in the UK for the week of 23 December 2006 and reached number 75 on the UK Singles Chart.

== Music video ==
The music video for "It's All True", directed by Si and Ad, was released in early February 2007. The video features a full-scale room of office workers dancing at their desks. Thorn is seen only from a distance. Thorn is quoted saying, "it features a heavily stylised monochromatic dance routine, in which I feature almost invisibly... (which suits me just fine)."

== UK CD track list ==
CD1

1. "It's All True" (Radio Edit)
2. "It's All True" (Escort Remix)

CD2

1. "It's All True" (Album Version)
2. "It's All True" (Escort Extended Remix)
3. "It's All True" (Martin Buttrich Remix)
4. "It's All True" (DSE Dub)
5. "It's All True" (Music video)

== Official versions ==
Digital download

1. It's All True (Escort Extended Remix) (5:15)
2. It's All True (Kris Menace Remix Full Vocal) (5:11)
3. Kings Cross 4:28

UK Promo CD 1

1. It's All True (Radio Edit) (3:33)
2. It's All True (Album Version) (4:13)
3. It's All True (Kris Menace Full Vocal Remix Edit) (3:13)
4. It's All True (Instrumental) (3:34)

UK Promo CD 2

1. It's All True (Original Full Length) (4:14)
2. It's All True (DSE Dub) (6:29)
3. It's All True (Kris Menace Remix) (6:37)
4. It's All True (Kris Menace Remix Full Vocal) (5:11)
5. It's All True (Martin Buttrich Remix) (9:13)
6. It's All True (Martin Buttrich Instrumental) (9:12)
7. It's All True (Martin Buttrich Dub) (9:27)
8. It's All True (Escort Extended Remix) (5:15)

UK Promo CD 3

1. It's All True (Original Full Length) (4:14)
2. It's All True (DSE Dub) (6:29)
3. It's All True (Kris Menace Remix) (6:37)
4. It's All True (Kris Menace Remix Full Vocal) (5:11)
5. It's All True (Martin Buttrich Remix) (9:13)
6. It's All True (Martin Buttrich Dub) (9:27)
7. It's All True (Escort Extended Remix) (5:15)

UK Promo 12" #1

1. A1 It's All True (DSE Dub) (6:44)
2. A2 It's All True (Kris Menace Remix) (6:37)
3. B It's All True (Martin Buttrich Dub) (9:23)

UK Promo 12" #2

1. A1 It's All True (Original Mix) (4:13)
2. A2 It's All True (Escort Extended Remix) (5:16)
3. B It's All True (Martin Buttrich Remix) (9:10)

UK 12"

1. A1 It's All True (DSE Dub)
2. A2 It's All True (Kris Menace Remix)
3. B1 It's All True (Martin Buttrich Dub)
4. B2 It's All True (Escort Extended Remix)
