= Tinsel and Lights =

2012 album by Tracey Thorn

Studio album by Tracey Thorn
- Released: 29 October 2012
- Genre: Christmas
- Length: 37:13
- Label: Strange Feeling; Merge
- Producer: Ewan Pearson

Tracey Thorn chronology
Love and Its Opposite (2010)	Tinsel and Lights (2012)	Solo: Songs and Collaborations 1982–2015 (2015)

Tinsel and Lights is a Christmas album by British singer Tracey Thorn. It was released on 29 October 2012 on Strange Feeling and Merge Records. It is her fourth solo studio album.

The album mostly avoids canonical Christmas songs, but instead features covers of songs by Sufjan Stevens, Joni Mitchell, Randy Newman, Ron Sexsmith and the White Stripes as well as self-penned songs. Scritti Politti's Green Gartside features on a cover of Low's "Taking Down the Tree", as well as writing "Snow in Sun". Ben Watt, who is Thorn's husband and partner in Everything but the Girl, plays on most tracks, and their three children provide backing vocals on the track "Joy".

Tinsel and Lights entered the UK Album charts at number 94 on the 10 November 2012

An expanded version was released via iTunes. In addition to the original 12 tracks, it added "25th December" (originally performed by Ben Watt on EBTG's "Amplified Heart" album) as well as acoustic versions of "Joy", "River", and "Tinsel and Lights".

== Critical reception ==
Professional ratings
Aggregate scores
Source	Rating
Metacritic	76/100
Review scores
Source	Rating
AllMusic	4/5 stars
Consequence of Sound	3.5/5 stars
Exclaim!	7/10
The Guardian	4/5 stars
musicOMH	4/5 stars
Now	4/5 stars
The Observer	4/5 stars
Pitchfork	6.2/10
Q	4/5 stars
Uncut	8/10

Tinsel and Lights received many favourable reviews around the time of its release including a review in The Guardian and the BBC

== Track listing ==
No.	Title	Writer(s)	Length
1.	"Joy"	Tracey Thorn	4:00
2.	"Hard Candy Christmas"	Carol Hall	3:24
3.	"Like a Snowman"	Stephin Merritt	2:38
4.	"Maybe This Christmas"	Ron Sexsmith	2:11
5.	"In the Cold, Cold Night"	Jack White	2:38
6.	"Snow"	Randy Newman	2:39
7.	"Snow in Sun"	Green Gartside	2:18
8.	"Have Yourself a Merry Little Christmas"	Ralph Blane, Hugh Martin	3:16
9.	"Tinsel and Lights"	Tracey Thorn	3:26
10.	"River"	Joni Mitchell	3:24
11.	"Taking Down the Tree"	Alan Sparhawk, Mimi Parker, Tracey Thorn	4:10
12.	"Sister Winter"	Sufjan Stevens	4:29

== Charts ==
Chart	Peak position
Belgian Albums (Ultratop Flanders)	169
Swedish Albums (Sverigetopplistan)	58
UK Albums (OCC)	94
US Heatseekers Albums (Billboard)	3
US Independent Albums (Billboard)	22
