= Balázs Havasi =

Hungarian pianist and composer (born 1975)

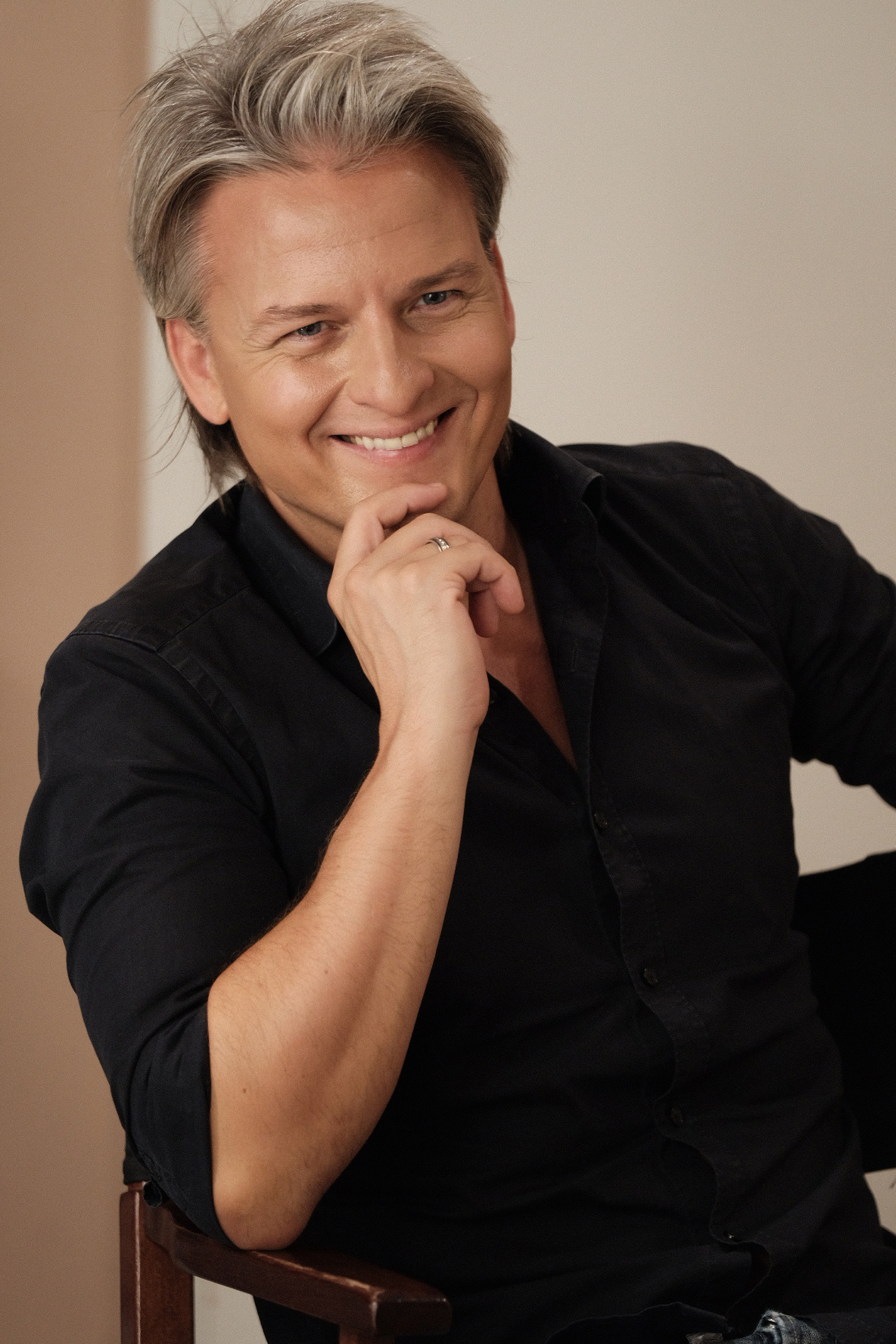

Background information
- Also known as: HAVASI
- Born: 18 September 1975 (age 50); Hungary
- Genres: Solo piano, world classical music, Drum & Piano project
- Occupations: Pianist, composer
- Instrument: Piano
- Website: havasi.eu

Balázs Havasi (born 18 September 1975) is a Hungarian pianist and composer. As a contemporary composer, he has founded four different musical projects, including compositions for a symphony orchestra, rock drums, and piano.

== Education ==
Havasi first played the piano at the age of 4. In 1996, at the age of 21, he was already a teacher at Weiner Leó Conservatory. He then went on to study at Franz Liszt Academy of Music. His professors included then rector Sándor Falvai and Jenő Jandó. During his years at the Academy of Music, Havasi won first prize at a piano competition of Yamaha Foundation of Europe. His musical development and career arc has been compared to Elton John.

== Early albums (2000–2005) ==
In 2000, Havasi signed a five-year exclusive record contract with EMI. During the term of his EMI contract, he produced two soundtrack albums. Havasi did not extend the contract, instead establishing his own record company. Between 2005 and 2008, Havasi self-released the four solo piano albums Piano, Seven, Infinity, and RED.

== The Unbending Trees ==
Havasi founded the band The Unbending Trees with singer-lyricist Kristóf Hajós in 2006. The band was offered its first record contract by British record publisher and producer Ben Watt, and soon released its first album called Chemically Happy (Is The New Sad). Hajós wrote lyrics to the music of Havasi on the album. The Unbending Trees made its debut in London in 2007 and its first four-song EP was called "The First Day". Later, their song "You Are A Lover" was reworked by British singer Tracey Thorn. The Guardian newspaper said of the collaboration that they found it "utterly beguiling". Their second album titled Meteor was released in 2013.

== Havasi Symphonic Production ==
At his concert held in Dubai in May 2008, Havasi met musical producer Csaba Marjai, and the two began to collaborate on creating the Havasi Symphonic Production, which made its debut in the Grand Hall of the Hungarian Academy of Music in 2009. The production featured nearly 100 artists, Dohnányi Symphony Orchestra and Budapest Academic Choir Society, together with almost 20 soloists of world music. At the premiere Havasi hit the same piano key 498 times in a single minute, surpassing the previous world record of 200. Verified by high definition camera, Guinness World Records Board awarded Havasi the title The Fastest Pianist of the World. The Havasi Symphonic Production has eleven platinum records. The Association of Hungarian Record Companies nominated the Havasi Symphonic album to the award 'Domestic Contemporary Classical Music Album of the Year'. As a part of his performances, he has collaborated with artists including Lisa Gerrard, Lebo M, Karl Jenkins, Leona Lewis, Ronan Keating, and Youssou N'Dour. and the Blue.

== Cultural Bridge Project ==
In 2010, Havasi launched a large-scale cultural project, to pay tribute to his grandparents and build a cultural bridge between China and Europe. It debuted in Budapest in 2011. Led by Havasi, European and Hungarian musicians gave a joint artistic performance with Yunnan Art Group from China. About 150 entertainers appeared on stage at the same time.

== Drum&Piano ==
Havasi launched the Drum&Piano Project with his friend, percussionist Endi Kiss. The project is based on a project first performed at the TED Global conference in Scotland. The pairing have continued to tour through the mid-2010s.

== Universal Music Group ==
Havasi signed a global recording agreement with Universal Music Group (UMG) in February, 2022. This new agreement is effective across Havasi's future recorded music, merchandising and brand partnerships. The agreement makes Havasi’s entire catalogue of 13 albums available digitally for the first time.

== Notable performances ==
In 2010, Havasi performed at the Shanghai World Expo Center with the Shanghai Symphony Orchestra during the World Expo. Aired by Chinese Central Television, the concert was seen by an estimated 200 million viewers. In 2011, he performed at Trieste's Verdi Theatre. The event was broadcast by Rai Uno. At a series of four concerts held at Papp Laszlo Sports Arena in Budapest around this time, he performed in front of an audience of 46,000 people. In 2016, Havasi performed at the Wiener Stadthalle in Vienna. In 2017, Havasi performed at the Sydney Opera House, Romania, and the Mercedes-Benz Arena in Berlin. In 2018 Havasi performed at the Tauron Arena in Krakow, Ergo Arena in Gdansk, and The Barbican in London. In 2019, Havasi became the first Hungarian musician to headline a concert at Wembley Arena in London, UK. On 29 December 2020 he broadcast a show online from the empty Budapest Arena to more than 80 countries. In 2021 Havasi made his North American debut of his Symphonic Concert Show, and became the first Eastern-European artist to sell out the Hard Rock Live in Hollywood, Florida. In March, 2022 Havasi performed at the Dubai Expo, and had a sold out concert at the Dubai Opera. On May 8, 2023 the HAVASI production held a symphonic show in the Royal Albert Hall. It marked the first time that a Hungarian composer presented an entire concert of his original compositions at Royal Albert Hall. In honor of King Charles III’s coronation festivities the composer curated a unique program.

== Discography ==
- Confessions on Piano (2001)
- Seasons (2001)
- Sounds Of The Heart (2003)
- Best of Havasi (2004)
- Days and Nights (2004)
- Piano (2005)
- 7 (Seven) (CD+DVD) (2006)
- Infinity (2007)
- Red (2010)
- Symphonic (CD) (2010)
- Symphonic (DVD) (2010)
- Drum and Piano (CD + DVD) (2011)
- Brush and Piano (CD) (2012)
- Symphonic II (2013)
- Hypnotic (2016)
- Solo Piano Etuds No. 1-13 (2017)
- Pure Piano (2017)
- Symphonic Live (2018)
- Rebirth (CD) (2018)
- The World Of Havasi (2022)
- Metamorphosis (2023)
