= Sly (Massive Attack song) =

1994 single by Massive Attack

Single by Massive Attack

from the album Protection
- Released: 17 October 1994
- Genre: Trip hop; R&B
- Length: 5:25 (album version); 4:56 (single edit)
- Label: Wild Bunch; Circa
- Songwriters: Andrew Vowles; Robert Del Naja; Grant Marshall; Nellee Hooper; Nicolette Suwoton; Vivien Goldman
- Producers: Andrew Vowles; Robert Del Naja; Grant Marshall; Nellee Hooper

Massive Attack singles chronology
"Massive Attack (EP)" (1992)	"Sly" (1994)	"Protection" (1995)

Music video
- "Sly" on YouTube

"Sly" is a song by British trip hop collective Massive Attack. It was released as a first single from their second album, Protection (1994), on 17 October 1994 by Wild Bunch and Circa Records. Vocals on the track are performed by Scottish singer-songwriter Nicolette. "Sly" reached number 24 in the United Kingdom, becoming Massive Attack's fourth top-40 single there. The accompanying music video was directed by Stéphane Sednaoui and filmed in New York City.

== Background ==
"Sly" was the combination of Craig Armstrong's strings combined with Nicolette's vocals. After hearing her first album Now is Early, and being suitably impressed by it, Massive Attack chose Nicolette to appear on Protection.

== Critical reception ==
Push from Melody Maker felt releasing the song as the first single from the Protection album was "the smartest choice", praising the "dreamy-voices" by Nicolette. He concluded, "Thumbs up." Robbert Tilli from Music & Media described it as "slowly-creeping". Andy Beevers from Music Week gave it a score of four out of five and named it a "moody, downbeat song". Dele Fadele from NME wrote, "'Sly' finds Nigerian-born Nicolette trilling on in a sultry and wistful manner about time-travel, fate and destiny whilst the string-laden, mid-tempo backdrop conjures up images of the South Seas Pacific and somewhere more devastated and ominous. The overall effect is of putting your ears close to a sea shell and hearing clear, chiming, harmonic bells; as dazzling as that." Brad Beatnik from the Record Mirror Dance Update remarked the singer's "sultry and jazzy vocals" on "a beautiful moody tune that won't be easy to fit in a set (although times are changing fast in clubland)."

== Music video ==
The music video for "Sly" was directed by French music video director, photographer, film producer and actor Stéphane Sednaoui, and produced by Line Postmyr for Propaganda. It was filmed in New York City and released on 17 October 1994. In the video, three mysterious storylines merge.

== Track listings ==
- UK CD1 and cassette single; Australian CD single
1. "Sly" (7-inch edit) – 4:10
2. "Sly" (7 Stones mix) – 5:58
3. "Sly" (Underdog mix) – 5:19
4. "Sly" (Underdog double bass & a cappella) – 3:36
- UK CD2
1. "Sly" (album version) – 5:24
2. "Sly" (Underdog version) – 4:29
3. "Sly" (Cosmic dub) – 5:26
4. "Sly" (Eternal Feedback dub) – 6:23
- UK 12-inch single

A1. "Sly" (7 Stones mix) – 5:58
A2. "Sly" (Underdog mix) – 5:19
B1. "Sly" (Cosmic dub) – 5:26
B2. "Sly" (album version) – 5:24
B3. "Sly" (Eternal Feedback dub) – 6:23

- European CD single
1. "Sly" (7-inch edit) – 4:10
2. "Sly" (7 Stones mix) – 5:58
- US maxi-CD single
1. "Sly" (7-inch edit)
2. "Sly" (7 Stones mix)
3. "Sly" (Underdog mix)
4. "Sly" (Cosmic dub)
5. "Karmacoma" (LP version)

== Charts ==
Chart (1994)	Peak position
Australia (ARIA)	98
Europe (Eurochart Hot 100)	77
Europe (European Dance Radio)	20
Scottish Singles Sales (Official Charts)	29
UK Singles (Official Charts)	24

== Release history ==
Region	Date	Format(s)	Label(s)	Ref.
United Kingdom	17 October 1994	12-inch vinyl; CD; cassette	Wild Bunch; Circa	
Australia	14 November 1994	CD; cassette	Wild Bunch; Circa	
