= Record (Tracey Thorn album) =

Studio album by Tracey Thorn
- Released: 2 March 2018
- Genre: Synth-pop
- Length: 35:45
- Label: Merge
- Producer: Ewan Pearson

Tracey Thorn chronology
Solo: Songs and Collaborations 1982–2015 (2015)	Record (2018)

Record is the fifth solo studio album by English singer and songwriter Tracey Thorn. It was recorded by Thorn with producer Ewan Pearson and a number of backing musicians, including singers Shura and Corinne Bailey Rae, drummer Stella Mozgawa, bassist Jenny Lee Lindberg, and guitarist Jono Ma. The album released by Merge Records on 2 March 2018 to mostly positive reviews from critics.

== Critical reception ==
Professional ratings
Aggregate scores
Source	Rating
AnyDecentMusic?	7.3/10
Metacritic	77/100
Review scores
Source	Rating
AllMusic	4/5 stars
The Daily Telegraph	4/5 stars
The Guardian	4/5 stars
The Independent	3/5 stars
The Irish Times	4/5 stars
The Observer	4/5 stars
Pitchfork	8.0/10
Q	3/5 stars
Rolling Stone	3.5/5 stars
Vice (Expert Witness)	A−

Writing for Pitchfork, music journalist Laura Snapes described Record as "one of the defining albums of [Thorn's] 38-year career", while Rolling Stone critic Rob Sheffield said "Thorn's Synth-Pop 'Record' Delivers Sisterly Passion, Wry Wisdom". Robert Christgau wrote in his review for Vice: "Calm, deliberate, undemonstrative, Thorn is a singer some find magical and others prosaic. I've always tended other, but when a 55-year-old wife and mother claims she's recorded 'nine feminist bangers,' I pay attention. And these definitely work up some fairy dust. The beats evoke without mimicking the subtle electro-dance of Thorn and her beatmaking husband Ben Watt's 20th-century band, Everything but the Girl, and in her undemonstrative way, she sequences the catchiest tracks last ['Face' and 'Dancefloor']".

== Track listing ==
All tracks are written by Tracey Thorn

No.	Title	Length
1.	"Queen"	4:17
2.	"Air" (featuring Shura)	3:03
3.	"Guitar"	2:33
4.	"Smoke"	4:11
5.	"Sister" (featuring Corinne Bailey Rae)	8:32
6.	"Go"	4:01
7.	"Babies"	2:34
8.	"Face"	3:41
9.	"Dancefloor"	2:57

Japanese edition bonus track
No.	Title	Length
10.	"Sister (Andrew Weatherall Remix)"	9:36

== Charts ==
Chart	Peak position
Belgian Albums (Ultratop Flanders)	100
Spanish Albums (PROMUSICAE)	50
Swiss Albums (Schweizer Hitparade)	100
UK Albums (OCC)	15
US Heatseekers Albums (Billboard)	1
US Independent Albums (Billboard)	11
