= Love and Its Opposite =

2010 album by Tracey Thorn

Studio album by Tracey Thorn
- Released: 17 May 2010
- Genre: Chamber folk
- Length: 37:33
- Label: Strange Feeling; Merge
- Producer: Tracey Thorn; Ewan Pearson

Tracey Thorn chronology
Out of the Woods (2007)	Love and Its Opposite (2010)	Tinsel and Lights (2012)

Love and Its Opposite is the third solo studio album by former Everything but the Girl singer Tracey Thorn, released on 17 May 2010. The album was released on Thorn's husband Ben Watt's label Strange Feeling in the UK, and on Merge Records in North America. It was produced by Ewan Pearson, who also produced tracks on Thorn's previous album Out of the Woods. The album peaked at number 51 in the UK Albums Chart.

An EP of remixes, Opposites, was released digitally on 24 August 2010.

== Background ==
Love and Its Opposite was recorded in Berlin and London, and features guest contributions from Hot Chip's Al Doyle, The Invisible's Leo Taylor, Swedish singer-songwriter Jens Lekman, Nashville musician Cortney Tidwell and Los Valentinos' guitarist Jono. It contains eight original songs and two cover versions: Lee Hazlewood's "Come on Home to Me" (a duet with Jens Lekman) and "You Are a Lover" by The Unbending Trees (with whom Thorn collaborated in 2008).

The album's opening track, "Oh, the Divorces!", was made available as a free digital download on 17 February 2010, along with the confirmation of the album's track list. "Why Does the Wind?" and "You Are a Lover" were released as singles later in 2010 and 2011, respectively, accompanied by several remixes. The remix EP Opposites included versions of the album tracks "Late in the Afternoon," "Swimming," and "Kentish Town," and in 2011 Thorn released the Night Time EP with a cover version of The xx's "Night Time" and new mixes of "Swimming."

Thorn has described the theme of the album as "a record about the person I am now and the people around me ... about real life after forty."

The cover art was designed by John Gilsenan.

== Critical reception ==
Professional ratings
Aggregate scores
Source	Rating
AnyDecentMusic?	7.0/10
Metacritic	77/100
Review scores
Source	Rating
AllMusic	4/5 stars
The A.V. Club	B
Billboard	4.5/5 stars
The Daily Telegraph	4/5 stars
The Guardian	4/5 stars
The Irish Times	3/5 stars
Mojo	4/5 stars
Pitchfork	6.9/10
Q	3/5 stars
Uncut	4/5 stars

At Metacritic, which assigns a weighted average score out of 100 to reviews from mainstream critics, the album received an average score of 77, based on 17 reviews, indicating "generally favorable reviews".

== Track listing ==
All tracks are written by Tracey Thorn, except when noted

No.	Title	Writer(s)	Length
1.	"Oh, the Divorces!"		4:15
2.	"Long White Dress"		3:53
3.	"Hormones"		3:08
4.	"Kentish Town"		3:30
5.	"Why Does the Wind?"		5:01
6.	"You Are a Lover"	Kristóf Hajós, Balázs Havasi	3:12
7.	"Singles Bar"		3:28
8.	"Come on Home to Me"	Lee Hazlewood	3:34
9.	"Late in the Afternoon"		3:21
10.	"Swimming"		4:18

Amazon.com edition bonus track
No.	Title	Writer(s)	Length
11.	"Child Star"	Ron Sexsmith	2:41

== Charts ==
Chart	Peak position
Swedish Albums (Sverigetopplistan)	22
UK Albums (OCC)	51
US Billboard 200	144
US Heatseekers Albums (Billboard)	2
US Independent Albums (Billboard)	26
