= Hendra (album) =

Studio album by Ben Watt
- Released: 14 April 2014
- Recorded: Berlin and London 2013
- Genre: Acoustic, downtempo
- Length: 44:10
- Label: Unmade Road, under exclusive license to Caroline International
- Producer: Ewan Pearson

Ben Watt chronology
North Marine Drive (1983)	Hendra (2014)	Fever Dream (2016)

Professional ratings
Aggregate scores
Source	Rating
Metacritic	78/100
Review scores
Source	Rating
AllMusic	4/5 stars
The Guardian	4/5 stars
The Line of Best Fit	8/10
Mojo	4/5 stars
The Observer	4/5 stars
Q	4/5 stars
Resident Advisor	4.0/5
Rolling Stone	3.5/5 stars
The Telegraph	4/5 stars
Uncut	4/5 stars

Hendra is the second studio album released by the English singer, author and multi-instrumentalist Ben Watt on 15 April 2014 through Unmade Road, under exclusive license to Caroline International. The record is a collaboration with Bernard Butler and features a guest-appearance by David Gilmour on slide guitar and backing vocals on "The Levels".

This is Watt's first solo album for three-decades since his 1983's debut, North Marine Drive.

During an interview in 2014, Watt stated the following regarding the album's title:

"My sister died just shortly after finishing my last book and it was a big shock. She’d led a very simple life as a shopkeeper at a simple village store and lived quite a claustrophobic life. Whenever she’d try to get away she went to this little house on the edge of Cornwall called Hendra. When she died I did some research on the name and found that it’s an old Cornish word for home. It had this odd lyrical quality to it. When I found the actual meaning it seemed like the perfect title for the record."

== Track listing ==
All tracks are written by Ben Watt.

No.	Title	Length
1.	"Hendra"	3:22
2.	"Forget"	5:13
3.	"Spring"	3:55
4.	"Golden Ratio"	5:13
5.	"Matthew Arnold's Field"	4:31
6.	"The Gun"	5:34
7.	"Nathaniel"	4:46
8.	"The Levels"	3:59
9.	"Young Man's Game"	2:52
10.	"The Heart Is a Mirror"	4:45

=== Bonus tracks (Deluxe Edition) ===
All tracks are written by Ben Watt.

No.	Title	Length
11.	"Hendra" (demo)
12.	"Spring" (demo)
13.	"Young Man's Game" (demo)
14.	"Forget" (live)
