= Vector Lovers =

British electronic music producer (1969–2026)

- Born: 22 July 1969
- Origin: British
- Died: 18 September 2026 (aged 57)
- Genres: Electronica; house
- Occupations: Disc jockey Record producer Record label owner

Martin Wheeler (22 July 1969 – 18 September 2026), better known by the stage name Vector Lovers, was a British electronic music producer. Wheeler, as described by Soma Records was a "computer nerd" and "80s-obsessed knob-twiddler" who created music which fell into the intelligent dance music (IDM) and electro genres. His music has been compared to and was influenced by such acts as Kraftwerk and Depeche Mode.

As Vector Lovers, Wheeler released several singles and EPs, as well as four albums. Early Vector Lovers' releases were through his own Iwari record label (one very early release was made as 'Balloon'—the name was changed to Vector Lovers when he discovered that there already was a band called Balloon). Music was also released under the names Rosenbaum and Badly Born Droid.

In 2006, Wheeler contributed production duties to Tracey Thorn's album Out of the Woods, released in March 2007.

In July 2025, Wheeler posted on Twitter that he was diagnosed with mesothelioma as a result of asbestos exposure. He died on 18 September 2026, aged 57.

== Discography ==
=== Albums ===
- Vector Lovers (2004)
- Capsule For One (2005)
- Afterglow (2007)
- Electrospective (2011)
- iPhonica (2013)
- Capsule For One (Special Edition) (2022)

=== EPs ===
- Roboto Ashido Funk (2003)
- Electrobotik Disco (2004)
- Suicide Android (2004)
- Comptrfnk (2005)
- Boulevard (2005)
- Microtron (2005)
- Piano Dust (2007)
- Raumklang (2008)
- Ping Pong (2008)
- Remixed & Remastered 01 (2011)
- Solistice (2015)
- Carousel (2016)
- Pale Blue Star (2017)
- Road / To Ruin (2018)

=== Singles ===
- "Post Arctic Industries" (2006)
- "A Field" (2007)
- "Late Shift" / "Babette" (2008)
- "Night Train Memories" (2012)
- "Kissing Princess Leia" (2015 mix) (2015)
- "Night Riding (Crash Premonition)" (2017)
