= Marine Girls =

English post-punk group

- Origin: Hatfield, Hertfordshire, England
- Genres: Post-punk; indie pop; twee pop; lo-fi
- Years active: 1980–1983
- Labels: Whaam! Cherry Red; Cooking Vinyl
- Past members: Tracey Thorn (1980–1983); Jane Fox (1980–1983); Alice Fox (1981–1983); Gina Hartman (1980–1981)
- Website: Label Page

Marine Girls were an English post-punk group from Hatfield, Hertfordshire, England. The group was formed in 1980, by two sixth form schoolfriends; Tracey Thorn and Gina Hartman. Originally, Thorn just played guitar and Hartman was the lead vocalist and percussionist. Thorn overcame her shyness and started singing too by the time they started making records. They were later joined by Jane Fox on bass and her younger sister, Alice, on joint vocals and percussion.

== History ==
Contemporaries of acts such as Young Marble Giants and The Raincoats, the group applied the DIY ethic of the time to record a self-produced and self-released cassette called A Day by the Sea. This features otherwise-unavailable songs such as "Getting Away from It All", "Lorna", "Hour of Need" and "Harbours".

They went on to record an album called Beach Party which was recorded in a garden shed by Pat Bermingham, and released on In-Phaze then re-released by Dan Treacy of Television Personalities for his label Whaam! Records. In October 1981, Thorn moved to Hull to attend university, and Hartman left the band in 1981 to pursue other musical projects whilst the Fox sisters both went on to art school in Brighton. The group still performed together and released a second album, Lazy Ways, in April 1983. It was ranked at number 42 among the "Albums of the Year" by NME.

Marine Girls recorded two Peel Sessions. Their first, from 1982, contains five songs; "Don't Come Back", "Love to Know", "He Got the Girl", "Fever" and "A Place in the Sun". Their second, from 1983, contains four songs; "Lazy Ways", "That Day" (otherwise unavailable by Marine Girls, although reworked by the Fox sisters for Grab Grab the Haddock), "Seascape" (otherwise unavailable by Marine Girls although it's a reworking of a song by Tracey Thorn from her début solo album A Distant Shore) and a cover version of "Love You More" by Buzzcocks.

From 1982, Thorn concentrated on her studies and her growing personal and professional relationship with fellow Hull student Ben Watt (who had contributed the photograph for the front cover of Lazy Ways). They formed their own musical project, Everything But The Girl, and their first single included a re-recording of the Marine Girls song, "On My Mind".

Marine Girls formally disbanded in 1983. Jane and Alice Fox joined up with guitarist Lester Noel and drummer Steven Galloway in Grab Grab the Haddock. and released two singles in 1984 and 1985 before splitting up. Tracey Thorn continued working with Everything But The Girl until the early 2000s. and then again from 2022.

Beach Party was named as one of Kurt Cobain's 50 favourite albums in his diaries. The two albums were reissued as a "two-fer" on CD by Cherry Red in 1997.

== Current activities ==
Alice Fox is Deputy Head of the School of Art at University of Brighton and works as a visual and performance artist with socially excluded groups.

Jane Fox is a visual artist and a Senior Lecturer at University of Brighton.

Gina Hartman continues to make music, including in the group Fenestration with Mark Flunder, formerly of TV Personalities.

Tracey Thorn is an author, columnist and recording artist.

== Discography ==
Release	Title	Format	UK Indie
December 1981	"On My Mind"/"The Lure of the Rockpools"	Single	—
1981	Beach Party	Album	29
February 1983	"Don't Come Back"/"You Must Be Mad"	Single	21
April 1983	Lazy Ways	Album	4

=== Various artists compilation albums ===
- Rupert Preaching at a Picnic (1981) – Marine Girls contributed an exclusive song called "Hate the Girl".
- Pillows & Prayers (1982) – included "Lazy Ways".
- Pillows & Prayers 2 (1984) – included "A Place in the Sun".
