= No Protection =

No Protection may refer to:

- No Protection (Starship album), a 1987 Starship album
- No Protection (Massive Attack album), a 1995 Massive Attack album remixed by Mad Professor
- No Protection (Justin Lo album), a 2006 Justin Lo album
