= It's All True =

It's All True may refer to:

- It's All True (film), a 1942 unfinished film project by Orson Welles
  - It's All True: Based on an Unfinished Film by Orson Welles, a 1993 documentary based on the film
- It's All True (J Xaverre album), 2002
- It's All True (Junior Boys album), 2011
- "It's All True" (song), a 2007 song by Tracey Thorn
- It's All True – International Documentary Film Festival, an annual film festival held in Brazil
- It's All True, a 2000 album by Bellatrix
