= No Protection (Massive Attack album) =

Remix album by Massive Attack and Mad Professor
- Released: 17 February 1995
- Recorded: 1994
- Genre: Trip hop; dub
- Length: 49:57

Massive Attack chronology
Protection (1994)	No Protection (1995)	Mezzanine (1998)

No Protection is a 1995 dub remix of Massive Attack's second album Protection by the British dub producer Mad Professor.

== Background ==
Mad Professor was contacted by Massive Attack after Protection was released to remix a song for a single. After the single was remixed, the band asked Mad Professor to listen to more of the album to explore the possibility of further remixes. The project then became a track by track remix of almost the entire album. Mad Professor heavily edited the original material to form a slow, pulsating mix in which the beat is emphasised, reverb is extensively used and the occasional vocals (many of the tracks are almost entirely instrumental) fade in-and-out in typical dub fashion.

== Critical reception ==
Professional ratings
Review scores
Source	Rating
AllMusic	4/5 stars
The Guardian	3/4 stars
Rolling Stone	4/5 stars
Select	4/5
The Village Voice	A−

According to music journalist Robert Christgau, No Protection was the most ballyhooed album during dub music's revival in the mid-1990s and In his review for The Village Voice, he found the music well defined and textured: "It also sustains a convincing gravity—a sense that all these whooshings and clangings and suckings and scrapings and boomings and snatches of tune relate to each other and the rest of the physical universe."

== Track listing ==
1. "Radiation Ruling the Nation" (based on "Protection") – 8:35
2. "Bumper Ball Dub" (based on "Karmacoma") – 5:59
3. "Trinity Dub" (based on "Three") – 4:22
4. "Cool Monsoon" (based on "Weather Storm") – 7:10
5. "Eternal Feedback" (based on "Sly") – 6:26
6. "Moving Dub" (based on "Better Things") – 5:57
7. "I Spy" (based on "Spying Glass") – 5:07
8. "Backward Sucking" (based on "Heat Miser") – 6:17
