= Café Bleu =

Studio album by the Style Council
- Released: March 16, 1984
- Recorded: October 1983 – January 1984
- Studios: Solid Bond (London); Strings recorded at: CBS (London)
- Genre: Sophisti-pop
- Length: 43.57
- Labels: Polydor; Geffen (US)
- Producers: Paul Weller; Peter Wilson

The Style Council chronology
Introducing The Style Council (1983)	Café Bleu (1984)	Our Favourite Shop (1985)

Singles from Café Bleu
- 1. "My Ever Changing Moods" Released: 1984; 2. "You're the Best Thing" Released: 1984

Café Bleu is the debut studio album by the English band the Style Council, released on 16 March 1984 through Polydor Records. It was produced by Paul Weller and Peter Wilson. The album followed four non-album singles released in the UK, the first three of which, along with their B-sides, were issued in North America, Australasia, Japan and parts of Europe as the compilation album Introducing The Style Council. Most of Café Bleu was recorded at Solid Bond Studios, owned by Weller, while the string arrangements were recorded at CBS.

Café Bleu featured numerous guest musicians, referred to as "Honorary Councillors", including Tracey Thorn and Ben Watt from Everything but the Girl. The album marked a significant departure from the sound of Weller's previous band, The Jam, embracing his interest in classic soul, jazz and rap. Although it received mixed reviews upon release, it became the band's most successful LP on the UK Albums Chart, where it spent 38 weeks. The singles "My Ever Changing Moods" and "You're the Best Thing" both reached the top 10 on the UK Singles Chart. The single version of "My Ever Changing Moods" is a different recording to the album version.

Café Bleu was retitled My Ever Changing Moods in the United States to capitalise on the success of the single of the same name, and featured a slightly different track listing.

== Critical reception ==
Professional ratings
Review scores
Source	Rating
AllMusic	4.5/5 stars
Number One	4/5
Q	4/5 stars
Record Collector	4/5 stars
Record Mirror	3/5 stars
The Rolling Stone Album Guide	2.5/5 stars
Smash Hits	8 1/2/10
Sounds	3.5/5 stars
Spin	3.5/5 stars
Uncut	7/10

Contemporary critics were divided. Sounds dismissed the record as "dispensable dross", while others were more favourable. In Smash Hits the album was given a 8 1/2 rating out of 10, Peter Martin writing: "Paul [Weller] clearly wants to win fans not on reputation but on musical worth. Me I never liked the Jam but this, c'est magnifique."

In a retrospective review, Stephen Thomas Erlewine of AllMusic found that Café Bleu, although being indicative of "the group's fatal flaw – a tendency to be too eclectic and overambitious", is nonetheless "one of their better efforts", praising Weller's "solid soul-tinged pop songs, including 'My Ever Changing Moods,' 'Headstart for Happiness,' 'You're the Best Thing,' and 'Here's One That Got Away.'"

Café Bleu was included in the book 1001 Albums You Must Hear Before You Die. Treble included it in a 2014 list of 10 essential sophisti-pop albums, saying that while it does not feature synthesisers like the other albums on the list, "a mix of blue-eyed soul, jazz, and modern influences (for the time at least) made this record a sophisticated, progressive piece of pop."

== Track listing ==
=== UK LP track listing ===
All tracks are written by Paul Weller, except where noted.

Side one
No.	Title	Writer(s)	Length
1.	"Mick's Blessings"	Mick Talbot	1:15
2.	"The Whole Point of No Return"		2:40
3.	"Me Ship Came In!"		3:06
4.	"Blue Café"		2:15
5.	"The Paris Match"		4:25
6.	"My Ever Changing Moods"		3:37
7.	"Dropping Bombs on the Whitehouse"	Weller; Talbot	3:15

Side two
No.	Title	Writer(s)	Length
8.	"A Gospel"		4:44
9.	"Strength of Your Nature"		4:20
10.	"You're the Best Thing"		5:40
11.	"Here's One That Got Away"		2:35
12.	"Headstart for Happiness"		3:20
13.	"Council Meetin'"	Weller; Talbot	2:29
Total length:			43:57

=== US LP track listing ===
The US LP, retitled My Ever Changing Moods, dropped two tracks ("Me Ship Came In!" and "Council Meetin'"), added one ("A Solid Bond in Your Heart"), and substituted an extended version of "My Ever Changing Moods" for the shorter UK LP version.

All tracks are written by Paul Weller, except where noted.

Side one
No.	Title	Writer(s)	Length
1.	"My Ever Changing Moods" (12" version)		5:42
2.	"The Whole Point of No Return"		2:42
3.	"Blue Café"		2:15
4.	"The Paris Match"		4:25
5.	"Dropping Bombs on the Whitehouse"	Weller; Talbot	3:15
6.	"A Solid Bond in Your Heart"		3:13

Side two
No.	Title	Writer(s)	Length
7.	"You're the Best Thing*"		5:45
8.	"A Gospel"		4:44
9.	"Strength of Your Nature"		4:20
10.	"You're the Best Thing"		5:40
11.	"Here's One That Got Away"		2:34
12.	"Headstart for Happiness"		3:19
13.	"Mick's Blessings"	Talbot	1:14
Total length:			49:08

*Certain releases of the My Ever Changing Moods album included the single version of "You're the Best Thing" (4:18) instead of the full-length album version (5:45) originally featured on Café Bleu. However, there is no indication of the different version anywhere on the album jacket (as the album sleeve for these editions of My Ever Changing Moods still lists a song length of 5:45, and the saxophone solo that adorns the single version is uncredited in the liner notes).

=== US cassette track listing ===
All tracks are written by Paul Weller, except where noted.

Side one
No.	Title	Writer(s)	Length
1.	"My Ever Changing Moods" (12" version)		5:42
2.	"The Whole Point of No Return"		2:42
3.	"Blue Café"		2:15
4.	"The Paris Match"		4:25
5.	"Dropping Bombs on the Whitehouse"	Weller; Talbot	3:15
6.	"A Solid Bond in Your Heart"		3:06
7.	"Me Ship Came In!"

Side two
No.	Title	Writer(s)	Length
8.	"You're the Best Thing"		5:45
9.	"A Gospel"		4:44
10.	"Strength of Your Nature"		4:20
11.	"Here's One That Got Away"		2:34
12.	"Headstart for Happiness"		3:19
13.	"Mick's Blessings"	Talbot	1:14
14.	"Council Meetin'"	Weller; Talbot	2:29
Total length:			49:08

== Personnel ==
=== The Style Council ===
- Paul Weller – vocals (2, 6, 9–12), guitar (2–4, 9–12), bass (3, 7, 13), synthesizer (9, 10), flute (13)
- Mick Talbot – piano (1, 3, 5, 7, 12), Hammond organ (9, 11, 13), synthesizer (9, 10, 12, 13), brass sound (12), clarinet (13)
- Steve White – drums, percussion

==== Additional musicians ====
- Billy Chapman – saxophone (3, 7, 10)
- Hilary Seabrook – saxophone (8, 12)
- Barbara Snow – trumpet (3, 7, 8, 12)
- Tracey Thorn – vocals (5)
- Dee C. Lee – vocals (9, 12)
- Ben Watt – guitar (5)
- Chris Bostock – double bass (5), bass (11)
- Peter Wilson – drum programming (8–10)
- Dizzi Heights – rap (8)
- Bobby Valentino – violin (11)

=== Technical ===
- Produced by Peter Wilson and Paul Weller
- Design – Simon Halfon and Paul Weller
- Photography – Peter Anderson

== Charts ==
=== Weekly charts ===
Chart (1984)	Peak position
Australian Albums (Kent Music Report)	27
Canada Top Albums/CDs (RPM)	43
Dutch Albums (Album Top 100)	16
Japanese Albums (Oricon)	23
New Zealand Albums (RMNZ)	6
Swedish Albums (Sverigetopplistan)	41
UK Albums (Official Charts)	2
US Billboard 200	56

=== Year-end charts ===
Chart (1984)	Position
New Zealand Albums (RMNZ)	29

== Certifications ==
Region	Certification	Certified units/sales
United Kingdom (BPI)	Gold	100,000^{^}
^{^} Shipments figures based on certification alone.
