= Fever Dream (Ben Watt album) =

Studio album by Ben Watt
- Released: 8 April 2016
- Recorded: London
- Length: 43:07
- Label: Unmade Road
- Producer: Ben Watt

Ben Watt chronology
Hendra (2014)	Fever Dream (2016)	Storm Damage (2020)

Professional ratings
Aggregate scores
Source	Rating
Metacritic	80/100
Review scores
Source	Rating
AllMusic	4/5 stars
Financial Times	3/5 stars
The Guardian	4/5 stars
Mojo	4/5 stars
The Music	4/5 stars
musicOMH	3/5 stars
Pitchfork	6.8/10
PopMatters	8/10
Q	3/5 stars
Uncut	9/10

Fever Dream is the third solo studio album by English singer, songwriter, author, and multi-instrumentalist Ben Watt. It was released on 8 April 2016 on Unmade Road. Self-produced at RAK Studios in London, it continues his relationship with guitarist Bernard Butler, begun on his award-winning 2014 album Hendra, and adds guest cameos from MC Taylor of North Carolina folk-rock band Hiss Golden Messenger, and Boston singer-songwriter Marissa Nadler. It received a 9/10 review in Uncut magazine. In a four-star review, the Guardian said: 'In his early 50s, he is making some of the best music of his career.'

== Track listing ==
All tracks are written by Ben Watt, except where noted.

Fever Dream track listing
No.	Title	Length
1.	"Gradually"	5:29
2.	"Fever Dream"	3:51
3.	"Between Two Fires"	3:20
4.	"Winter's Eve"	4:05
5.	"Women's Company"	5:09
6.	"Faces of My Friends"	4:50
7.	"Running with the Front Runners"	4:41
8.	"Never Goes Away"	2:52
9.	"Bricks and Wood"	4:22
10.	"New Year of Grace" (Benjamin Goldwasser, Andrew VanWyngarden, Ben Watt)	4:28

== Personnel ==
- Ben Watt – vocals, electric and acoustic guitars, piano, synthesizer
- Bernard Butler – electric guitar
- Martin Ditcham – drums, percussion
- Rex Horan – bass
- Marissa Nadler – backing vocals on "New Year of Grace"
- M.C. Taylor – backing vocals on "Fever Dream"

== Charts ==
Chart performance for Fever Dream
Chart (2016)	Peak position
UK Albums (OCC)	53
