= Lazy Ways =

Studio album by Marine Girls
- Released: April 1983
- Recorded: September 1982; Cold Storage, Brixton
- Genre: Indie pop
- Length: 31:10
- Label: Cherry Red Records
- Producer: Stuart Moxham

Marine Girls chronology
Beach Party (1981)	Lazy Ways (1983)

Singles from Lazy Ways
- 1. "Don't Come Back" Released: February 1983

Professional ratings
Review scores
Source	Rating
AllMusic	4/5 stars

Lazy Ways is the second album by the British indie pop group, Marine Girls. The album was released by Cherry Red Records in 1983. The song "Lazy Ways" appears on the Cherry Red showcase compilation Pillows & Prayers, while "A Place in the Sun" appears on Pillows and Prayers 2. The albums Lazy Ways and Beach Party were reissued together on one CD with bonus tracks by Cherry Red Records in 1988.

== Reception ==
The album reached #4 in the UK Indie Charts in April 1983. A single from the album "Don't Come Back" had reached #21 in February. AllMusic awarded the album with 4 stars and its review by Stewart Mason states: "The Marine Girls' second and final album - the group had already split by the time of its release, with Tracey Thorn pursuing a solo career before forming Everything But the Girl and the Fox sisters forming the even more minimalist Grab Grab the Haddock - is far more polished than their 1981 debut, at times almost approaching professionalism".

It was ranked at 42/50 among the "Albums of the Year" in 1983 by NME.

== Track listing ==
1. "A Place in the Sun" (Tracey Thorn) – 2:32
2. "Leave Me with the Boy" (Jane Fox) – 1:50
3. "Falling Again" (Fox) – 1:45
4. "Love to Know" (Thorn) – 2:51
5. "A Different Light" (Thorn) – 2:22
6. "Sunshine Blue" (Thorn) – 2:05
7. "Second Sight" (Thorn) – 2:57
8. "Don’t Come Back" (Thorn) – 2:01
9. "That Fink, Jazz-Me-Blues Boy" (Fox) – 1:33
10. "Fever" (Eddie Cooley, John Davenport) – 2:14
11. "Shell Island" (Fox) – 2:27
12. "Lazy Ways" (Fox) – 2:42
13. "Such a Thing" (Fox) – 2:21
14. "You Must Be Mad" (Fox) – 2:00

== Personnel ==
- Alice Fox – vocals and percussion
- Tracey Thorn – guitar and vocals
- Jane Fox – bass

Guest musicians

- Timothy Charles Hall – saxophone

== Charts ==
Chart (1983)	Peak position
UK Indie Chart	4
