= Beach Party (album) =

Studio album by Marine Girls
- Released: 1981
- Recorded: March – May 1981
- Genre: Indie pop
- Length: 29:14
- Label: In Phaze; Whaam! Records; Cherry Red Records
- Producer: Pat Bermingham

Marine Girls chronology
Beach Party (1981)	Lazy Ways (1983)

Professional ratings
Review scores
Source	Rating
AllMusic	3/5 stars

Beach Party is the debut album by the British indie pop group, Marine Girls. The album was recorded in a home studio by Pat Bermingham and released as a cassette on his own In Phaze label in 1981. It was released on vinyl by Whaam! Records in 1981 and then by Cherry Red Records in 1987 and 2014. The albums Beach Party and Lazy Ways were reissued together on one CD with bonus tracks by Cherry Red Records in 1988.

== Reception ==
The album reached #29 in the UK Indie Charts in March 1982. AllMusic awarded the album with 3 stars and its review by Stewart Mason states: "The debut album by the Marine Girls is one of the most willfully amateurish releases of its era, which is not necessarily a bad thing".

Beach Party was named as one of Kurt Cobain's 50 favourite albums in his diaries.

== Track listing ==
1. "In Love" (Tracey Thorn) – 1:53
2. "Fridays" (Thorn) – 2:03
3. "Tonight?" (Thorn) – 1:19
4. "Times We Used to Spend" (Jane Fox) – 1:44
5. "Flying Over Russia" (Thorn) – 2:05
6. "Tutti Lo Sanno" (Thorn) – 2:21
7. "All Dressed Up" (Thorn) – 1:46
8. "Honey" (Thorn) – 2:02
9. "Holiday Song" (Fox, Thorn) – 2:12
10. "He Got the Girl" (Thorn) – 1:24
11. "Day/Night Dreams" (Fox) – 1:10
12. "Promises" (Thorn) – 1:29
13. "Silent Red" (Fox) – 1:33
14. "Dishonesty" (Thorn) – 2:16
15. "20,000 Leagues" (Fox) – 2:23
16. "Marine Girls" (Thorn) – 1:39

== Personnel ==
- Alice Fox – vocals and percussion
- Gina Hartman – vocals and percussion
- Tracey Thorn – guitar and vocals
- Jane Fox – bass

== Charts ==
Chart (1981)	Peak position
UK Indie Chart	29
