= Sasse (musician) =

Finnish musician

Sasse is the stage name used by Finnish electronic music producer and engineer Klas Henrik Lindblad. Based out of Berlin, Germany since 1999, Lindblad runs the Blackhead Studios mixing and mastering studio, and has also recorded under the monikers Freestyle Man, Cocamoto Exclusivo, Morris Brown, Sassomatic, Thirsty Monk, and Winston Fletcher. He was also a member of the electronic act Mr. Negative. Sasse's base genre falls into the Deep House and IDM category but also incorporates the styles of house music, electro, techno, Giorgio Moroder-influenced disco and Italo disco.

After several singles released as a remixer (many on his own Moodmusic record label), Sasse released his debut full-length album Made Within the Upper Stairs of Heaven in May 2006. He has also contributed writing and production work to Tracey Thorn's 2007 album Out of the Woods.

In a recent interview, Sasse explained that his music production style became much more raw over the years after he had spent many long nights cleaning his tracks until they lost some of their 'raw' character.

== Discography ==
=== Albums ===
- 2006 Made Within the Upper Stairs of Heaven
- 2008 Toinen
- 2012 Third Encounter
- 2022 Mitte Housing Authority
- 2025 Weekends Album
