= Protection (Massive Attack album) =

Studio album by Massive Attack
- Released: 26 September 1994
- Recorded: 1993–1994
- Studios: Wild Bunch (London); Massive Attack (Bristol); Antenna (Bristol)
- Genre: Trip hop
- Length: 48:57
- Labels: Wild Bunch; Circa
- Producers: Nellee Hooper; Massive Attack

Massive Attack chronology
Blue Lines (1991)	Protection (1994)	No Protection (1995)

Singles from Protection
- 1. "Sly" Released: 17 October 1994; 2. "Protection" Released: 9 January 1995; 3. "Karmacoma" Released: 20 March 1995

Protection is the second studio album by English electronic music group Massive Attack, released on 26 September 1994 by Wild Bunch Records and Circa. DJ Mad Professor remixed the album in 1995 under the name No Protection.

== Composition ==
Like most of Massive Attack's albums, the music often defies categorisation, ranging from R&B (title track and "Sly") to hip hop/rap ("Karmacoma" and "Eurochild") to reggae-tinged synth-pop ("Spying Glass") to classical-influenced electronica instrumentals ("Weather Storm" and "Heat Miser"). The album follows Blue Lines structurally, to the point that the font used on the cover of the album is the same, Helvetica Heavy Italic. The album cover also nods to Blue Lines, revealing a futuristic, impenetrable wall behind a mostly-burned version of this previous album's artwork—implying that the depicted "flammable gas" had been ignited.

Tricky again appeared on the album, rapping on the tracks "Karmacoma" (whose video was directed by Jonathan Glazer, and which featured a sample from The KLF's "Dream Time in Lake Jackson" at the 2:00-minute mark) and "Eurochild" (which featured samples from Startled Insects' "Cheetah" and Liquid Liquid's "Lock Groove (In)").

== Reception ==
Professional ratings
Review scores
Source	Rating
AllMusic	4/5 stars
Christgau's Consumer Guide	A−
Encyclopedia of Popular Music	3/5 stars
The Guardian	4/4 stars
Knoxville News Sentinel	3.5/5 stars
NME	8/10
Rolling Stone	4/5 stars
The Rolling Stone Album Guide	3.5/5 stars
Select	5/5
Tom Hull – on the Web	A−
Vox	8/10

Paul Evans of Rolling Stone wrote, "Cool, sexy stuff, it smoothly fuses dub, club and soul, grounding its grace in sampled hip-hop beats."

In 2011, Rolling Stone ranked Protection at number 51 on its list of the "100 Best Albums of the Nineties". The album is also listed in the book 1001 Albums You Must Hear Before You Die.

As of February 2010, the album had sold 292,000 copies in the United States, according to Nielsen SoundScan.

== Track listing ==
No.	Title	Writer(s)	Length
1.	"Protection"	Andrew Vowles; Robert Del Naja; Grantley Marshall; Tracey Thorn	7:51
2.	"Karmacoma"	Vowles; Del Naja; Marshall; Tricky; Tim Norfolk; Bob Locke	5:16
3.	"Three"	Vowles; Del Naja; Marshall; Nellee Hooper; Nicolette Suwoton	3:49
4.	"Weather Storm"	Vowles; Del Naja; Marshall; Hooper; Craig Armstrong; Curtis Harmon; Cedric Napoleon; James Lloyd; Cameron Murray	4:59
5.	"Spying Glass"	Vowles; Del Naja; Marshall; Hooper; Horace Andy	5:20
6.	"Better Things"	Vowles; Del Naja; Marshall; Thorn; Ben Watt; James Brown	4:13
7.	"Eurochild"	Vowles; Del Naja; Marshall; Tricky; Norfolk; Locke	5:11
8.	"Sly"	Vowles; Del Naja; Marshall; Hooper; Suwoton; Vivien Goldman	5:24
9.	"Heat Miser"	Vowles; Del Naja; Marshall; Hooper; Marius de Vries	3:39
10.	"Light My Fire" (live)	The Doors	3:15
Total length:			48:57

=== Sample credits ===
- "Weather Storm" contains samples from "It's Time for Love" by Pieces of a Dream.
- "Better Things" contains samples from "Never Can Say Goodbye" by James Brown.
- "Light My Fire" (live) contains samples from "Light My Fire" by Young-Holt Unlimited.

== Personnel ==
=== Musicians ===
- Massive Attack, Marius de Vries, Andy Wright, The Insects, Nick Warren – programming
- Tracey Thorn – vocals (tracks 1, 6)
- 3D – vocals (tracks 2, 7)
- Tricky – vocals (tracks 2, 7)
- Nicolette – vocals (tracks 3, 8)
- Craig Armstrong – piano (tracks 4, 9); arrangement, conducting (track 8)
- Horace Andy – vocals (tracks 5, 10)
- Chester Kamen – guitar (track 6)
- Rob Merril – drums (track 9)
- Daddy G – vocals (track 10)

=== Technical ===
- Nellee Hooper – production, mixing (all tracks); mix engineering (track 10)
- Massive Attack – production, mixing
- Mark "Spike" Stent – mix engineering (tracks 1–8)
- Jim Abbiss – mix engineering (track 9)
- Jeremy "Jim Bob" Wheatley – additional engineering
- Al Stone – additional engineering
- Mike Marsh – mastering

=== Artwork ===
- Massive Attack, Michael-Nash Assoc. – artwork
- Matthew Donaldson, Jean-Baptiste Mondino, Eddie Monsoon – photography

== Charts ==
1994–2001 chart performance for Protection
Chart (1994–2001)	Peak position
Australian Albums (ARIA)	15
Austrian Albums (Ö3 Austria)	21
Belgian Albums (Ultratop Wallonia)	47
Belgian Alternative Albums (Ultratop Flanders)	46
Canada Top Albums/CDs (RPM)	49
Dutch Albums (Album Top 100)	76
European Albums (Music & Media)	21
Finnish Albums (Suomen virallinen lista)	33
French Albums (SNEP)	24
German Albums (Offizielle Top 100)	63
New Zealand Albums (RMNZ)	9
Norwegian Albums (VG-lista)	37
Scottish Albums (Official Charts)	12
Swedish Albums (Sverigetopplistan)	14
Swiss Albums (Schweizer Hitparade)	29
UK Albums (Official Charts)	4
UK Dance Albums (OCC)	1
UK R&B Albums (Official Charts)	1
US Heatseekers Albums (Billboard)	19

2019 weekly chart performance for Protection
Chart (2019)	Peak position
Greek Albums (IFPI)	8

2020 chart performance for Protection
Chart (2020)	Peak position
Polish Albums (ZPAV)	44

== Certifications ==
Certifications for Protection
Region	Certification	Certified units/sales
France (SNEP)	Gold	100,000^{*}
Netherlands (NVPI)	Gold	50,000^{^}
New Zealand (RMNZ)	Gold	7,500^{^}
Switzerland (IFPI Switzerland)	Gold	25,000^{^}
United Kingdom (BPI)	2× Platinum	653,864
Summaries
Europe (IFPI)	Platinum	1,000,000^{*}
^{*} Sales figures based on certification alone.^{^} Shipments figures based on certification alone.
