= Out of the Woods (Tracey Thorn album) =

2007 album by Tracey Thorn

Studio album by Tracey Thorn
- Released: 5 March 2007
- Genres: Pop; dance; electronica
- Length: 42:54
- Label: Virgin
- Producers: Tracey Thorn; Ewan Pearson; Cagedbaby; Charles Webster; Martin Wheeler; Alex Santos

Tracey Thorn chronology
| A Distant Shore (1982) | Out of the Woods (2007) | Love and Its Opposite (2010) |

Out of the Woods is the second solo album by Tracey Thorn. It was released on 5 March 2007 on Virgin Records. The album charted on the Billboard 200, peaking at number 172 on 7 April 2007.

The majority of the album's production was by Ewan Pearson who also produced the first single, "It's All True". Other collaborators included Cagedbaby, Charles Webster, Klas Lindblad, Martin Wheeler and Alex Santos.

== Background ==
Out of the Woods marked Thorn's return to the music scene as a solo artist after nearly eight years. It was released on 20 March 2007 in the U.S. on Astralwerks.

Thorn told Billboard magazine about the recording of the album:

"When I started this album, I was thinking, 'Well, alright, I want to make a quirky little record, a little bit acoustic, a little bit dance... I also thought I was going to do a lot of covers, because I hadn't written anything in a long time. But once I started, I found myself writing more songs and collaborating with people. When the record was finished, I was quite startled. I thought, 'Wow, I made a pop record without really meaning to.'"

Thorn namechecked post-punk peers and idols Terry Hall (from 2-Tone Records ska-revivalists The Specials, and New Pop trio Fun Boy Three), Edwyn Collins (of Postcard Records' Orange Juice) and Siouxsie Sioux in the song "Hands Up to the Ceiling". The record also includes contributions from Cagedbaby, Ewan Pearson, Charles Webster, Sasse, Darshan Jesrani, Martin Wheeler and Alex Santos.

== Critical reception ==
Professional ratings
Aggregate scores
| Source | Rating |
|---|---|
| Metacritic | 76/100 |
Review scores
| Source | Rating |
| AllMusic | 4/5 stars |
| Alternative Press | 4/5 stars |
| Entertainment Weekly | B |
| The Guardian | 4/5 stars |
| Mojo | 4/5 stars |
| musicOMH | 3/5 stars |
| The Observer | 4/5 stars |
| Pitchfork | 5.6/10 |
| Spin | 8/10 |
| Uncut | 8/10 |

At Metacritic, which assigns a weighted average score out of 100 to reviews from mainstream critics, the album received an average score of 76, based on 20 reviews, indicating "generally favorable reviews".

== Singles ==
The first single from the album, "It's All True", accompanied by remixes from the likes of Kris Menace & Martin Buttrich, was released on 7 February and the second single, "Raise the Roof" was released on 18 June. The third single, "Grand Canyon" was released on 30 October. A fourth single, "King's Cross" (which is a cover version of a Pet Shop Boys song) was released on 12 December.

== Track listing ==
| No. | Title | Writer(s) | Length |
|---|---|---|---|
| 1. | "Here It Comes Again" | Thorn | 3:06 |
| 2. | "A-Z" | Thorn, Gandey | 3:41 |
| 3. | "It's All True" | Thorn, Jesrani, Lindblad, Pearson | 4:13 |
| 4. | "Get Around to It" | Russell | 6:00 |
| 5. | "Hands Up to the Ceiling" | Thorn | 2:58 |
| 6. | "Easy" | Thorn, Wheeler | 3:58 |
| 7. | "Falling off a Log" | Thorn | 3:17 |
| 8. | "Nowhere Near" | Thorn | 3:07 |
| 9. | "Grand Canyon" | Thorn, Santos | 6:07 |
| 10. | "By Piccadilly Station I Sat Down and Wept" | Thorn | 2:25 |
| 11. | "Raise the Roof" | Thorn, Gandey | 4:02 |

iTunes edition bonus track
| No. | Title | Writer(s) | Length |
|---|---|---|---|
| 12. | "King's Cross" | Tennant, Lowe | 4:28 |

== Charts ==
Chart performance for Out of the Woods
| Chart (2007) | Peak position |
|---|---|
| Australian Albums (ARIA) | 86 |
| Italian Albums (FIMI) | 79 |
| Swedish Albums (Sverigetopplistan) | 44 |
| UK Albums (Official Charts) | 38 |
| US Billboard 200 | 172 |
| US Top Dance Albums (Billboard) | 4 |
| US Heatseekers Albums (Billboard) | 5 |
| US Independent Albums (Billboard) | 20 |
