= Patient (memoir) =

Memoir by musician Ben Watt

Patient: The True Story of a Rare Illness
- Author: Ben Watt
- Genre: Memoir
- Publisher: Penguin Books
- Publication date: May 1, 1997
- ISBN: 0-8021-3583-8

Patient: The True Story of a Rare Illness is the name of a 192-page memoir by musician Ben Watt. It was published on May 1, 1997, by Penguin Books (ISBN 0-8021-3583-8). The book dealt largely with Watt's experience with a rare disease, eosinophilic granulomatosis with polyangiitis, and his recovery.

The book was listed as a New York Times Notable Book of the Year, a Sunday Times Book Of The Year chosen by William Boyd, and Village Voice Literary Supplement Favorite Book of the Year, and was also a finalist for the Esquire-Waterstones Best Non-Fiction Award in the UK.
