= Bedsit Disco Queen =

- Author: Tracey Thorn
- Language: English
- Genre: Autobiography, music
- Publisher: Hachette Digital, Little, Brown Book Group
- Publication date: February 2013
- Publication place: United Kingdom
- Media type: Print (paperback) and e-book
- Pages: 384 pp (first edition)
- ISBN: 978-1-40551-398-2
- Followed by: Naked at the Albert Hall

Bedsit Disco Queen: How I grew up and tried to be a pop star is an autobiography written by Tracey Thorn, first published in February 2013. The book received widespread critical acclaim and was a Sunday Times Top Ten bestseller. The book was featured on BBC Radio 4's Book of the Week in March 2013.

== Reception ==
Writing for The Independent, Fiona Sturges stated that “Thorn is about as far removed from typical notions of a successful singer as it's possible to get. Which makes her ideal to report on the pop star experience, and the ever-shifting landscape of the British music scene of the Eighties and Nineties".

In The Times, Lucy Denyer stated that "It is a beautifully written book, dryly funny and searingly honest about growing up, whether it was discovering feminism, or being slightly out of her depth as a 15-year-old at an Anti-Nazi League rally".
