= North Marine Drive =

Studio album by Ben Watt
- Released: February 1983
- Recorded: 16–20 September 1982
- Studio: Alvic Studios, West Kensington, London
- Genre: Folk rock, indie folk
- Length: 33:00
- Label: Cherry Red
- Producer: Ben Watt with Mike Gregovich

Ben Watt chronology
North Marine Drive (1983)	Hendra (2014)

Professional ratings
Review scores
Source	Rating
AllMusic	4/5 stars

North Marine Drive is the debut album of Ben Watt. The album was released on Cherry Red in 1983, prior to Watt's success in Everything but the Girl, and reached number one in the UK Indie Chart the same year. The tone of the album is reflective and melancholic, reminiscent of some of the more stripped-down work of Everything but the Girl. Its sparse, mainly acoustic, instrumentation effectively highlights Watt's songwriting and vocal qualities. Jazz saxophonist Peter King, who went on to collaborate with Everything but the Girl, contributes alto saxophone to several tracks.

The title of the album is similar to the location in Scarborough, England which is photographed on the album's cover and is called Marine Drive. There is a "North Marine Drive" in the nearby resort of Bridlington which Ben Watt felt was a better title for the album.

CD issues also feature five bonus tracks of Watt's collaboration with Robert Wyatt, originally released as an EP in March 1982 (Summer Into Winter). A downloadable version available from Cherry Red added a further three tracks, originally released on a 1981 single, and later reissued on the compilation album Our Brilliant Careers: Cherry Red Rarities 1981-1983.

The song "Some Things Don't Matter" first appeared on the Cherry Red showcase compilation Pillows & Prayers in 1982. "Walter and John", from "Summer Into Winter", also appeared on the second volume of Pillows and Prayers.

== Track listing ==
All tracks composed by Ben Watt; except where indicated

1. "On Box Hill" (2:27)
2. "Some Things Don't Matter" (4:27)
3. "Lucky One" (2:33)
4. "Empty Bottles" (4:38)
5. "North Marine Drive" (2:18)
6. "Waiting Like Mad" (4:52)
7. "Thirst For Knowledge" (3:30)
8. "Long Time No Sea" (5:24)
9. "You're Gonna Make Me Lonesome When You Go" (Bob Dylan) (3:48)

=== CD reissue bonus tracks (Summer Into Winter, with Robert Wyatt) ===
10. "Walter and John" (4:07)
11. "Aquamarine" (4:12)
12. "Slipping Slowly" (2:53)
13. "Another Conversation With Myself" (1:24)
14. "A Girl in Winter" (3:50)

=== Digital download bonus tracks ===
15. "Can't"
16. "Tower of Silence"
17. "Aubade"

== Personnel ==
- Ben Watt – semi-acoustic and acoustic guitars, piano, vocals
- Peter King – alto saxophone

Technical

- Robert Cheesmond – cover photography

=== Summer Into Winter ===
- Ben Watt – vocals, guitar
- Robert Wyatt – piano, vocals
