= Protection (Massive Attack song) =

1995 single by Massive Attack

Single by Massive Attack with Tracey Thorn

from the album Protection
- B-side: "Three" (remix)
- Released: 9 January 1995
- Genre: Trip hop; R&B
- Length: 7:51 (album version); 4:53 (single edit)
- Label: Wild Bunch; Circa
- Songwriters: Andrew Vowles; Robert Del Naja; Grant Marshall; Tracey Thorn
- Producers: Massive Attack; Nellee Hooper

Massive Attack singles chronology
"Sly" (1994)	"Protection" (1995)	"Karmacoma" (1995)

Music video
- "Protection" on YouTube

"Protection" is a collaboration between English trip hop collective Massive Attack and Tracey Thorn from English duo Everything but the Girl. The song appears on Massive Attack's second studio album, Protection (1994). Released as a single on 9 January 1995 by the labels Wild Bunch and Circa, "Protection" reached number 14 on the UK Singles Chart, staying on the chart for four weeks, and also peaked at number 27 in New Zealand. The song received critical acclaim from music critics, who praised Thorn's vocal performance. Michel Gondry directed the accompanying music video. The song was also included on Everything but the Girl's compilation The Best of and Like the Deserts Miss the Rain.

The song contains samples taken from "The Payback" by James Brown, namely the hi-hat/bass figure that drives the beat and the recurrent wah-wah guitar chord.

== Composition ==
Massive Attack had been looking to move away from the "Motown reggae" of their first album. Thorn received a backing track on cassette in the latter half of 1993—without title, melody or lyrics or "any indication as to where those things might go". Taken aback by the comparatively "slow and empty" sound, Thorn recognised that "a whole new thing" was happening.

Initially unsure where to begin, Thorn lived with the track, allowing it to "seep into [her] brain", before putting down the words in a single sitting. She recounted the story of a girl told by friends a few nights earlier and reflected on her protective feelings towards Everything but the Girl band mate Ben Watt following a serious illness.

== Critical reception ==
Larry Flick from Billboard magazine praised the song as "gorgeous". Linda Ryan from the Gavin Report wrote, "Produced by Soul II Soul's Nellee Hooper (who also did Björk's album, Debut), 'Protection' is a slow groove to paradise. I mean, this one is smooooth! Everything but the Girl's Tracey Thorn handles the vocals on this one, and she really shines." Caroline Sullivan from The Guardian felt the "normally limpid" singer "shows torchy sensuality" on the song. Chuck Campbell from Knoxville News Sentinel viewed it as "supple", naming it the album's "highlight". In his weekly UK chart commentary, James Masterton complimented the "velvet tones" of Thorn, stating that "the result is an instant Top 20 smash, just one place short of the peak originally reached by their groundbreaking debut hit 'Unfinished Sympathy'." David Stubbs from Melody Maker felt "Protection" "sets the tone that they sustain throughout this eclectic selection, with its stately, undulating sequencers and its wits-end plea for compassion and assistance. And though you want to live yourself/Could you forgive yourself/If you left her as you found her...." James Hamilton from Music Week's RM Dance Update described the song as "an attractive gentle atmospheric R&B swayer".

James Lavelle for NME wrote, "You have to forget the boom-box busting beats of the past and enter a more dreamy, minimalist state, complete with analogue synth, piano lead and a constant, slamming beat. A welcome and brave return.!" Another NME editor, Ted Kessler, praised "her rich voice", while Andy Richardson named it 'Definitely Nearly Single of the Week', writing, "There's a storm brewing. Rain, a bit of thunder and all that stuff. Tracey Thorn breaks in and the sun starts shining. Mr Eno takes over, sprinkles angel dust and the skies clear. We pack our bags, remove some of our clothes and meander to a green-grassed place where we swoon and commune all day. Honest, 'Protection' is music to move you, music to soothe you; a enchanting dive into tranguil waters. It's pure, unadulterated dance; blissed, heavenly feel-good stuff that will make you smile at people in the street." Parry Gettelman from Orlando Sentinel felt the singer is "a cool, elegantly melancholy presence". Matt Hall from Select wrote, "From the moment Tracey Thorn's voice — an inspired recruitment — floats in over the stripped-down beat and patented Wild Bunch time-lapse scratches [...], it's apparent that Massive's ability to do funny things to the nerves on your scalp is undiminished." Barry Walters for Spin stated, "The eight pained minutes of the title track are alone worth the price of the CD, despite suggesting that an Everything but the Girl remix album might have been the way to go."

== Music video ==
A music video was produced to promote the single, directed by French film director, screenwriter, and producer Michel Gondry. It was made as a one-take, seven-minute-long video, whose camera travels inside and outside an apartment building observing its tenants. The video both opens and ends on the street outside the building. It received an award from MTV in the category of Video of the Year at the 1995 MTV Europe Music Awards.

Robert Del Naja told The Guardian in 2010, "The 'Protection' video shoot was the most agonising by far. We were lucky to work with Michel Gondry but I can safely say it was the start of all my back problems in life. I had to hold myself for around 15 takes against a slanting wall, in freezing Paris weather. We couldn't get our heads around it until he bought this scaled-down Lego model to the pub … or was it the record company? Either way I had a drink in my hand. But you couldn't storyboard it; without the model you couldn't understand how it would work. He was a very subtle guy, not a big booming director, and had such a strong imagination you had to trust him completely. I'd love to say that idea came all from us, but as a band I guess we take comfort in the fact that he was inspired by the song we gave him."

== Track listings ==
- UK CD1 and cassette single; Australian CD single
1. "Protection" (7-inch edit)
2. "Protection" (the Eno mix)
3. "Protection" (Radiation for the Nation mix)
4. "Protection" (J Sw!ft mix)
- UK CD2
1. "Protection" (album version)
2. "Protection" (Underdog's Angel Dust mix)
3. "Three" (Dom T's House of Fortune mix)
- UK 12-inch single

A1. "Protection" (Underdog's Angel Dust mix)
A2. "Protection" (Radiation for the Nation mix)
B1. "Protection" (the Eno mix)
B2. "Protection" (J Sw!ft mix)
B3. "Protection" (album version)

- European CD single
1. "Protection" (7-inch edit)
2. "Protection" (the Eno mix)
- US CD single
1. "Protection" (LP version) – 7:51
2. "Protection" (single edit) – 4:53
3. "Protection" (the Eno mix) – 9:10
4. "Protection" (J Sw!ft mix) – 7:12
5. "Three" (Dom T's House of Fortune mix) – 7:16
- US cassette single

A1. "Protection" (single edit) – 4:53
A2. "Protection" (the Eno mix) – 9:10
B1. "Three" (Dom T's House of Fortune mix) – 7:16
B2. "Protection" (J Sw!ft mix) – 7:12

== Charts ==
Chart (1995)	Peak position
Australia (ARIA)	91
Europe (Eurochart Hot 100)	52
Europe (European Dance Radio)	7
Israel (Israeli Singles Chart)	30
Netherlands (Single Top 100 Tipparade)	7
New Zealand (Recorded Music NZ)	27
Scottish Singles Sales (Official Charts)	18
UK Singles (Official Charts)	14
UK Hip Hop/R&B (Official Charts)	2

== Release history ==
Region	Date	Format(s)	Label(s)	Ref.
United Kingdom	9 January 1995	12-inch vinyl; CD1; cassette	Wild Bunch; Circa	
United Kingdom	16 January 1995	CD2	Wild Bunch; Circa	
Australia	30 January 1995	CD	Wild Bunch; Circa	
