= Plain Sailing (song) =

Single by Tracey Thorn

from the album A Distant Shore
- Released: October 1982 (UK)
- Recorded: 1982
- Label: Cherry Red
- Songwriter(s): Tracey Thorn

Tracey Thorn singles chronology
"Plain Sailing" (1982)	"It's All True" (2007)

"Plain Sailing" is the debut solo single by English singer-songwriter Tracey Thorn.

== Overview ==
The original version appeared on Thorn's first solo album A Distant Shore in 1982. It was re-recorded and released as Thorn's first single on 7" vinyl later that year. The B-side "Goodbye Joe" is a cover version of a song by fellow Cherry Red Records recording artists Monochrome Set.

The re-recorded version of "Plain Sailing" was included on the Cherry Red Pillows & Prayers compilation album.

The single sleeve featured the Robert Doisneau photograph Le baiser de l'hôtel de ville (Kiss by the Hôtel de Ville) and hand-lettering by Thorn herself.

Thorn did not release another solo single until "It's All True" 25 years later.

In June 2010, Thorn performed "Plain Sailing" live for the first time in nearly 30 years, during an appearance on the NPR programme World Cafe.

== Critical reception ==
In May 1984, George Michael stated that "Plain Sailing" was his favourite Tracey Thorn track during a review of the Eden album on the BBC2 programme, 8 Days a Week.

== Track listing ==
=== 7 inch single ===
1. "Plain Sailing"
2. "Goodbye Joe"
