= Karmacoma =

1995 single by Massive Attack

Single by Massive Attack

from the album Protection
- Released: 20 March 1995
- Genre: Trip hop; dub
- Length: 5:21
- Label: Virgin
- Songwriters: Andrew Vowles; Robert Del Naja; Grant Marshall; Adrian Thaws; Tim Norfolk; Bob Locke
- Producers: Massive Attack; Nellee Hooper

Massive Attack singles chronology
"Protection" (1995)	"Karmacoma" (1995)	"Risingson" (1997)

"Karmacoma" is a song by British trip hop collective Massive Attack, released as the third and final single from their second album, Protection, on 20 March 1995. It contains rap vocals from band members 3D and Tricky. Tricky also recorded his own version of "Karmacoma", renamed "Overcome" for his debut studio album, Maxinquaye.

Massive Attack themselves recorded a second version of the song (without Tricky) renamed "Fake the Aroma" on The Help Album, a compilation album for the charity War Child. The music video for "Karmacoma" was directed by Jonathan Glazer, his first.

== Samples ==
The main rhythmic structure of the track is a loop taken from Aaja Sajan Aaja by Alka Yagnik. The melodic refrain (at 0:54) is taken from Russian composer Alexander Borodin's opera Prince Igor, and also includes a sample of Tuvan throat singing also used by The KLF in "Dream Time in Lake Jackson", both of which come from the documentary 'Herders of Mongun Taiga'. The bass line sample featured on the Portishead remix is the same bass line used by Serge Gainsbourg in the song "Melody" from his 1971 album Histoire de Melody Nelson. The "Napoli Trip Mix" of the song by Italian band Almamegretta contains samples from Roberto Paci Dalò's record "Napoli", released in 1993. The Startled Insects wrote the music for this track (Tim Norfolk and Bob Locke).

== "Overcome" ==
"Overcome"

Single by Tricky

from the album Maxinquaye
- Released: 16 January 1995
- Genre: Trip hop
- Length: 4:30
- Label: 4th & B'way
- Songwriter: Tricky
- Producers: Tricky; Mark Saunders

Tricky singles chronology
"Ponderosa" (1994)	"Overcome" (1995)	"Black Steel" (1995)

Tricky remade "Karmacoma" for his 1995 debut album Maxinquaye under the title "Overcome", enlisting Martina Topley-Bird to sing his lyrics and incorporating a sample of Shakespears Sister's 1992 song "Moonchild". It was released as the third single from the album, a month before the album release. David Bennun from The Quietus later called his version "a thick, unquiet fever dream – and an almost cubist vision of a moment in time that encompasses within the same frame a couple walking through quiet suburbs as the Gulf War rages three thousand miles away". In an interview for Melody Maker, Tricky was asked about the sexual nature of the song and other material on Maxinquaye, to which he responded:

No, no, not at all. Even the parts that are about sex ain't about sex. Like in Overcome: ‘You and I walking through the suburbs / We're not exactly lovers’. Then it goes, ‘And then you wait / For the next Kuwait’. You could be walking down the street with your girlfriend, and at the same moment Kuwait is getting bombed. It's to do with a moment in time. I'm trying to be three dimensional. It's about the world. I suppose there is a lot of sex and violence in the world. We're like – Martina, what's that word – sociologists? Is that a word? We're documentarians. That's what we do. We document the situations around us. Violence. Death. Sex. Money. Deviousness.

According to AllMusic critic Amy Hanson, the intensely "breathless and claustrophobic" song is still one of trip hop's best works: "Featuring Martina Topley-Bird's clear, otherworldly vocals, the song is constructed around a thrumming slow, low heartbeat bass beat and looped catch of breath that becomes earnest yearning – an act of foreplay which frames the lyrics, 'don't want to be on top of your list, and never been properly kissed.'" The song was featured on the soundtrack to the 1995 film Strange Days.

== Track listing ==
=== "Karmacoma" ===
1. "Karmacoma" – 5:21
2. "Karmacoma" (Bumper Ball Dub) – 6:01
3. "Karmacoma" (The Napoli Trip Mix) – 6:10
4. "Karmacoma" (Portishead Experience Mix) – 4:03
5. "Karmacoma" (Ventom Dub Special) – 6:08
6. "Karmacoma" (UNKLE Situation Mix) – 5:42

=== "Performers in Karmacoma Video" ===
1. Olegar Fedoro
2. Tricky (rapper)
3. Robert Del Naja
4. Daddy G
5. Andrew Vowles

=== "Overcome" ===
1. "Overcome" (Album Mix) – 3:45 / 4:30
2. "Overcome" (Bungle Mix) – 2:39
3. "Abbaon Fat Tracks" – 5:53
4. "Overcome" (Zippy Mix) – 2:39

Even though the first track is listed as "Album Mix", it is 45 seconds shorter (on the CD single) than the version on the album Maxinquaye. Conversely, the third track is an extended version compared to the version on Maxinquaye.
