= The Unbending Trees =

The Unbending Trees are a musical project that hail from Budapest, Hungary. They specialize in sparse chamber ballads and slo-core pop.

== History ==
Kristóf Hajós-Dévényi (vocals, words) was involved in various musical projects before founding The Unbending Trees in 2006, and was a friar candidate in his teens at the Franciscans, spending several years dependent on antidepressants. Balázs Havasi (piano) is a Hungarian pianist and graduated at the Hungarian Music Academy. The group started when Hajós created a MySpace page for songs he had written using pieces by classical pianist Havasi. He then added some tracks by Háry to the site, and for a time the trio existed without the members ever having actually met. The Unbending Trees were discovered by Ben Watt via MySpace and subsequently signed to Watt's new Strange Feeling Records. The Unbending Trees released their debut EP in September in the United Kingdom, which was later on licensed to their home country, Hungary by mTon/Magneoton. The band's debut album, Chemically Happy (is the New Sad) was released in 2008 and features contributions from Watt and his partner Tracey Thorn. Their increased exposure in the UK has led to the band receiving extensive radio airplay in Hungary and reaching MTV Hungary's Top 10, as well as being nominated as the best Hungarian act of 2008 at the MTV European Music Awards. The band started working with the UK based Sincere Management in early 2009 owned by Peter Jenner. Péter Háry (bass, programming) quit the band in the spring of 2009 and has been replaced by Ferenc Honyecz.

The band have drawn several comparisons with Leonard Cohen, and often been considered as the new high brow of music.

In 2010, Tracey Thorn covered the band's first hit, 'You Are A Lover' on her solo album, 'Love and Its Opposite'.

In 2013 the two founding members of the band recorded a double album titled 'Meteor', to be released 15 October that year.

== Discography ==
=== Albums ===
- Chemically Happy (Is The New Sad) Released 6 October 2008
- Meteor Released 15 October 2013

=== EPs ===
- The First Day EP Released September 2007 in UK / December 2007 in Hungary
- Everybody's Lover EP Released 8 December 2008

=== Singles ===
- "The Original" (Szucs Krisztian ([Heaven Street Seven]) vs The Unbending Trees) Released April 2008
- "Overture" (with Tracey Thorn ) Released 29 September 2008
