= A Distant Shore (album) =

Studio album by Tracey Thorn
- Released: 1982
- Genre: Acoustic
- Length: 23:00
- Label: Cherry Red

Tracey Thorn chronology
A Distant Shore (1982)	Out of the Woods (2007)

Singles from A Distant Shore
- 1. "Plain Sailing / Goodbye Joe" Released: 1982

Professional ratings
Review scores
Source	Rating
AllMusic	4.5/5 stars
Smash Hits	6/10

A Distant Shore is the first studio album by Tracey Thorn, released via Cherry Red Records in 1982. It includes a cover version of The Velvet Underground's "Femme Fatale".

Recorded for just £138, the album reached number 1 in the UK Indie Chart in 1983. In 2010, it was awarded a gold certification from the Independent Music Companies Association, which indicated sales of at least 100,000 copies throughout Europe.

== Reception ==
In a positive review for Sounds, Penny Kiley wrote "This record, musically understated as it is, provides a quiet and necessary counterpart to some of the choices of listening we’ve had. We’ve lived so long with melodrama that we’ve forgotten there are other ways of showing passion."

== Track listing ==
All tracks are written by Tracey Thorn, except "Femme Fatale" by Lou Reed.

No.	Title	Length
1.	"Small Town Girl"	3:55
2.	"Simply Couldn't Care"	2:46
3.	"Seascape"	2:36
4.	"Femme Fatale"	2:39
5.	"Dreamy"	2:54
6.	"Plain Sailing"	2:05
7.	"New Opened Eyes"	2:56
8.	"Too Happy"	3:10

== Reissue ==
The album was reissued in an expanded edition on vinyl and CD by Cherry Red Records in 2024. There are five additional tracks selected by Tracey Thorn. Lucky Day was recorded at the same session as the original A Distant Shore tracks. The other four tracks are demo recordings from another session and were eventually re-worked for inclusion on Eden, the first album by Everything but the Girl.

== Reissue track listing ==
All tracks are written by Tracey Thorn, except "Femme Fatale" by Lou Reed.

No.	Title	Length
1.	"Small Town Girl"
2.	"Simply Couldn't Care"
3.	"Seascape"
4.	"Femme Fatale"
5.	"Dreamy"
6.	"Plain Sailing"
7.	"New Opened Eyes"
8.	"Too Happy"
9.	"Lucky Day (demo)"
10.	"Another Bridge (demo)"
11.	"Even So (demo)"
12.	"The Spice Of Life (demo)"
13.	"Fascination (demo)"

== Personnel ==
Credits adapted from liner notes.

- Tracey Thorn – vocals, acoustic guitar, electric guitar
- Pat Bermingham – recording
- Jane Fox – cover drawing

== Charts ==
Chart performance for A Distant Shore
Chart (2024)	Peak position
Scottish Albums (OCC)	74
UK Independent Albums (OCC)	35

== Certifications ==
Region	Certification	Certified units/sales
United Kingdom (BPI)	Silver	60,000^{^}
^{^} Shipments figures based on certification alone.
