= Tracey Thorn =

British singer (born 1962)

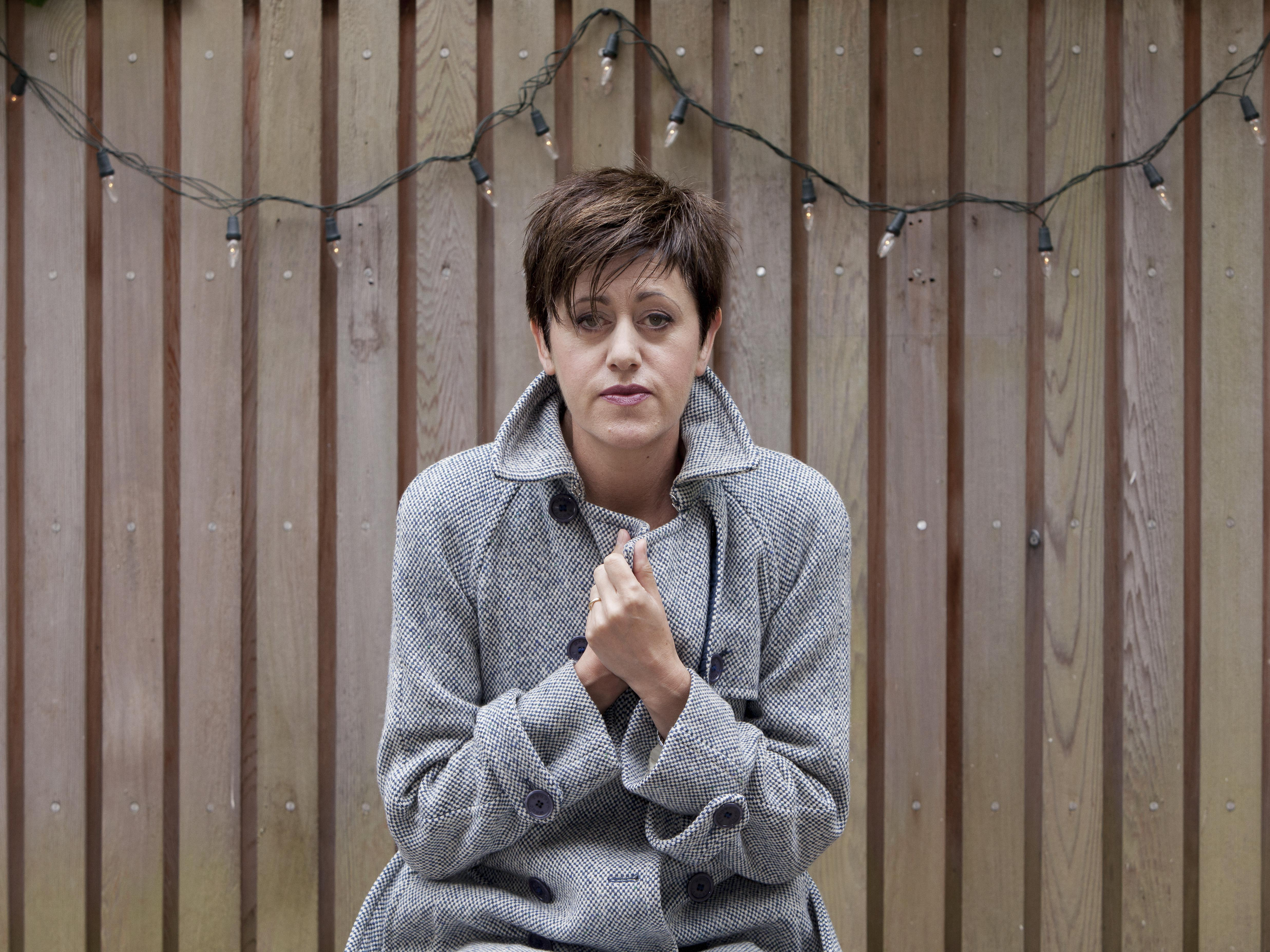
- Tracey Thorn in 2012
- Born: 26 September 1962 (age 64); Brookmans Park, Hertfordshire, England
- Occupations: Singer; songwriter
- Years active: 1979–present
- Spouse: Ben Watt (m. 2009)
- Children: 3
- Musical career
- Genres: Pop; alternative rock; folk; electronic; house
- Instruments: Vocals; Guitar
- Labels: Cherry Red (1980–1983); Blanco y Negro (1983–1994); Virgin (1995–2007); Strange Feeling (2010–present); Merge (2010–present)
- Website: traceythorn.com

Tracey Thorn (born 26 September 1962) is an English singer, songwriter, and author. She is best known as a member of the duo Everything but the Girl, active from 1982 to 2000, and again from 2022. She was in the band Marine Girls from 1980 to 1983. She has, at several junctures of her career, recorded and released albums as a solo artist, and has also written books, essays and columns.

== Early life ==
The youngest of three children, Thorn was born in Brookmans Park, Hertfordshire. She grew up in nearby Hatfield and studied English at the University of Hull, where she graduated in 1984 with First Class Honours. She later took an MA degree at Birkbeck, University of London.

== Music career ==
=== Stern Bops (1979–1980) ===
Thorn began her musical career in the punk-pop hybrid group Stern Bops playing guitar and providing some vocal backing.

=== Marine Girls (1980–1983) ===
Thorn then formed Marine Girls as primary songwriter, playing guitar and sharing vocals. The band released two albums (Beach Party in 1981 and Lazy Ways in 1983) and three singles. The group disbanded in 1983.

=== Everything but the Girl (1982–2000, 2023–) ===
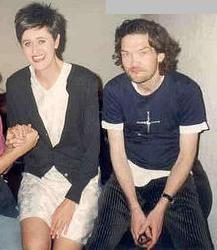
Thorn with Ben Watt in the late 1990s

Thorn met Ben Watt at the University of Hull where they were both students, and both signed as solo artists to Cherry Red Records. Their first album together was Eden, released in 1984. Everything but the Girl released a body of work that spanned two decades. Their biggest chart success came in 1995, when DJ Todd Terry remixed a song from their Amplified Heart album. "Missing" peaked at number three on the UK Singles Chart; topped the charts in Canada, Denmark, Germany, and Italy; and made the top ten in many countries, including Australia, France, Ireland, Sweden, and the United States.

Everything but the Girl was inactive from 2000 to 2022. During that time, Watt played on some filmed performances of Thorn's solo work and on her 2011 recording of the xx's "Night Time".

In November 2022, Watt and Thorn announced on social media that they had recorded a new album as Everything but the Girl. The album, titled Fuse, was released in April 2023.

=== Solo career and collaborations (1982–present) ===
Thorn's first solo work was a mini-album entitled A Distant Shore (1982). A re-recorded version of the track "Plain Sailing" was released as a single, and was included on the Pillows & Prayers Cherry Red records compilation album.

In the 1980s, Thorn contributed guest vocals and backing vocals for The Style Council on the track "The Paris Match" (from the album Café Bleu), The Go-Betweens on their track Head Full of Steam, Working Week on the single "Venceremos (We Will Win)" and Lloyd Cole and the Commotions on the track "Big Snake".

In the 1990s, she collaborated with Massive Attack on several projects, including the soundtrack for the motion picture Batman Forever where she contributed with "The Hunter Gets Captured by the Game". Their first project together was the song "Protection" (for which she wrote the lyrics and melody) from the album by Massive Attack of the same name. She also co-wrote and sings on the track "Better Things". She also sang "The Tree Knows Everything" on Adam F's debut album Colours and "Over the Rainbow" on James McMillan's 1993 Japan-only release Makin' Changes.

Just prior to her return to recording in 2007, Thorn contributed vocals to the song "Damage" by the band Tiefschwarz on the album Eat Books.

In March 2007, Thorn released her second solo album Out of the Woods on Virgin Records (Worldwide) and on Astralwerks (USA). It was produced by Ewan Pearson, who kept collaborating with her in subsequent releases. The first single from the album, "It's All True", accompanied by remixes from the likes of Kris Menace & Martin Buttrich, was released on 7 February and reached No. 75 on the UK singles chart while the album met critical acclaim and peaked at No. 38 on the Albums Chart.

In 2008, Thorn collaborated with the Hungarian acoustic downtempo group The Unbending Trees on their single "Overture", which also featured on their album Chemically Happy (Is The New Sad), released by her husband Ben Watt.

In 2009, Thorn collaborated with the Swedish singer-songwriter Jens Lekman for a cover of The Magnetic Fields' "Yeah! Oh Yeah!" for a compilation album commemorating twenty years of Merge Records, Score! 20 Years of Merge Records: The Covers!.

Thorn's third solo album Love and Its Opposite was released in May 2010 on Ben Watt's Strange Feeling Records in the UK, and on Merge Records in the US. Recorded in London and Berlin and produced by Ewan Pearson, it contained eight new songs and two cover versions, "Come on Home to Me" by Lee Hazlewood, and "You Are a Lover" by The Unbending Trees.

Thorn's fourth solo album was a Christmas album entitled Tinsel and Lights. It was released in late October 2012, and included covers of songs by Carol Hall, The White Stripes, Ron Sexsmith, Randy Newman, Joni Mitchell, Sufjan Stevens, Low and Scritti Politti, plus two original songs and contributions from Green Gartside and Ben Watt. The original song "Joy" is featured in the 2012 film All Is Bright with Paul Giamatti and Paul Rudd.

In 2013 Thorn wrote and recorded the original music for The Falling, the debut feature film by filmmaker Carol Morley, which premiered at the London Film Festival 2014.

In 2013 Thorn recorded two Molly Drake tracks for a documentary The Songs of Molly Drake, broadcast on BBC Radio 4. Molly Drake is the mother of the singer/songwriter Nick Drake.

A compilation album, Solo: Songs and Collaborations 1982–2015, was released in the UK on 23 October 2015. It has 34 tracks on two discs.

On 17 January 2018, Thorn announced the release of her album Record, which was released on 2 March. The album was produced by Ewan Pearson, and features contributions from Corinne Bailey Rae, Shura, Jona Ma and Stella and Jenny from Warpaint. Along with the announcement, Thorn released the debut single and video from the project, entitled "Queen".

== Writing ==
Virago published Thorn's memoir Bedsit Disco Queen: How I Grew Up and Tried to Be a Pop Star early in 2013. It received widespread critical acclaim and was a Sunday Times Top Ten best-seller.

In 2014, she began a regular column ('Off the Record') for the New Statesman. The column ran until spring of 2022. She resumed the column for some time, but it ended again in 2025.

In 2015 Virago published her second book, Naked at the Albert Hall, about singers and singing.

She published a third memoir in 2019: Another Planet: A Teenager in Suburbia (2019).

2021 saw the publication of a fourth book, My Rock 'n' Roll Friend, focused on her friendship with Lindy Morrison of the Go-Betweens, and on the experiences of female musicians in the male-dominated music scene.

== Personal life ==
After 28 years as a couple, Thorn and Ben Watt, the other half of Everything But The Girl, married in 2009 at Chelsea Register Office. They live in Hampstead, North London and have three children.

== Awards and nominations ==
Year	Awards	Work	Category	Result
1995	MTV Europe Music Awards	"Protection" (with Massive Attack)	Best Video	Won
1996	Brit Awards	"Protection" (with Massive Attack)	Best British Video	Nominated
2011	International Dance Music Awards	"Why Does the Wind?"	Best House/Garage Track	Nominated
2017	Artist and Manager Awards	Herself	Artists’ Artist Award	Won
2018	AIM Independent Music Awards	Herself	Outstanding Contribution to Music	Won
2018	Classic Pop Reader Awards	Herself	Artist of the Year	Nominated
2018	Classic Pop Reader Awards	Record	Album of the Year	Nominated
2018	Classic Pop Reader Awards	'"Queen"	Single of the Year	Nominated
2018	Best Art Vinyl	Record	Best Art Vinyl	Nominated
2019	GAFFA-Prisen Awards	Herself	Best International Artist	Nominated
2019	GAFFA-Prisen Awards	Record	Best International Album	Nominated

== Discography ==
=== Studio albums ===
List of studio albums, with selected details and chart positions
Title	Album details	Peak chart positions				
Title	Album details	UK	AUS	GRE	SWE	US
A Distant Shore	Released: September 1982; Label: Cherry Red	—	—	—	—	—
Out of the Woods	Released: 5 March 2007; Label: Virgin/Astralwerks	38	86	—	44	172
Love and Its Opposite	Released: 17 May 2010; Label: Strange Feeling/Merge	51	—	16	22	144
Tinsel and Lights	Released: 29 October 2012; Label: Strange Feeling	94	—	—	—	—
Record	Released: 2 March 2018	15	—	—	—	—

=== EPs ===
- 2010 – Opposites EP (contains experimental remixes of tracks from Love and Its Opposite)
- 2011 – You Are A Lover EP (10" green vinyl released for Record Store Day)
- 2011 – Night Time EP
- 2014 – Molly Drake Songs

=== Compilations ===
- 2011 – Extended Plays 2010–2011
- 2015 – Solo: Songs and Collaborations 1982–2015

=== Singles ===
Year	Title	Album
1982	"Plain Sailing"	A Distant Shore
2007	"It's All True"	Out of the Woods
2007	"Raise the Roof"	Out of the Woods
2007	"Grand Canyon"	Out of the Woods
2007	"King's Cross"	Out of the Woods
2010	"Oh, the Divorces!"	Love and its Opposite
2010	"Why Does the Wind?"	Love and its Opposite
2011	"You Are a Lover"	Love and its Opposite
2011	"Night Time"	Night Time EP
2012	"In the Cold, Cold Night"	Tinsel and Lights
2012	"Tinsel and Lights"	Tinsel and Lights
2012	"Joy"	Tinsel and Lights
2018	"Queen"	Record

=== Collaborations ===
Year	Song	Album
1984	"Venceremos (We Will Win)" with Working Week	single only
1984	"The Paris Match" with The Style Council	Chilled Jazz with The Style Council and Cafe Bleu (Style Council album)
1986	"Head Full of Steam" with The Go-Betweens	Liberty Belle and the Black Diamond Express
1986	"Apology Accepted" with The Go-Betweens	Liberty Belle and the Black Diamond Express
1987	"Big Snake" with Lloyd Cole and the Commotions	Mainstream
1993	"Over the Rainbow" with James McMillan	Makin' Changes by James McMillan
1994	"Protection" with Massive Attack	Protection (Massive Attack)
1994	"Better Things" with Massive Attack	Protection (Massive Attack)
1995	"The Hunter Gets Captured by the Game" with Massive Attack	Batman Forever
1997	"The Tree Knows Everything" with Adam F	Colours (Adam F)
2007	"Damage" with Tiefschwarz	Eat Books (Tiefschwarz)
2008	"Overture" with The Unbending Trees	Chemically Happy (Is the New Sad)
2009	"Yeah! Oh Yeah!" with Jens Lekman	Score! 20 Years of Merge Records: The Covers!
2010	"Without Me" with Tevo Howard	
2012	"Taking Down The Tree" with Green Gartside	Tinsel and Lights
2015	"Disappointing" with John Grant	Grey Tickles, Black Pressure

== Sources ==
- Bedsit Disco Queen; How I Grew Up and Tried to Be a Pop Star by Tracey Thorn, ISBN 978-1-84408-866-9, Little Brown (2013)
