= Ewan Pearson =

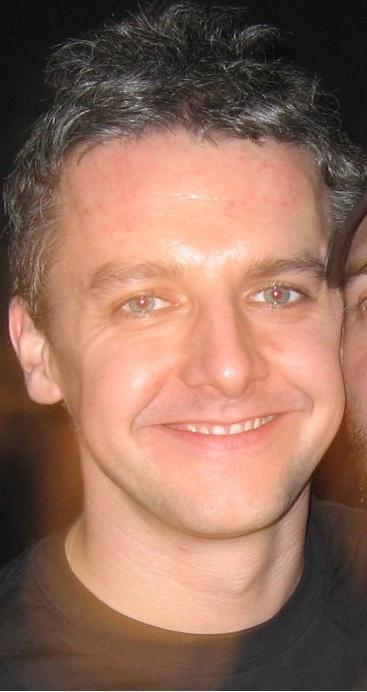
- Ewan Pearson in November 2006

Background information
- Also known as: Maas, Sulky Pup, Villa America, World of Apples, Dirtbox
- Born: 1 April 1972 (age 52)
- Genres: Electronic
- Occupation(s): Producer, Remixer
- Labels: Soma
- Website: EwanPearson.com

Ewan Pearson (born 1 April 1972) is an English electronic music producer/remixer who works under various aliases including Maas, Sulky Pup, Villa America, World of Apples, and Dirtbox. He is also in Partial Arts with Al Usher. He has remixed for artists such as Cortney Tidwell, Seelenluft, Ladytron, Depeche Mode, The Rapture, Goldfrapp, and The Chemical Brothers. In 2001, Soma Quality Recordings released Small Change, an album whose content was exclusively remix work from Pearson under his guises World of Apples and Maas. His production credits include "Pieces of the People We Love" from The Rapture, as well as Ladytron, Chikinki, Envoy and Jeb Loy Nichols and he programmed two tracks for Gwen Stefani's solo album Love. Angel. Music. Baby. He plays on M83's album Saturdays = Youth. He recently completed production on Tracey Thorn's fourth solo album, Record, which was released in March 2018.

== Early life ==
Pearson (born 1 April 1972) grew up in Kidderminster where he attended Franche Middle School and Wolverley High School in Wolverley. His father had a keen interest in guitar and played in folk bands. This may have been an early inspiration for Ewan who played both piano and cello in his youth. Indeed, his early interest in synthesisers and programming led him to collaborate with schoolmates Gareth James and James Hill in the band "Sample the Dog". Most of the material was covers of Ewan's heroes New Order, Depeche Mode etc., but he also tried his hand at writing. Pearson admits in recent interviews that his writing was somewhat derivative, but it was his natural ability to accurately reproduce the sounds of his favourite synth bands that gave him a good grounding in programming and production. It was during this time that he developed his trademark production style that can still be heard in his work today. He attended Girton College, Cambridge, where he studied English literature and graduated with a first. He went on to study a master's degree in philosophy and cultural studies at Royal Holloway, University of London which focused in part on the place of dance music in popular culture and resulted in the publication of "Discographies" which he co-wrote with Jeremy Gilbert.

== DJ career and production work ==
Pearson's love of dance music led him to begin DJing whilst still working in his home studio. His first 12" single "Motorcade" was released by small, Birmingham based label Bostin' Records under the artist name "Villa America", the cover of the record was vivid claret and blue which Ewan says had nothing to do with local football team Aston Villa. His success with his first few releases led to interest and eventually a long, successful deal with Soma recordings. Soon the remixes began to take over and it is here that Ewan has had most success and indeed it is where he gets most of his professional satisfaction. He continues to successfully juggle DJing and working in the studio. Pearson regularly appears at Fabric in London, Manumission and Space in Ibiza, the Pulp in Paris, and PanoramaBar in Berlin.

== Discography ==
=== Albums ===
1997	Latitude (as Maas) (Soma Quality Recordings)
2001	Small Change (Soma Quality Recordings)

=== Compilations ===
2007	Piece Work (!K7)

=== Mix albums ===
2005	Sc.Fi. Hi.Fi Volume 1 (Soma Quality Recordings)
2007	Fabric 35 (Fabric Records)
2010	We Are Proud of Our Choices (Kompakt Records)

=== Remixes ===
2000	Stargazer – "Deeper"
2001	Count Zero – "Blue Boogaloo"; Deem-C – "Floating"; Russ Gabriel – "We Will Be Turning"; Jaymz Nylon – "I Know a Place"; Only Child – "Getting It On"
2002	Black Strobe – "Me and Madonna"; Chris Cowie – "Deep Within"; Fifth Level – "Jump Up"; Freeform Five – "Perspex Sex"; Slam feat. Dot Allison – "Visions"
2003	The Chemical Brothers – "The Golden Path"; The Flaws – "Freek"; Futureshock – "Pride's Paranoia"; Goldfrapp – "Strict Machine"; Goldfrapp – "Train"; Ladytron – "Evil"; Midnight Star – "Midas Touch"; Mint Royale – "Blue Song"; Erlend Øye – "Sudden Rush"; Playgroup – "Make It Happen"; Seelenluft – "Manila"; Swag – "Where I Belong"
2004	Closer Musik – "One, Two, Three – No Gravity"; Depeche Mode – "Enjoy the Silence"; Mocky – "Catch a Moment in Time"; The Rapture – "I Need Your Love"
2005	Alter Ego – "Beat the Bush"; Feist – "Inside & Out"; Moby – "Raining Again"; Röyksopp – "49 Percent"; Silicone Soul – "The Poisoner's Diary"; Silver City – "Shiver"
2006	Franz Ferdinand – "Outsiders"; Goldfrapp – "Ride a White Horse"; Pet Shop Boys – "Psychological"
2007	Cortney Tidwell – "Don't Let Stars Keep Us Tangled Up"
2009	Junior Boys – "Hazel"
2017	Depeche Mode – "Where's the Revolution"
2018	Steven Wilson – "Permanating"
2023	Al Usher - "The Evenings"

== Bibliography ==
- Discographies : dance music, culture, and the politics of sound, Jeremy Gilbert and Ewan Pearson, Routledge, 1999 ISBN 0-415-17033-8

== Interviews ==
- Ewan Pearson: Mix work – Resident Advisor Feb, 2010
