= Ben Watt =

British musician (born 1962)

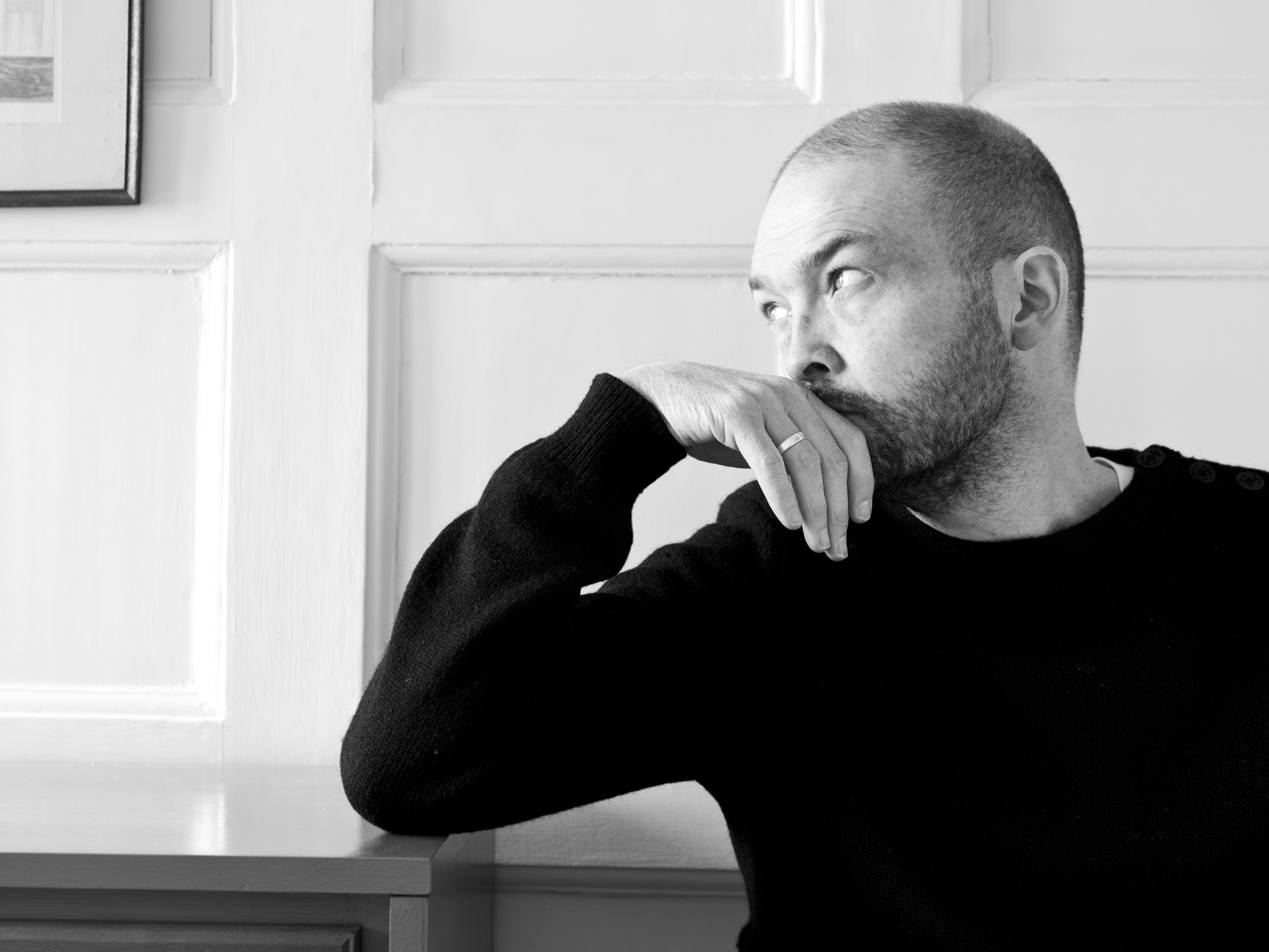
- Watt in 2013

Background information
- Born: Benjamin Brian Thomas Watt; 6 December 1962 (age 63); Marylebone, London, England
- Origin: Barnes, London, England
- Genres: Alternative rock; new wave; house; electronica; folk rock
- Occupations: Musician; singer; DJ; author; producer; radio presenter
- Instruments: Vocals; guitar; keyboards; synthesizer; piano; organ; turntable; programming
- Years active: 1981–present
- Labels: Cherry Red; Blanco y Negro; Sire; Warner Bros.; Atlantic; Virgin; Buzzin' Fly; Strange Feeling
- Spouse: Tracey Thorn (m. 2009)
- Website: benwatt.com

Benjamin Brian Thomas Watt (born 6 December 1962) is a British musician, singer, songwriter, author, DJ, and radio presenter, best known as a member of the duo Everything but the Girl.

== Early life ==
Watt was born in Marylebone, London, and grew up in Barnes, the son of Scottish jazz bandleader and arranger Tommy Watt and Welsh showbusiness writer Romany Bain. He has four older half-brothers and half-sisters.

== Recording artist ==
Watt began recording in 1981 on the indie label Cherry Red. His first single 'Cant' was produced by folk-maverick Kevin Coyne and featured Richard Allen on viola and tambourine. His second release, 1982's 5-track EP Summer into Winter featured Robert Wyatt on backing vocals and piano. His debut album North Marine Drive was released in 1983 and reached UK Independent Album Charts Top 10. He then put his solo career on hold and joined forces with vocalist Tracey Thorn, with whom he wrote and recorded for 17 years—together they created nine studio albums as Everything but the Girl (EBTG) after signing to Blanco Y Negro through Warners in 1984, and then Virgin in 1995. EBTG have received eight gold, and one platinum album BPI Certifications in the UK, and one gold album RIAA Certification in the US. The song Missing reached number two on the US Billboard Hot 100 in 1996.

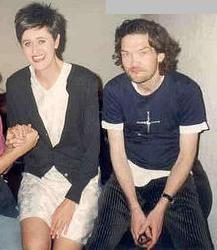
Watt with Tracey Thorn in the late 1990s

Following EBTG's self-imposed hiatus in 2000, Watt immersed himself in the world of underground electronic music both as a DJ and recording artist/producer. His recorded output during this period includes club tracks such as Lone Cat (Holding On), A Stronger Man featuring Sananda Maitreya (formerly known as Terence Trent D'Arby), the Outspoken EP Part 1 including Pop a Cap in Yo' Ass featuring Estelle, Just a Blip and Guinea Pig.

In 2014 Watt returned to his folk-jazz roots and released Hendra, his first solo album since 1983, the content of which was recorded with a new band including Bernard Butler, formerly of the band Suede—Watt explained that he knew that Butler would be the "perfect counterpoint to bring some darkness to the light." Watt also worked with Berlin-based producer Ewan Pearson, and David Gilmour of Pink Floyd. The album was released on a new record label, Unmade Road, founded by Watt in 2014. Watt completed over 60 live shows in support of Hendra including tours of UK, North America, Japan and Australia. The album won the 'Best 'Difficult' Second Album' category at the AIM Independent Music Awards 2014. It was included at No 27 in Uncut's Top 75 Albums of 2014. Rolling Stone (Germany) made it number two in its list of the best albums of 2014. Japan's Music Magazine made it their No 3 best album of 2014.

April 2016 saw the release of his third solo album Fever Dream. Self-produced at RAK Studios in London, it continued his relationship with Bernard Butler, and added guest cameos from MC Taylor of North Carolina folk-rock band, Hiss Golden Messenger, and Boston singer-songwriter Marissa Nadler. It received a 9/10 review in Uncut magazine. In a four-star review, The Guardian said: "In his early 50s, he is making some of the best music of his career."

In late 2022, Watt and Thorn announced a new Everything but the Girl album. Fuse, released in April 2023, was the first EBTG album released in 24 years.

== Writer ==
Watt's first memoir, Patient – The True Story of a Rare Illness (Penguin, 1996), describes his life-changing ordeal with eosinophilic granulomatosis with polyangiitis, a rare life-threatening autoimmune disease with which he was diagnosed and hospitalized in 1992, on the eve of a North American tour with Everything But The Girl. "An astonishingly assured anatomy of his ordeal, by turns terrifying, mordantly funny and intensely moving. Many people suffer the pain and indignities of intensive medical treatment; but few have written about it with quite such alarming vividness or clarity", wrote Mick Bown in The Daily Telegraph. The book was listed as a New York Times Notable Book of the Year, a Sunday Times Book of the Year chosen by William Boyd and a Village Voice Literary Supplement Favorite Book of the Year, and was also a finalist for the Esquire-Waterstones Best Non-Fiction Award in the UK.

His second memoir, Romany and Tom—a portrait of his parents' lives and marriage—was published by Bloomsbury in February 2014. "Neither sentimental nor savage, yet often wise, moving and entertaining within the same paragraph, Romany and Tom is a major achievement to rival any of Watt's recordings", said The Guardian. "Watt captures what real life feels like, and he captures it with breathtaking clarity, beauty, and precision", said the Los Angeles Review of Books. In September 2014 it was long-listed for the Samuel Johnson Prize 2014.

== DJ, remixer, label owner ==
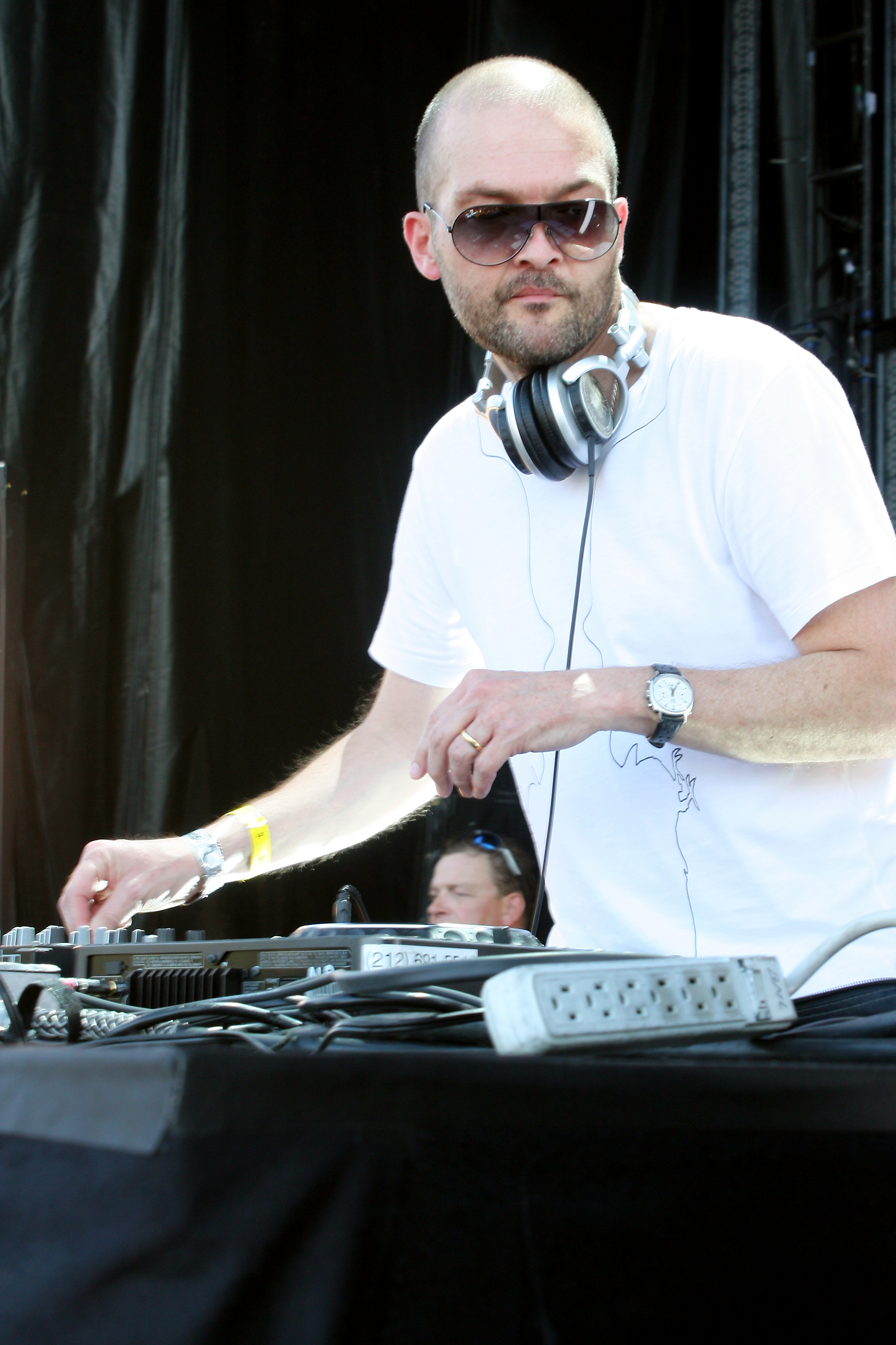
Watt performing in 2009

=== Lazy Dog (1998–2003) ===
In 1998 Watt established the London deep house Sunday club night and compilation series Lazy Dog with Jay Hannan. The club night – where both Watt and Hannan DJ'd in a tag-team style – was hosted twice-monthly at the Notting Hill Arts Club in west London, and later every two months at The End in central London. Success led to appearances at the Miami Winter Music Conference and several tours of the United States. Watt produced a string of dance remixes for Sade, Sunshine Anderson, Zero 7, Maxwell, Meshell Ndegeocello and Sandy Rivera. Lazy Dog ended on 16 May 2003 with a farewell closing party at The End in central London. Two mix compilations – Lazy Dog Vol. 1 and Lazy Dog Vol. 2 were released by Virgin Records in 2000 and 2001 respectively.

=== Neighbourhood and Cherry Jam (2002–2005) ===
For three years between 2002 and 2005, Watt was a co-owner/founder of the West London nightclubs Neighbourhood and Cherry Jam. Under Watt's creative direction Cherry Jam hosted underground club nights, art exhibitions, the inaugural events for the long-running spoken word night Book Slam and The Libertines' official debut show. At Neighbourhood, Watt brought in artists such as Groove Armada and many international DJs to perform at his own in-house club nights. Watt also hosted the 25th Anniversary of the Rough Trade Records music label and the inaugural House Music Awards ceremony.

=== Buzzin' Fly Records (2003–present) ===
In April 2003, Watt launched his own independent deep house and techno record label Buzzin' Fly Records (named after the Tim Buckley song). The label proceeded to foster the careers of young and emerging producers/DJs such as Justin Martin, Mademoiselle Caro & Franck Garcia, and Rodamaal. The label hosted Watt's own club productions as well as work from remixers such as Ame, Radio Slave, Charles Webster and John Tejada. Between 2003 and 2007 Watt also compiled and mixed four compilation albums, Buzzin' Fly Volumes 1–4, mixing tracks from the label with tracks from other artists.

Buzzin' Fly won Best Breakthrough Label at the House Music Awards in 2004, and was awarded the Runner-up Best British Label by the DJ Magazine Awards in both 2007 and 2008. In April 2013, on the label's tenth anniversary, Watt announced he was scaling back the label's activities to focus more fully on his own creative work.

After a period of relative inactivity in 2017 Buzzin' Fly took control of the majority of the Everything But The Girl back catalogue, previously held by Warner Music. The transfer of rights was the result of Warner Music's obligation to release assets into the independent sector as part of the conditions surrounding its acquisition of EMI assets from Universal Music. A licensing deal with Chrysalis Records was simultaneously arranged for the shared curation of the catalogue. A new Buzzin' Fly website was launched the same year presenting a new home for all three labels within the Buzzin' Fly group – Buzzin' Fly, Strange Feeling and Unmade Road.

=== DJ ===
After several years of mostly London residencies, Watt performed as a DJ on the festival circuit in 2005, appearing at the Good Vibrations Festival in Australia, Homelands and Lovebox in the UK, Coachella in the US, and Ireland's Electric Picnic. In 2008 he opened the Sonar Festival in Barcelona, appeared at the Exit Festival the same year and was a resident DJ from 2007 to 2009 at We Love Sundays on the Space Terrace in Ibiza. Giant Step promoted his three-year residency at Cielo in New York, and he played on the main stage at the inaugural Electric Zoo Festival on New York City's Randall's Island in 2009. He was nominated four years running (2008–2011) as Best Deep House DJ at the global DJ Awards held in Ibiza, and for Outstanding Contribution to Dance Music at the DJ Magazine Best of British Awards 2009.

=== Strange Feeling Records (2007–present) ===
Building upon the foundation of Buzzin' Fly, Watt launched Strange Feeling Records in 2007 as a sister label that would release alternative/indie music. The critically acclaimed Copenhagen band Figurines and the Hungarian trio The Unbending Trees were early signings of Strange Feeling. The label globally released and distributed the third solo album Love and Its Opposite by Watt's wife Tracey Thorn on 17 May 2010; the album was the label's fifth release. This was followed by her alternative Christmas album, Tinsel and Lights, in 2012. 2015 saw the release of Thorn's original soundtrack to The Falling – the debut feature film by British film director Carol Morley.

=== Unmade Road (2014–present) ===
In 2014, Watt launched Unmade Road, a new label and production company to act as a vehicle for his return to recording and touring as a singer-songwriter. He secured a licensing deal for the label with Caroline International. The label released Watt's albums Hendra in 2014 and Fever Dream in 2016.

== Radio presenter ==
In 2006, Watt launched the online Buzzin' Fly radio show to showcase upcoming music from the label, new releases and guest mixes. It was re-broadcast on the Galaxy Network and Kiss. In 2009, after more than 150 editions, Watt presented his last show and accepted an invitation to move to the BBC Radio 6 Music's flagship electronic radio show as a resident DJ on the 6 Mix; this show was cancelled in 2014.

== Personal life ==
Watt lives with his spouse and creative partner Tracey Thorn in Hampstead, north London. They met at Hull University in 1981; after 27 years together, they married in 2009 at the Chelsea Register Office. They have three children.

In 1992, Watt was diagnosed with Eosinophilic granulomatosis with polyangiitis (EGPA), an extremely rare and potentially deadly autoimmune condition. He eventually had 5 m (15 ft) of necrotized small intestine removed (about 75%), leaving him on a permanently restricted diet. He later wrote the memoir Patient about his experiences with the disease and recovery.

Watt is part of an environmental advocacy group that advocates for cleanup and care of the Welsh Harp reservoir. He launched the group Cool Oak as part of his advocacy.

== Discography ==
=== Albums ===
- North Marine Drive (1983, Cherry Red)
- Hendra (2014, Unmade Road dist. by Caroline International) UK No. 46
- Fever Dream (2016, Unmade Road) UK No. 53
- Storm Damage (January 2020, Unmade Road)

=== Singles and EPs ===
- Cant (June 1981, Cherry Red)
- Summer into Winter EP with Robert Wyatt (March 1982, Cherry Red)
- Some Things Don't Matter (February 1983, Cherry Red)
- Lone Cat (Holding On) (April 2003, Buzzin' Fly)
- Buzzin' Fly Vol 1 EP includes A Stronger Man with Sananda Maitreya (January 2004, Buzzin' Fly)
- Outspoken Part 1 includes Pop a Cap in Yo' Ass with Estelle and Attack, Attack, Attack with Baby Blak (January 2005, Buzzin' Fly)
- Buzzin' Fly Vol 2 EP includes Lone Cat (Holding On) (Justin Martin Remix) and Pop a Cap in Yo Ass (Dubstrumental) by Ben Watt with Estelle (April 2005, Buzzin' Fly)
- We Are Silver EP includes Old Soul with Baby Blak, and Lone Cat (Dennis Ferrer & Steve Martinez Special Re-Rub) (April 2007, Buzzin' Fly)
- Buzzin' Fly Vol 4 EP includes Just a Blip (June 2007, Buzzin' Fly)
- Guinea Pig (October 2008, Buzzin' Fly)
- Bright Star by Stimming, Ben Watt & Julia Biel (Feb 2010, Buzzin' Fly)
- Forget (includes acoustic version of The Levels recorded with David Gilmour). (July 2014, Unmade Road)
- Golden Ratio EP (remixes by Charles Webster/Ewan Pearson) (Dec 2014, Buzzin' Fly)
- Gradually (Jan 2016, Unmade Road)
- Between Two Fires (Feb 2016, Unmade Road)
- Storm Shelter EP (April 2021, Unmade Road)

=== Compilations mixed by Ben Watt ===
- Lazy Dog Vol. 1 with Jay Hannan (October 2000, Virgin)
- Back to Mine with Tracey Thorn as Everything but the Girl (May 2001, DMC)
- Lazy Dog Vol. 2 with Jay Hannan (March 2002, Virgin)
- Buzzin' Fly Vol 1: Replenishing Music for the Modern Soul (March 2004, Buzzin' Fly)
- Buzzin' Fly Vol 2: Replenishing Music for the Modern Soul (April 2005, Buzzin' Fly)
- InTheMix 2006 (Australian release; 2 CDs; one compiled and mixed by Ben Watt, one by Ivan Gough) (November 2006, inthemix.com.au)
- Buzzin' Fly Vol 3 (June 2006, Buzzin' Fly)
- Buzzin' Fly Vol 4 (May 2007, Buzzin' Fly)
- Buzzin' Fly – 5 Golden Years in the Wilderness (Compiled and unmixed by Ben Watt) (June 2008, Buzzin' Fly)
