= Paul Weller discography =

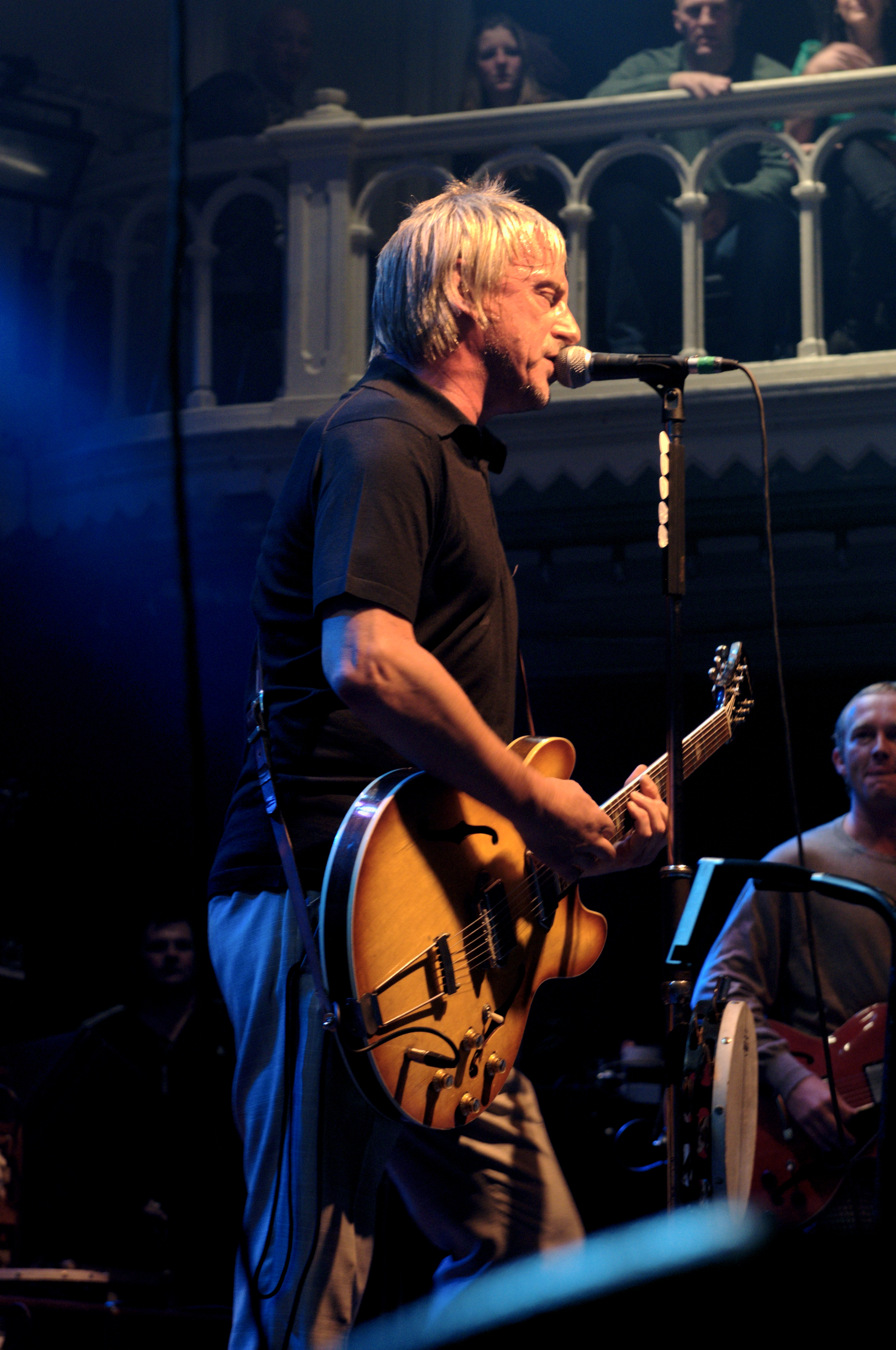
- Studio albums: 18
- Extended plays: 3
- Live albums: 4
- Compilation albums: 4
- Singles: 39
- Video albums: 13

The discography of Paul Weller, a solo artist previously a member of the Jam and the Style Council, consists of eighteen studio albums, five live albums, thirty-nine singles (not including re-releases or collaborations) and three extended plays (EPs).

Weller's first solo release was "Into Tomorrow", released under the banner of the Paul Weller Movement. Despite a modest performance on the UK Singles Chart, the subsequent "Uh Huh, Oh Yeh" broke into the top 20. Renewed interest in his work in the Britpop era resulted in 1995's Stanley Road providing his first two solo top ten singles. Weller's album chart performance has been especially strong, with six number one and seven number two albums. He has also scored five top ten and nineteen top twenty singles. He has also achieved significant chart activity in Japan.

== Discography ==
=== Studio albums ===
Year	Album	Peak chart positions													Certifications (sales thresholds)
Year	Album	UK	AUS	AUT	BEL	FRA	GER	IRE	ITA	NLD	NOR	SWE	SWI	US	Certifications (sales thresholds)
1992	Paul Weller: Label: Go! Discs; Released: 1 September 1992	8	108	—	—	—	—	—	—	—	—	—	—	—	BPI: Gold
1993	Wild Wood: Label: Go! Discs; Released: 6 September 1993	2	135	—	—	—	—	—	—	—	—	42	—	—	BPI: Platinum
1995	Stanley Road: Label: Go! Discs; Released: 15 May 1995	1	65	—	—	—	—	—	—	18	—	37	—	—	BPI: 4× Platinum
1997	Heavy Soul: Label: Island; Released: 23 June 1997	2	100	—	—	—	—	—	—	80	—	—	—	—	BPI: Gold
2000	Heliocentric: Label: Island; Released: 10 April 2000	2	106	—	—	—	90	13	—	—	—	—	—	—	BPI: Gold
2002	Illumination: Label: Independiente; Released: 16 September 2002	1	74	—	—	—	69	18	—	69	—	—	—	—	BPI: Gold
2004	Studio 150: Label: V2; Released: 13 September 2004	2	192	—	53	155	35	5	29	36	—	—	—	—	BPI: Gold
2005	As Is Now: Label: Yep Roc; Released: 10 October 2005	4	—	66	72	—	27	24	29	89	—	—	—	—	BPI: Gold
2008	22 Dreams: Label: Island; Released: 2 June 2008	1	30	49	27	—	30	6	34	30	38	—	—	—	BPI: Gold
2010	Wake Up the Nation: Label: Island; Released: 19 April 2010	2	63	—	11	181	30	8	49	60	29	—	—	—	BPI: Gold
2012	Sonik Kicks: Label: Yep Roc; Released: 19 March 2012	1	72	74	33	—	57	18	60	60	—	—	—	166	BPI: Silver
2015	Saturns Pattern: Label: Parlophone; Released: 18 May 2015	2	58	58	30	169	35	9	33	22	—	—	83	—	BPI: Silver
2017	A Kind Revolution: Label: Parlophone; Released: 12 May 2017	5	93	45	25	—	49	11	24	45	—	—	—	—	
2018	True Meanings: Label: Parlophone; Released: 14 September 2018	2	111	28	17	199	19	10	29	61	—	—	51	—	BPI: Silver
2020	On Sunset: Label: Polydor; Released: 3 July 2020	1	96	20	15	152	11	4	—	30	—	—	15	—	
2021	Fat Pop (Volume 1): Label: Polydor; Released: 14 May 2021	1	—	21	15	—	8	2	74	47	—	—	69	—	
2024	66: Label: Polydor; Released: 24 May 2024	4	166	12	18	—	16	9	73	41	—	—	41	—	
2025	Find El Dorado: Label: Parlophone; Released: 25 July 2025	5	—	35	73	—	52	38	—	—	—	—	49	—	

=== Live albums ===
Year	Title	Peak chart positions		Certifications (sales thresholds)
Year	Title	UK	AUS	Certifications (sales thresholds)
1994	Live Wood	13	163	BPI: Gold
2001	Days of Speed	3	—	BPI: Gold
2006	Catch-Flame!	17	—	
2008	Live at the Royal Albert Hall	116	—	BPI: Gold
2009	Just a Dream: 22 Dreams Live	—	—	
2011	Find the Torch, Burn the Plans	72	—	
2019	Other Aspects – Live at the Royal Festival Hall	10	—	
2021	An Orchestrated Songbook (with Jules Buckley and the BBC Symphony Orchestra)	4	—	

=== Compilation albums ===
Title	Year	UK peak	Certifications
Modern Classics: The Greatest Hits	1998	7	BPI: 2× Platinum
Fly on the Wall: B Sides & Rarities	2003	22	
Hit Parade (Contains tracks recorded by The Jam and The Style Council, as well as solo tracks)	2006	7	BPI: 2× Platinum
Weller at the BBC	2008	32	BPI: Silver
More Modern Classics	2014	6	
Will of the People	2022	15	
Weller at the BBC (Vol. 2)	2026	19	

=== EPs ===
Title	Year	UK peak
The Weaver	1993	18
Friday Street (A Heavy Soul EP)	1997	—
As Is Now	2006	—
When Your Garden's Overgrown	2012	—
Dragonfly	2012	—
Saturns Peaks	2015	—
Jawbone: Original Motion Picture Score	2017	44
In Another Room	2020	—
On Sunset - Remixes	2020	—
Whoosh	2022	—
Supplement: 66	2024	—

=== Singles ===
Year	Single	Peak chart positions					Certifications	Album
Year	Single	UK	AUS	IRE	ITA	NLD	Certifications	Album
1991	"Into Tomorrow" (The Paul Weller Movement)	36	—	—	—	—		Paul Weller
1992	"Uh Huh, Oh Yeh"	18	121	—	—	—		Paul Weller
1992	"Above the Clouds"	47	—	—	—	—		Paul Weller
1993	"Kosmos" (Note: DJ promo only)	—	—	—	—	—		Paul Weller
1993	"Bull-Rush" (Note: USA/Japan-only single)	—	—	—	—	—		Paul Weller
1993	"Sunflower"	16	166	—	—	—		Wild Wood
1993	"Wild Wood"	14	—	—	—	35	BPI: Silver	Wild Wood
1994	"Hung Up"	11	—	—	—	—		Wild Wood
1994	"Out of the Sinking"	20	—	—	—	—		Stanley Road
1995	"The Changingman"	7	131	21	—	—	BPI: Silver	Stanley Road
1995	"You Do Something to Me"	9	142	76	27	21	BPI: Platinum	Stanley Road
1995	"Broken Stones"	20	—	—	—	—	BPI: Silver	Stanley Road
1996	"Out of the Sinking" (Reissue)	16	—	—	—	—		Stanley Road
1996	"Peacock Suit"	5	164	—	—	—		Heavy Soul
1997	"Brushed"	14	—	—	—	—		Heavy Soul
1997	"Friday Street"	21	—	—	—	—		Heavy Soul
1997	"Mermaids"	30	—	—	—	—		Heavy Soul
1997	"Heavy Soul (Pt. 1)"	—	—	—	—	—		Heavy Soul
1997	"I Should Have Been There to Inspire You" (Note: USA promo only)	—	—	—	—	—		Heavy Soul
1998	"Brand New Start"	16	—	—	—	—		Modern Classics: The Greatest Hits
1999	"Wild Wood" (Reissue)	22	—	—	—	—		Modern Classics: The Greatest Hits
2000	"He's the Keeper"	—	—	—	—	—		Heliocentric
2000	"Sweet Pea, My Sweet Pea"	44	—	—	—	—		Heliocentric
2002	"It's Written in the Stars"	7	—	—	—	—		Illumination
2002	"Leafy Mysteries"	23	—	—	—	—		Illumination
2002	"Brother to Brother" (Terry Callier with Paul Weller)	81	—	—	—	—		—N/a
2004	"The Bottle"	13	—	—	—	—		Studio 150
2004	"Wishing on a Star"	11	—	46	—	97		Studio 150
2004	"Thinking of You"	18	—	—	—	—		Studio 150
2005	"Early Morning Rain"	40	—	—	—	—		Studio 150
2005	"Come Together"	40	—	—	—	—		—N/a
2005	"From the Floorboards Up"	6	—	31	—	—		As Is Now
2005	"Come On/Let's Go"	15	—	49	38	—		As Is Now
2005	"Here's the Good News"	21	—	—	—	—		As Is Now
2006	"Wild Blue Yonder"	22	—	—	46	—		—N/a
2007	"This Old Town" (Graham Coxon with Paul Weller)	39	—	—	—	—		—N/a
2007	"Are You Trying to Be Lonely?" (Andy Lewis & Paul Weller)	31	—	—	—	—		—N/a
2008	"Have You Made Up Your Mind?"	19	—	—	—	—		22 Dreams
2008	"Echoes Round the Sun"	19	—	—	—	—		22 Dreams
2008	"All I Wanna Do (Is Be With You)"	28	—	—	—	—		22 Dreams
2008	"Push It Along"	28	—	—	—	—		22 Dreams
2008	"Sea Spray"	59	—	—	—	—		22 Dreams
2008	"22 Dreams"	59	—	—	—	—		22 Dreams
2009	"7&3 is the Striker's Name"	—	—	—	—	—		Wake Up the Nation
2010	"No Tears to Cry"	26	—	—	—	—		Wake Up the Nation
2010	"Wake Up the Nation"	26	—	—	—	—		Wake Up the Nation
2010	"Find the Torch, Burn the Plans"	68	—	—	—	—		Wake Up the Nation
2010	"Fast Car/Slow Traffic"	109	—	—	—	—		Wake Up the Nation
2010	"Aim High"	—	—	—	—	—		Wake Up the Nation
2011	"Starlite"	113	—	—	—	—		—N/a
2011	"Around the Lake"	—	—	—	—	—		Sonik Kicks
2012	"That Dangerous Age"	66	—	—	—	—		Sonik Kicks
2012	"Birthday"	64	—	—	—	—		—N/a
2012	"The Attic"	—	—	—	—	—		Sonik Kicks
2013	"Flame-Out!" / "The Olde Original"	132	—	—	—	—		More Modern Classics
2014	"Brand New Toy"	—	—	—	—	—		More Modern Classics
2015	"White Sky"	—	—	—	—	—		Saturns Pattern
2015	"Saturns Pattern"	—	—	—	—	—		Saturns Pattern
2015	"Going My Way"	—	—	—	—	—		Saturns Pattern
2015	"I'm Where I Should Be"	—	—	—	—	—		Saturns Pattern
2015	"Pick It Up"	—	—	—	—	—		Saturns Pattern
2017	"Long Long Road"	— (Note: "Long Long Road" did not enter the UK Singles Chart, but debuted and peaked at number 89 on the UK Singles Downloads Chart.)	—	—	—	—		A Kind Revolution
2017	"Mother Ethiopia"	—	—	—	—	—		—N/a
2017	"Woo Sé Mama"	—	—	—	—	—		A Kind Revolution
2017	"The Cranes Are Back"	—	—	—	—	—		A Kind Revolution
2017	"One Tear"	—	—	—	—	—		A Kind Revolution
2018	"Aspects"	—	—	—	—	—		True Meanings
2018	"Movin' On"	—	—	—	—	—		True Meanings
2018	"The Soul Searchers"	—	—	—	—	—		True Meanings
2018	"Gravity"	— (Note: "Gravity" did not enter the UK Singles Chart, but debuted and peaked at number 95 on the UK Singles Downloads Chart.)	—	—	—	—		True Meanings
2020	"Earth Beat"	—	—	—	—	—		On Sunset
2020	"Village"	— (Note: "Village" did not enter the UK Singles Chart but debuted and peaked at number 75 on the UK Singles Downloads Chart.)	—	—	—	—		On Sunset
2020	"More"	—	—	—	—	—		On Sunset
2021	"Cosmic Fringes"	— (Note: "Cosmic Fringes" did not enter the UK Singles Chart but debuted and peaked at number 72 on the UK Singles Downloads Chart Top 100.)	—	—	—	—		Fat Pop (Volume 1)
2021	"Glad Times"	—	—	—	—	—		Fat Pop (Volume 1)
2021	"Shades of Blue"	— (Note: "Shades of Blue" did not enter the UK Singles Chart but peaked at number 47 on the UK Singles Downloads Chart Top 100 in its third and final week on the chart.)	—	—	—	—		Fat Pop (Volume 1)
2021	"Cosmic Fringes (Remixes)"	—	—	—	—	—		—N/a
2021	"Going to a Go-Go"	—	—	—	—	—		—N/a
2021	"Glad Times (Soul Steppers)"	—	—	—	—	—		—N/a
2021	"The Meeq vs. Fat Pop"	—	—	—	—	—		—N/a
2022	"Ooh Do U Fink U R" (with Suggs)	—	—	—	—	—		—N/a
2022	"Whoosh"	— (Note: "Whoosh" did not enter the UK Singles Chart but debuted and peaked at number 99 on the UK Singles Downloads Chart Top 100.)	—	—	—	—		—N/a
2023	"Ooh Do U Fink U R" (reissue) (with Suggs)	—	—	—	—	—		Record Store Day non-album release
2024	"Soul Wandering"	— (Note: "Soul Wandering" did not enter the UK Singles Chart but debuted at number 85 on the UK Singles Downloads Chart Top 100.)	—	—	—	—		66
2025	"Lawdy Rolla"							Find El Dorado

== Videos and DVDs ==
- Live at the Brixton Academy (1991)
- Highlights & Hang Ups (1993)
- Live Wood (1994)
- Live at the Royal Albert Hall (2000)
- Paul Weller Live: Two Classic Performances (Live in Hyde Park / Later...with Jools Holland) (2002)
- Live at Braehead (2003)
- Modern Classics on Film: 1990–2001 (2004)
- Studio 150 (2004)
- As is Now (2005)
- Hit Parade (2006)
- Into Tomorrow (2007)
- Weller at the BBC (2008)
- Just a Dream: "22 Dreams" Live (2009)
- Find the Torch, Burn the Plans (2011)

== Other appearances ==
Year	Song	Artist(s)	Album
1996	"The Coming of Grace"	The Blow Monkeys	Realms of Gold
1996	"Circular Quay"	The Blow Monkeys	Realms of Gold
1996	"Have no Roots"	The Blow Monkeys	Realms of Gold
1998	"Party Hellfire"	Dr John	Anutha Zone
1998	"I Don't Wanna Know"	Dr John	Anutha Zone
2002	"Will It Go Round in Circles"	Jools Holland	Jools Holland's Big Band Rhythm & Blues
2002	"Brother to Brother"	Terry Callier	Speak Your Peace
2002	"Instant Karma"		Uncut Presents: Instant Karma 2002; a Tribute to John Lennon
2002	"I'll Walk Right On"	Noonday Underground	Surface Noise
2002	"So You Say You Lost Your Baby"	Death in Vegas	Scorpio Rising
2003	"Lullaloop"	Robert Wyatt	Cuckooland
2004	"Under My Wing"	John Martyn	On the Cobbles
2007	"Wishing on a Star"		Sounds Eclectic: The Covers Project
2007	"For Dancers Only"	Ocean Colour Scene	On the Leyline
2007	"Why"	Gabrielle	Always
2007	"Just as You Are"	Robert Wyatt	Comicopera
2009	"The Butterfly Collector"		The Dreams We Have as Children – Live at the Royal Albert Hall
2009	"All You Need Is Love"		The Dreams We Have as Children – Live at the Royal Albert Hall
2010	"Love Love"	Amy MacDonald	A Curious Thing
2010	"This Pretty Face"	Amy MacDonald	A Curious Thing
2012	"Don't Go To Strangers (from the Hootenanny 2006)"	Jools Holland	The Golden Age Of Song
2012	"September in the Rain"	Jools Holland	The Golden Age Of Song
2012	"Sun Grazers"	Kate Rusby	20
2013	"You're Gonna Get It"	Miles Kane	Don't Forget Who You Are
2014	"Let Me In"	Olly Murs	Never Been Better
2017	"Wild Wood"	Africa Express	Africa Express Presents The Orchestra of Syrian Musicians & Guests
2017	"Blackbird"	Africa Express	Africa Express Presents The Orchestra of Syrian Musicians & Guests
2017	"Back in the Game"	Stone Foundation	Street Rituals
2017	"Street Rituals"	Stone Foundation	Street Rituals
2017	"Your Balloon Is Rising"	Stone Foundation	Street Rituals
2017	"Spinning Out"	The Charlatans	Different Days
2020	"Deeper Love"	Stone Foundation	Is Love Enough?
2021	"Shame Shame Shame"	Ronnie Wood	Mr Luck – A Tribute to Jimmy Reed: Live at the Royal Albert Hall
2022	"A Thousand Doors"	Sundowners	Pulling Back the Night
2022	"Night Watcher"	Sundowners	Pulling Back the Night
2022	"Rise Up Singing!"	Monks Road Social	Rise Up Singing!
