= Modern Classics: The Greatest Hits =

Compilation album by Paul Weller
- Released: 15 December 1998
- Genre: Rock
- Length: 54:54
- Label: Go! Discs
- Producer: Paul Weller

Paul Weller chronology
Heavy Soul (1997)	Modern Classics: The Greatest Hits (1998)	Heliocentric (2000)

Professional ratings
Review scores
Source	Rating
Allmusic	4/5 stars

Modern Classics: The Greatest Hits is a compilation album of music by English singer-songwriter Paul Weller, originally released in 1998. It featured most of his solo singles up to that point as well as a new track "Brand New Start".

== Track listing ==
All titles written by Paul Weller except where noted

1. "Out of the Sinking" from Stanley Road
2. "Peacock Suit" from Heavy Soul
3. "Sunflower" from Wild Wood
4. "The Weaver" from Wild Wood
5. "Wild Wood" from Wild Wood
6. "Above the Clouds" from Paul Weller
7. "Uh Huh Oh Yeh" from Paul Weller
8. "Brushed" (Paul Weller, Steve White, Mark Nelson, Brendan Lynch) from Heavy Soul
9. "The Changingman" (Weller, Lynch) from Stanley Road
10. "Friday Street" from Heavy Soul
11. "You Do Something to Me" from Stanley Road
12. "Brand New Start" Single release only
13. "Hung Up" from Wild Wood
14. "Mermaids" from Heavy Soul
15. "Broken Stones" from Stanley Road
16. "Into Tomorrow" from Paul Weller

A limited edition of the album came with a bonus 13 track live disc recorded at Victoria Park, London on 8 August 1998.

1. "Into Tomorrow"
2. "Peacock Suit"
3. "Friday Street"
4. "Mermaids"
5. "Out of the Sinking"
6. "Heavy Soul"
7. "Wild Wood"
8. "Up in Suzes' Room"
9. "(Can You Heal Us) Holy Man?"
10. "The Changingman" (Weller, Lynch)
11. "Porcelain gods"
12. "Sunflower"
13. "Broken Stones"

the above live tracks have since been released as part the Weller at the BBC Digital Box edition.
