= Hit Parade (Paul Weller album) =

Compilation album by Paul Weller
- Released: 6 November 2006
- Genre: Mod revival
- Length: 79:44 (Single disc)
- Label: Island Records

Paul Weller chronology
Catch-Flame! (2006)	Hit Parade (2006)	Wild Wood - Deluxe Edition (2007)

Professional ratings
Review scores
Source	Rating
AllMusic	4.5/5 stars
The Guardian	4/5 stars
MusicOMH	5/5 stars
Pitchfork Media	(7.5/10)
Uncut	3/5 stars

Hit Parade is a 2006 compilation album by Paul Weller, featuring tracks from his solo career and his earlier bands the Jam and the Style Council. The collection was available as a single CD, a 4-CD box set and a 2-DVD set.

== Track listing ==
=== CD ===
1. The Jam – "Town Called Malice" - 2:54
2. The Jam – "Going Underground" - 2:56
3. The Style Council – "Shout to the Top!" - 4:14
4. Paul Weller – "From the Floorboards Up" - 2:29
5. The Jam – "Down in the Tube Station at Midnight" - 4:01
6. Paul Weller – "Peacock Suit" - 3:07
7. Paul Weller – "The Changingman" - 3:33
8. The Jam – "The Eton Rifles" - 3:28
9. Paul Weller – "Come On/Let's Go!" - 3:18
10. Paul Weller – "Sunflower" - 4:10
11. The Jam – "Beat Surrender" - 3:28
12. The Style Council – "Walls Come Tumbling Down!" - 3:25
13. The Jam – "That's Entertainment" - 3:16
14. Paul Weller – "Broken Stones" - 3:22
15. Paul Weller – "Out of the Sinking" 3:51
16. The Style Council – "Long Hot Summer" - 3:48
17. The Style Council – "You're the Best Thing" - 4:24
18. Paul Weller – "Wild Wood" - 3:24
19. Paul Weller – "You Do Something To Me" - 3:38
20. Paul Weller – "Hung Up" - 2:41
21. The Style Council – "My Ever Changing Moods" - 4:02
22. The Style Council – "Speak Like a Child" - 3:14
23. The Jam – "Start!" - 2:17

=== 4-CD box set ===
Disc 1 – The Jam

1. "In the City"
2. "All Around the World"
3. "The Modern World"
4. "News of the World"
5. "David Watts"
6. "A Bomb in Wardour Street"
7. "Down in the Tube Station at Midnight"
8. "Strange Town"
9. "When You're Young"
10. "The Eton Rifles"
11. "Going Underground"
12. "Dreams of Children"
13. "Start!"
14. "That's Entertainment"
15. "Funeral Pyre"
16. "Absolute Beginners"
17. "Town Called Malice"
18. "Precious"
19. "Just Who is the 5 O'Clock Hero?"
20. "The Bitterest Pill (I Ever Had to Swallow)"
21. "Beat Surrender"

Disc 2 – The Style Council

1. "Speak Like a Child"
2. "Money Go Round"
3. "Long Hot Summer"
4. "Solid Bond in Your Heart"
5. "My Ever Changing Moods"
6. "You're the Best Thing"
7. "Big Boss Groove"
8. "Shout to the Top!"
9. "Walls Come Tumbling Down"
10. "Come to Milton Keynes"
11. "The Lodgers"
12. "Have You Ever Had It Blue"
13. "It Didn't Matter"
14. "Waiting"
15. "Wanted"
16. "Life at a Top People's Health Farm"
17. "How She Threw It All Away"
18. "Promised Land"

Disc 3 – Paul Weller

1. "Into Tomorrow"
2. "Uh-Huh Oh-Yeh"
3. "Above the Clouds"
4. "Sunflower"
5. "Wild Wood"
6. "The Weaver"
7. "Hung Up"
8. "Out of the Sinking"
9. "The Changingman"
10. "You Do Something To Me"
11. "Broken Stones"
12. "Peacock Suit"
13. "Brushed"
14. "Friday Street"
15. "Mermaids"

Disc 4 – Paul Weller

1. "Brand New Start"
2. "He's the Keeper"
3. "Sweet Pea, My Sweet Pea"
4. "It's Written in the Stars"
5. "Leafy Mysteries"
6. "The Bottle"
7. "Wishing on a Star"
8. "Thinking of You"
9. "Early Morning Rain"
10. "From the Floorboards Up"
11. "Come On/Let's Go!"
12. "Here's the Good News"
13. "Blink & You'll Miss It"

== Charts ==
=== Weekly charts ===
Chart (2006)	Peak position
Irish Albums (IRMA)	28
Scottish Albums (OCC)	7
UK Albums (OCC)	7

=== Year-end charts ===
Chart (2006)	Position
UK Albums (OCC)	53
Chart (2007)	Position
UK Albums (OCC)	187

== Certifications ==
Region	Certification	Certified units/sales
United Kingdom (BPI)	2× Platinum	600,000^{^}
^{^} Shipments figures based on certification alone.
