= Live at the Royal Albert Hall (Paul Weller album) =

Live album by Paul Weller
- Released: 19 May 2008
- Recorded: 16–17 May 2000
- Genre: Rock
- Label: Warner Bros.

Paul Weller chronology
Wild Wood - Deluxe Edition (2007)	Live at the Royal Albert Hall (2008)	22 Dreams (2008)

Live at the Royal Albert Hall is a live album by Paul Weller. The concert was first released on DVD on 27 November 2000, and this live album is the audio of that concert. The track listing for the album runs in a different order to the DVD. The original DVD was also packaged with the album. The album reached #140 in the UK album chart.

== Track listing ==
Disc 1 – DVD-Video

1. Peacock Suit
2. Friday Street
3. He's the Keeper
4. Back in the Fire
5. Dust and Rocks
6. Out of the Sinking
7. Heavy Soul
8. Time and Temperance
9. Frightened
10. You Do Something to Me
11. The Changingman
12. Porcelain Gods
13. There's No Drinking After You're Dead
14. As You Lean into the Light
15. Broken Stones
16. Picking Up Sticks
17. Loveless
18. Woodcutter's Son

Disc 2 – CD

1. The Changingman
2. Porcelain Gods
3. You Do Something to Me
4. Peacock Suit
5. Out of the Sinking
6. Friday Street
7. Broken Stones
8. Back in the Fire
9. Loveless
10. Heavy Soul
11. Picking Up Sticks
12. There's No Drinking After You're Dead
13. He's the Keeper
14. As You Lean into the Light
15. Dust and Rocks
16. Woodcutter's Son
17. Frightened
18. Time and Temperance
