= Brit Awards 2006 =

British music awards ceremony

- Date: 14 February 2006
- Venue: Earls Court
- Hosted by: Chris Evans

Highlights
- Most awards: Kaiser Chiefs (3)
- Most nominations: James Blunt and Kaiser Chiefs (5)

Television/radio coverage
- Network: ITV

Brit Awards 2006 was the 26th show of the Brit Awards. It was organised by the British Phonographic Industry and took place on February 14, 2006 in Earls Court in London.

The ceremony was hosted by Chris Evans, who also hosted Brit Awards 2005. It lasted about three hours, and the alcohol ban of the previous year had been relaxed. The biggest surprise performance was that from Prince, who reunited with Wendy and Lisa from The Revolution, together with Sheila E. for the performance.

2006's biggest winners were the Kaiser Chiefs, who came away with three awards. Coldplay, James Blunt and Green Day all came away with two awards, Coldplay collecting their sixth overall. Other winners included the Arctic Monkeys for their only nomination, and acts such as KT Tunstall and Kanye West. Arcade Fire were the most unsuccessful act, being nominated for three awards but winning none of them.

== Performances ==
Artist(s)	Song(s)	UK Singles Chart reaction (week ending 25 February 2006)	UK Albums Chart reaction (week ending 25 February 2006)
Coldplay	"Square One"		X&Y – 8 (+13)
KT Tunstall	"Suddenly I See"	63 (+18)	Eye to the Telescope – 4 (+15)
Kaiser Chiefs	"I Predict a Riot"	28 (+16)	Employment – 2 (+5)
James Blunt	"You're Beautiful"	31 (+20)	Back to Bedlam – 3 (-1)
Kanye West	"Diamonds from Sierra Leone" "Gold Digger" "Touch the Sky"		Late Registration – 23 (+17)
Kelly Clarkson	"Since U Been Gone"	66 (-3)	Breakaway – 9 (-4); Thankful – 87 (-3)
Gorillaz	"Dirty Harry"		Demon Days – 7 (+9)
Jack Johnson	"Better Together"		In Between Dreams – 6 (+9); On and On – 63 (+6)
Paul Weller	"Come On/Let's Go" "The Changingman" "From the Floorboards Up" "Town Called Malice"		Modern Classics: The Greatest Hits – 32 (+32); As Is Now – 38 (+42); Stanley Road – 96 (re-entry); Studio 150 – 99 (re-entry)
Prince	"Te Amo Corazón" "Fury" "Purple Rain" "Let's Go Crazy"		

== Winners and nominees ==
British Album of the Year (presented by Madonna)	British Single of the Year (presented by Morten Harket)
Coldplay – X&Y; Gorillaz – Demon Days; James Blunt – Back to Bedlam; Kaiser Chiefs – Employment; Kate Bush – Aerial	Coldplay – "Speed of Sound"; James Blunt – "You're Beautiful"; Shayne Ward – "That's My Goal"; Sugababes – "Push the Button"; Tony Christie (featuring Peter Kay) – "(Is This the Way to) Amarillo"
British Male Solo Artist (presented by Wayne Coyne)	British Female Solo Artist (presented by Jo Whiley)
James Blunt; Antony and the Johnsons; Ian Brown; Robbie Williams; Will Young	KT Tunstall; Charlotte Church; Kate Bush; Katie Melua; Natasha Bedingfield
British Group (presented by Debbie Harry)	British Breakthrough Act (presented by Chris O'Dowd)
Kaiser Chiefs; Coldplay; Franz Ferdinand; Gorillaz; Hard-Fi	Arctic Monkeys; James Blunt; Kaiser Chiefs; KT Tunstall; The Magic Numbers
British Pop Act (presented by Harry Hill)	British Urban Act (presented by Jamelia)
James Blunt; Katie Melua; Kelly Clarkson (United States); Madonna (United States); Westlife (Ireland)	Lemar; Craig David; Dizzee Rascal; Ms. Dynamite; Kano
British Rock Act (presented by Tamsin Greig)	British Live Act (presented by Thandie Newton)
Kaiser Chiefs; Franz Ferdinand; Hard-Fi; Kasabian; Oasis	Kaiser Chiefs; Coldplay; Franz Ferdinand; KT Tunstall; Oasis
Outstanding Contribution to Music (presented by Ray Winstone)	International Album (presented by Paris Hilton)
Paul Weller	Green Day – American Idiot; Arcade Fire – Funeral; Kanye West – Late Registration; Madonna – Confessions on a Dance Floor; U2 – How to Dismantle an Atomic Bomb
International Male Solo Artist (presented by Boy George)	International Female Solo Artist (presented by Neil Tennant)
Kanye West; Beck; Bruce Springsteen; Jack Johnson; John Legend	Madonna; Björk; Kelly Clarkson; Mariah Carey; Missy Elliott
International Group (presented by Kelly Osbourne)	International Breakthrough Act (presented by Beth Orton)
Green Day; Arcade Fire; The Black Eyed Peas; U2; The White Stripes	Jack Johnson; Arcade Fire; Daniel Powter; John Legend; The Pussycat Dolls

== Multiple nominations and awards ==
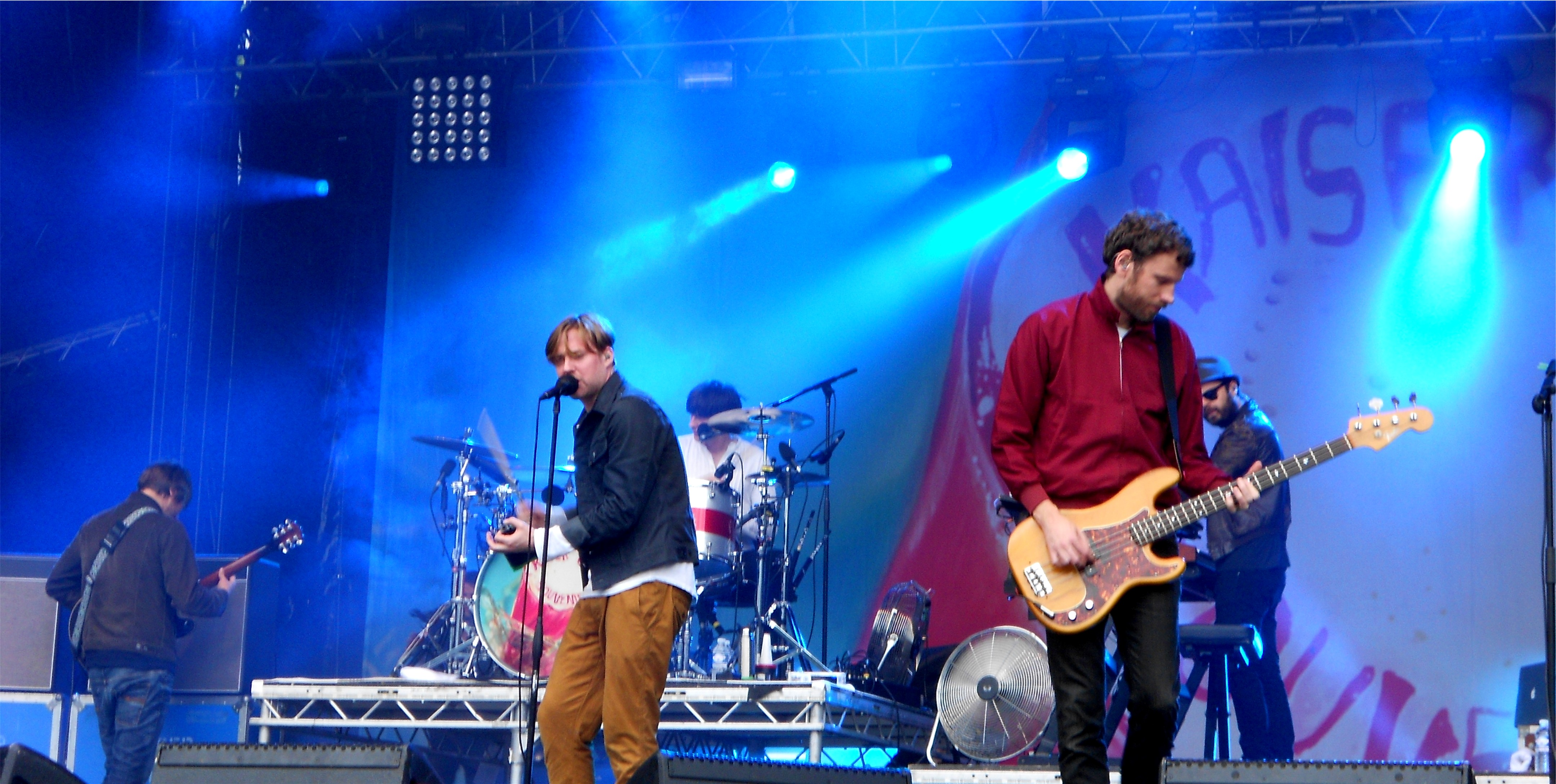
Three-time winner Kaiser Chiefs as most nominations and awards

Artists that received multiple nominations
Nominations	Artist
5 (2)	James Blunt
5 (2)	Kaiser Chiefs
4	Coldplay
3 (4)	Arcade Fire
3 (4)	Franz Ferdinand
3 (4)	KT Tunstall
3 (4)	Madonna
2 (11)	Gorillaz
2 (11)	Green Day
2 (11)	Hard-Fi
2 (11)	Jack Johnson
2 (11)	John Legend
2 (11)	Kanye West
2 (11)	Kate Bush
2 (11)	Katie Melua
2 (11)	Kelly Clarkson
2 (11)	Oasis
2 (11)	U2

Artists that received multiple awards
Awards	Artist
3	Kaiser Chiefs
2 (3)	Coldplay
2 (3)	Green Day
2 (3)	James Blunt

== Controversy ==
- Some of the more famous British pop acts failed to get a nomination. Bands like Girls Aloud and McFly both had top 10 hits in both the single and album charts but neither were nominated, and Oasis who were eligible, but were snubbed in the category of Best Album, only had 2 nominations.

== See also ==
- Naomi Awards
