= Steve White (drummer) =

English drummer (born 1965)

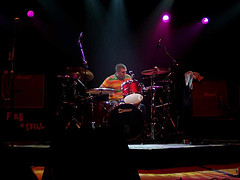
- White performing in 2007

Background information
- Born: Steven Douglas White; 31 May 1965 (age 61); Southwark, London, England
- Genres: Rock; pop; jazz
- Instrument: Drums
- Years active: 1981–present
- Spouse: Sally Lindsay (m. 2013)
- Website: whiteydrums.com

Steven Douglas White (born 31 May 1965) is an English drummer who has worked extensively with Paul Weller and the Style Council among others. His brother, Alan White, is also a drummer, who played for Oasis for nine years (1995–2004).

== Musical career ==
White was given a small drum as a child by his uncle and upon joining his local Boys' Brigade he began to learn his craft. As with White's bandmate Paul Weller, he was given full support from his parents who went out of their way to help their son develop. White spent his youth having lessons from the late George Scott of Wanstead and learning from recordings of Buddy Rich and Louie Bellson. White later took lessons with drumming teacher Bob Armstrong at Bob's Masterclass studio, then in Hornchurch, Essex. White complemented his work gigging with local bands with part-time work, spending any spare cash on updating his collection of jazz records.

In 1983, White auditioned for an unnamed band which turned out to be Paul Weller's new group, the Style Council. Weller was impressed with the 17-year-old drummer's jazz background and asked White to come back the following day. White stayed with the band for some years but was never actually invited to join, even though he appeared in most of their videos and on all but a few recordings. He became the youngest drummer on stage at Live Aid at Wembley Stadium in 1985. He also performed at Live 8 with the Who at Hyde Park in 2005, when their regular drummer, Zak Starkey, had left to join Oasis on their tours and recording sessions.

White left the Style Council in 1989 to pursue other projects and went on to play with many well known acts, such as Ian Dury, the James Taylor Quartet, the Redskins and the Jazz Renegades. When the Style Council reformed for a one-off gig for Japanese TV in 1990, Paul Weller invited White to his studio to hear a few demo tracks. White was soon back full-time behind the kit for Weller's solo projects.

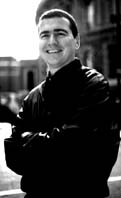
White in 2004

White became a member of the group named the Players with ex-Style Council keyboardist Mick Talbot and ex-Ocean Colour Scene bassist Damon Minchella. He also played in Trio Valore with Damon Minchella and Seamus Beaghan. He has played with Jon Lord, and on the last La Roux album. Alongside Damon Minchella and Matt Deighton, White plays in The Family Silver, which released an album on Privilege records in 2015.

White plays Yamaha drums, Zildjian cymbals, Vic Firth sticks, Remo drum heads, and endorses Porter and Davis monitoring products and Keo percussion products.

White formerly managed artist Sam Gray and teaches for both Trinity Laban Conservatoire in Greenwich and Goldsmiths in New Cross. White played drums on two releases by the UK group the Family Silver featuring Matt Deighton and Damon Minchella, he is currently drumming for Sheffield-based band Hague and White and recording and teaching from his base in Hextable Kent. In 2018 White presented and consulted on Sky Arts' series 'The Art of Drumming,' which won in the Documentary category at the 2019 Royal Television Society Awards.

== Personal life ==
White's first marriage was to Hayley Marsh, with whom he had two children. In 2013, he married former Coronation Street actress Sally Lindsay. The couple have twin boys.

White is a supporter of Charlton Athletic F.C. He is the older brother of the former Oasis drummer Alan White.

== Discography ==
=== With James Taylor Quartet ===
==== Albums ====
- Get Organized (1989)

=== With Paul Weller ===
==== Albums ====
- Paul Weller (1992) – No. 8 UK
- Wild Wood (1993) – No. 2 UK
- Live Wood (1994) – No. 13 UK
- Stanley Road (1995) – No. 1 UK
- Heavy Soul (1997) – No. 2 UK
- Modern Classics – The Greatest Hits (1998) – No. 7 UK
- Heliocentric (2000) – No. 2 UK
- Days of Speed (2001) – No. 3 UK
- Illumination (2002) – No. 1 UK
- Fly on the Wall: B Sides & Rarities (2003) – No. 22 UK
- Studio 150 (2004) – No. 2 UK
- Stanley Road (10th Anniversary Edition) (2005) – No. 51 UK
- As Is Now (2005) – No. 4 UK
- Catch-Flame! (2006)

=== With the Style Council ===
==== Albums ====
- Café Bleu (1984) – UK No. 2
- Our Favourite Shop (1985) – UK No. 1 (Internationalists in US)
- Home and Abroad (1986)
- Cost of Loving (1987) – UK No. 2
- Confessions of a Pop Group (1988) – UK No. 14
- Modernism: A New Decade (1989)

=== With The Players ===
- Clear the Decks (2003)
- From the Six Corners (2005)

=== With Trio Valore ===
- Return of the Iron Monkey (2008)

Liars and cheater EP

=== Sample CD ===
- On The Beaten Track

=== With The Family Silver ===
- Electric Blend (2015)
- Hague and White - the Eleventh hour.
