= Live Wood =

Live album by Paul Weller
- Released: 9 September 1994
- Genre: Rock
- Length: 63:54
- Label: Go! Discs
- Producer: Paul Weller

Paul Weller chronology
Wild Wood (1993)	Live Wood (1994)	Stanley Road (1995)

Professional ratings
Review scores
Source	Rating
AllMusic	link
NME	8/10
Select	3/5 medals

Live Wood, released in 1994 was Paul Weller's first solo live album, comprising a collection of high energy and melodic numbers selected from his 1993/1994 tour. Songs were chosen from a number of the concerts, including the Royal Albert Hall, London (22 November 1993 - incorrectly listed as December), Wolverhampton Civic Hall (9 March 1994), the Paradiso in Amsterdam (16 April 1994) and La Luna, Brussels (17 April 1994).

The album mixes songs from Weller's eponymous debut studio album and its follow up, Wild Wood, along with snatches of covers (The Who's "Magic Bus", Donald Byrd's "Dominoes" and Edwin Starr's "War"). The only song featured on neither album is "This Is No Time", which originally appeared as the B-side of single "The Weaver". Upon its release, Live Wood reached #13 in the UK album chart.

== Track listing ==
No.	Title	Length
1.	"Bull Rush / Magic Bus" (Royal Albert Hall, 22.11.93)	5:41
2.	"This Is No Time" (Royal Albert Hall, 22,11,93)	6:04
3.	"All the Pictures on the Wall" (Royal Albert Hall, 22,11,93)	3:59
4.	"Remember How We Started / Dominoes" (Wolverhampton Civic Hall, 9.3.94)	3:58
5.	"Above The Clouds" (Wolverhampton Civic Hall, 9.3.94)	3:55
6.	"Wild Wood" (Wolverhampton Civic Hall, 9.3.94)	3:40
7.	"Shadow of the Sun" (Paradiso, 16.4.94)	10:22
8.	"(Can You Heal Us) Holy Man? / War" (Wolverhampton Civic Hall, 9.3.94)	4:34
9.	"5th Season" (Royal Albert Hall, 22.11.93)	4:51
10.	"Into Tomorrow" (La Luna, 17.4.94)	3:07
11.	"Foot of the Mountain" (Royal Albert Hall, 22.11.93)	6:04
12.	"Sunflower" (Paradiso, 16.4.94)	3:55
13.	"Has My Fire Really Gone Out?" (Paradiso, 16.4.94)	3:51

== Personnel ==
- Paul Weller – vocals, guitar, piano
- Steve "Supe" White – drums
- Yolanda Charles – bass
- Helen Turner – keyboards
- Steve Cradock – guitar
- Clive Sparkman – keyboards
- Dodge Aspinell – drums
- David Liddle – guitar
