= Hung Up (Paul Weller song) =

Single by Paul Weller

from the album Wild Wood
- Released: 28 March 1994
- Length: 2:42
- Label: Go! Discs
- Songwriter: Paul Weller
- Producers: Paul Weller; Brendan Lynch

Paul Weller singles chronology
"Wild Wood" (1993)	"Hung Up" (1994)	"Out of the Sinking" (1994)

Music video
- "Hung Up" on YouTube

"Hung Up" is a song by British singer-songwriter Paul Weller, released in March 1994 by Go! Discs as the fourth single from his second album, Wild Wood (1993). The song was written by Weller and co-produced by him with Brendan Lynch. It reached number 11 on the UK Singles Chart in April 1994, making it Weller's highest-charting solo single at the time. The single was re-released as a track on Modern Classics: The Greatest Hits in 1998.

== Lyrical content ==
The song is written from the viewpoint of an old man refusing to admit defeat. The lyrics begin "Hidden in the back seat of my head / Some place, I can't remember where."

== Critical reception ==
Alan Jones from Music Week gave the song three out of five, writing, "A brand new single from Weller, whose Wild Wood album won much critical acclaim. However, 'Hung Up' is not exactly a groundbreaker, and while it is well played and sung, with nicely strummed acoustic guitar, it's life will be short."

== Music video ==
The accompanying music video for "Hung Up" was directed by Pedro Romhanyi and produced by Steven Elliott for Oil Factory. It was released on 28 March 1994 and features a low-key performance from Weller in and around the Manor recording studio. Romhanyi had previously directed the video for "Sunflower" and "Wild Wood".

== Charts ==
Chart (1994)	Peak position
UK Singles (OCC)	11
