= The As Is Now EP =

EP by Paul Weller
- Released: 13 February 2006
- Recorded: 2005
- Genre: Rock
- Label: V2
- Producer: Paul Weller and Jan "Stan" Kybert

The As Is Now EP is a limited-edition single by Paul Weller released in 2006. The EP was released to coincide with his 2006 Brit Award for Outstanding Contribution to Music.

== Track listing ==
The track listing of the EP consisted of Blink and You'll Miss It, a track from his latest studio album at the time As Is Now, and the three other single from the same album

1. Blink & You'll Miss It
2. From The Floorboards Up
3. Here's The Good News
4. Come On / Let's Go
