= Friday Street (disambiguation) =

Friday Street is a hamlet in Surrey, England.

Friday Street may also refer to:

- Friday Street, London, a road in the City of London
- "Friday Street", a 1997 song by Paul Weller
