= The Changing Man =

The Changing Man may refer to:

- "The Changingman", a song by Paul Weller from the Stanley Road album
- Shade, the Changing Man, a fictional comic book character
- Changing Man, a 2011 album by Jaap Reesema
