= Just a Dream: 22 Dreams Live =

Just a Dream - 22 Dreams Live

Live album by Paul Weller
- Released: 8 June 2009
- Recorded: 2008
- Genre: Rock, Indie
- Label: Universal Records
- Producer: Various

Paul Weller chronology
Weller at the BBC (2008)	Just a Dream - 22 Dreams Live (2009)	Paul Weller - Deluxe Edition (2009)

Just a Dream – 22 Dreams Live is a 2009 live DVD and CD by Paul Weller.

The DVD features a full 90 minute live session recorded for the BBC that was first televised in December 2008. The 21 tracks features a lot of songs from Paul's most recent studio album 22 Dreams and also includes older classics and some of Weller favourites.

The DVD also features a 5-track session recorded for Channel 4, along with the videos for "Have You Made Up Your Mind" and "Echoes Round The Sun" plus an exclusive end-of-2008 interview with Paul and the band.

The live CD was recorded at Brixton Academy in November 2008.

== Track listing ==
=== DVD-Video ===
1. "Peacock Suit"
2. "22 Dreams"
3. "All I Wanna Do"
4. "From the Floorboards Up"
5. "All On a Misty Morning"
6. "Brand New Start"
7. "Have You Made Up Your Mind"
8. "Wild Blue Yonder"
9. "Black River"
10. "Invisible"
11. "One Bright Star"
12. "Where'er You Go"
13. "Wild Wood"
14. "Why Walk When You Can Run"
15. "Butterfly Collector"
16. "Seaspray"
17. "Echoes Round the Sun"
18. "Changing Man"
19. "Eton Rifles"
20. "Push It Along"
21. "Whirlpool's End"

=== CD ===
1. "From the Floorboards Up"
2. "Have You Made Up Your Mind"
3. "Broken Stones"
4. "Porcelain Gods"
5. "Shout to the Top"
6. "Come On, Let’s Go"
7. "Echoes Round the Sun"
8. "Wishing On a Star"
9. "You Do Something to Me"
10. "Invisible"
11. "Seaspray"
12. "Push It Along"
13. "Eton Rifles"
