= Peacock Suit =

1996 single by Paul Weller

Single by Paul Weller

from the album Heavy Soul
- B-side: "Eye of the Storm"
- Released: 5 August 1996
- Genre: Garage rock
- Length: 3:08
- Label: Go! Discs
- Songwriter: Paul Weller
- Producers: Brendan Lynch, Paul Weller

Paul Weller singles chronology
"Out of the Sinking" (1996)	"Peacock Suit" (1996)	"Brushed" (1997)

Peacock Suit is a song by English singer-songwriter Paul Weller that was released on 5 August 1996 as the first single from his fourth solo album, Heavy Soul. It reached No. 5 on the UK Singles Chart in August 1996, making it the highest-charting single of his solo career.

Uncut magazine praised the song as a "snarling update of The Who's 'I'm The Face'", rating it 25th on its list of Weller's 30 best songs. Weller wrote the song in response to a newspaper article which criticised the Mod clothing movement.

== Track listings ==
UK 7-inch, CD, and cassette single

1. "Peacock Suit"
2. "Eye of the Storm"

European CD EP

1. "Peacock Suit"
2. "Eye of the Storm"
3. "I Shall Be Released"
4. "Into Tomorrow"
5. "Sunflower"
6. "You Do Something to Me"

== Charts ==
Chart (1996)	Peak position
Australia (ARIA)	164
Europe (Eurochart Hot 100)	27
Scotland Singles (OCC)	6
UK Singles (OCC)	5
