= Heliocentric (Paul Weller album) =

Studio album by Paul Weller
- Released: 10 April 2000 (UK); 9 May 2000 (US)
- Studio: Heliocentric Studios & Black Barn Studios
- Genre: Rock
- Length: 48:05
- Label: Island
- Producer: Paul Weller; Brendan Lynch

Paul Weller chronology
Modern Classics: The Greatest Hits (1998)	Heliocentric (2000)	Days of Speed (2001)

Professional ratings
Review scores
Source	Rating
AllMusic	4.5/5 stars
The Encyclopedia of Popular Music	2/5 stars
NME	3.5/5 stars
Q	4/5 stars

Heliocentric is the fifth studio album by the English singer-songwriter Paul Weller, released in 2000.

It peaked at No. 2 on the UK Albums chart.

== Production ==
Heliocentric was produced by Brendan Lynch. Its name was inspired by the Helios desk used in the recording studio.

The string arrangements were contributed by Robert Kirby.

== Critical reception ==
Exclaim! wrote: "Infuriatingly, relentlessly dull, [the album] suggests that Weller is not only dry of opinions and melodies, but disengaged from the very concept of fresh ideas." The Guardian called the album "a mustering of forces, as if [Weller]'s suddenly realised that coasting on his reputation as Mr Authentically Gritty won't keep those automatic Brit awards coming in." The New Zealand Herald called it "a solid, often dense, and musicianly collection that in its acoustic-framed songs echoes Wildwood."

== Track listing ==
The original album cover has a printing mistake which shows tracks 4 & 5 in the wrong order. The correct order is shown below.

All tracks composed by Paul Weller

1. "He's the Keeper"
2. "Frightened"
3. "Sweet Pea, My Sweet Pea"
4. "A Whale's Tale"
5. "Back in the Fire"
6. "Dust and Rocks"
7. "There's No Drinking, After You're Dead"
8. "With Time & Temperance"
9. "Picking Up Sticks"
10. "Love-Less"

== Personnel ==
- Paul Weller – vocals, guitar, piano
- Cliff Stapleton – hurdy-gurdy
- Steve Cradock – guitar
- Dominic Kelly – oboe
- Brendan Lynch – keyboards, percussion
- Steve White – drums
- Damon Minchella – bass
- Robert Kirby – string arrangements
