= Stanley Road =

Studio album by Paul Weller
- Released: 15 May 1995
- Studio: The Manor Studios (Oxfordshire)
- Length: 52:10
- Label: Go! Discs
- Producers: Paul Weller; Brendan Lynch

Paul Weller chronology
Live Wood (1994)	Stanley Road (1995)	Heavy Soul (1997)

Paul Weller chronology
Studio 150 (2004)	Stanley Road (10th Anniversary Edition) (2005)	As Is Now (2005)

Singles from Stanley Road
- 1. "Out of the Sinking" Released: 1994; 2. "The Changingman" Released: April 1995; 3. "You Do Something to Me" Released: July 1995; 4. "Broken Stones" Released: September 1995

10th anniversary edition cover

Stanley Road is the third solo studio album by the English singer-songwriter and musician Paul Weller, released on 15 May 1995 by Go! Discs. The album took its name from the street in Woking where Weller grew up. Weller's cover version of the song "I Walk on Guilded Splinters" was featured in the series ending montage of The Wire's fourth series end, "Final Grades".

On 30 May 2005, a three-disc 10th anniversary deluxe edition of the album was released by Island Records. The expanded edition included demos, live and BBC session recordings and a DVD documentary directed by Simon Halfon which featured interviews, behind-the-scenes footage and music videos.

== Artwork ==
The album's cover collage was created by the artist Peter Blake, co-designer of The Beatles' Sgt Pepper's album artwork (album package design for Weller was supervised by his long-term associate Simon Halfon).

== Collaborations ==
The album features contributions from several notable collaborators, including Noel Gallagher (then of Oasis), who appears playing acoustic guitar on "I Walk on Gilded Splinters", and Steve Winwood (formerly of the Spencer Davis Group and Traffic), who performs on the songs "Woodcutter's Son" and "Pink on White Walls". Weller is also joined by long-time collaborators Steve Cradock (co-founder of Ocean Colour Scene) and Steve White (the Style Council).

The album was co-produced by Brendan Lynch, who had also worked on Weller's previous two solo albums, Paul Weller and Wild Wood.

== Critical reception ==
Professional ratings
Initial reviews (in 1995)
Review scores
Source	Rating
Entertainment Weekly	A−
The Guardian	3/5 stars
NME	6/10
Rolling Stone	3/5 stars
Smash Hits	1/5 marks
The Sydney Morning Herald	2.5/5 stars

Professional ratings
Retrospective reviews (after 1995)
Review scores
Source	Rating
AllMusic	3.5/5 stars
Encyclopedia of Popular Music	5/5 stars
Record Collector	4/5 stars
Spin	4.5/5 stars
Uncut	4/5 stars

Ted Kessler, in his contemporary, May 1995 review for NME, felt that the album was "doggedly retro and straight ahead" – an "old fart rockin' blues record" in the style of Eric Clapton, though with "just enough edge to keep you tuned".

Evelyn McDonnell, in a July 1995 review for Rolling Stone, noted the collaborations with musicians such as Steve Winwood and Noel Gallagher, commenting that "Weller's work supplies the connecting link between several generations of British rock and soul", and that Weller's session band were able to lay down "some admirably funky grooves". However, she felt that "Weller takes his musical bombast to Springsteenian levels at points. And his attempt to return to populist roots sinks well below Springsteenian levels of banality".

=== Legacy ===
In 1998 Q magazine readers voted it the 46th greatest album of all time. In a retrospective summary for Record Collector in 2008, John Reed commented that "Stanley Road remained the apex of Weller's career in terms of commercial success".

== Track listing ==
All songs written by Paul Weller, except where noted.

Stanley Road track listing
No.	Title	Writer(s)	Length
1.	"The Changingman"	Brendan Lynch, Paul Weller	4:02
2.	"Porcelain Gods"		4:51
3.	"I Walk on Gilded Splinters"	John Creaux (Dr. John)	5:24
4.	"You Do Something to Me"		3:38
5.	"Woodcutter's Son"		4:43
6.	"Time Passes..."		4:56
7.	"Stanley Road"		4:18
8.	"Broken Stones"		3:16
9.	"Out of the Sinking"		3:51
10.	"Pink on White Walls"		2:39
11.	"Whirlpools' End"		7:11
12.	"Wings of Speed"		3:13

10th anniversary edition (Disc 1: Bonus Tracks)
No.	Title	Writer(s)	Length
13.	"Sexy Sadie"	John Lennon, Paul McCartney	2:41
14.	"I'd Rather Go Blind"	Bill Foster, Ellington Jordan	4:09
15.	"It's a New Day, Baby"		2:12
16.	"I Didn't Mean to Hurt You" (Live)		3:51
17.	"My Whole World Is Falling Down" (BBC Radio 1 The Evening Sessions version)	Bettye Crutcher, Booker T. Jones	3:21
18.	"A Year Late"		4:18
19.	"Woodcutter's Son" (BBC Radio 1 The Evening Sessions version)		4:20

10th anniversary edition (Disc 2: B-Sides and Demos)
No.	Title	Writer(s)	Length
1.	"Trident Jam" (Take 3)	Paul Weller, Steve White	1:37
2.	"Pink on White Walls" (Demo 2)		3:25
3.	"Porcelain Gods" (8 track demo)		4:46
4.	"Broken Stones" (Demo 1)		3:06
5.	"Wings of Speed" (8 track demo)		2:42
6.	"The Changingman" (8 track demo)	Brendan Lynch, Paul Weller	4:21
7.	"Everyone Must Have a Purpose"		2:38
8.	"You Do Something to Me" (Demo 3)		3:32
9.	"A Year Late" (Demo 1)		4:11
10.	"Whirlpools' End/Steam" (Alternative version)	Brendan Lynch, Paul Weller	4:00
11.	"Gtr + Moog Jam" (Demo)		1:25
12.	"Corrina, Corrina"	Traditional, arranged by Jesse Ed Davis, Taj Mahal	2:52
13.	"Out on the Weekend"	Neil Young	2:58
14.	"Time Passes..." (Demo 2)		3:21
15.	"Time Passes..." (Demo 3)		3:33
16.	"Wings of Speed" (Demo 2)		3:14
17.	"Stanley Road" (Demo 1)		5:15
18.	"Woodcutter's Son" (8 track demo)		3:48
19.	"Porcelain Gods" (Instrumental)		5:33

10th anniversary edition (Disc 3: Broke 'n' Stoned – Stanley Road Revisited)
No.	Title	Length
1.	"Broke 'n' Stoned"	30:15
2.	"Out of the Sinking"	3:59
3.	"The Changingman"	3:28
4.	"You Do Something to Me"	3:44
5.	"Broken Stones"	3:22

=== Vinyl version ===
All songs written by Paul Weller, except where noted.

Side one
No.	Title	Writer(s)	Length
1.	"The Changingman"	Brendan Lynch, Paul Weller	4:02
2.	"Porcelain Gods"		4:51
3.	"I Walk on Gilded Splinters"	John Creaux	5:24
4.	"You Do Something to Me"		3:38
5.	"Woodcutter's Son"		4:43
6.	"Time Passes..."		4:56

Side two
No.	Title	Length
1.	"Stanley Road"	4:18
2.	"Broken Stones"	3:16
3.	"Out of the Sinking"	3:51
4.	"Pink on White Walls"	2:39
5.	"Whirlpools' End"	7:11
6.	"Wings of Speed"	3:13

== Personnel ==
- Paul Weller – vocals (1–12), guitar (1–7, 9–11), piano (1, 2, 4, 6, 7, 11, 12), percussion (1, 3, 5), Hammond organ (3, 5, 8, 10), Novatron (4), Wurlitzer (8, 9)
- Dr. Robert – bass (1, 2, 6, 11), backing vocals (1, 2)
- Mark Nelson – bass (3, 5, 8, 10)
- Yolanda Charles – bass (4, 7, 9)
- Steve White – drums (1–11), percussion (3, 5)
- Steve Cradock – guitar (1, 2, 6), backing vocals (1, 11), acoustic and electric guitar (11)
- Brendan Lynch – Cyremin (1, 11), Mini-Moog (7), tambourine and accordion (8), finger cymbals (10)
- Carleen Anderson – backing vocals (1, 5, 8), vocals (9, 12)
- Noel Gallagher – acoustic guitar (3)
- Constantine Wier – voodoo vocal (3)
- Helen Turner – Hammond organ (4, 6, 9), Novatron strings (6, 7, 9, 11)
- Steve Winwood – piano (5, 10), Hammond organ and Wurlitzer (5)
- David Liddle – acoustic slide guitar (5)
- Mick Talbot – Fender Rhodes (8), Hammond organ and pipe organ (12)
- Joy Hawley – cello (12)

== Charts ==
Chart performance for Stanley Road
Chart (1995)	Peak position
Australian Albums (ARIA)	65
Dutch Albums (Album Top 100)	18
Swedish Albums (Sverigetopplistan)	37
UK Albums (Official Charts)	1

Chart (2026)	Peak position
Greek Albums (IFPI)	56

== Certifications ==
Sales certifications for Stanley Road
Region	Certification	Certified units/sales
United Kingdom (BPI)	4× Platinum	1,200,000^{^}
^{^} Shipments figures based on certification alone.
