= 22 Dreams =

Studio album by Paul Weller
- Released: 2 June 2008
- Recorded: 2007–2008
- Genres: Indie rock, neo-psychedelia
- Length: 68:45
- Labels: UK, EU Island/UMG, US Yep Roc
- Producers: Paul Weller; Simon Dine; Steve Cradock; Charles Rees

Paul Weller chronology
Live at the Royal Albert Hall (2008)	22 Dreams (2008)	Weller at the BBC (2008)

Professional ratings
Aggregate scores
Source	Rating
Metacritic	77/100
Review scores
Source	Rating
AllMusic	4.5/5 stars
Billboard	(positive)
The Guardian	4/5 stars
The Independent	5/5 stars
Mojo	4/5 stars
The Observer	5/5 stars
Paste	8/10 stars
Pitchfork Media	7.9/10
PopMatters	8/10 stars
The Times	4/5 stars

22 Dreams is the ninth solo studio album by Paul Weller. It was released on 2 June 2008.

The album was released on double LP and single CD, as well as a deluxe edition CD, featuring a bonus CD with outtakes and extra tracks. Oasis stars Noel Gallagher and Gem Archer feature on the album, as does Ocean Colour Scene guitarist Steve Cradock and Blur guitarist Graham Coxon. The song "One Bright Star" features former member of The Jam, Steve Brookes, on Spanish guitar, the first time the childhood friends had worked together since Brookes left the band before they gained a recording contract, more than 30 years before.

The album features Little Barrie and former The Stone Roses member Aziz Ibrahim. The first release from the album was the double a-sided single "Echoes Round the Sun" - featuring Noel Gallagher and Gem Archer from Oasis, and "Have You Made Up Your Mind". It became his first Top 20 single since 2005, peaking at number 19 in the UK Singles Chart.

It received almost unanimous critical acclaim and was featured on many Best of 2008 lists. Critics called it one of Weller's best albums to date.

The album includes "Black River," a song previously used on the b-side to "This Old Town".

It went straight to number 1 on the UK Albums Chart on Sunday, 8 June, making it Weller's third number-one solo album.

== Track listing ==
=== Deluxe Edition CD 1 / Standard Edition ===
All tracks are written by Paul Weller, except where noted.

No.	Title	Writer(s)	Length
1.	"Light Nights"		3:45
2.	"22 Dreams"	Weller, Simon Dine	2:48
3.	"All I Wanna Do (Is Be With You)" (released as a single)		4:36
4.	"Have You Made Up Your Mind" (released as a single)		3:15
5.	"Empty Ring"	Weller, Simon Dine	3:03
6.	"Invisible"		4:07
7.	"Song For Alice"	Weller, Simon Dine, Steve Cradock	3:38
8.	"Cold Moments"		5:00
9.	"The Dark Pages of September Lead to the New Leaves of Spring"	Simon Dine, Weller	0:45
10.	"Black River"		3:48
11.	"Why Walk When You Can Run"		4:14
12.	"Push It Along"	Weller, Simon Dine	2:53
13.	"A Dream Reprise"	Simon Dine, Weller	1:09
14.	"Echoes Round the Sun"	Weller, Noel Gallagher	3:09
15.	"One Bright Star"	Weller, Simon Dine	2:58
16.	"Lullaby Für Kinder"		2:23
17.	"Where'er Ye Go"		2:47
18.	"God"		2:03
19.	"111"	Weller, Simon Dine, Steve Cradock	2:24
20.	"Sea Spray" (released as a single)	Weller, Hannah Andrews	3:55
21.	"Night Lights"	Weller, Steve Cradock, Charles Rees, Hannah Andrews	6:07

UK iTunes bonus track
No.	Title	Writer(s)	Length
22.	"Echoes Round the Sun" (Live)	Weller, Noel Gallagher	2:55

=== Deluxe Edition Disc 2 ===
1. "22 Dreams [original demo]"
2. "Rip the Pages Up"
3. "Light Nights [original demo]"
4. "Cold Moments [original demo]"
5. "Love's Got Me Crazy"
6. "Invisible [Marco version]"
7. "Big Brass Buttons [instrumental]"
8. "22 Dreams [instrumental]" (Weller, Simon Dine)

== Personnel ==
- Steve Cradock – 12 String Guitar (1), Vocals (3,4,9,12), Guitar (3,4,7,8,12,14,20,21), Drums (4,8,12,14,20), Celeste (4,21), Piano (7,21), Percussion (8,12,20), Electric Guitar (11), Acoustic Guitar (11,18), Mellotron (19), Mandolin (20), Bazooki (20)
- Hannah Andrews – Vocals (1,9,12,15,18,20,21), Horns (20), Hornpipes (20)
- John McCusker – Violin (1,17)
- Andy Lewis – Cello (1), Bass (3)
- Barrie Cadogan – Guitar (2,13)
- Billy Skinner – Drums (2,13)
- Lewis Wharton – Bass (2,13)
- Simon Dine – Cowbell (2), Horns (2,13), Guitar (2,12), Siren (2), Orchestration (5,7,9,15,20), Percussion (5,7,9), Marimba (12), Moog (12,19), Oo-Ahh (12), Sonic Elements (13), Mandolin (15)
- Charles Rees – Drums (3), Moog (21), Harmonium (21), Piano (21)
- Robert Wyatt – Trumpet (7), Piano (7)
- Steve White – (8)
- Graham Coxon – Drums (10)
- Models Own – Peacock Voices (10)
- Pete Howard – Drums (12)
- Noel Gallagher – Bass (14), Piano (14), Mellotron (14), Wurlitzer (14)
- Gem Archer – Guitar (14), Mellotron (14)
- Terry Kirkbridge – Drums (14)
- Steve Brookes – Spanish Guitar (15)
- Arlia de Ruiter – Violin (16)
- Lorre Lynn Trytten – Violin (16)
- Mieke Honinh – Viola (16)
- William Friede – Arrangement (16)
- Aziz Ibrahim – Spoken Word (18)
- God – Thunder (21), Rain (21), Elements (21)

== Charts ==
Chart performance for 22 Dreams
Chart (2008)	Peak position
Australian Albums (ARIA)	30
Austrian Albums (Ö3 Austria)	49
Belgian Albums (Ultratop Flanders)	27
Dutch Albums (Album Top 100)	30
German Albums (Offizielle Top 100)	30
Irish Albums (IRMA)	6
Italian Albums (FIMI)	34
Norwegian Albums (VG-lista)	38
Scottish Albums (Official Charts)	2
UK Albums (Official Charts)	1
