= Heavy Soul (Paul Weller album) =

Studio album by Paul Weller
- Released: 23 June 1997
- Studios: Woolhall Studios, Bath
- Genres: Rock, rhythm and blues, blue-eyed soul
- Length: 40:44
- Label: Island
- Producers: Paul Weller; Brendan Lynch

Paul Weller chronology
Stanley Road (1995)	Heavy Soul (1997)	Modern Classics: The Greatest Hits (1998)

Professional ratings
Review scores
Source	Rating
AllMusic	4/5 stars
The Encyclopedia of Popular Music	5/5 stars
Entertainment Weekly	A−
NME	5/10
Pitchfork Media	8.6/10
Rolling Stone	3/5 stars
The Village Voice	C

Heavy Soul is the fourth solo album by English singer-songwriter Paul Weller, released on 23 June 1997. The album received largely favourable reviews. On the UK Albums Chart, it sold enough to be the number-one album on the week of release; however, it was denied this position on a technicality: five postcards were included with the album, which exceeded the Chart Supervisory Committee's (CSC) limit of four. To rectify this error, representatives of Island Records and Independiente removed one postcard from each copy of the album. On 26 June, with the issue resolved, the CSC began to record sales, and the album debuted at number two on 29 June.

== Track listing ==
All tracks composed by Paul Weller; except where indicated.

Heavy Soul track listing
No.	Title	Lyrics	Music	Length
1.	"Heavy Soul (Pt. 1)"			3:56
2.	"Peacock Suit"			3:12
3.	"Up in Suzes' Room""			4:24
4.	"Brushed"	Paul Weller	Paul Weller, Mark Alan "Marco" Nelson, Steve White	3:27
5.	"Driving Nowhere"			2:57
6.	"I Should Have Been There to Inspire You"			5:14
7.	"Heavy Soul (Pt. 2)"			3:10
8.	"Friday Street"			2:18
9.	"Science"			3:33
10.	"Golden Sands"			2:55
11.	"As You Lean Into the Light"			2:45
12.	"Mermaids"			3:03
Total length:				40:44

The Japanese edition included a bonus track, "Eye of the Storm" which was originally on the B-side of the "Peacock Suit" single.

== Personnel ==
- Paul Weller – guitar, vocals, tamboura (1), zither (3), piano (6), vibraphone (7)
- Mark Alan "Marco" Nelson – bass guitar, sitar (2,7), ukulele (3)
- Steve White – drums

with:

- Steve Cradock – guitar (1,2)
- Brendan Lynch – keyboards (3,5,11), accordion (6)
- Jools Holland – Wurlitzer piano (10)
- Rosie Wetters – string arrangements, extra vocals (7)
- Wired Strings – strings

Technical

- Martin "Max" Heyes – engineer
- Simon Halfon, Paul Weller – artwork

== Charts ==
=== Weekly charts ===
Chart (1997)	Peak position
Australian Albums (ARIA)	100
Dutch Albums (Album Top 100)	80
Scottish Albums (Official Charts)	3
UK Albums (Official Charts)	2

=== Year-end charts ===
Chart (1997)	Position
UK Albums (OCC)	59
