= Out of the Sinking =

1994 single by Paul Weller

Single by Paul Weller

from the album Stanley Road
- B-side: "Sexy Sadie"
- Released: 1994
- Length: 4:11
- Label: Go! Discs
- Songwriter(s): Paul Weller
- Producer(s): Brendan Lynch, Paul Weller

Paul Weller singles chronology
"Hung Up" (1994)	"Out of the Sinking" (1994)	"The Changingman" (1995)

Music video
- "Out of the Sinking" on YouTube

"Out of the Sinking" is a song by British singer-songwriter Paul Weller, released in 1994 by Go! Discs as the first single from his third solo album, Stanley Road (1995). Weller wrote the song and produced it with Brendan Lynch. The B-side to the single is a cover of the Beatles' "Sexy Sadie".

"Out of the Sinking" originally reached No. 20 on the UK Singles Chart upon release its release. In February 1996, it was re-released and reached a new peak of No. 16. The B-side to the single on the 1996 re-issue is a cover of Bob Dylan's "I Shall Be Released". According to Weller, he wrote "Out of the Sinking" as a "great English Mod love song" and took inspiration from the Small Faces.

== Critical reception ==
Paul Mathur from Melody Maker said that "Out of the Sinking" "is far from the best of Paul Weller's recent releases, slumping at times into the sort of aimlessness that Van Morrison has made his own." Dele Fadele from NME wrote that the song "is a kind of object lesson in getting rid of depression, and, in these post-Nirvana times, putting all those obsessions with death and decay and turmoil and exorcism behind you. A pleasant, summery soupçon of hippy dreams." Another NME editor, Ted Kessler, complimented it as a "well-crafted" single and "bright, vaguely optimistic". Gina Morris from Smash Hits gave "Out of the Sinking" two out of five.

== Music video ==
The accompanying music video for "Out of the Sinking" was directed by Pedro Romhanyi and produced by Steven Elliott for Oil Factory. It was released on 17 October 1994 and features fly-on-the-wall footage of Weller in rehearsal and on tour in Japan. Romhanyi had previously directed the videos for "Sunflower", "Wild Wood" and "Hung Up".

== Track listings ==
- 1994 version
1. "Out of the Sinking"
2. "Sexy Sadie"
3. "Sunflower" (Lynch Mob dub)
- 1996 version
1. "Out of the Sinking" (LP version)
2. "I Shall Be Released"
3. "Broken Stones"
4. "Porcelain Gods"

== Charts ==
Chart (1994)	Peak position
Europe (Eurochart Hot 100)	66
Scotland (OCC)	13
UK Singles (OCC)	20
UK Airplay (Music Week)	31

Chart (1996)	Peak position
Europe (Eurochart Hot 100)	70
Scotland (OCC)	7
UK Singles (OCC)	16

== Release history ==
Region	Date	Format(s)	Label(s)	Ref.
United Kingdom	1994	7-inch vinyl; 12-inch vinyl; CD; cassette	Go! Discs	
United Kingdom (re-release)	26 February 1996	7-inch vinyl; CD	Go! Discs	
