= Fly on the Wall: B Sides & Rarities =

Compilation album by Paul Weller
- Released: 2003
- Recorded: 1990–2002
- Genre: Rock
- Label: Universal Music

Paul Weller chronology
Illumination (2002)	Fly on the Wall: B Sides & Rarities (2003)	Studio 150 (2004)

Fly on the Wall: B Sides & Rarities is a 2003 compilation album by British artist Paul Weller. It comprises three discs of B-sides, rarities, remixes and unreleased tracks from The Go! Discs and Island Records period of Weller's career between 1991 and 2001.

The Bournemouth Daily Echo said that the album presents "Weller's more experimental side" and while fans will love it, the music will also give others a "new slant on Paul Weller's canon".

== Track listing ==
Disc One

1. "Here's a New Thing"
2. "That Spiritual Feeling" (Instrumental)
3. "Into Tomorrow" (Demo Version)
4. "Arrival Time" [Instrumental)
5. "Fly on the Wall"
6. "Always There to Fool You" (Instrumental)
7. "All Year Round"
8. "Ends of the Earth"
9. "This is No Time"
10. "Another New Day" (Instrumental)
11. "Foot of the Mountain" (Live)
12. "Wild Wood" ('Portishead' Remix)
13. "Kosmos" ('Lynch Mob Bonus Beats' Remix)

Disc Two

1. "The Loved"
2. "Steam" (Instrumental)
3. "It's a New Day Baby"
4. "A Year Late"
5. "Eye of the Storm" (Instrumental)
6. "Shoot The Dove"
7. "As You Lean into The Light"
8. "So You Want To Be a Dancer" (Instrumental)
9. "Everything Has a Price to Pay" (1997 'Acoustic' Version)
10. "Right Underneath It"
11. "Helioscentric" (Instrumental)
12. "There's No Drinking After You're Dead" ('Noonday Underground' Remix)
13. "The Riverbank"
14. "Science" (Lynch Mob Remix)

Disc Three – 'Button Downs'

1. "Feelin' Alright"
2. "Ohio" (Live at R.A.H. October 1992, B.B.C. Recording)
3. "Black Sheep Boy"
4. "Sexy Sadie"
5. "I Shall Be Released"
6. "I'd Rather Go Blind"
7. "My Whole World is Falling Down" (BBC Session May 1995)
8. "Ain't No Love in the Heart of the City"
9. "Waiting on an Angel" (BBC Session – 23.11.97)
10. "Bang-Bang"
11. "Instant Karma"
12. "Don't Let Me Down"

Sources

- Disc 1, Tracks 1–3: B-sides of “Into Tomorrow” single
- Disc 1, Tracks 4–6: B-sides of “Uh Huh Oh Yeh” single
- Disc 1, Track 7 and Disc 3 Track 3: More Wood Japanese Import Album
- Disc 1, Track 8: B-side of “Wild Wood” single
- Disc 1, Tracks 9–10 and Disc 3, Track 2: B-sides of “The Weaver” single
- Disc 1, Track 12 and Disc 2, Track 14: B-side of “Wild Wood” single (1998 version)
- Disc 1, Tracks 11, 13 and Disc 2, Track 1: B-sides of “Hung Up” single
- Disc 2, Tracks 2: B-side of “Broken Stones” single
- Disc 2, Tracks 3 and Disc 3, Track 6: B-sides of “The Changing Man” single
- Disc 2, Tracks 4 and Disc 3, Track 7: B-sides of “You Do Something to Me” single
- Disc 2, Tracks 5: B-side of “Peacock” single
- Disc 2, Tracks 6, 7 and Disc 3, Track 8: B-sides of “Brushed” single
- Disc 2, Tracks 8 and 9: B-sides of “Mermaids” single
- Disc 2, Tracks 10 and 13: B-sides of “Brand New Start” single
- Disc 2, Track 11 and Disc 3, Track 10: B-sides of "The Keeper" single
- Disc 3, Track 1: B-side of “Above the Clouds” single and More Wood Japanese Import Album
- Disc 3, Tracks Tracks 4 and 5: B-sides of “Out of the Sinking” single
- Disc 3, Tracks 9 and 12: Previously unreleased
- Disc 3, Track 11: Previously only available on “Uncut” Cover-CD
