= Broken Stones =

1995 single by Paul Weller

Single by Paul Weller

from the album Stanley Road
- B-side: "Steam"
- Released: 18 September 1995
- Length: 3:16
- Label: Go! Discs
- Songwriter: Paul Weller
- Producers: Brendan Lynch; Paul Weller

Paul Weller singles chronology
"You Do Something to Me" (1995)	"Broken Stones" (1995)	"Out of the Sinking" (1996)

"Broken Stones" is a song by English singer-songwriter Paul Weller, released in September 1995 by Go! Discs as the fourth single from his third solo album, Stanley Road (1995). It was written by Weller and co-produced by him with Brendan Lynch. The song reached No. 20 on the UK Singles Chart the same month. Weller was inspired to write the track after a conversation he had with his son at the beach, with the idea that people were like a broken stone trying to become whole again.

== Critical reception ==
Pan-European magazine Music & Media wrote, "Mid-tempo scorchers like 'Broken Stones' with its Memphis-soul-meets-New-Orleans feeling keep the rhythmic tension at cooking level." Ted Kessler from NME named the song a "soul ballad" and "a distant and healthy cousin of The Jam's 'Ghosts'".

== Charts ==
Chart (1995)	Peak position
Europe (Eurochart Hot 100)	81
Scotland Singles (OCC)	11
UK Singles (OCC)	20

== Release history ==
Region	Date	Format(s)	Label(s)	Ref.
United Kingdom	18 September 1995	7-inch vinyl; CD; cassette	Go! Discs	
Australia	30 October 1995	CD; cassette	Go! Discs	
