= Catch-Flame! =

Live album by Paul Weller
- Released: 25 July 2006
- Recorded: 5 December 2005
- Genre: Rock
- Label: Yep Roc

Paul Weller chronology
As Is Now (2005)	Catch-Flame! (2006)	Hit Parade (2006)

Professional ratings
Review scores
Source	Rating
AllMusic	4/5 stars

Catch-Flame! was recorded at London's Alexandra Palace and is Paul Weller's third solo live album.

Recorded on 5 December – the last date of Weller's 2005 UK tour – it features live versions of songs spanning his career, including those of The Jam and The Style Council. Five songs played at the concert were omitted from the CD: Mermaids, Amongst Butterflies, Early Morning Rain, Here's The Good News, and We All Need Love, a duet with The Charlatans' Tim Burgess. Catch-Flame! entered the UK chart at #17 on 18 June 2006.

== Track listing ==
Disc One

1. "The Weaver"
2. "Out of the Sinking"
3. "Blink and You'll Miss It"
4. "Paper Smile"
5. "Peacock Suit"
6. "From the Floorboards Up"
7. "The Changingman"
8. "Savages"
9. "Going Places"
10. "Up in Suzes' Room"
11. "Porcelain Gods/I Walk on Gilded Splinters"

Disc Two

1. "In the Crowd"
2. "Come On/Let's Go"
3. "Foot of the Mountain"
4. "You Do Something to Me"
5. "Wishing on a Star"
6. "Wild Wood"
7. "The Pebble & The Boy"
8. "That's Entertainment"
9. "Broken Stones"
10. "Long Hot Summer"
11. "Shout to the Top"
12. "Town Called Malice"
