= Wild Wood =

Studio album by Paul Weller
- Released: 6 September 1993
- Recorded: April–May 1993
- Studios: The Manor Studio, Oxfordshire
- Genre: Rock
- Length: 54:04
- Label: Go! Discs
- Producers: Paul Weller; Brendan Lynch

Paul Weller chronology
Paul Weller (1992)	Wild Wood (1993)	Live Wood (1994)
Hit Parade (2006)	Wild Wood – Deluxe Edition (2007)	Live at the Royal Albert Hall (2008)

Wild Wood is the second solo studio album by English singer-songwriter Paul Weller, released in September 1993. It reached number 2 on the UK Albums Chart and spawned four hit singles: "Wild Wood" (peaked at number 14), "Sunflower" (reached number 16), "The Weaver" (released as "The Weaver EP", peaked at number 18) and "Hung Up" (reached number 11 on the UK Singles Charts).

The original 1993 UK and European CD editions contained 15 tracks. A sixteenth track was added to the US release and the 1994 UK reissue. A two-disc deluxe edition was released on 22 October 2007.

The title track, "Wild Wood", was released as a single in 1993, with "Ends of the Earth" as its B-side. It reached number 14 on the UK charts in September that year.

== Critical reception ==
Professional ratings
Review scores
Source	Rating
AllMusic	4.5/5 stars
Entertainment Weekly	A−
Mojo	5/5 stars
NME	7/10
Q	4/5 stars
Record Collector	5/5 stars
Rolling Stone	4/5 stars
Select	4/5
Spin	4/5 stars
Uncut	5/5 stars

Wild Wood was released to enthusiastic reviews from critics. In Melody Maker, Taylor Parkes raved that "Wild Wood is, on its own sweet terms, a triumph", while in Select, Adam Higginbotham called it "the album that his solo debut should have been" and "an album of good pop songs to some; to others, a reassuring sign that the man is back on track". Paul Moody also offered qualified praise in NME, deeming it "not the absolute tour de force we may have hoped for", but nonetheless "three-quarters of the way to marking a complete rebirth." Rolling Stone's Tom Sinclair wrote that Wild Wood "gives retrochic an unexpected twist" and found it "charmingly anomalous, a smart, left-field stroke capable of transporting the listener to a dimly remembered land of pop delights." Dimitri Ehrlich of Entertainment Weekly noted the album's "intricate" music, describing it as a cross between "the gruff-punk charge" of Weller's band the Jam and "the refinement and musicality" of his later band the Style Council.

In a retrospective review, AllMusic critic Stephen Thomas Erlewine lauded Wild Wood as Weller's "first true masterwork since ending the Jam", further crediting it with helping to "kick off the trad rock that dominated British music during the '90s." Record Collector's Lois Wilson said that the record, in addition to its "lyrical and musical depth", exhibited Weller's "renewed belief in his guitar playing", and "marked a critical and commercial rebirth" for Weller. Paul Moody reappraised the album more effusively in Uncut in 2007, writing that the album's "nostalgic mood hit a nerve with both lapsed Jam fans and young upstarts Blur and Oasis", and that "it's Weller's unshakeable self-belief which marks Wild Wood out as a landmark in British rock. Within a year of its release ... grunge would be over, Britpop would be in full swing, and fears of rock's demise dismissed as a bad dream."

In 2000, Q placed Wild Wood at number 77 on its list of the "100 Greatest British Albums Ever". Wild Wood was also included in the book 1001 Albums You Must Hear Before You Die.

Uncut rated "Wild Wood" as Weller's ninth best ever song and the best of his solo career, with the Smiths' bassist Andy Rourke praising it as a "very easy, kicking-back sort of song".

== Track listing ==
No.	Title	Writer(s)	Length
1.	"Sunflower"	Paul Weller	4:06
2.	"Can You Heal Us (Holy Man)"	Weller	3:41
3.	"Wild Wood"	Weller	3:22
4.	"Instrumental (Pt 1)"	Weller, Brendan Lynch, Steve White	1:37
5.	"All the Pictures on the Wall"	Weller	3:56
6.	"Has My Fire Really Gone Out?"	Weller	3:50
7.	"Country"	Weller	3:39
8.	"Instrumental Two"	Weller, Lynch, White	0:50
9.	"5th Season"	Weller	4:54
10.	"The Weaver"	Weller	3:43
11.	"Instrumental One (Pt 2)"	Weller, Lynch, White	0:34
12.	"Foot of the Mountain"	Weller	3:37
13.	"Shadow of the Sun"	Weller	7:36
14.	"Holy Man (reprise)"	Weller	1:50
15.	"Moon on Your Pyjamas"	Weller	4:00
16.	"Hung Up"	Weller	2:49

Deluxe edition box set bonus tracks
No.	Title	Length
17.	"Wild Wood" (Sheared Wood (Mix/ Remix) / Paul Weller VS Portishead)	3:28
18.	"Magic Bus" (contains medley of Bull Rush)	5:29
19.	"Ends of the Earth"	2:24
20.	"This Is No Time" (Royal Albert Hall live version)	6:02
21.	"Another New Day"	3:19
22.	"The Loved"	3:00

Deluxe edition box set bonus disc
No.	Title	Length
1.	"Sunflower" (demo)	4:13
2.	"Wildwood" (demo)	4:02
3.	"All the Pictures on the Wall" (demo)	4:49
4.	"Country" (demo)	3:32
5.	"5th Season" (demo)	5:57
6.	"The Weaver" (demo)	4:15
7.	"Shadow of the Sun" (demo)	5:30
8.	"Moon on Your Pyjamas" (demo)	3:45
9.	"Ends of the Earth" (demo)	2:56
10.	"Love of the Loved" (demo)	4:41
11.	"Price to Pay" (demo)	3:36
12.	"Changes" (demo)	2:50
13.	"I'm Only Dreaming" (previously unreleased)	2:54
14.	"Ohio" (demo)	3:34
15.	"Oh Happy Day" (previously unreleased)	3:28
16.	"Greetings" (previously unreleased)	3:32
17.	"Wild Wood" (demo)	3:34
18.	"Weaver of Dreams" (demo version 2)	3:27
19.	"Foot of the Mountain" (exclusive BBC recording)	3:35
20.	"Hung Up" (exclusive BBC recording)	2:57
21.	"Black Sheep Boy" (exclusive BBC recording)	2:10

== Personnel ==
- Paul Weller – guitars, vocals (on all except 4, 8, 11), Mellotron (1, 2, 13, 14), Minimoog (1, 4, 11), piano (2, 7, 9, 10, 13, 14), Hammond organ (2, 5, 6, 14), bass (2, 5, 14), percussion and handclaps (2, 14), blues harp (6, 9), electric piano and percussion (6), strings (7)
- Marco Nelson – bass (1, 3, 4, 6, 9–11, 13, 15), backing vocals (6)
- Steve White – drums (1–6, 9–11, 13–16), percussion (1, 4, 8, 11)
- Jacko Peake – horns (2, 4, 9, 11, 14), flute (2, 14)
- Brendan Lynch – percussion and handclaps (2, 14), Minimoog (3, 9, 13), Mellotron (3, 13), Stylophone (7)
- Max Beesley – percussion and handclaps (2, 14), backing vocals (6), Wurlitzer (15)
- Helen Turner – organ (3)
- Dr Robert – guitars (6, 7)
- Dee C. Lee – backing vocals (9, 13, 15)
- David Liddle – lead guitar (9)
- Mick Talbot – Hammond organ (9)
- Steve Cradock – electric guitar (10)
- Simon Fowler – backing vocals (10)
- Yolanda Charles – bass (16)

== Charts ==
=== Weekly charts ===
Weekly chart performance for Wild Wood
Chart (1993)	Peak position
Australian Albums (ARIA)	135
Swedish Albums (Sverigetopplistan)	42
UK Albums (Official Charts)	2

Chart (2026)	Peak position
Greek Albums (IFPI)	29

=== Year-end charts ===
1993 year-end chart performance for Wild Wood
Chart (1993)	Position
UK Albums (OCC)	58
