= Paul Weller (album) =

Studio album by Paul Weller
- Released: 29 April 1992 (Japan); 1 September 1992 (UK)
- Recorded: August 1990–November 1991
- Genre: Rock
- Length: 53:36 (UK)
- Label: Go! Discs Records 828343 (UK)
- Producers: Paul Weller; Brendan Lynch

Paul Weller chronology
Paul Weller (1992)	Wild Wood (1993)
Just a Dream - 22 Dreams Live (2009)	Paul Weller - Deluxe Edition (2009)	Wake Up the Nation (2010)

Paul Weller is the debut solo studio album by the English singer-songwriter Paul Weller, released in 1992.

== Background ==
After disbanding The Style Council and leaving label Polydor in 1989, Weller formed The Paul Weller Movement in 1990, releasing a single, "Into Tomorrow", on his own Freedom High record label, in October 1991. Its success - reaching No. 36 in the UK chart - led to Weller being offered a new record deal with Go! Discs.

Recorded over the two years before the album's original Japanese release, this album represents something of a return to Weller's musical roots, with "Into Tomorrow" and "Uh Huh Oh Yeh" in particular being influenced by 1960s R&B. According to Weller, "'Uh Huh Oh Yeh' – and, after it, the Stanley Road album – was me revisiting my roots. I hadn't been down to Woking in a long time. That was the first time, in the early '90s, when I was finding my feet again." The album as a whole retained some of the funk influences displayed by The Style Council, particularly on "I Didn't Mean To Hurt You" and "Remember How We Started". However, the explicit political leanings of The Style Council are abandoned, with the lyrical themes visited on the album being much more personal.

== Release ==
The album entered the UK Albums Chart on 12 September 1992, reaching number eight and staying on the chart for seven weeks. The album peaked at No. 108 in Australia.

Before the UK edition of the album, it had already been released in Japan on 29 April 1992. The track listing differs from subsequent releases, and the running order is altered. The track "New Thing" (a different recording of "Here's a New Thing" from the "Into Tomorrow" single) was replaced by "The Strange Museum" on all other versions. Until 2009, "New Thing" was unique to this release.

In addition to "Into Tomorrow", included on the album, two further singles were released from the album - "Uh Huh Oh Yeh", on 15 August 1992, reaching No. 18, and "Above the Clouds" on 10 October 1992, reaching No. 47.

A deluxe edition of the album was released on 26 October 2009 and reached No. 88 in the UK Albums Chart.

== Critical reception ==
Professional ratings
Review scores
Source	Rating
AllMusic	4/5 stars
Entertainment Weekly	A−
Mojo	4/5 stars
NME	7/10
Q	2/5 stars
Record Collector	4/5 stars
Rolling Stone	2/5 stars
Select	2/5
Smash Hits	4/5
Uncut	8/10

In a middling review for Select, Adam Higginbotham opined that Weller "seems lost", and that "the ideas and sounds here are so extensively retro that Weller might as well have never left his house after 1975." Steve Sutherland lambasted the album in Melody Maker, calling it "utterly bereft of virtue in the same way as a Paul McCartney record is" and suggesting that Weller's "muse is dead". David Quantick, however, wrote in NME that while Paul Weller may disappoint listeners "expecting a veering away" from Weller's "jazz café soul direction", its songs are nonetheless tuneful and "played with conviction". Entertainment Weekly's Jim Farber favourably compared the record's sound to that of the Style Council, "only now with a high spark."

Stephen Thomas Erlewine of AllMusic later wrote that Paul Weller "is sometimes overlooked, but it's one of his finest records, a smooth, soulful excursion pitched precisely between the sophisticated swing of the Style Council and the rustic rock of Wild Wood." He concluded that "everything here laid the groundwork for the third act of Weller's career and it remains compelling and alluring in its own right."

== Track listing ==
All songs written by Paul Weller, except where noted.

UK Issue
No.	Title	Writer(s)	Length
1.	"Uh Huh Oh Yeh"		3:13
2.	"I Didn't Mean to Hurt You"		3:27
3.	"Bull-Rush"		4:43
4.	"Round and Round"		4:25
5.	"Remember How We Started"		3:44
6.	"Above the Clouds"		4:13
7.	"Clues"		4:24
8.	"Into Tomorrow"		3:07
9.	"Amongst Butterflies"		3:13
10.	"The Strange Museum"	Weller, Mick Talbot	3:17
11.	"Bitterness Rising"		3:53
12.	"Kosmos"		11:57

Original Japanese Issue
No.	Title	Length
1.	"Uh Huh Oh Yeh"	3:12
2.	"I Didn't Mean to Hurt You"	3:28
3.	"Bull-Rush"	4:44
4.	"Remember How We Started"	3:44
5.	"Above the Clouds"	3:50
6.	"Round and Round"	4:52
7.	"Clues"	4:24
8.	"Into Tomorrow"	3:30
9.	"Amongst Butterflies"	2:34
10.	"Bitterness Rising"	4:28
11.	"New Thing"	3:31
12.	"Kosmos"	11:55

Deluxe Edition (Disc 1)
No.	Title	Length
1.	"Uh Huh Oh Yeh"
2.	"I Didn't Mean to Hurt You"
3.	"Bull-Rush"
4.	"Round and Round"
5.	"Remember How We Started"
6.	"Above the Clouds"
7.	"Clues"
8.	"Into Tomorrow"
9.	"Amongst Butterflies"
10.	"Bitterness Rising"
11.	"Kosmos"
12.	"Here's A New Thing" (B-side)
13.	"That Spiritual Feeling" (B-side)
14.	"Into Tomorrow" (demo) (B-side)
15.	"Arrival Time" (B-side)
16.	"Fly on the Wall" (B-side)
17.	"Always There To Fool You" (B-side)
18.	"Everything Has A Price To Pay" (B-side)

Deluxe Edition (Disc 2)
No.	Title	Writer(s)	Length
1.	"All Year Round" (B-side)
2.	"Feelin' Alright?" (B-side)	Dave Mason
3.	"'Hot Rod'" (demo)
4.	"Round and Round" (alternative version)
5.	"Remember How We Started" (demo)
6.	"Clues" (demo)
7.	"Into Tomorrow" (acoustic version)
8.	"Butterflies" (acoustic version)
9.	"Bitterness Rising" (original version)
10.	"Kosmos" (demo)
11.	"New Thing" (alternative version)
12.	"Fly on the Wall" (demo)
13.	"The Bitter Truth" (demo)
14.	"Amongst Butterflies" (demo)
15.	"Abraham, Martin & John" (acoustic version)	Dick Holler
16.	"Kosmos" ('Lynch Mob beats' version)

== Personnel ==
- Paul Weller – lead vocals, guitars, bass (1–8, 10, 11), keyboards, percussion
- Steve White – drums, percussion
- Jacko Peake – saxophone (1, 2, 4, 5, 8, 9, 11, 12), flute (4, 6, 7, 11, 12), backing vocals
- Dr. Robert – bass (12), backing vocals (3, 8)
- "Brother" Marco Nelson – bass (9)
- Dee C. Lee – backing vocals (3, 5, 11, 12)
- Camelle Hinds – backing vocals (4, 12)
- Carleen Anderson – backing vocals (12)

=== Technical ===
- Produced by Paul Weller and Brendan Lynch
- Co-produced by Chris Bangs (6)
- Engineered by Martin "Max" Heyes (1–7, 10–12), Paul Gumersall (8), and Robin Black (9)
- Assistant engineer – Paul O'Farrell-Stevens
- Mixed by Brendan Lynch and Martin "Max" Heyes
- Photography – Nick Knight and Lawrence Watson
- Design – Simon Halfon (3 Lions Design Associates) and Paul Weller

== See also ==
- Road to Freedom (1991)
- Modernism: A New Decade (1998)
