= Days of Speed =

Live album by Paul Weller
- Released: 8 October 2001 (UK); 2 July 2002 (US)
- Recorded: 19 March – 4 July 2001
- Genre: Rock; acoustic
- Length: 68:41
- Label: Independiente
- Producer: Tony Cousins; Andrew Jones; Charles Rees

Paul Weller chronology
Heliocentric (2000)	Days of Speed (2001)	Illumination (2002)

Professional ratings
Review scores
Source	Rating
AllMusic	3.5/5 stars

Days of Speed is Paul Weller's second live album, released on 8 October 2001 in the UK and 2 July 2002 in the US. All songs were performed solo and acoustic from various venues around Europe.

== Track listing ==
All tracks by Paul Weller

1. "Brand New Start" – 3:46
2. "The Loved" – 4:23
3. "Out of the Sinking" – 3:33
4. "Clues" – 4:40
5. "English Rose" – 2:44
6. "Above the Clouds" – 3:45
7. "You Do Something to Me" – 3:43
8. "Amongst Butterflies" – 2:57
9. "Science" – 3:53
10. "Back in the Fire" – 4:57
11. "Down in the Seine" – 2:58
12. "That's Entertainment" – 3:29
13. "Love-Less" – 4:48
14. "There's No Drinking, After You're Dead" – 4:33
15. "Everything Has a Price to Pay" – 4:06
16. "Wild Wood" – 4:08
17. "Headstart for Happiness" – 2:51
18. "Town Called Malice" – 3:27
19. "The Butterfly Collector" (iTunes Bonus Track) – 3:44
20. "Carnation" (iTunes Bonus Track) – 3:25

== Personnel ==
- Tony Cousins – Mastering
- Seamus Fenton – Engineer
- Simon Halfon – Cover Design, Sleeve Art, Sleeve Design
- Andrew Jones – Engineer, Mixing
- Pete Mason – Executive Producer
- Charles Rees – Mixing
- Clive Sparkman – Guitar
- Lawrence Watson – Photography
- Paul Weller – Guitar (Acoustic), Vocals, Cover Design, Sleeve Art, Sleeve Design

== Charts ==
=== Weekly charts ===
Chart (2001)	Peak position
Irish Albums (IRMA)	20
Scottish Albums (OCC)	3
UK Albums (OCC)	3

=== Year-end charts ===
Chart (2001)	Position
UK Albums (OCC)	51
