= You Do Something to Me (Paul Weller song) =

Single by Paul Weller

from the album Stanley Road
- B-side: "My Whole World Is Falling Down"
- Released: 10 July 1995
- Length: 3:40
- Label: Go! Discs
- Songwriter: Paul Weller
- Producers: Brendan Lynch; Paul Weller

Paul Weller singles chronology
"The Changingman" (1995)	"You Do Something to Me" (1995)	"Broken Stones" (1995)

Music video
- "You Do Something to Me" on YouTube

"You Do Something to Me" is a song by British singer-songwriter Paul Weller, released in July 1995 by Go! Discs as the third single from his third solo album, Stanley Road (1995). The song, written by Weller and produced by him with Brendan Lynch, reached number nine on the UK Singles Chart and was a top-30 hit in the Netherlands. According to Weller, the song is about unattainable love, despite being a popular number at wedding receptions. Its music video was directed by writer and director Sonja Phillips.

== Critical reception ==
David Stubbs from Melody Maker described the song as "balmy". Another Melody Maker editor, Paul Mathur, stated that it "could easily be played on Radio 2. Maybe it already is. And it's got a chorus about dancing through the fire to catch a flame that wouldn't necessarily find it too hard to fit in at a Bryan Adams Metaphors Convention. And there's a guitar solo that bunked off from Eric Clapton's residency at the Albert Hall." Music & Media wrote, "All new hip bands name Weller as their main man and have the same '60s flowerpot hairdo. Isn't it time you took some time from your oasis of new releases for this melancholic ballad?" Johnny Dee from NME commented, "You might as well start buying Chris De Burgh if 'You Do Something to Me' does something to you, since it sounds like 'You Look Wonderful Tonight' anyway. It is the very essence of dullness, all guitar noodles, cod cool, meaningful vocals and a rock of ages arrangement." Leesa Daniels from Smash Hits was negative and gave it one out of five in her review of the single.

== Charts ==
Chart (1995)	Peak position
Australia (ARIA)	142
Netherlands (Single Top 100)	21
UK Singles (OCC)	9

== Certifications ==
Region	Certification	Certified units/sales
United Kingdom (BPI)	Platinum	600,000^{‡}
^{‡} Sales+streaming figures based on certification alone.
