= Wild Wood (Paul Weller song) =

Single by Paul Weller

from the album Wild Wood
- B-side: "Ends of the Earth"
- Released: 23 August 1993
- Genre: Pop rock; folk rock; acoustic rock; pop soul; blue-eyed soul
- Length: 3:22
- Label: Go! Discs
- Songwriter: Paul Weller
- Producer: Brendan Lynch

Paul Weller singles chronology
"Sunflower" (1993)	"Wild Wood" (1993)	"Hung Up" (1994)

Music video
- "Wild Wood" on YouTube

"Wild Wood" is a song by British singer-songwriter Paul Weller, released in August 1993 by Go! Discs as the second single from the singer's second solo album, Wild Wood (1993). The song was written by Weller and produced by Brendan Lynch, peaking at number 14 on the UK Singles Charts and being certified silver by the British Phonographic Industry (BPI). A music video directed by Pedro Romhanyi was produced to promote the single. Portishead remixed the song for the 1999 re-release.

== Critical reception ==
David Beran from the Gavin Report described the song as "a laid back acoustic sojourn with a Neil Young feel". He added, "Weller's songwriting talents are hard to deny". Caroline Sullivan from The Guardian wrote in her album review, "The searching, almost spiritual title tune wafted along by barely-there bass and acoustic guitar, is nothing less than delectable". Another The Guardian editor, Alexis Petridis, ranked 'Wild Wood' number four in his list of "Paul Weller's 30 Greatest Songs -- ranked!" in 2021. He wrote, "You could trace the roots of Weller's folky bent back to the Jam's 'English Rose' and 'Liza Radley', but 'Wild Wood' remains its finest flowering. The gorgeously understated music suggests getting it together in the country, but — as on Weller favourite Nick Drake's Bryter Layter — the lyrical setting is distinctly urban. Killer Portishead remix too." Taylor Parkes from Melody Maker declared it as "passionate and rural", [...] a heavenly mash of Nick Drake and the Small Faces, feeding off Weller's own startling rebirth."

A reviewer from Music Week praised the song as "arguably the highlight" of the singer's 1998 album, Modern Classics, declaring it as an "acoustic belter". Paul Moody from NME felt it "sets the tone" of its parent-album, "suggesting a pastoral take on Nick Drake's 'Chime of the City Clock', all strummed guitars and world-weary melancholia." Parry Gettelman from Orlando Sentinel wrote, "The haunting 'Wild Wood' combines a sort of jazz-folk acoustic guitar style with bluesy organ and arty Mellotron while Weller's vocal has a country-soul-gospel feel. Weller's lyrics aren't as complex as his music, but his voice can make a line as ordinary as "Now you're gone, I feel so alone" resonate." Clark Collis from Select said it "proved that he could still pen perfect three-minute pop morsels." Another Select editor, Adam Higginbotham, named it a "pastoral, acoustic number". Uncut ranked it as Weller's ninth best ever song and the best of his solo career in 2015, with the Smiths' bassist Andy Rourke praising it as a "very easy, kicking-back sort of song".

== Track listings ==
- 7-inch single, UK (1993)
1. "Wild Wood"
2. "Ends of the Earth"
- CD single, Europe (1993)
1. "Wild Wood" — 3:22
2. "Ends of the Earth" — 2:27

== Charts ==
Chart (1993)	Peak position
Europe (Eurochart Hot 100)	51
UK Singles (OCC)	14
UK Airplay (Music Week)	24

Chart (1999–2000)	Peak position
Europe (Eurochart Hot 100)	84
Netherlands (Dutch Top 40)	38
Netherlands (Single Top 100)	35
Scotland (OCC)	22
UK Singles (OCC)	22
