= The Changingman =

1995 single by Paul Weller

- Promotional single cover

Single by Paul Weller

from the album Stanley Road
- Released: 24 April 1995
- Genre: Britpop; psychedelic rock; blues rock
- Length: 4:02
- Label: Go! Discs
- Songwriters: Brendan Lynch; Paul Weller; Jeff Lynne
- Producers: Brendan Lynch; Paul Weller

Paul Weller singles chronology
"Out of the Sinking" (1994)	"The Changingman" (1995)	"You Do Something to Me" (1995)

"The Changingman" is a song by British singer-songwriter Paul Weller, released in April 1995 by Go! Discs as the lead single from his third solo album, Stanley Road (1995). The song charted at number seven on the UK Singles Chart.

== Background ==
"The Changingman" was co-written by Brendan Lynch, and performed, written and produced by Paul Weller, who sings and plays guitar, piano and shakers on the record. Carleen Anderson provides back-up vocals, as does Steve Cradock and Dr. Robert, who also play the guitar and bass guitar respectively. In addition, Steve White plays drums and Lynch played the Cyremin.

Weller claimed that the song's title came from the name his daughter Leah gave to one of her dolls, although at the time his friend Terry Rawlings managed a band called that. The song expresses Weller's mantra of breaking things up if they are getting too comfortable; the previous year, he had divorced his wife, Dee C. Lee, breaking up what appeared to the public to be a happy marriage. In an interview with Mojo in 2010, he expressed that this was because there were senses "that things were going too well, we were too happy, too comfortable, everything seemed too nice [and] that for me as a writer and an artist I might lose my edge. I had to break the shape up, re-arrange things", noting that said turmoil supplanted the lyrics of the entire parent album and stated that the lyric 'numbed by the effect, aware of the muse, too in touch with myself, I light the fuse' "was about the process of causing chaos around you".

The main riff is an interpolation of "10538 Overture" by Electric Light Orchestra.

== Chart performance ==
The song peaked at number seven on the UK Singles Chart, spending four weeks on the chart and becoming Weller's first solo top-10 hit.

== Critical reception ==
John Robb from Melody Maker wrote, "'The Changing Man' is not a godlike record but, in some ways, it's reassuring to hear one of the old fellas from the late Seventies still cut some action." Another Melody Maker editor, David Stubbs, remarked "the classic mid-period Who chimes" of the song. Ted Kessler from NME praised it as a "well-crafted" single, describing it as "churning, darkly introspective". Boy George reviewed the song for Select saying, "He's turning into early Eric Clapton in some ways..which is no bad thing. It's just very passionate, and that's something I go for in my heroes."

== Music video ==
A music video was produced for the song. It alternates between clips of Weller singing and playing guitar, shots of model Anjela Lauren Smith dancing, and assorted symbols.

== Certifications ==
Region	Certification	Certified units/sales
United Kingdom (BPI)	Silver	200,000^{‡}
^{‡} Sales+streaming figures based on certification alone.

== Release history ==
Region	Date	Format(s)	Label(s)	Ref.
United Kingdom	24 April 1995	7-inch vinyl; CD; cassette	Go! Discs	
United States	12 June 1995	Progressive rock; alternative radio	Go! Discs; London	
