= As Is Now =

Studio album by Paul Weller
- Released: 10 October 2005
- Recorded: March 2005
- Studio: Wheeler End Studios
- Genre: Rock
- Length: 53:16
- Label: V2
- Producers: Paul Weller; Jan "Stan" Kybert

Paul Weller chronology
Studio 150 (2004)	As Is Now (2005)	Catch-Flame! (2006)

Professional ratings
Aggregate scores
Source	Rating
Metacritic	74/100
Review scores
Source	Rating
AllMusic	4/5 stars
The Independent	(not rated)
NME	7/10 stars
The Observer	3/5 stars
Pitchfork Media	(7.2/10)
Q	4/5 stars

As Is Now is Paul Weller's eighth solo studio album. Released in October 2005, it reached No. 4 in the UK charts.

The singles from the record were "From The Floorboards Up" (charted at No. 6), "Come On/Let's Go" (charted at No. 15), "Here's The Good News" (charted at No. 21) and the four track "The As Is Now EP" (which included "Blink And You'll Miss It") which did not qualify for the charts and was only released on 7-inch.

The CD+DVD edition includes studio footage of "From The Floorboards Up" and "Here's The Good News", the videos of "Come On/Let's Go" and "From The Floorboards Up" and the film "As Is Now". A limited edition double CD was released around the time of the 2006 Brit Awards, for which Weller was nominated. The second disc contained four tracks ("From The Floorboards Up", "Come On / Let's Go", "The Changingman", and "Town Called Malice") recorded live on 5 December 2005 at the Royal Albert Hall in London, England.

"Come On/Let's Go" appears in the soundtrack of Pro Evolution Soccer 2010.

== Recording ==
The album was recorded over a two-week period in March 2005 at Wheeler End Studios, Buckinghamshire. It was then mixed at Studio 150, Amsterdam.

== Track listing ==
All tracks are written by Paul Weller.

No.	Title	Length
1.	"Blink and You'll Miss It"	3:23
2.	"Paper Smile"	3:05
3.	"Come On / Let's Go"	3:16
4.	"Here's the Good News"	2:57
5.	"The Start of Forever"	4:55
6.	"Pan"	2:26
7.	"All on a Misty Morning"	4:30
8.	"From the Floorboards Up"	2:27
9.	"I Wanna Make it Alright"	3:38
10.	"Savages"	2:58
11.	"Fly Little Bird"	3:44
12.	"Roll Along Summer"	3:39
13.	"Bring Back the Funk" (Parts 1 & 2)	7:15
14.	"The Pebble and the Boy"	5:03

Japan Bonus Tracks
No.	Title	Length
15.	"Oranges and Rosewater" (B-side of "From the Floorboards Up" single)	3:04
16.	"Shine On" (B-Side of "Come On/Let's Go" single)	4:09
17.	"Alone" (B-side of "Here’s The Good News" single)
