= Sunflower (Paul Weller song) =

1993 single by Paul Weller

Single by Paul Weller

from the album Wild Wood
- B-side: "Kosmos SXDub 2000"; "Bull-Rush/Magic Bus" (live); "That Spiritual Feeling" (new mix)
- Released: 5 July 1993
- Genre: Psychedelic rock
- Length: 4:11
- Label: Go! Discs
- Songwriter: Paul Weller
- Producers: Brendan Lynch; Paul Weller

Paul Weller singles chronology
"Above the Clouds" (1992)	"Sunflower" (1993)	"Wild Wood" (1993)

Music video
- "Sunflower" on YouTube

"Sunflower" is a song by British singer-songwriter Paul Weller, released in July 1993 by Go! Discs as the first single from his second solo album, Wild Wood (1993). The song was written by Weller and co-produced by him with Brendan Lynch. It peaked at No. 16 on the UK Singles Chart upon its release. Its accompanying music video was directed by Pedro Romhanyi.

== Critical reception ==
Larry Flick from Billboard magazine wrote, "Sly beat and cool guitar chords promise some intriguing rock explorations. However, Weller's assertion that we have no future, we have no past proves only half true—the classic rockisms here in vocal and melody show Weller leaning heavily on the past." Adam Higginbotham from Select complimented the song as "ace". Uncut magazine called "Sunflower" a "shaggy, psychedelic exocet", placing it 23rd in its list of Weller's 30 best songs. The Guardian ranked it number 11 in its list of Weller's top 30 tracks, stating that "more than any song, (it) set Weller's course in the 90s", and describing it as "a twitchy cocktail of Low Spark of High Heeled Boys-era Traffic and soul".

== Track listings ==
- CD and 12-inch single
1. "Sunflower"
2. "Kosmos SXDub 2000"
3. "Bull-Rush/Magic Bus" (live at the Royal Albert Hall, London, October 1992)
4. "That Spiritual Feeling" (new mix)
- 7-inch, cassette, and mini-CD single
1. "Sunflower"
2. "Bull-Rush/Magic Bus" (live at the Royal Albert Hall, London, October 1992)

== Charts ==
Chart (1993)	Peak position
Australia (ARIA)	166
Europe (Eurochart Hot 100)	62
Israel (Israeli Singles Chart)	36
UK Singles (Official Charts)	16
UK Airplay (Music Week)	29

== Release history ==
Region	Date	Format(s)	Label(s)	Ref.
United Kingdom	5 July 1993	7-inch vinyl; 12-inch vinyl; CD; cassette	Go! Discs	
Australia	30 August 1993	CD	Go! Discs	
Japan	1 September 1993	Mini-CD	Canyon International	
