= Paul Weller =

English singer-songwriter and musician (born 1958)

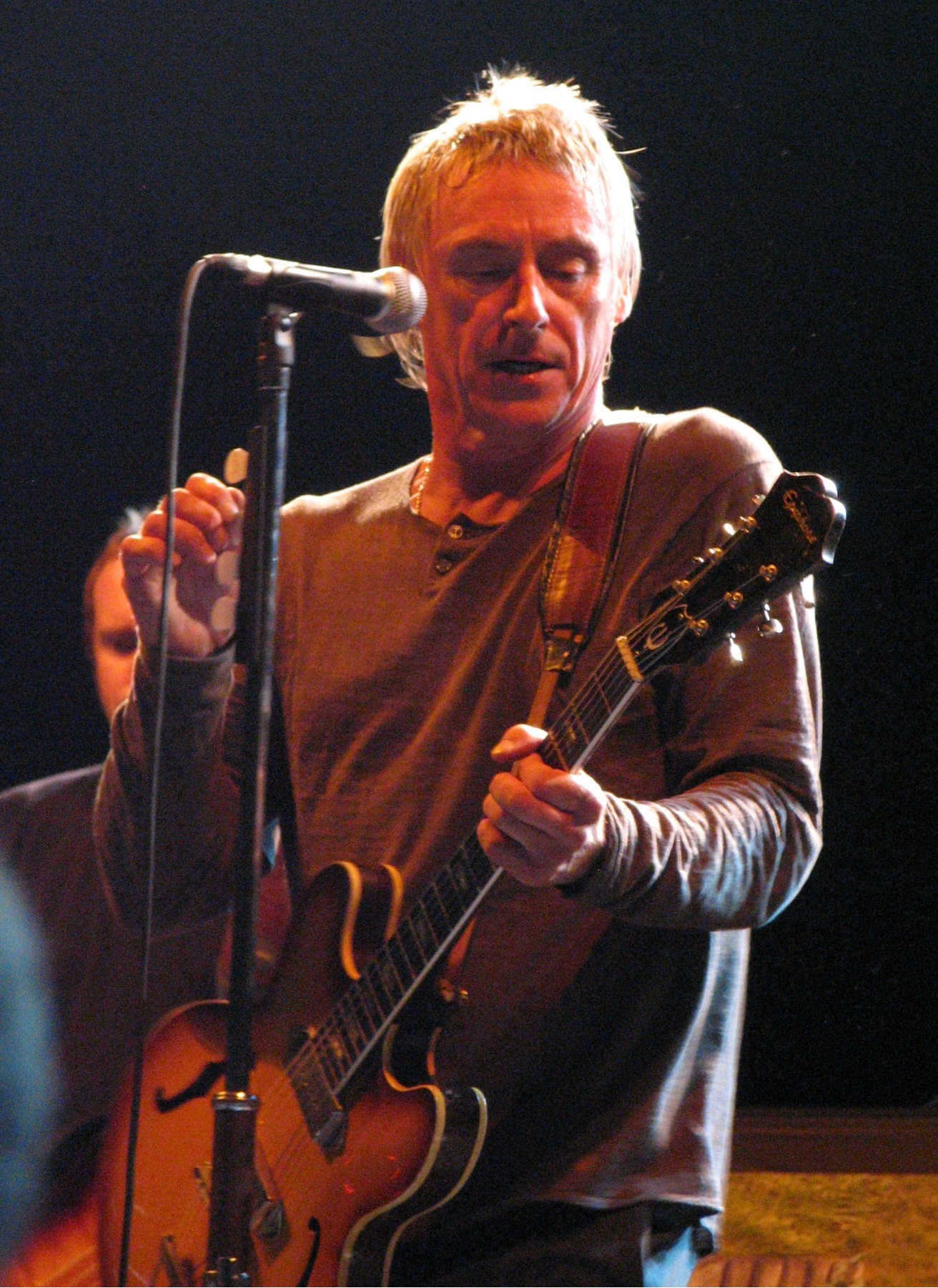
- Weller performing at the Cactus Festival, Bruges, Belgium, 2009

Background information
- Born: John William Weller; 25 May 1958 (age 68); Woking, England
- Genres: New wave; punk rock; mod revival; blue-eyed soul
- Occupations: Singer; songwriter; musician
- Instruments: Vocals; guitar; keyboards; bass; harmonica
- Years active: 1972–present
- Formerly of: The Jam; The Style Council
- Spouses: Dee C. Lee (m. 1987; div. 1998); Hannah Andrews (m. 2010)
- Website: paulweller.com

John William Weller (born 25 May 1958), known as Paul Weller, is an English singer-songwriter and musician. Weller achieved fame in the late 1970s as the guitarist and principal singer and songwriter of the rock band the Jam, alongside Bruce Foxton and Rick Buckler. They gained significant critical and commercial success in the United Kingdom, and were the most influential band of the mod revival of the late 1970s and early 1980s. Following the dissolution of the Jam at the end of 1982, Weller formed the Style Council with Mick Talbot, where he explored a wide variety of other musical styles, including pop, jazz, soul, hip hop, folk and classical. Although initially successful, the band's popularity declined in the late 1980s, leading them to break up in 1989. Weller began a solo career in the early 1990s, slowly re-establishing his commercial standing across his first four solo albums, Paul Weller (1992), Wild Wood (1993), Stanley Road (1995) and Heavy Soul (1997).

Although Weller has received international critical recognition as a singer, lyricist and guitarist, he is most famous in his native country, as his songwriting is rooted in English society. Many of his songs with the Jam had lyrics about working class life. He was the principal figure of the 1970s and 1980s mod revival, often referred to as the Modfather, and an influence on many subsequent British alternative rock and Britpop artists, such as Oasis. He has received four Brit Awards, including Best British Male three times, and the 2006 Brit Award for Outstanding Contribution to Music.

== Early life (1958–1975) ==
Weller was born on 25 May 1958 in Woking, Surrey, to John and Ann Weller (née Craddock). Although born John William Weller, he became known as Paul by his parents.

Weller's father worked as a taxi driver and a builder and his mother was a part-time cleaner. He started his education at Maybury County First School. His love of music began with the Beatles, then the Who and the Small Faces. When Weller was eleven he moved up to Sheerwater County Secondary school and had started playing the guitar.

Weller's musical vocation was confirmed after seeing Status Quo in concert in 1972. He formed the first incarnation of the Jam, playing bass guitar with his school friends Steve Brookes (lead guitar), Dave Waller (rhythm guitar) and Neil Harris (drums), playing sets at school and their local youth club. When Harris and then Waller left the band, two more school friends replaced them: Rick Buckler on drums and Bruce Foxton on rhythm guitar. Weller's father, acting as their manager, began booking the four-piece into local working men's clubs, and the band began to forge a local reputation, playing a mixture of covers and songs written by Weller and Brookes. After Brookes left the band in 1976, Weller and Foxton decided to swap guitar roles, with Weller now the guitarist.

Weller became interested in 1960s mod subculture in late 1974, particularly after hearing "My Generation" by the Who. As a result, he began riding a Lambretta scooter, styling his hair like Steve Marriott and immersing himself in 1960s soul and R&B music. At his instigation, the Jam began wearing mohair suits onstage and he and Foxton began playing Rickenbacker guitars. He has been a committed mod ever since, declaring in a 1991 interview that, "I'll always be a mod. You can bury me a mod".

== The Jam (1976–1982) ==
The Jam emerged at the same time as punk rock bands such as the Clash, the Damned, and the Sex Pistols. The Clash were early advocates of the band, and added them as the support on their White Riot tour in May 1977.

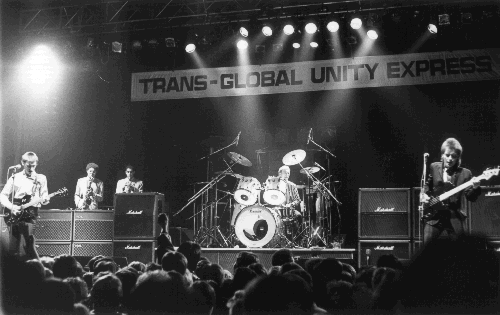
Weller (left) performing with the Jam in Newcastle, April 1982

The Jam's first single, "In the City", took them into the UK Top 40 in May 1977. In 1979, the group released "The Eton Rifles" and first broke into the Top 10, hitting the No. 3 spot in November. The increasing popularity of their blend of Weller's barbed lyrics with pop melodies eventually led to their first number one single, "Going Underground", in March 1980.

The Jam became the first band since the Beatles to perform both sides of the same single ("Town Called Malice" and "Precious") on one edition of Top of the Pops. They also had two singles, "That's Entertainment" (1981) and "Just Who Is the 5 O'Clock Hero?" (1982), reach No. 21 and No. 8 respectively in the UK singles chart despite not being released as singles in the UK—on the strength of import sales of the German single releases. At that time, "That's Entertainment" was the best-selling import-only single to date in the UK charts.

"Before the Jam split up, I just felt it was time for me to move on, just artistically and creatively. I needed to find something different and different kind of avenues to make music, and a different way of making music."

— Weller, reflecting on his decision to end the band, in a 2007 interview with Billboard.

Having already told Buckler and Foxton that he was leaving the band, in October 1982 Weller announced that the Jam would disband at the end of that year. Although Weller was determined to end the band and move on, the action came as a surprise to Foxton and Buckler who both felt that the band had scope to develop further professionally. Their final single, "Beat Surrender", became their fourth UK chart topper, going to No. 1 in its first week. Their farewell concerts at Wembley Arena were multiple sell-outs; their final concert took place at the Brighton Centre on 11 December 1982.

== The Style Council (1983–1989) ==
In 1983, Weller purchased PolyGram's London recording studio where The Jam had previously recorded, and renamed it Solid Bond Studios. The same year, he teamed up with keyboardist Mick Talbot to form a new group called the Style Council. Initially a core duo, augmented by various guest musicians and singers, over time the core grew to also include drummer Steve White and singer Dee C. Lee. Previously a backing vocalist with Wham!, Lee eventually became Weller's girlfriend and then wife.

Free of the limited musical styles he felt imposed by the Jam, under the collective of the Style Council, Weller was able to experiment with a wide range of music, including jazz, blue-eyed soul, and house; he also brought in musicians and vocalists to produce a different sound on each track. The Style Council also used synthesizers and drum machines to create their musical style, which would later be labelled as sophisti-pop.

Many of the Style Council's early singles performed well in the UK charts, and Weller would also experience his first success in North America, when "My Ever Changing Moods" and "You're the Best Thing" entered the US Billboard Hot 100.

Weller appeared on 1984's Band Aid record "Do They Know It's Christmas?", and the Style Council appeared in the British half of Live Aid at Wembley Stadium in 1985.

In December 1984, Weller formed his own charity ensemble called the Council Collective to make a record, "Soul Deep", to raise money for striking miners, and the family of David Wilkie, a Welsh taxi driver who was killed during said strike. The record featured the Style Council and a number of other performers, including Jimmy Ruffin and Junior Giscombe, and peaked at No. 24 on the UK singles chart.

As the 1980s wore on, the Style Council's popularity in the UK began to decline, with the band achieving only one top ten single after 1985. The Style Council's death knell was sounded in 1989 when its record company refused to release its fifth and final studio album, the house-influenced Modernism: A New Decade. With the rejection of this effort, Weller announced that the Style Council had split. It was not until the 1998 retrospective CD box set The Complete Adventures of the Style Council that the album would be widely available.

== Solo career (1990–present) ==
=== Early solo career (1990–1995) ===
By the end of 1989, Weller was without a band or a recording contract for the first time since the age of 17. After taking most of 1990 off, he returned to live performances late that year, touring as the Paul Weller Movement with his longtime friend and drummer Steve White and Paul Francis (a session bassist with the James Taylor Quartet). Initially performing in small clubs, the group played a mixture of songs from The Jam and the Style Council's catalogues alongside new material. Weller released his debut solo single, "Into Tomorrow", in May 1991 which reached No. 36 on the UK Singles Chart. His follow-up, "Uh Huh Oh Yeh", peaked at No. 18 in August 1992, preceding the release of his self-titled debut solo album that September. The album reached No. 8 on the UK Chart.

Following the commercial and critical success of his debut solo album, Weller returned to the studio in 1993 with renewed confidence, recording most of the material for his next album in single takes. Accompanied by Steve White, guitarist Steve Cradock and bassist Marco Nelson, he recorded the Mercury Music Prize-nominated Wild Wood, including the singles "Sunflower" and "Wild Wood". Weller's first solo live album, Live Wood, was released in 1994 and reached No. 13 on the UK Albums Chart.

Weller's third solo studio album Stanley Road (1995) returned him to the top of the UK charts for the first time in a decade and became the best-selling release of his career. Named after the street in Woking where he grew up, the album marked a return to the guitar-oriented sound of his earlier work. Its lead single, "The Changingman", reached No. 7 on the UK Singles Chart, while the ballad "You Do Something to Me" became his second consecutive top 10 single, peaking at No. 9.

Weller became closely associated with the emerging Britpop movement. Noel Gallagher of Oasis is credited as guest guitarist on the Stanley Road track "I Walk on Gilded Splinters". Weller reciprocated by appearing as a guest guitarist on "Champagne Supernova" from Oasis' second studio album (What's the Story) Morning Glory?.

=== The Modfather (1996–2007) ===
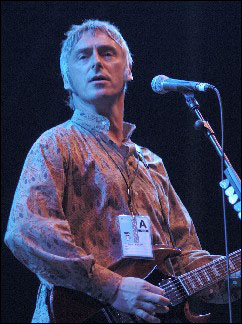
Weller performing in the early 2000s

Heavy Soul, the follow-up to the million-selling Stanley Road, was a 'rootsy', 'stripped-down' change in Weller's musical style, compared to its predecessor. The first single "Peacock Suit" reached No. 5 in the UK Singles Chart, in 1996 and the album reached No. 2 in 1997. Success in the UK charts also came from compilations: The Very Best of The Jam (1997) and the Style Council's Greatest Hits (2000) both went Top 30, and in 1998 his own solo collection, Modern Classics, peaked at No. 7.

In 2000 he released his fifth solo studio album, Heliocentric, which debuted and peaked at No. 2 in the UK Albums Chart. On his worldwide Days of Speed acoustic tour, Weller performed songs from the back catalogue of his solo career and from his Jam and Style Council days, giving rise to a second successful live album of the same name; containing live solo acoustic recordings from the European leg of the tour, the album reached No. 3 in the UK Albums Chart in October 2001.

Weller released the No. 1 hit album Illumination in September 2002. Co-produced by Noonday Underground's Simon Dine, it was preceded by top 10 hit single "It's Written in the Stars". Weller also appears on Noonday Underground's second studio album called Surface Noise (2002), singing on the track "I'll Walk Right On".

In 2002, Weller collaborated with Terry Callier on the single "Brother to Brother", which featured on Callier's ninth studio album Speak Your Peace. That same year, he teamed up with electronic rock duo Death in Vegas on a cover of Gene Clark's "So You Say You Lost Your Baby", which featured on their third studio album Scorpio Rising.

Weller's album of covers titled Studio 150, debuted at No. 2 in the UK charts in 2004, and included Bob Dylan's "All Along the Watchtower" as well as covers of songs by Gil Scott-Heron and Rose Royce, amongst others.

Weller's eighth solo studio album As Is Now (2005) featured the singles "From the Floorboards Up", "Come On/Let's Go" and "Here's the Good News". The album was well-received, reaching No. 4 in the UK charts, though critics noted that he was not moving his music forward stylistically.

At the Brit Awards on 14 February 2006 at Earl's Court in London, he was the latest recipient of the Outstanding Contribution to Music Award. Despite a tendency to shun such occasions, Weller accepted the award in person, and performed four songs at the ceremony, including the Jam's classic "Town Called Malice". Double live album Catch-Flame! was released in June that year, featuring songs from his solo work and his career with the Jam and the Style Council. Compilation album Hit Parade, released in late 2006, collected singles from the Jam, the Style Council and Weller's solo career. Weller was offered appointment as a Commander of the Order of the British Empire in the 2006 birthday honours, but rejected the offer.

In 2007, Weller was a guest vocalist on the song "John Barleycorn" by the folk music project the Imagined Village, with Martin Carthy and Eliza Carthy also being credited as main artists. It was released on the band's eponymous debut studio album.

=== Critical success (2008–present) ===
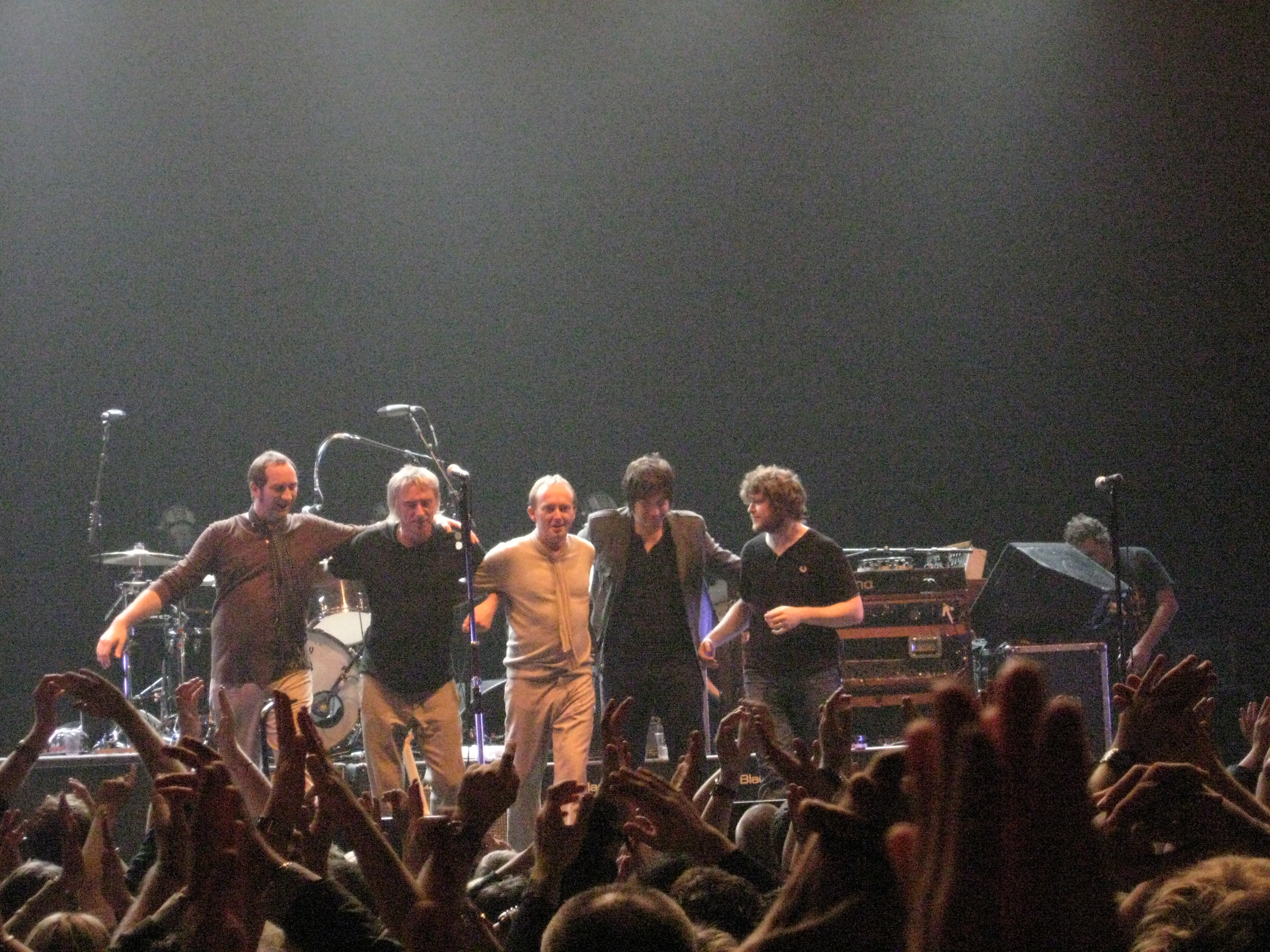
Weller and band line-up in Cardiff, 2008

The double studio album 22 Dreams was released on 2 June 2008, with "Echoes Round the Sun" as the lead single. Weller had parted company with his existing band before the recording this album, replacing everyone except guitarist Steve Cradock with Andy Lewis on bass, Andy Crofts of the Moons on keyboards and Steve Pilgrim of the Stands on drums. This album saw Weller move in a more experimental direction, taking in a wide variety of influences including jazz, folk and tango as well as the pop-soul more associated with his Style Council days. Weller also featured on two songs from the Moons' debut studio album Life on Earth (2010), playing piano on "Wondering" and lead guitar on "Last Night on Earth".

Weller was the surprise recipient of the 2009 Brit Award for British Male Solo Artist, which resulted in controversy when it was discovered that a suspiciously high number of bets had been placed for Weller to win the award, for which James Morrison was T4's favourite. It was reported that the bookmakers had lost £100,000 in the event, and that as a result would not be taking bets for the awards in the future.

In 2009, Weller guested on Dot Allison's fourth studio album, Room 7½ (2009), co-writing "Love's Got Me Crazy". November and December also saw him on tour, playing shows across the country.

On 24 February 2010, Weller received the Godlike Genius Award at the NME Awards. His tenth studio album, Wake Up the Nation, was released in April to critical acclaim, and was subsequently nominated for the Mercury Music Prize. The album also marked his first collaboration with Jam bassist Bruce Foxton in 28 years. In May 2010, Weller was presented with the Ivor Novello Lifetime Achievement award, saying "I've enjoyed the last 33 years I've been writing songs and hopefully, with God's good grace, I'll do some more."

On 19 March 2012 Weller released his eleventh studio album Sonik Kicks. The album entered the UK Albums Chart at number 1. On 17 December 2012 Weller released the Dragonfly EP, a limited edition vinyl run of 3000 copies. Weller provided vocals on the Moons' 2012 single "Something Soon". In December 2012, Weller headlined the Crisis charity gig at the Hammersmith Apollo, where he performed with Emeli Sandé, Miles Kane and Bradley Wiggins. On 23 March 2013, Weller played drums on stage with Damon Albarn, Noel Gallagher and Graham Coxon, playing the Blur track "Tender". This was played as part of the Teenage Cancer Trust concerts curated by Noel Gallagher.

In 2014, Weller wrote "Let Me In" with Olly Murs for Murs's fourth studio album Never Been Better.

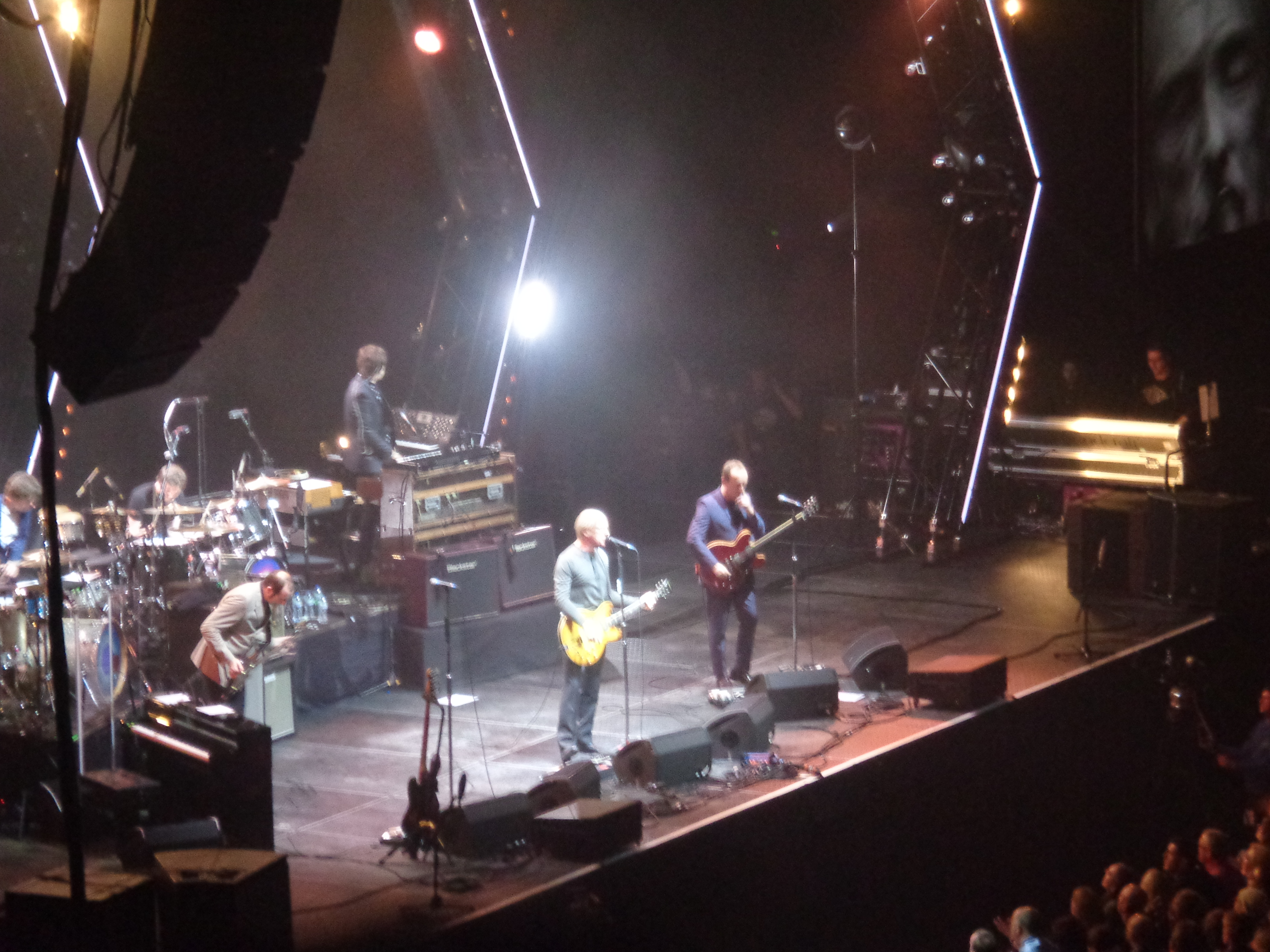
Weller performing at the Leeds Arena in 2015

In 2015, Weller made a West Coast tour of the US to promote his Saturns Pattern studio album. The tour ran from 9 June to 9 October. In January 2017 he made a cameo appearance in "The Final Problem", the final episode of series four of the BBC TV series Sherlock. On 8 March 2019, audio and video versions of Other Aspects, Live at the Royal Festival Hall was released. It is the second of two shows and was recorded in October 2018 at London's Royal Festival Hall with an orchestra.

Weller's fifteenth solo studio album, On Sunset, was released 3 July 2020 and debuted atop the UK Albums Chart, giving Weller UK number-one albums spanning five consecutive decades. He joins the Beatles' John Lennon and Paul McCartney in having the distinction. His number-one albums: The Gift, as part of the Jam (1982). Our Favourite Shop, as part of the Style Council (1985), and solo studio albums Stanley Road (1995), Illumination (2002), 22 Dreams (2008), Sonik Kicks (2012), and On Sunset (2020). Weller's sixteenth solo studio album, Fat Pop (Volume 1), was released to critical acclaim on 14 May 2021, and entered the charts at number 1. On 15 May 2021, Weller recorded live symphonic renditions of songs from his catalogue at the Barbican Centre in London with Jules Buckley and the BBC Symphony Orchestra. A live album of the recording session, An Orchestrated Songbook, was released in December 2021.

On 28 October 2022, Weller released a B-sides and rarities album Will of the People. He collaborated on the songs with Richard Fearless, Young Fathers, Straightface and Stone Foundation.

In early 2024, Weller announced that his next studio album, 66, would be released in May, the day before his 66th birthday. Recording took three years in Weller's Surrey studio, Black Barn. The album includes collaborations with Dr. Robert of the Blow Monkeys, Richard Hawley, Erland Cooper, Max Beesley, Suggs of Madness, Noel Gallagher of Oasis and Noel Gallagher's High Flying Birds, and Bobby Gillespie of Primal Scream, with string arrangements by Hannah Peel. The album's first single, "Soul Wandering", was released on 23 February 2024.

He made his feature film debut in Steve McQueen's historical war drama Blitz, released in 2024.

On 25 July 2025, he released Find El Dorado, a covers album featuring contributions from Noel Gallagher, Robert Plant, Hannah Peel, Declan O'Rourke, Seckou Keita, and Amelia Coburn.

== Influences ==
Weller's formative influences that have remained relatively constant include the Beatles, the Who, the Small Faces and the Kinks, as well as the mid-late 1960s soul and R&B records released by Tamla Motown and Stax.

During the Jam years, Weller was influenced by early punk bands, including the Sex Pistols and the Clash, and later post-punk acts such as Gang of Four and Joy Division. During the final part of the Jam's career, he introduced more contemporary soul and funk into the band's music, with Spandau Ballet's "Chant No. 1 (I Don't Need This Pressure On)" and Pigbag's "Papa's Got a Brand New Pigbag" inspiring Jam tracks, including "Absolute Beginners" and "Precious". Weller's inspiration also came from 1970s soul and funk artists—most notably Curtis Mayfield.

Weller has worked various literary influences into his work, such as George Orwell's work together with a short story written by Weller's friend Dave Waller, providing inspiration for the Jam's fourth studio album Setting Sons (1979). Weller has also cited Geoffrey Ashe's Camelot and the Vision of Albion (1971), Orwell and Percy Bysshe Shelley as sources of inspiration for the Jam's fifth studio album Sound Affects (1980).

Jazz influenced Weller's work during the early Style Council years, and he has cited John Coltrane as one of his favourites, saying "I love all of his stuff from A Love Supreme onwards." His tastes became increasingly eclectic during his Style Council period, with releases influenced by music as diverse as Claude Debussy, Philadelphia soul and Erik Satie, culminating in the band's American house music-inspired album Modernism: A New Decade.

During the 1990s, Weller's work began being influenced by late 1960s and early 1970s artists such as Neil Young, Nick Drake, and Traffic. He has also embraced the influence of David Bowie, despite having once said that all but three of his records were "pish".

Despite telling Mojo magazine in 2000 that he did not "make music with fuzzy radios or electric spoons", since then, he has incorporated experimental influences into his music, citing Pierre Schaeffer and Karlheinz Stockhausen as major influences for On Sunset's experimental tracks. Additionally, Mojo has noted Neu!'s influence on Sonik Kicks' "Green" and "Around the Lake".

Among the many albums that Weller has cited as all-time favourites are Odessey and Oracle (1968), Sgt. Pepper's Lonely Hearts Club Band (1967), What's Going On (1971) , Innervisions (1973), Low (1977), Journey in Satchidananda (1971), The Kinks Are the Village Green Preservation Society (1968), the Small Faces eponymous 1967 album, Traffic's eponymous 1968 album, McCartney (1970), Down by the Jetty (1975), and My Generation (1965). Other songs he has nominated as favourites include the Beatles' "Tomorrow Never Knows" and "Strawberry Fields Forever", the Small Faces' "Tin Soldier", James Brown's "Get Up (I Feel Like Being a) Sex Machine", Declan O'Rourke's "Galileo (Someone Like You)", the Kinks' "Waterloo Sunset" and "Days", and Pharrell Williams' "Happy".

In 2012, Weller invaded a live radio interview with singer-songwriter Gilbert O'Sullivan to praise his songs "Alone Again (Naturally)" and "Nothing Rhymed" as "two of my favourite songs, great lyrics, great tunes".

Weller's favourite film is Stanley Kubrick's A Clockwork Orange (1971).

== Personal life ==
Between the summer of 1977 and around August 1985, Weller was in a relationship with Gill Price, a fashion designer from Bromley. She, and Weller's relationship with her, inspired several Jam songs, including "I Need You (For Someone)", "Aunties & Uncles", "English Rose", "Fly", and "Happy Together". She worked in the Jam's offices, contributed to Weller's fanzines, and frequently toured with them—she can be seen in various behind-the-scenes photos. She appeared on the sleeve of the final Jam single, "Beat Surrender", and along with Weller's sister Nicky, she also had a cameo in the music video for the Style Council's "My Ever Changing Moods".

At the height of the Style Council's success, Weller and Dee C. Lee, the Style Council's backing vocalist, began a romantic relationship. The couple married in 1987 and divorced in 1998. They have a son and a daughter.

Weller has another daughter with make-up artist Lucy Halperin.

Weller became involved with Samantha Stock whilst he was recording at the Manor studio; they had two children together.

In October 2008, Stock and Weller broke up and Weller moved in with Hannah Andrews, a backing vocalist on his 22 Dreams studio album, who has also toured with his band. They first met in New York in 2005 and married in September 2010 on the Italian island of Capri. The couple have twin boys who were born in 2012, and a daughter, born in 2017.

In April 2014, Weller won £10,000 in damages from Associated Newspapers after "plainly voyeuristic" photographs of his family out shopping were published on MailOnline.

On 24 April 2009, John Weller, his father and long-time manager since the days of the Jam, died from pneumonia at the age of 77. His mother Ann Weller died on 15 July 2025.

Weller has been sober since 2010.

=== Political views and activism ===
Weller has a long association with British politics. In the Jam's first NME interview in May 1977, he famously announced that the band would vote for the Conservative Party at the next election, something he has long since stated was a joke.

From late 1980, he became increasingly interested in Campaign for Nuclear Disarmament (CND), often being pictured wearing a CND badge (as in the music video for "Town Called Malice") and playing rallies with both the Jam and the Style Council. In tandem, he became more vocally socialist in interviews, and between around 1982 and 1987, his songwriting also became increasingly politicised, most notably on "Trans-Global Express", "Money-Go-Round", "The Big Boss Groove", "Soul Deep" and the majority of Our Favourite Shop.

In late 1984, Weller took part in Band Aid and then put together his own benefit record for the UK miners' strike, which was called "Soul Deep" and credited to the Council Collective. The 12" of the single featured interviews with striking miners, although half of the money raised went to the widow of David Wilkie, a taxi driver who was killed while driving strike-breaking miners to their shift. During the 1980s, Weller was also vegetarian and concerned with animal rights. As a result, he wrote the song "Bloodsports", which was included on the B-side of the Style Council's 1985 single, "Walls Come Tumbling Down!". Royalties from the track were donated to a defence fund for two hunt saboteurs then on remand in HM Prison Bristol.

From the latter half of 1985, Weller was highly involved in the formation of Red Wedge, a left-wing collective of musicians and actors etc. who aimed to "bring left-wing ideas to other people". From around 1988 onwards, he became less politically vocal, ultimately stating during the 1990s that he no longer particularly believed in any politics.

In 2008, after then-Conservative leader and former Eton pupil David Cameron chose the Jam's "The Eton Rifles" as one of his Desert Island Discs, Weller expressed disgust, saying, "It wasn't intended as a fucking jolly drinking song for the cadet corps." When asked about it again in 2015, he told Mojo magazine: "The whole thing with Cameron saying it was one of his favourite songs ... I just think, 'Which bit didn't you get?" Weller also began playing the song live again for the first time since 1982.

In a 2008 interview, Weller said he had declined a CBE because of his dislike of the royal family, the Establishment and the Civil Service.

During the mid-2010s, Weller made a brief return to the political arena, being vocally supportive of then-Labour Party leader Jeremy Corbyn and playing a 'Concert for Corbyn' in December 2016.

In a Guardian interview in the run-up to the 2024 general election, Weller commented on the British political landscape: "You can either vote for Rishi Sunak's Tory party, or you can vote for Keir Starmer's Tory party." Weller also labelled Sunak, Starmer and Nigel Farage "[m]ugs" and criticised the actions of Israel in the same interview, stating: "Am I against genocides and ethnic cleansing? Yes, I am, funnily enough, I can't understand why more people aren't up in arms about what's going on. We should be ashamed of ourselves, I think. One minute you're supplying bullets and bombs and guns, and then you're sending over food. How does that work?" Weller performed at a fundraising concert for Gaza later in the year.

In 2025, Weller signed an open letter in support of the hip-hop trio Kneecap which opposed a "clear, concerted attempt to censor and ultimately deplatform" the group. Weller was an executive producer of the 2026 Gaza documentary Life Support featuring testimonies from international doctors who had done volunteer work in Gaza hospitals; he also contributed to the film's soundtrack album.

== Recognition and influence ==
In 2007, the BBC described Weller as "one of the most revered music writers and performers of the past 30 years". In 2015, Pete Naughton of The Daily Telegraph wrote, "Apart from David Bowie, it's hard to think of any British solo artist who's had as varied, long-lasting and determinedly forward-looking a career."

In 2012, he was among the British notables selected by the artist Peter Blake to appear in a new version of his most famous artwork—the Beatles' Sgt. Pepper's Lonely Hearts Club Band album cover—to celebrate the British social figures of his life.

== Discography ==
Studio albums

- Paul Weller (1992)
- Wild Wood (1993)
- Stanley Road (1995)
- Heavy Soul (1997)
- Heliocentric (2000)
- Illumination (2002)
- Studio 150 (2004)
- As Is Now (2005)
- 22 Dreams (2008)
- Wake Up the Nation (2010)
- Sonik Kicks (2012)
- Saturns Pattern (2015)
- A Kind Revolution (2017)
- True Meanings (2018)
- On Sunset (2020)
- Fat Pop (Volume 1) (2021)
- 66 (2024)
- Find El Dorado (2025)
