= Brendan Lynch (music producer) =

British music producer

Brendan Lynch is a London-based music producer, who has produced for Paul Weller, Primal Scream and Ocean Colour Scene. He has also worked with the 22-20s, Carleen Anderson, Pete and the Pirates and Le Volume Courbe.

He worked on The Help Album which involved Paul McCartney, Noel Gallagher, Paul Weller and Johnny Depp, amongst many others.

Lynch was part of Indian Vibes, a collaboration with Weller, Marco Nelson, and Crispin Taylor (of Galliano), who had a hit in France with the psychedelic dance track "Mathar". Lynch remixed "Champagne Supernova" by Oasis which was the band's first remix. He has also remixed tracks for Massive Attack, Air, Young Disciples, Dr John, Anthony Johnson and Temples. He was also a member of Paul Weller's touring band.

He was sound designer for exhibition Buffet d'art at Meinblau Projektraum, Berlin 2015 and Ambika P3, London in November 2016.

He is one-half of 'Society' whose debut album was released on Virgin records.
