= In Another Room =

EP by Paul Weller
- Released: 31 January 2020
- Genre: Musique concrète; sound collage; experimental; hauntology; electronic; field recordings
- Length: 7:34
- Label: Ghost Box
- Producer: Paul Weller

Paul Weller chronology
True Meanings (2018)	In Another Room (2020)	On Sunset (2020)

In Another Room is an EP by English musician Paul Weller, released in January 2020 by electronic label Ghost Box. The label approached Weller to record a release for them, the musician having already taken influence from the label's music on previous releases. Recorded with longtime engineer Charles Rees, the project allowed Weller to create more outré music and explore his passions for tape music and electronics.

The EP contains four instrumentals and is a work of musique concrète, sound collage and experimental music, based on field recordings that Weller captured during his travels and everyday life. Tape manipulation was employed to give the project an analogue feel and change the speed of recordings. The record has also been considered a work of hauntology, a genre pioneered by Ghost Box.

In Another Room was a limited edition of 1,000 vinyl copies, although it was also available as a download. Critics contextualised the record as continuing Weller's more adventurous 2010s work. The musician later reused elements of the EP on his subsequent album On Sunset (2020).

== Background and recording ==
Paul Weller had long been a fan of electronic label Ghost Box, and their influence on his music was apparent in eccentric recordings such as "Night Lights" from 22 Dreams (2008) and the lengthy sound collage "Jimmy/Blackout" from the Jawbone soundtrack (2017). The genesis of In Another Room came when Ghost Box founder Jim Jupp approached Weller to record material for the label; Jupp, who was surprised that Weller was a fan of Ghost Box, only infrequently followed his career until Saturns Pattern (2015) re-energised his interest; he said of the album: "I realised just how wide ranging his influences had become. It goes without saying what an incredible songwriter he is but, I love the way he weaves in his love of English folk and vintage electronics as well as the more obvious influences." Weller considered it "[a] great honour to be asked to do it as a fan of the label." Paul Osborne of Shindig! wrote that Ghost Box was the ideal label for Weller to explore "his love of experimental tape music and electronics", and provided him with the opportunity "to visit the more outrè corners of the musical spectrum."

Weller commented that once he knew Ghost Box were interested in a release, he began storing up ideas, later resulting in a wealth of sounds on the EP that were recorded from his iPhone. Early discussions between Weller and Jupp helped formalise some of the musician's ideas as well as "providing fresh inspiration", according to Jupp, who added that Weller sent him his Jawbone soundtrack album for "a flavour of what kind of instrumental work [the release] might be.". Jupp suggested the work result in a seven-inch single or EP, with no particular deadline attached, thus allowing Weller to "do something a bit more out there, which was certainly fine by us!"

The EP was created by Weller with long-time engineer Charles Rees, utilising field recordings "captured during [Weller's] travels and day to day life." The musician wrote, arranged, produced the EP and played most of its instrumentation, with Rees also credited for recording, mixing and production management. According to Rees, the principle of the recording "was whatever you were thinking, you could record and them manipulate it." To this end, tape manipulation was employed on the tracks to provide them with analogue atmosphere. Weller said: "We used the half-inch tape and put some sounds back onto that and fucked about with them and slowed them down or whatever." Besides Weller, other musicians on the album include Rees, who played Moog synthesiser on "Rejoice"; Tom Van Heel, who played Moog on the title track and "Submerge", as well as "prayer bowl" percussion on the latter and drums, vocals and glockenspiel on "Rejoice", and Jan Erika, whose cello work appears on "Submerge".

== Composition ==
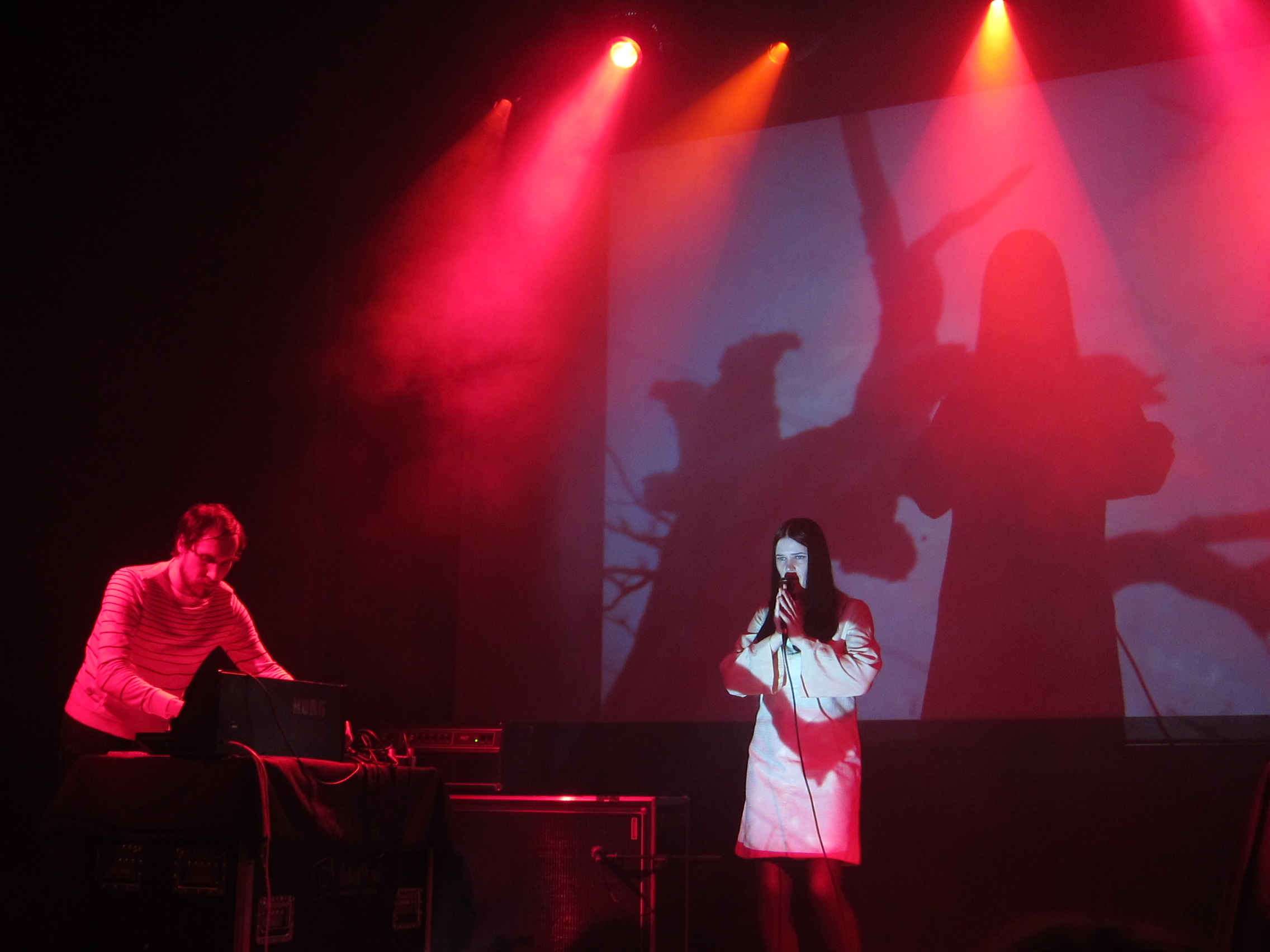
In Another Room was influenced by Broadcast (pictured 2010).

Containing four instrumental tracks, In Another Room has been referred to as a work of musique concrète, sound collage, experimental, and electronic music. Pat Gilbert of Mojo Essentials describes the contents as "four tracks of eerie field recordings and musique concrète". Kitty Empire wrote that while Weller had "dabbled in all sorts of outre soundmaking" since 22 Dreams (2008), with albums "as varied as they were regular", the musique concrète EP is arguably the "strangest of all". Osborne says that while the EP fits firmly into the musique concrète tradition, it features "subtle melodic undertones", and felt that the project's existence would not surprise those who had kept up with ten years of Weller's "sonic shape-shifting". In Another Room was partly influenced by Broadcast, whom Weller had long championed in interviews, and has drawn comparison to Delia Derbyshire, and Julian House's work with the Focus Group. Jupp compared the music to "a late Beatles studio experiment."

According to Mojo, the record is characterised by "spectral piano parts, white noise, doomy 'dongs', faraway voices and field recordings of birdsong and running water". Weller said of the EP: "Obviously a lot of it's random by the very nature of it but then there's an overall theme to it as well." The EP's sound collages and experiments exemplify the hauntology genre pioneered by Ghost Box, described as "atmospheric, often avant-garde electronic sounds that evoke buried shared cultural memories." Mojo consider the release to fit the label's "rubric of 'hauntology' impeccably." Clash consider In Another Room to showcase "sheer acid England, a kind of weird walk around the environs of [Weller's] native Woking", and noted the music's "fleeting glimpses, and a general sense of the uncanny [in its] grapples with a shadow England." They added that the release moves the songwriter's vision of the country from a bucolic to a radically dystopian one "with the twist of a dial", while adding a wry edge to his work by displaying "the rather more nostalgic side of the English hypnagogia espoused by some aspects of the folk horror guild."

According to Clash, the title track evokes "a fracture kind of pastoral landscape", with "wonky analogue electronics intruded upon by found-sounds." The bells on the track were recorded by Weller on a visit to Rishikesh. "Submerge" features deft effects, while "Embarkation" originated during the Jawbone soundtrack sessions; Weller said it "didn't work out so I managed to be able to re-do [the track]."

== Release and reception ==
Professional ratings
Review scores
Source	Rating
Clash	7/10

On 25 October 2019, Ghost Box announced In Another Room for a late January 2020 release, with previews and pre-orders would becoming available from December. Issued as a gatefold seven-inch record, the EP was limited to 1,000 copies and features artwork from Julian House. It was also released as a download on FLAC and MP3 formats.

In their review, Mojo wrote that while the idea of Weller "releasing an EP of eerie musique concrete" may have seemed highly unlikely a decade or so earlier, 2010s albums such as Sonik Kicks (2012) and Saturns Pattern (2015) had "acclimatised fans to the Modfather's increasingly experimental mindset," which reaches "an apogee" on In Another Room. They drew attention to the music's effective hauntology sound. Alexis Petridis of The Guardian similarly noted: "It's worth considering for a moment how unlikely the idea of Paul Weller releasing an EP of musique concrète experimentation on a leftfield electronic label would once have seemed. The results are appealingly eerie."

A reviewer for Clash wrote that throughout the 21st century, Weller had contrasted his 'Modfather' image with some of his most daring material, considering A Different Room to continue this dynamic. They deemed the EP "far from perfect", writing of "a sense of Weller shifting palettes – embracing a slightly uncomfortable mirror of a 1973 dreamscape he once rebelled against – but still working within rules". Despite this, they considered the record "supremely interesting" as an opportunity to hear the musician release "such, well, un-Weller music". They concluded: "An experiment with mixed results, In Another [Room] proves to have an illuminating impact that outshines much of the music underneath." In their review, Shindig! described the EP as a "visionary release".

== Legacy ==
Weller later used some of the sound clips from In Another Room on his next album On Sunset (2020), most notably on its opening song "Mirror Ball". Pat Carty of Hot Press wrote that while the EP may have baffled Weller's fans, it acted as a "signpost" of his change of direction, noting that the musique concrète breakdown in "Mirror Ball" continues the musician's experimentation. Similarly, Peter Watts of Uncut noted that Weller's experience making the hauntological EP "found its way into On Sunset", while NME writer Mark Beaumont wrote that with On Sunset, Weller merges the "avant-garde montage methods" of musique concrète from In Another Room with "a rich seam of classic '70s funk, lounge and sci-fi soul. The album also continued Weller's collaboration with Jupp, as the pair wrote the futuristic R&B song "Earth Beat" together.

== Track listing ==
All songs written by Paul Weller.

=== Side one ===
1. "In Another Room" – 1:43
2. "Submerge" – 2:18

=== Side two ===
3. "Embarkation" – 1:55
4. "Rejoice" – 1:36

== Personnel ==
Adapted from the liner notes of In Another Room

- Paul Weller – instrumentation, arrangements, production, writer
- Charles Rees – recording, mixing, production manager, Moog synthesiser ("Rejoice")
- Julian House – cover design
- Tom Van Heel – Moog synthesiser ("In Another Room" and "Submerge"), prayer bowl ("Submerge"), glockenspiel ("Rejoice"), vocals ("Rejoice"), drums ("Rejoice")
- Jan Erika – cello ("Rejoice")
