= Hannah Peel =

British musician (born 1985)

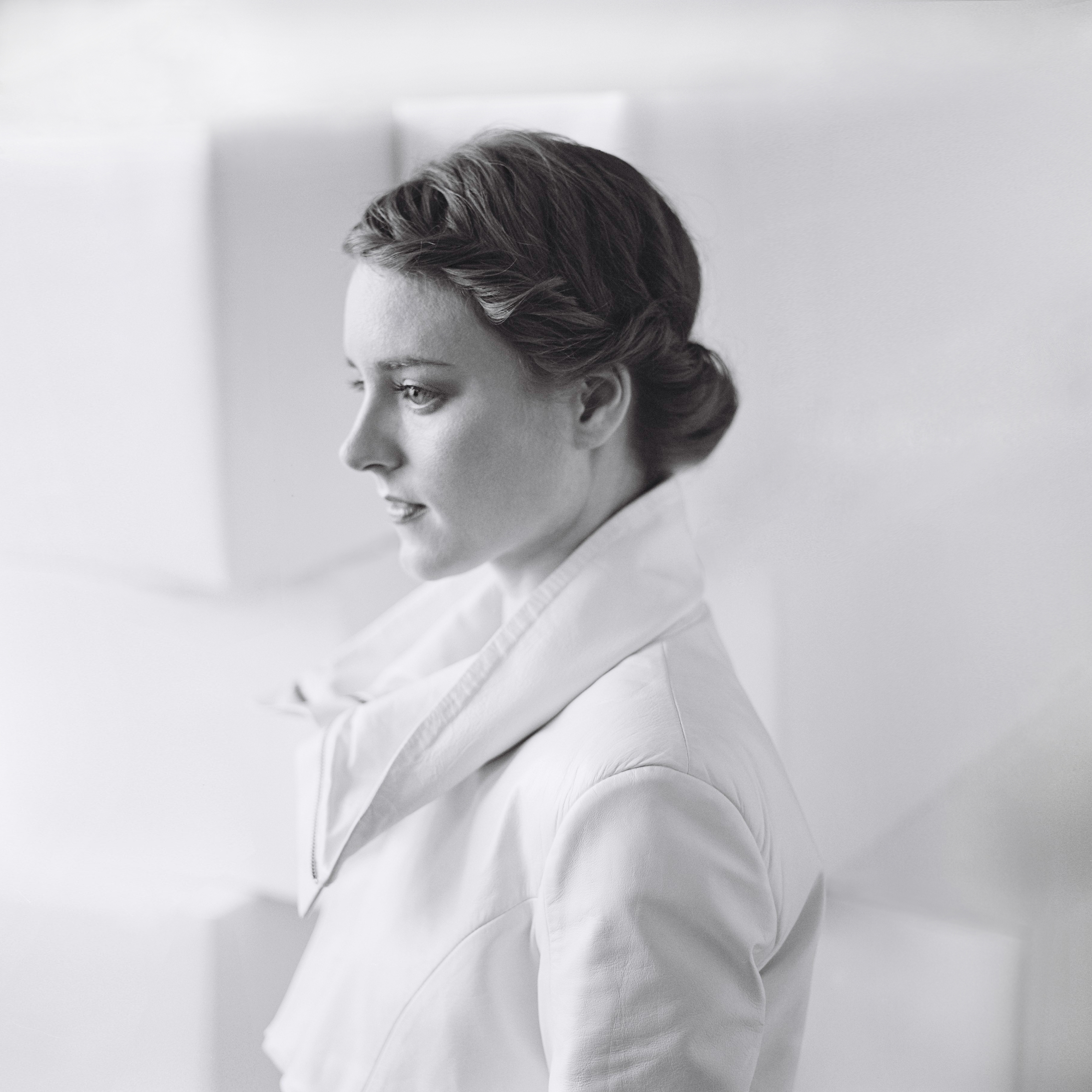
- Peel in 2013

Background information
- Born: Hannah Mary Peel; 27 August 1985 (age 41); Craigavon, Northern Ireland
- Genres: Soundtracks; Electronic; Classical; synth-pop
- Occupations: Singer-songwriter; composer; arranger; instrumentalist
- Instruments: Piano; Synthesiser; Vocals; Violin; Trombone; Music Box
- Labels: My Own Pleasure; Realworld Records; Domino; Static Caravan; Full Time Hobby; Rivertones; Mute Song
- Website: hannahpeel.com

Hannah Mary Peel (born 27 August 1985) is a British Ivor Novello award-winning composer, producer and broadcaster. Her solo music is primarily electronic, synthesiser-based and often includes classical scoring and sound design, with references to the links between science, nature and music. She has scored music for television, film, theatre and dance, including her Emmy-nominated score to the documentary Game of Thrones: The Last Watch, and the British science fiction TV series The Midwich Cuckoos which won Peel an Ivor Novello award in 2023.

Peel releases her solo records on her own imprint label, My Own Pleasure Records. This includes her 2021 Mercury Music Prize nominated Fir Wave, Awake But Always Dreaming, and Mary Casio: Journey to Cassiopeia.

Peel has been a regular weekly broadcaster on BBC Radio 3's Night Tracks since 2019.

Aside from her solo work, she has worked with collaborators on projects including orchestrations and conducting for Paul Weller, an album written for the British Paraorchestra, an album with the poet Will Burns, and as a member of the psychogeography indie rock group The Magnetic North and the electronic music group John Foxx and the Maths.

== Early life ==
Peel was born in Craigavon, Northern Ireland, on 27 August 1985. When she was eight years old, her family moved to Barnsley in South Yorkshire. Her father was an amateur folk musician, and she joined him in musical gatherings, including holidays in County Donegal, Republic of Ireland. She enrolled in the Liverpool Institute for Performing Arts at the age of 18. There, she studied violin, trombone and piano.

== Music career ==
After graduation from LIPA, Peel stayed in Liverpool as a session musician, recording and playing live for various artists including David Ford, Laura Groves and The Unthanks. In 2007, Peel musically directed King Cotton starring John Henshaw, Israel Oyelumade, Paul Anderson and Cornelius Macarthy. The play opened at The Lowry, Salford, United Kingdom, on 12 September 2007, before moving to the Liverpool Empire Theatre from 25 September 2007.

In 2008, Peel was awarded a grant from the Liverpool Capital of Culture to curate and produce a large scale audio visual festival called AV08. It featured commissioned collaborations from artists from New York, London and Liverpool utilising large scale projections onto the Mersey Tunnel Air Vent.

In 2009 Peel released her first EP Rebox on vinyl with Static Caravan. The record featured remixes of famous 80's pop songs, remixed onto a whole punched music box and sung by Peel. The record sold out and has since been used in TV shows as American Horror Story.

Peel moved to London in 2010 to record her debut album The Broken Wave with Mike Lindsay of Tunng. During touring of the album she joined The Magnetic North who released albums in 2012 and 2016 on Full Time Hobby. Peel continued to work as a session musician, solo artist and composer during this time.

Her solo albums include: Mary Casio: Journey to Cassiopeia, written for colliery brass band and synthesiser; Awake But Always Dreaming, written after witnessing her grandmother's descent into Alzheimer's disease; and her 2021 Mercury-nominated album Fir Wave.

In 2018, Peel arranged strings and woodwind for Paul Weller's 2018 album True Meanings. Following the release, Peel orchestrated and conducted an orchestra for Weller's 2019 live album Other Aspects: Live at the Royal Festival Hall which featured songs from True Meanings and track by The Jam and The Style Council and from Weller's solo material. She has also orchestrated and conducted for his subsequent records On Sunset, Fat Pop and 66.

In late 2017, Peel was commissioned by British filmmaker Jeanie Finlay to score her first feature-length documentary film, Game of Thrones: The Last Watch. For her score, Peel was nominated for Outstanding Music Composition for a Documentary Series at the Primetime Emmy Awards. Since then, Peel has gone on to score multiple TV shows and films full time.

=== Radio presenter ===
Since 2019, Peel has been a weekly presenter on the BBC Radio 3 show Night Tracks. In 2019, she was a guest presenter on BBC 6 Music, filling in for Elbow's Guy Garvey. Peel has also presented specialist music series Unfinished Symphony for BBC Radio Ulster and in 2024, her first Night Tracks Prom at the BBC Proms.

== Discography ==
=== Albums ===
==== Solo ====
- 2011: The Broken Wave (Static Caravan)
- 2016: Awake but Always Dreaming (My Own Pleasure)
- 2017: Mary Casio: Journey to Cassiopeia (My Own Pleasure)
- 2018: Particles in Space (My Own Pleasure)
- 2019: Chalk Hill Blue (Rivertones)
- 2019: Game Of Thrones: The Last Watch OST(HBO)
- 2020: The Deceived OST (Silva Screen Records)
- 2021: Fir Wave (My Own Pleasure)
- 2021: Unheard Delia (My Own Pleasure)
- 2022: The Unfolding, featuring the Paraorchestra and Victoria Otuwari (Real World Records)
- 2022: Rogue Agent, OST (Universal Music)
- 2022: The Midwich Cuckoos, OST (Invada Records)
- 2023: Dancing At Lughnasa, OST (Broadway Records and National Theatre)
- 2024: Scoop, OST (Netflix music)
- 2024: Insomnia, OST (Madison Gate Records)

==== With Beyond the Wizards Sleeve ====
- 2016: The Soft Bounce (Phantasy)

==== With Philippe Cohen Solal and Mike Lindsay (Tunng) ====
- 2021: Outsider (Ya Basta! Records)

==== With John Foxx and the Maths ====
- 2013: Rhapsody (Metamatic Records)
- 2020: Howl (Metamatic Records)

==== With The Magnetic North ====
- 2012: Orkney: Symphony of The Magnetic North (Full Time Hobby)
- 2016: Prospect of Skelmersdale (Full Time Hobby)

==== With Manchester Collective ====
- 2023: Neon (Bedroom Community)

==== With Beibei Wang ====
- 2026: The Endless Dance (Real World Records)

=== EPs ===
==== Solo ====
- 2010: Rebox (Static Caravan)
- 2013: Nailhouse (Mitchum Submarine)
- 2014: Fabricstate (My Own Pleasure)
- 2015: Rebox 2 (My Own Pleasure)

==== Collaborations ====
With Philippe Cohen Solal and Mike Lindsay (Tunng)

- 2015: Henry J. Darger (Ya! Basta Records)

=== Singles ===
==== Solo ====
- 2021: Horizon (Deutsche Grammophon)

=== Performance / writing credits ===
Year	Release title	Artist(s)	Notes, role	Label
2004	The Fake Death Experience	28 Costumes	Brass	Spank Records
2006	Smile... It Confuses People	Sandi Thom	Trombone, violin	RCA Records
2010	Let the Hard Times Roll	David Ford	Trombone, Violin	The Magnolia Label
2010	History of Modern	Orchestral Manoeuvres in the Dark|	Organ, vocals (background)	Bright Antenna
2010	Fire Like This	Blood Red Shoes	Violin	V2 Records
2010	In Modern History	Jim Moray	Vocals on "Jenny of the Moor"	NIAG Records
2011	Last Days of Meaning	Nitin Sawhney	Vocals and the remix (rebox)	Positiv ID
2013	Charge	David Ford	Violin	Razor and Tie
2014	Closing Time	Erland and the Carnival	Writer	Full Time Hobby
2014	Morning	Rhodes	Trombone, violin	Rhodes Music
2015	Wishes	Rhodes	Trombone, violin	Rhodes Music
2015	Culture of Volume	East India Youth	Violin, string arrangements	XL Recordings
2016	"Diagram Girl"	Beyond the Wizards Sleeve	Vocals	Phantasy
2016	"Creation"	Beyond the Wizards Sleeve	Vocals	Phantasy
2016	"The Soft Bounce"	Beyond the Wizards Sleeve	Vocals	Phantasy
2018	LUMP	LUMP	Trombone	Dead Oceans
2017	A Kind Revolution (deluxe edition)	Paul Weller	Strings on Remix "Wo See Mama"	Parlophone
2018	True Meanings	Paul Weller	Orchestral Arrangements/Conducting/Performer	Parlophone
2019	Other Aspects: Live at The Royal Festival Hall	Paul Weller	Orchestral Arrangements/Conducting/Performer	Parlophone
2020	On Sunset	Paul Weller	Orchestral Arrangements/Conducting	Polydor Records
2020	Set it Loose	Hayden Thorpe	Violin	Domino Recording Company
2021	Fat Pop (Volume 1)	Paul Weller	Orchestral Arrangements/Conducting	Polydor Records
2021	Arrivals	Declan O'Rourke	String arrangements	Warner Music
2021	Heart Shaped Scars	Dot Allison	String arrangements	SA Recordings
2021	Absent Origin	Mira Calix	Vocals	Warp Records
2022	LYS	Mari Samuelsen	Composition and electronics/synthesisers on two tracks	Deutsche Grammophon
2023	66	Paul Weller	Orchestral Arrangements/Conducting	Polydor Records
2023	Conciousology	Dot Allison	String arrangements	Sonic Cathedral

=== Scores ===
- 2011: TeZukA by Sidi Larbi Cherkaoui – several tracks using hand-punched music
- 2012: Compass (Sadler's Wells Theatre) – Full score
- 2012: Anna Karenina soundtrack – several tracks
- 2013: Dates – title music
- 2016: Santa Forgot – Alzheimer's Research UK and Aardman Animations – Full score
- 2018: Brighton Rock - Pilot Theatre - Full live theatre score
- 2018: Ice Alive - National Geographic - Full score
- 2018: Kiss Me First – Channel 4 / Netflix – title music and additional scoring
- 2018: The A List – BBC – title music
- 2019: Game of Thrones: The Last Watch OST (TV Special Documentary) – Full score
- 2019: Cold War Letters - London Calling – BBC 4 - Full score
- 2020: Close - Irish National Opera - Score
- 2020: The Deceived – Channel 5 - Full score
- 2020: Lee Miller: Life On The Frontline – BBC 2 - Full score
- 2021: Greenpeace: Act Now - Full score
- 2021: Anti-body - Alexander Whitely Dance Company - Full score
- 2021: This Cultural Life - Radio 4 (ongoing) - Full score
- 2022: Rogue Agent - Netflix - Full Score
- 2022: The Midwich Cuckoos - SKY Max - Full score
- 2023: Dancing At Lughnasa - Royal National Theatre - Full score
- 2023: Silent Roar - Film - Full score
- 2024: Scoop - Netflix - Full score
- 2024: Insomnia - Paramount Plus - Full score
- 2024: Bring Them Down - Film - Full score
