= List of artists who topped the UK Albums Chart in four or more decades =

The UK Albums Chart is a weekly record chart compiled by the Official Charts Company, which for most of its history was based on album sales from Sunday to Saturday in the United Kingdom. The chart was founded in 1956, compiling physical format album sales until 2007, after which it has included albums sold digitally. Since March 2015, it has incorporated music streaming service data. From 10 July 2015, it has been based on a Friday to Thursday album sales.

This list shows the twenty-eight artists who have topped the UK Albums Chart, in four or more decades. The Rolling Stones have topped the albums chart in the most decades, with six. Bruce Springsteen, Kylie Minogue, Michael Jackson and Madonna are the only artists to score a number one album in five consecutive decades, all doing so from the 1980s to the 2020s.

== Tally ==
=== Six decades ===
Artists who reached the number one in the UK Albums Chart in six decades
| Artist | Number one album | Decade(s) it reached number one | Ref. |
|---|---|---|---|
| The Rolling Stones | The Rolling Stones | 1960s | |
| The Rolling Stones | The Rolling Stones No. 2 | 1960s | |
| The Rolling Stones | Aftermath | 1960s | |
| The Rolling Stones | Let It Bleed | 1960s | |
| The Rolling Stones | Get Yer Ya-Ya's Out! | 1970s | |
| The Rolling Stones | Sticky Fingers | 1970s | |
| The Rolling Stones | Exile on Main St. | 1970s | |
| The Rolling Stones | Goats Head Soup | 1970s | |
| The Rolling Stones | Emotional Rescue | 1980s | |
| The Rolling Stones | Voodoo Lounge | 1990s | |
| The Rolling Stones | Exile on Main St. (Note: Re-issue) | 2010s | |
| The Rolling Stones | Blue & Lonesome | 2010s | |
| The Rolling Stones | Goats Head Soup | 2020s | |
| The Rolling Stones | Hackney Diamonds | 2020s | |
| The Rolling Stones | Foreign Tongues | 2020s | |

=== Five decades ===
Artists who reached the number one in the UK Albums Chart in five decades
| Artist | Number one album | Decade(s) it reached number one | Ref. |
|---|---|---|---|
| ABBA | Greatest Hits | 1970s | |
| ABBA | Arrival | 1970s | |
| ABBA | ABBA: The Album | 1970s | |
| ABBA | Voulez-Vous | 1970s | |
| ABBA | Greatest Hits Vol. 2 | 1970s | |
| ABBA | Super Trouper | 1980s | |
| ABBA | The Visitors | 1980s | |
| ABBA | The Singles: The First Ten Years | 1980s | |
| ABBA | ABBA Gold | 1990s | |
| ABBA | ABBA Gold | 2000s | |
| ABBA | Voyage | 2020s | |
| The Beatles | Please Please Me | 1960s | |
| The Beatles | With the Beatles | 1960s | |
| The Beatles | A Hard Day's Night | 1960s | |
| The Beatles | Beatles for Sale | 1960s | |
| The Beatles | Help! | 1960s | |
| The Beatles | Rubber Soul | 1960s | |
| The Beatles | Revolver | 1960s | |
| The Beatles | Sgt. Pepper's Lonely Hearts Club Band | 1960s | |
| The Beatles | The Beatles | 1960s | |
| The Beatles | Abbey Road | 1960s | |
| The Beatles | Let It Be | 1970s | |
| The Beatles | The Beatles at the Hollywood Bowl | 1970s | |
| The Beatles | Live at the BBC | 1990s | |
| The Beatles | Anthology 2 | 1990s | |
| The Beatles | 1 | 2000s | |
| The Beatles | Sgt. Pepper's Lonely Hearts Club Band: 50th Anniversary Edition | 2010s | |
| The Beatles | Abbey Road: 50th Anniversary Edition | 2010s | |
| Bob Dylan | The Freewheelin' Bob Dylan | 1960s | |
| Bob Dylan | Bringing It All Back Home | 1960s | |
| Bob Dylan | John Wesley Harding | 1960s | |
| Bob Dylan | Nashville Skyline | 1960s | |
| Bob Dylan | Self Portrait | 1970s | |
| Bob Dylan | New Morning | 1970s | |
| Bob Dylan | Together Through Life | 2000s | |
| Bob Dylan | Shadows in the Night | 2010s | |
| Bob Dylan | Rough and Rowdy Ways | 2020s | |
| Michael Jackson | Thriller | 1980s | |
| Michael Jackson | 18 Greatest Hits (Note: The album is credited to Michael Jackson Plus The Jackson 5) | 1980s | |
| Michael Jackson | Bad | 1980s | |
| Michael Jackson | Dangerous | 1990s | |
| Michael Jackson | HIStory: Past, Present and Future, Book I | 1990s | |
| Michael Jackson | Blood on the Dance Floor: HIStory in the Mix | 1990s | |
| Michael Jackson | Invincible | 2000s | |
| Michael Jackson | Number Ones | 2000s | |
| Michael Jackson | The Essential Michael Jackson | 2000s | |
| Michael Jackson | Xscape | 2010s | |
| Michael Jackson | The Essential Michael Jackson (Note: Originally released in 2005) | 2020s | |
| Tom Jones | Delilah | 1960s | |
| Tom Jones | 20 Greatest Hits | 1970s | |
| Tom Jones | Reload | 1990s, 2000s | |
| Tom Jones | Surrounded by Time | 2020s | |
| Madonna | Like a Virgin | 1980s | |
| Madonna | True Blue | 1980s | |
| Madonna | Like a Prayer | 1980s | |
| Madonna | The Immaculate Collection | 1990s | |
| Madonna | Evita (Note: The album is also credited to Madonna & various artists) | 1990s | |
| Madonna | Ray of Light | 1990s | |
| Madonna | Music | 2000s | |
| Madonna | American Life | 2000s | |
| Madonna | Confessions on a Dance Floor | 2000s | |
| Madonna | Hard Candy | 2000s | |
| Madonna | Celebration | 2000s | |
| Madonna | MDNA | 2010s | |
| Madonna | Confessions II | 2020s | |
| Kylie Minogue | Kylie | 1980s | |
| Kylie Minogue | Enjoy Yourself | 1980s | |
| Kylie Minogue | Greatest Hits | 1990s | |
| Kylie Minogue | Fever | 2000s | |
| Kylie Minogue | Aphrodite | 2010s | |
| Kylie Minogue | Golden | 2010s | |
| Kylie Minogue | Step Back in Time: The Definitive Collection | 2010s | |
| Kylie Minogue | Disco | 2020s | |
| Kylie Minogue | Tension | 2020s | |
| Kylie Minogue | Tension II | 2020s | |
| Kylie Minogue | Kylie Christmas (Fully Wrapped) | 2020s | |
| Pink Floyd | Atom Heart Mother | 1970s | |
| Pink Floyd | Wish You Were Here | 1970s | |
| Pink Floyd | The Final Cut | 1980s | |
| Pink Floyd | The Division Bell | 1990s | |
| Pink Floyd | Pulse | 1990s | |
| Pink Floyd | The Endless River | 2010s | |
| Pink Floyd | Pink Floyd at Pompeii – MCMLXXII | 2020s | |
| Pink Floyd | Wish You Were Here | 2020s | |
| Elvis Presley | Rock 'N' Roll | 1950s | |
| Elvis Presley | Loving You | 1950s | |
| Elvis Presley | King Creole | 1950s | |
| Elvis Presley | Elvis Is Back! | 1960s | |
| Elvis Presley | G.I. Blues | 1960s | |
| Elvis Presley | Blue Hawaii | 1960s | |
| Elvis Presley | Pot Luck | 1960s | |
| Elvis Presley | From Elvis in Memphis | 1960s | |
| Elvis Presley | Elvis' 40 Greatest | 1970s | |
| Elvis Presley | ELV1S: 30 No. 1 Hits | 2000s | |
| Elvis Presley | The King | 2000s | |
| Elvis Presley | If I Can Dream (Note: The album is credited to Elvis Presley with the Royal Philharmonic Orchestra) | 2010s | |
| Elvis Presley | The Wonder of You (Note: The album is credited to Elvis Presley with the Royal Philharmonic Orchestra) | 2010s | |
| Bruce Springsteen | Born in the U.S.A. | 1980s | |
| Bruce Springsteen | Tunnel of Love | 1980s | |
| Bruce Springsteen | Human Touch | 1990s | |
| Bruce Springsteen | Greatest Hits | 1990s | |
| Bruce Springsteen | The Rising | 2000s | |
| Bruce Springsteen | Devils & Dust | 2000s | |
| Bruce Springsteen | Magic | 2000s | |
| Bruce Springsteen | Working on a Dream | 2000s | |
| Bruce Springsteen | Wrecking Ball | 2010s | |
| Bruce Springsteen | High Hopes | 2010s | |
| Bruce Springsteen | Western Stars | 2010s | |
| Bruce Springsteen | Letter to You | 2020s | |

=== Four decades ===
Artists who reached the number one in the UK Albums Chart in four decades
| Artist | Number one album | Decade(s) it reached number one | Ref. |
|---|---|---|---|
| AC/DC | Back in Black | 1980s | |
| AC/DC | Black Ice | 2000s | |
| AC/DC | Iron Man 2 | 2010s | |
| AC/DC | Power Up | 2020s | |
| Blur | Parklife | 1990s | |
| Blur | The Great Escape | 1990s | |
| Blur | Blur | 1990s | |
| Blur | 13 | 1990s | |
| Blur | Think Tank | 2000s | |
| Blur | The Magic Whip | 2010s | |
| Blur | The Ballad of Darren | 2020s | |
| David Bowie | Aladdin Sane | 1970s | |
| David Bowie | Pin Ups | 1970s | |
| David Bowie | Diamond Dogs | 1970s | |
| David Bowie | Scary Monsters (and Super Creeps) | 1980s | |
| David Bowie | Let's Dance | 1980s | |
| David Bowie | Tonight | 1980s | |
| David Bowie | Changesbowie | 1990s | |
| David Bowie | Black Tie White Noise | 1990s | |
| David Bowie | The Next Day | 2010s | |
| David Bowie | Blackstar | 2010s | |
| David Bowie | Best of Bowie (Note: Originally released in 2002) | 2010s | |
| Elton John | Don't Shoot Me I'm Only the Piano Player | 1970s | |
| Elton John | Goodbye Yellow Brick Road | 1970s | |
| Elton John | Caribou | 1970s | |
| Elton John | Greatest Hits | 1970s | |
| Elton John | Sleeping with the Past (Note: Originally released in 1989) | 1990s | |
| Elton John | The Very Best of Elton John | 1990s | |
| Elton John | Good Morning to the Night | 2010s | |
| Elton John | The Lockdown Sessions | 2020s | |
| Elton John | Diamonds (Note: Originally released in 2017) | 2020s | |
| Elton John | Who Believes in Angels? (Note: The album is credited to Elton John and Brandi Carlile) | 2020s | |
| George Michael | Faith | 1980s | |
| George Michael | Listen Without Prejudice Vol. 1 | 1990s | |
| George Michael | Older | 1990s | |
| George Michael | Ladies & Gentlemen: The Best of George Michael | 1990s | |
| George Michael | Patience | 2000s | |
| George Michael | Twenty Five | 2000s | |
| George Michael | Symphonica | 2010s | |
| Oasis | Definitely Maybe | 1990s | |
| Oasis | (What's the Story) Morning Glory? | 1990s | |
| Oasis | Be Here Now | 1990s | |
| Oasis | Standing on the Shoulder of Giants | 2000s | |
| Oasis | Heathen Chemistry | 2000s | |
| Oasis | Don't Believe the Truth | 2000s | |
| Oasis | Dig Out Your Soul | 2000s | |
| Oasis | Time Flies... 1994–2009 | 2010s | |
| Oasis | Definitely Maybe | 2020s | |
| Oasis | Time Flies... 1994–2009 | 2020s | |
| Queen | A Night at the Opera | 1970s | |
| Queen | A Day at the Races | 1970s | |
| Queen | The Game | 1980s | |
| Queen | Greatest Hits | 1980s | |
| Queen | A Kind of Magic | 1980s | |
| Queen | The Miracle | 1980s | |
| Queen | Innuendo | 1990s | |
| Queen | Greatest Hits II | 1990s | |
| Queen | Made in Heaven | 1990s | |
| Queen | Live Around the World (Note: The album is credited to Queen + Adam Lambert) | 2020s | |
| Cliff Richard | 21 Today | 1960s | |
| Cliff Richard | The Young Ones | 1960s | |
| Cliff Richard | Summer Holiday | 1960s | |
| Cliff Richard | 40 Golden Greats | 1970s | |
| Cliff Richard | Love Songs | 1980s | |
| Cliff Richard | Private Collection: 1979–1988 | 1980s | |
| Cliff Richard | The Album | 1990s | |
| Paul Simon | Paul Simon | 1970s | |
| Paul Simon | Graceland | 1980s | |
| Paul Simon | The Rhythm of the Saints | 1990s | |
| Paul Simon | The Ultimate Collection | 2010s | |
| Paul Simon | Stranger to Stranger | 2010s | |
| Stereophonics | Performance and Cocktails | 1990s | |
| Stereophonics | Just Enough Education to Perform | 2000s | |
| Stereophonics | You Gotta Go There to Come Back | 2000s | |
| Stereophonics | Language. Sex. Violence. Other? | 2000s | |
| Stereophonics | Pull the Pin | 2000s | |
| Stereophonics | Keep the Village Alive | 2010s | |
| Stereophonics | Kind | 2010s | |
| Stereophonics | Oochya! | 2020s | |
| Stereophonics | Make 'Em Laugh, Make 'Em Cry, Make 'Em Wait | 2020s | |
| Steps | Steptacular | 1990s | |
| Steps | Gold: Greatest Hits | 2000s | |
| Steps | The Ultimate Collection | 2010s | |
| Steps | Platinum Collection | 2020s | |
| Barbra Streisand | A Star Is Born | 1970s | |
| Barbra Streisand | Barbra Streisand's Greatest Hits Volume 2 | 1970s | |
| Barbra Streisand | Guilty | 1980s | |
| Barbra Streisand | Memories | 1980s | |
| Barbra Streisand | The Essential Barbra Streisand | 2000s | |
| Barbra Streisand | Love Is the Answer | 2000s | |
| Barbra Streisand | Encore: Movie Partners Sing Broadway | 2010s | |
| Take That | Everything Changes | 1990s | |
| Take That | Nobody Else | 1990s | |
| Take That | Greatest Hits | 1990s | |
| Take That | Beautiful World | 2000s | |
| Take That | The Circus | 2000s | |
| Take That | Progress | 2010s | |
| Take That | III | 2010s | |
| Take That | Odyssey | 2010s | |
| Take That | This Life | 2020s | |
| Shania Twain | Come On Over | 1990s, 2000s | |
| Shania Twain | Now | 2010s | |
| Shania Twain | Queen of Me | 2020s | |
| U2 | War | 1980s | |
| U2 | The Unforgettable Fire | 1980s | |
| U2 | The Joshua Tree | 1980s | |
| U2 | Rattle and Hum | 1980s | |
| U2 | Zooropa | 1990s | |
| U2 | Pop | 1990s | |
| U2 | The Best of 1980–1990 | 1990s | |
| U2 | All That You Can't Leave Behind | 2000s | |
| U2 | How to Dismantle an Atomic Bomb | 2000s | |
| U2 | No Line on the Horizon | 2000s | |
| U2 | Songs of Surrender | 2020s | |
| Paul Weller | Stanley Road | 1990s | |
| Paul Weller | Illumination | 2000s | |
| Paul Weller | 22 Dreams | 2000s | |
| Paul Weller | Sonik Kicks | 2010s | |
| Paul Weller | On Sunset | 2020s | |
| Paul Weller | Fat Pop (Volume 1) | 2020s | |
| Robbie Williams | Life thru a Lens | 1990s | |
| Robbie Williams | I've Been Expecting You | 1990s | |
| Robbie Williams | Sing When You're Winning | 2000s | |
| Robbie Williams | Swing When You're Winning | 2000s | |
| Robbie Williams | Escapology | 2000s | |
| Robbie Williams | Greatest Hits | 2000s | |
| Robbie Williams | Intensive Care | 2000s | |
| Robbie Williams | Rudebox | 2000s | |
| Robbie Williams | In and Out of Consciousness: Greatest Hits 1990–2010 | 2010s | |
| Robbie Williams | Take the Crown | 2010s | |
| Robbie Williams | Swings Both Ways | 2010s | |
| Robbie Williams | The Heavy Entertainment Show | 2010s | |
| Robbie Williams | The Christmas Present | 2010s | |
| Robbie Williams | XXV | 2020s | |
| Robbie Williams | Better Man | 2020s | |
| Robbie Williams | Britpop | 2020s | |
