= The Moons =

English rock band

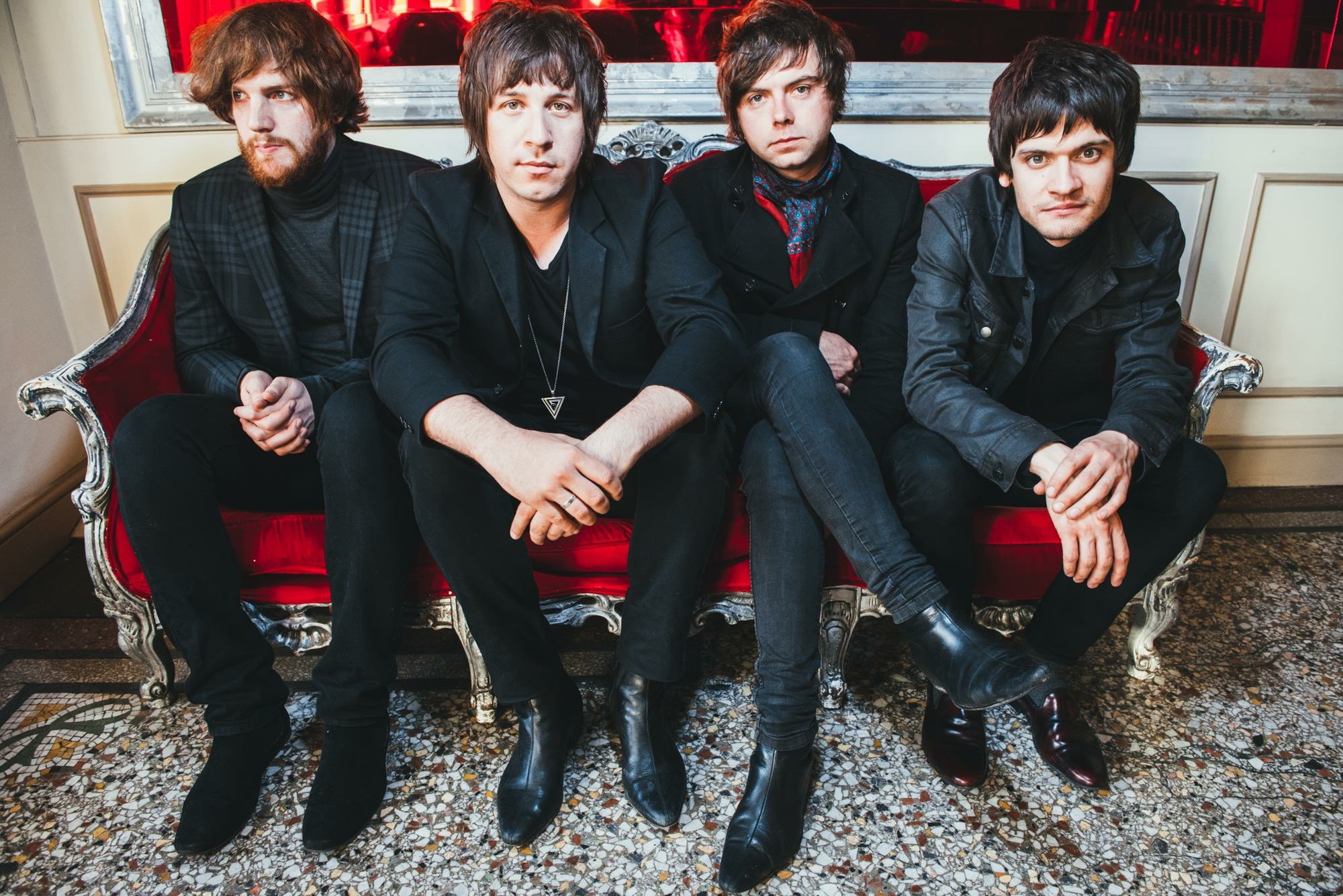
- The Moons backstage at Bush Hall London

Background information
- Origin: Northampton, England
- Genres: Alternative; indie; space pop; psychedelia; garage rock
- Years active: 2008–present
- Labels: Colorama; Schnitzel; Acid Jazz
- Spinoffs: Temples
- Members: Andy Crofts; Ben Gordelier; Chris Watson; Ben Curtis; Tom Van Heel
- Past members: Chris Ketley; Adam Leeds; James Edward Bagshaw; Thomas Walmsley; Adam Macleod; Luke Goddard
- Website: themoons.co.uk

The Moons are an English indie rock band formed in Northampton 2008 by singer/guitarist/songwriter Andy Crofts. The Moons have released four studio albums; Pocket Melodies (2020) on Colorama Records, Mindwaves (2014) and Fables of History (2012) on Schnitzel Records Ltd and the debut Life On Earth on Acid Jazz Records in 2010.

== History ==
=== Early days (2006–2007) ===
At the end of 2006, Crofts' former band The On Offs broke up. Shortly after this Crofts and Ben Gordelier worked together for the first time, recording bass and drums for former On Offs frontman and friend Danny Connors on one of his projects. As a solo artist, Crofts had built up a collection of demos during The On Offs period, and in 2007 he made a Myspace page (under band name 'The Moons') and uploaded a few songs to gain feedback. Within days Lois Wilson of Mojo magazine had praised Croft's song "Intermission Rag" a (Joe Meek esq instrumental) in Mojo magazine. Crofts decided to form The Moons soon after inviting various musicians such as The On Offs drummer Luke Goddard and friends to play when needed.

=== The Lunar Sessions (2008–2009) ===
The first recorded demo was The Lunar Sessions, on which Crofts played all instruments except drums, which were played by Danny Connors. Crofts released the song "Don't Go Changin" on his own label, Colorama Records, on a limited white 7" vinyl. Live performances were done with the help of friends, but Crofts soon assembled a regular line-up with Ben Gordelier (drums), Adam Leeds (bass) and Chris Ketley (guitar). Good friend Chris went on to play for The Rakes and then Ellie Goulding. Chris and Adam eventually moved on from the band, and James Bagshaw and Tom Warmsley had joined the band on guitar and keys, completing the new line-up.

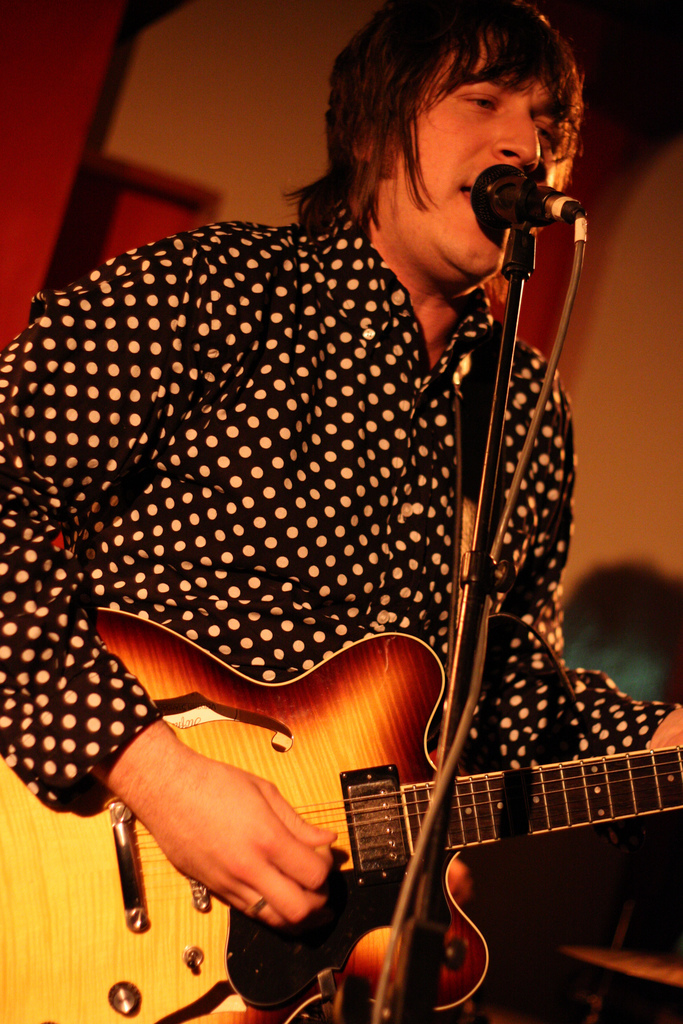
Andy Crofts performing with The Moons in 2009

=== Life On Earth (2010) ===
The Moons recorded their debut album Life On Earth (released on Acid Jazz Records, March 2010) in Paul Weller's studio. The album featured new versions of the Lunar Session tracks and the official first single release was "Torn Between Two". A slow psych groover and fuzz galore. Paul Weller played piano on the track "Wondering" and lead guitar on "Last Night On Earth". The first track, "Don't Go Changing", was recorded at Dulcitone Studios with Lee Russell. The Moons toured extensively playing headline shows and supporting many acts including Ocean Colour Scene and The Rifles. Four tracks from Life On Earth were released as singles and the album made it into the top 30. Though the album received great praise and earned many fans, Crofts felt the album could have been musically better and less rushed. In between shows and tours, The Moons played live Radio shows for the BBC with Janice Long and Mark Lamarr and played In-Store shows at Oxford Street HMV and Carnaby Street. A highlight of the year was their support slot for Ocean Colour Scene at the Royal Albert Hall in October. The Moons spent the rest of the year demo-ing song towards their second album with Edwyn Collins and Seb Lewsley at Westheath Yard studios, London.

=== 2011 ===
While taking time out to record their second album with Edwyn Collins, The Moons returned to the live circuit in 2011 with new album material at The Gibson Lounge London, part of the MERC Live gig series in conjunction with Gibson Guitars and Clash Magazine.

The Moons were featured as part of the Channel 4 JD Set. Chosen by The Stone Roses' Mani to pay tribute to The Smiths, The Moons performed cover versions of The Smiths songs along Kid British, Little Barrie and Tom Clarke of The Enemy. The band performed "There Is A Light That Never Goes Out" at Manchester's Band On The Wall venue on 12 May 2011. In October they supported Beady Eye on their European Tour.

=== 2012 ===
2012 started as a quiet year for Crofts. Though he had been writing demos and recording songs, he had no shows lined up for The Moons. Instead he took The Moons into the studio to complete the mixing of the second album "Fables Of History" where he met new keyboard player Tom Van Heel who was working in the studio. The album was mixed and produced over two weeks by known producer Jan 'Stan' Kybert who in the past had worked with Oasis, Massive Attack, The Rifles and Paul Weller's 2012 No1 album Sonik Kicks. The album was mastered by Howie Weinberg in LA and soon returned to Crofts.

Crofts and band signed a new record deal with East London label Schnitzel Records Ltd., Insisting that the deal had to be done correctly, Crofts refused to sign the deal unless it was signed on a new/full moon 21 February. The deal was signed with Schnitzel Records Ltd. and plans for the album and singles were immediately in place. The first single to come from the new album was "Double Vision Love" and "English Summer" on limited 7" vinyl and download. The B side "English Summer" was a simple observational song by Crofts and captured the essence of a typical day in Britain. Also in May The Moons supported Beady Eye on their only headline show of the year at Warrington Parr Hall as warm up the Stone Roses support. In May Jack Wills clothing company used The Moons song "English Summer" (taken from the Double Vision Love single B side) for their 2012 Summer Holiday fashion campaign. The song has already become the summer anthem for many fans of The Moons. The second album Fables of History was released on 24 September 2012 with a limited white vinyl and two album covers.

The second single to come from the album was the grande "Jennifer (Sits Alone)". "A beautiful song for outsiders" says Crofts. The single became part 2 of the collectors vinyls accompanied with a music video in an old London library featuring Jennie Watson. The band went through another transition after James and Tom left The Moons to form the band Temples. Crofts recruited friends Ben Curtis former bass player of The Sand Band from Liverpool and local guitarist Chris Watson to complete The Moons line-up. The final single to come from the album late in 2012 was the song Something Soon. The song featured Paul Weller and completed the trilogy of collectors singles. A music video was made also featuring Weller and became a hot favourite to Moons fans and the indie scene. All of The Moons videos were made by director Joe Connor who had already worked with many bands such as The Courteeners, Band of Skulls and Paul Weller. Joe's work for The Moons undoubtedly give the band the perfect transition to screen. The Moons loyalty to Joe Connor has remained and the band continue to work with him.

== Discography ==
=== Albums ===
- Life On Earth (March 2010)
- Fables Of History (September 2012)
- Mindwaves (July 2014)
- Pocket Melodies (October 2020)

Year	Album	UK Albums Chart position	UK Indie Albums Chart position
2010	Life on Earth: Released 15 March 2010; Label: Acid Jazz Records	-	27
2012	Fables of History: Released 24 September 2012; Label: Schnitzel Records Ltd	-	27
2014	Mindwaves: Released 21 July 2014; Label: Schnitzel Records Ltd	-	25
2020	Pocket Melodies: Released 23 October 2020; Label: Colorama Records	-	12

=== Singles ===
Release date	Title	Chart positions	
Release date	Title	UK Singles Chart	UK; IND
2010	Torn Between Two / Leaving Here	-	-
2010	Nightmare Day / Wondering	-	-
2010	Let It Go / Its taking Over (Alternative recording)	-	-
2010	Everyday Heroes / Rear Window	-	-
2012	Double Vision Love / English Summer	-	-
2012	Jennifer (Sits Alone) / It's Too Late	-	-
2012	Something Soon / Revolutionary Lovers (picture disc)	-	-
2014	Heart And Soul / Sex Robot / Get Ready (The Temptations cover)	-	-
2014	Body Snatchers / Everybody's Happy Nowadays (Buzzcocks cover)	-	-
