= How Did It Ever Come to This? =

Single by easyworld
- Released: 30 August 2004
- Genre: Indie rock
- Length: 11:51
- Label: Jive
- Producer(s): Laurie Latham and Easyworld

Easyworld singles chronology
"This Is Where I Stand" (2002)	"How Did It Ever Come to This?" (2004)

"How Did it Ever Come to This?" was the last single released by the British band Easyworld. It did not appear on their second and final album Kill the Last Romantic, because it had not yet been written. The band's record label Jive decided the band should record a new track as it was felt none of the tracks on the album were suitable for release. The single charted at #50 in September 2004, missing the top 40 after "Til the Day" charted at #27 in February. Easyworld announced their split the following week, though this had been decided in July, after lead singer David Ford informed all concerned that he wished to pursue a solo career. The eventual announcement of the band's split came by accident, after Mark Lamarr revealed the news live on Radio 2. The CD single contains a cover of Candi Staton's "Young Hearts Run Free" and "You Can't Tear Polaroids" which was written and sung by bassist Jo Taylor.

Kill the Last Romantic was due to be re-released containing the single, with a heavy promotional campaign behind it. However, Jive was bought out by BMG, which in turn was bought out by Sony, and the ensuing disruption meant that this plan was shelved. After the band's split the three members negotiated a release from their contracts.

== Track listing ==
1. How Did It Ever Come To This?
2. Young Hearts Run Free
3. You Can't Tear Polaroids
