= 66 (album) =

Studio album by Paul Weller
- Released: 24 May 2024
- Recorded: 2021–2024
- Studio: Black Barn Studio
- Length: 41:50
- Labels: Polydor; Solid Bond
- Producers: Christophe Vaillant; Paul Weller; White Label

Paul Weller chronology
Fat Pop (Volume 1) (2021)	66 (2024)

Singles from 66
- 1. "Soul Wandering" Released: 23 February 2024; 2. "Rise Up Singing" Released: 19 April 2024

66 is the seventeenth solo studio album by the English singer-songwriter Paul Weller. It was released on 24 May 2024 through Polydor Records and Solid Bond. The title is a reference to his 66th birthday, just a day after the release.

== Background ==
With 66, the artist remains "steadfastly creative" and digs into "his bedrock". It was recorded at Weller's Black Barn studio from 2021 to 2024. The "reflective and inward thinking album" features contributions from Noel Gallagher, Bobby Gillespie of Primal Scream, Suggs of Madness, Richard Hawley, Dr Robert of the Blow Monkeys, Christophe Vaillant of Le SuperHomard, and Erland Cooper as well as orchestral arrangements by Hannah Peel. The lead single "Soul Wandering", which was released on 23 February 2024, is a "sleek midtempo rocker" and features "regal horns", "gospel-style backing vocals" and organ sections. Weller released "Rise Up Singing" as the second single on 19 April, alongside a music video directed by Calum Macdiamid.

The album's artwork is by Sir Peter Blake, who also created the cover art for Weller's third album, Stanley Road.

== Critical reception ==
Writing for The Observer, Phil Mongredien described 66 as "solid, rather than exceptional", awarding it three stars out of five.

=== Year-end lists ===
Select year-end rankings for 66
Publication/critic	Accolade	Rank	Ref.
MOJO	The Best Albums Of 2024	17	
Uncut	80 Best Albums of 2024	41	

== Track listing ==
66 track listing
No.	Title	Writer(s)	Length
1.	"Ship of Fools"	Paul Weller; Graham McPherson	2:58
2.	"Flying Fish"	Weller	4:41
3.	"Jumble Queen"	Weller; Noel Gallagher	2:34
4.	"Nothing"	Weller; Andrew Chalk; McPherson	4:16
5.	"My Best Friend's Coat"	Weller; Christophe Vaillant	2:46
6.	"Rise Up Singing"	Weller; Miles Copeland; Dr. Robert	3:02
7.	"I Woke Up"	Weller	3:24
8.	"A Glimpse of You"	Weller; Vaillant	3:33
9.	"Sleepy Hollow"	Weller	3:21
10.	"In Full Flight"	Weller; Anthony Brown; Tom Doyle	3:58
11.	"Soul Wandering"	Weller; Bobby Gillespie	3:19
12.	"Burn Out"	Weller; Erland Cooper	3:58
Total length:			41:50

66 Deluxe Edition track listing of disc 2
No.	Title	Writer(s)	Length
1.	"Wheel of Fortune"	Weller	2:37
2.	"In a Silent World"	Weller	3:28
3.	"Now Is Here"	Weller	5:40
4.	"Gotta Get On"	Weller	4:14
Total length:			16:03

== Personnel ==
=== Musicians ===
- Paul Weller – lead vocals (all tracks), background vocals (tracks 1–4, 6–12), electric guitar (1–4, 6, 11), bass guitar (1, 3, 4, 6, 7, 9, 10), acoustic guitar (1, 3, 7, 9, 11, 12), piano (1, 3, 6, 12), Mellotron (2, 4, 12), organ (2); percussion, Rhodes, synthesizer (4); Hammond organ, Wurlitzer electric piano (11); celesta, slide guitar (12)
- Ben Gordelier – drums (all tracks), percussion (tracks 2–4)
- Jacko Peake – flute (tracks 1, 9), saxophone (1), tenor saxophone (3, 9, 12), baritone saxophone (3, 9)
- Steve Pilgrim – acoustic guitar (track 1), background vocals (9)
- Max Beesley – vibraphone (tracks 1, 9)
- Le SuperHomard – synthesizer (tracks 2, 5, 8); acoustic guitar, background vocals, bass guitar, piano, tambourine, vibraphone (5, 8); celesta, Hammond organ, harpsichord, keyboards, organ (5); Mellotron, percussion, stylophone (8)
- Josh McClorey – bass guitar (track 2), electric guitar (11)
- Charles Rees – drum programming, synthesizer (track 2)
- Dave Boraston – trumpet (tracks 3, 6), piccolo trumpet (3), flugelhorn (4, 11)
- Steve Trigg – trumpet (tracks 3, 6), flugelhorn (4, 11)
- Tom Heel – background vocals (tracks 3, 9, 12), electric guitar (3); acoustic guitar, background vocals (4); Wurlitzer electric piano (10), Hammond organ (12)
- Louise Marshall – background vocals (tracks 3, 11)
- Sumudu Jayatilaka – background vocals (tracks 3, 11)
- Andy Gilliams – trombone (track 3)
- Steve Brown – Moog bass (track 4)
- Hannah Peel – conductor (tracks 5–8, 12)
- Britten Sinfonia – orchestra (tracks 5–8, 12)
- Steve Cradock – electric guitar (tracks 6, 9–11), acoustic guitar (6)
- Dr. Robert – background vocals (track 6)
- Leah Weller – background vocals (track 6)
- Paul Speare – baritone saxophone (track 6)
- Marco Rees – electric guitar (track 6)
- Anthony Gaylard – tenor saxophone (track 6)
- Steve Brookes – acoustic guitar (track 7)
- Richard Hawley – lap steel guitar (track 7)
- Jake Fletcher – background vocals (track 9), bass guitar (11)
- Tom Doyle – drum programming, electric guitar, glockenspiel, Hammond organ, saxophone, strings, synthesizer, Wurlitzer electric piano (track 10)
- Say She She – background vocals (track 10)
- Erland Cooper – background vocals (track 12)
- Andy Crofts – bass guitar (track 12)

=== Technical ===
- Paul Weller – production (tracks 1–4, 6–12)
- Christophe Vaillant – production (track 5)
- White Label – production (track 10)
- Charles Rees – additional production, mixing, engineering
- Matt Colton – mastering
- Christopher Parker – engineering (tracks 5–8, 12)
- John Barrett – engineering (tracks 5–8, 12)
- Tom Ashpitel – engineering assistance (tracks 5–8, 12)
- Steve Trigg – horn arrangement (tracks 4, 11)
- Hannah Peel – orchestral arranger (tracks 5–8, 12)

== Charts ==
Chart performance for 66
Chart (2024–2025)	Peak position
Australian Albums (ARIA)	166
Austrian Albums (Ö3 Austria)	12
Belgian Albums (Ultratop Flanders)	18
Belgian Albums (Ultratop Wallonia)	61
Croatian International Albums (HDU)	6
Dutch Albums (Album Top 100)	41
German Albums (Offizielle Top 100)	16
Greek Albums (IFPI)	44
Irish Albums (Official Charts)	9
Italian Albums (FIMI)	73
Japanese Albums (Oricon)	30
Japanese Hot Albums (Billboard Japan)	43
Scottish Albums (Official Charts)	3
Spanish Albums (Promusicae)	57
Swedish Physical Albums (Sverigetopplistan)	6
Swiss Albums (Schweizer Hitparade)	41
UK Albums (Official Charts)	4
