= A Kind Revolution =

Studio album by Paul Weller
- Released: 12 May 2017
- Genre: Pop rock
- Length: 42:54
- Label: Parlophone
- Producer: Paul Weller

Paul Weller chronology
Saturns Pattern (2015)	A Kind Revolution (2017)	True Meanings (2018)

Singles from A Kind Revolution
- 1. "Long Long Road" Released: 30 March 2017; 2. "Nova" Released: 30 March 2017; 3. "Woo Sé Mama" Released: 25 August 2017; 4. "The Cranes Are Back" Released: 22 September 2017; 5. "One Tear" Released: 10 November 2017

Professional ratings
Aggregate scores
Source	Rating
Metacritic	86/100
Review scores
Source	Rating
AllMusic	3.5/5 stars
The Guardian	4/5 stars
The Independent	4/5 stars
Mojo	5/5 stars
PopMatters	9/10
Slant	4.5/5 stars
Uncut	4/5 stars

A Kind Revolution is the thirteenth studio album by English singer-songwriter Paul Weller, released 12 May 2017. It contains a collaboration with Robert Wyatt in the song "She Moves with the Fayre".

== Track listing ==
All tracks are written by Paul Weller, except as indicated.

No.	Title	Writer(s)	Length
1.	"Woo Sé Mama"	Paul Weller and Jan Stan Kybert	3:44
2.	"Nova"		3:58
3.	"Long Long Road"		3:24
4.	"She Moves with the Fayre"		4:23
5.	"The Cranes Are Back"		4:23
6.	"Hopper"		3:15
7.	"New York"		4:43
8.	"One Tear"	Paul Weller and Jan Stan Kybert	6:07
9.	"Satellite Kid"		5:17
10.	"The Impossible Idea"		3:40
Total length:			42:54

== Personnel ==
- P.P. Arnold - Backing Vocals (1)
- Madeline Bell - Backing Vocals (1)
- Boy George - Lead Vocals (8)
- Jessica Cox - Strings (4,7,8,10)
- Steve Cradock - Acoustic Guitar (6), Electric Guitar (1–3,7), Percussion (7)
- Andy Crofts - Electric Guitar (1,3,6,9,10), Bass Guitar (1,2,5,6,8,10), Organ (9), Hammond (2,3,6,7), Philicorda (1,2), Moog (2,8), Mini Moog (5), Backing Vocals (1–10)
- Paloma Deike - Strings (3,4,7,8,10)
- Ben Gordelier - Drums (1–10), Percussion (1–4,6,7,9,10)
- Jan Stan Kybert - Keyboards (1), Programming (5,8)
- Josh McClorey - Electric Guitar (8), Lead Guitar (1,2,9), Moog (9)
- Steve Pilgrim - Acoustic Guitar (5,8), Backing Vocals (1,2,4,5,8–10)
- Charles Rees - Drums (4)
- Jon Scott - Trumpet (6)
- Amy Stanford - Strings (4,7,8,10)
- Laura Stanford - Strings (3,4,7,8,10)
- Chris Storr - Trumpet (6)
- Phil Veacock - Saxophone (2), Tenor Saxophone (6), Baritone Saxophone (6)
- Hannah Weller - Backing Vocals (5)
- Paul Weller - Lead Vocals (1–10), Acoustic Guitar (3,6,10), Electric Guitar (1,2,4–10), Bass Guitar (1,3,4,7,9), Piano (1,3–10), Hammond (1,3,5,9), Mellotron (4), Keyboards (5), Synths (7), Harmonium (6), Glockenspiel (9), Backing Vocals (3,5,7–10)
- Alistair White - Trombone (6)
- Robert Wyatt - Vocals (4), Trumpet (4)

== Charts ==
Chart	Peak position
Austrian Albums (Ö3 Austria)	45
Belgian Albums (Ultratop Flanders)	25
Belgian Albums (Ultratop Wallonia)	72
Dutch Albums (Album Top 100)	45
Italian Albums (FIMI)	24
Irish Albums (OCC)	11
German Albums (Offizielle Top 100)	49
Scottish Albums (OCC)	3
Spanish Albums (PROMUSICAE)	40
UK Albums (OCC)	5
