= Saturns Pattern (song) =

2015 single by Paul Weller

Single by Paul Weller

from the album Saturns Pattern
- Released: 11 May 2015
- Length: 3:26
- Label: Parlophone; Warner Music Group
- Songwriter(s): Paul Weller
- Producer(s): Paul Weller

Paul Weller singles chronology
"White Sky" (2015)	"Saturns Pattern" (2015)	"Going My Way" (2015)

"Saturns Pattern" is a song released by Paul Weller as a single on May 11, 2015. It was first broadcast on The Chris Evans Breakfast Show on BBC Radio 2. It was released on 7" and 12" vinyl formats and digitally. It was the first single to be taken from Weller's 12th studio album, Saturns Pattern, of which it is the title track. Its B-side is the non-album track "Sun Goes".

Reviewed in The Guardian, Weller's Saturns Pattern was called his continued "purple patch" of writing and music.

== Weekly charts ==
The single reached number 2 on the UK Vinyl Singles Chart on 17 May 2015.
