= I Sincerely Apologise for All the Trouble I've Caused =

I Sincerely Apologise For All The Trouble I've Caused

Studio album by David Ford
- Released: October 3, 2005
- Recorded: 2004–2005
- Genre: Singer-songwriter
- Length: 51:06
- Label: Independiente
- Producer: David Ford

David Ford chronology
I Sincerely Apologise For All The Trouble I've Caused (2005)	Songs for the Road (2007)

Professional ratings
Review scores
Source	Rating
Allmusic	3/5 stars
Rawkstar	link
Rolling Stone	link

I Sincerely Apologise for All the Trouble I've Caused is an album by singer-songwriter David Ford released in 2005. The album is Ford's solo debut.

Ford recorded the album in his home studio over the course of 2005. Publicity material describing both Ford and the album state that "I Sincerely Apologise" was recorded in the cellar of his flat in Lewes. According to an interview given to Top Notch magazine, David moved house at least twice during the recording process and took to recording songs using his own equipment in the homes of the people "kind enough to put [him] up for a week here or a month there". After completing the recording, Ford mixed the album himself in the aforementioned Lewes cellar in late 2004 and early 2005.

== Track listing ==
All songs written by David Ford.

1. "This Is Not Desire (Hidden track)"
2. "I Don’t Care What You Call Me"
3. "State Of The Union"
4. "What Would You Have Me Do?"
5. "Cheer Up (You Miserable Fuck)"
6. "A Long Time Ago"
7. "Don’t Tell Me"
8. "Katie"
9. "If You Only Knew"
10. "Laughing Aloud"

== Personnel ==
- David Ford – All instruments & production.
- Frances Law – Additional vocals
- Franco Bidanco – Tenor saxophone
- Team Sundry F.C. – Choral voices
