= David Ford (musician) =

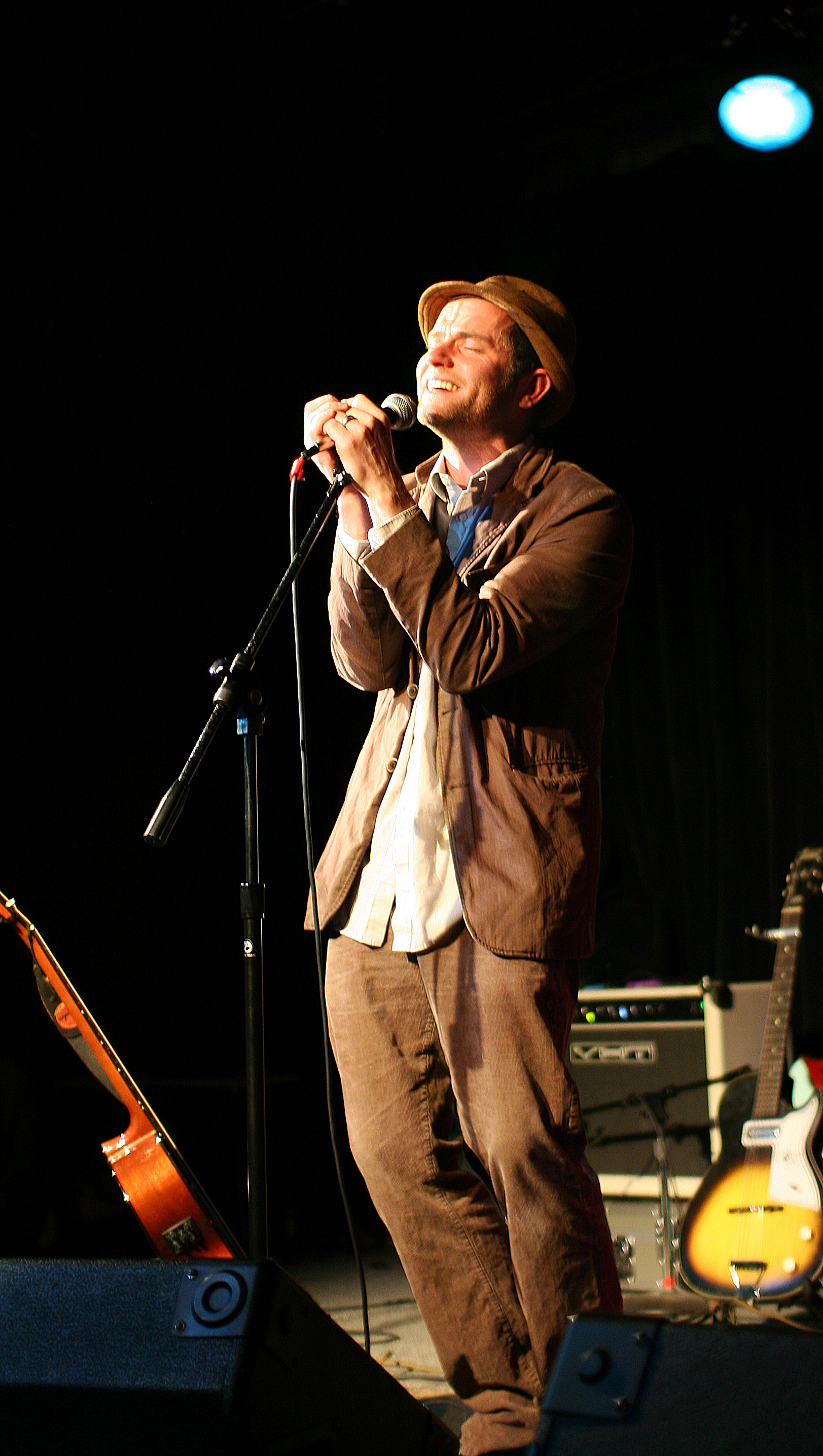
- David Ford performing at The Ark in Ann Arbor, Michigan, 20 November 2008

Background information
- Born: 16 May 1978 (age 48); Dartford, Kent, England
- Occupation: Singer-songwriter
- Years active: 1996–present
- Label: Independiente
- Website: www.davidfordmusic.com

David James Ford (born 16 May 1978) is an English singer-songwriter, guitarist and songwriter. He first achieved prominence with the indie rock group Easyworld, who released an independent mini-album, ...Better Ways to Self Destruct and two full-length albums on Jive Records before disbanding in 2004.

As a solo artist, he has released eight albums to date. David has toured the world opening for such artists as KT Tunstall, Gomez, Elvis Costello, Ingrid Michaelson and Ray LaMontagne and he has played the UK Latitude Festival, Bonnaroo and Austin City Limits. Ford has also performed on Last Call With Carson Daly and Sun Studio Sessions. The Guardian called him "unmissable... one of Britain's best."

== History ==
=== Early years and Easyworld ===
Having played in several local groups together through their school years, Ford – who went on to attend Manchester University – and drummer Glenn Hooper formed the band Beachy Head in Eastbourne in the late 1990s. Soon after, the band was completed by bassist Jo Taylor. The trio recorded several demos and an unreleased album as Beachy Head before renaming the band Easyworld. The new name for the band was taken from the line "It's an easy world" in their song Better Ways to Self Destruct.

From 2001 to 2004, the group released one mini-album, two full-length albums and several singles. After lacklustre sales of their final record, Kill the Last Romantic, Ford privately announced his intention to disband the group. After several short festival performances and radio appearances to promote their final single, How Did It Ever Come to This?, Easyworld announced their split in September 2004. Their last public performance was at the Staffordshire date of 2004s V Festival on 22 August.

=== Solo career ===
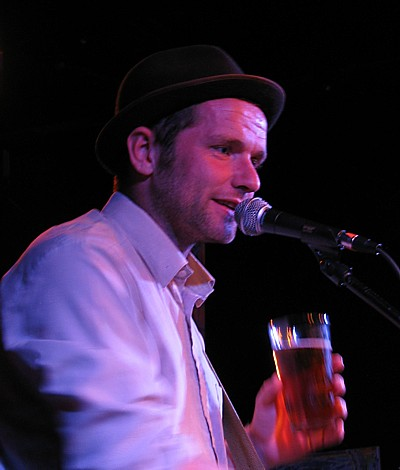
David Ford at The Saint, Asbury Park, New Jersey, May 2011

Almost immediately after Easyworld's dissolution, Ford began to play a sporadic series of intimate solo gigs, debuting a number of songs which would later appear on his first solo album. In 2005, he embarked on his first headline solo tour. Fan favourite "State of the Union" was released as his debut single on 26 September 2005, followed swiftly by his self-recorded debut album I Sincerely Apologise For All The Trouble I've Caused.

After a support tour with Starsailor and a sold-out headline tour in February 2006 and the release of his second single, "I Don't Care What You Call Me", David confirmed headline shows in Ireland as well as shows across the US and high-profile slots supporting KT Tunstall, Richard Ashcroft, Elvis Costello and Gomez. His debut was released in the United States in May 2006 by Columbia Records.

After supporting Suzanne Vega on her UK tour, Ford released his second solo album, Songs for the Road in August 2007. He toured extensively to support the album in October 2007 and toured the US in May 2008. The album was released in the US on Original Signal Records on 1 April 2008. Ford released a cover of The Smiths' "There Is a Light That Never Goes Out" as a bonus track. His third studio album, Let The Hard Times Roll, was released on 3 February 2010.

Ford released his most successful album to date, Charge, in the UK in March 2013, and America in June 2013. Charge was produced by James Brown, who had just completed Dave Grohl’s most recent Sound City project and is a fan of Ford's music. Brown agreed to produce and mix the new album on his kitchen table in Brooklyn, New York, for the price of a few pizzas. Charge debuted on the UK independent Album Chart at No. 30. A review in The Daily Telegraph praised both the album and the accompanying tour: "His fourth solo album of smart, angry, witty, emotional songs delivered with raw-throated passion. Live, he is something to behold, a one man band looping up an acoustic storm…stirring and extraordinary".

In 2012, Ford's 2008 single "I'm Alright Now" was pitched to French singer Johnny Hallyday, and became a hit in January 2013 under the name "20 ans" ("20 years") with French lyrics by Christophe Miossec. In February 2014, this song was awarded "Best Original Song" at the Victoires de la Musique awards, sometimes referred to as "the French Grammys", with Ford and Miossec accepting the award on stage in Paris.

=== Personal life ===
Ford is married to Emma Ellis. He has stated that his favourite place to perform in the US is Philadelphia, Pennsylvania.

== Discography ==
=== Studio albums ===
- I Sincerely Apologise for All the Trouble I've Caused (2005)
- Songs for the Road (2007)
- Let the Hard Times Roll (2010)
- Charge (2013)
- The Arrangement (2014)
- Animal Spirits (2018)
- May You Live In Interesting Times (2022)
- Love and Death (2022)

=== Single releases ===
Single/EP	Release date	Label	Format(s)	Notes
"State of the Union"	26 September 2005	Independiente	CD, 7", Download	Accompanied by b-sides "A Short Song About Stars" and "A Short Song About Shoes"
"I Don't Care What You Call Me"	20 February 2006	Independiente	CD, 7", Download	Accompanied by CD b-sides "A Short Song Of Apology" and "Trying To Find My Feet" plus the 7" b-side "Can't Go Back"
"Go to Hell"	23 July 2007	Independiente	7", Download	Accompanied by album track "Requiem" as the 7" b-side
"Decimate"	8 October 2007	Independiente	7", Download	Accompanied by b-sides "The Boy Most Likely To" and "Decimate" (demo). The latter only available on Digital Download.
"I'm Alright Now"	20 January 2008	Independiente	CD, 7", Download	Accompanied by CD b-side cover of Leonard Cohen's "Everybody Knows" plus the 7" b-side "New York"
"Pages Torn From The Electrical Sketchbook Vol. #1"	26 September 2008	Self-released through MySpace page / iTunes	CD, Download	Contained the songs "Nothing at All", "How I Learned To Stop Worrying And Love My Credit Card" (also known as "I Want More"), and "Down by the Sea".
"Pages Torn From The Electrical Sketchbook Vol. #2"	11 December 2008	Self-released through MySpace page / iTunes	CD, Download	Contained the songs "This City's Cold and I Could Use a Friend", "To Hell with the World" and "Song for the Republican Convention".
"Pages Torn From The Electrical Sketchbook Vol. #3"	1 January 2009	Self-released through MySpace page / iTunes	CD, Download	Contained the songs "Elizabeth", "Hurricane" and "Demons" (Piano Version).
"Panic"	October 2009	Self-release	CD	Accompanied by b-sides "Making Up For Lost TIme" and "The Big Dumb Singalong"
"Austerity Measures"	1 February 2012	Self-release	CD	Contains the songs "The Ballad Of Miss Lily" (an earlier mix), "Life Is Good," "It's The Economy, Stupid," "How I Learned To Stop Worrying And Love My Credit Card" (a new mix), and "Every Time" (acoustic).
"4.1"	12 September 2011	Self-release	CD	Contains the songs "Liverpool," "Song For The Republican Convention" (a new mix), "Pour A Little Poison (feat. The Booming Quartet)" (an early version), "Let It Burn" (an early version), and "Funk Toast (feat. Velvet Hands Arnold)."
"4.2"	5 August 2012	Self-release	CD	Contains the songs: "Overture," "What's Not To Love?" (early version), "Back To Me," "Interlude," and "Philadelphia Boy" (early version).
"Tennessee E.P.(Recorded at Sun Studios – Memphis)"	December 2012	Self-release	CD	Contains the songs: "Don't You Worry," "Medicine Show," "Feels The Same," "Winter Stoke," "Jimmy Took One For The Team," and "Kid And The River".
"Charge"	2013	Self-release	CD	
"The Union E.P."	2017	Self-release	CD	

== Notes ==
Brown, Marisa. Review of I Sincerely Apologise For All The Trouble I've Caused. AllMusic. Retrieved May 2006.
