= Better Ways to Self Destruct =

EP by easyworld
- Released: 2001
- Recorded: 2000–2001
- Genre: Indie rock
- Label: Fierce Panda

Easyworld chronology
Better Ways to Self Destruct (2001)	This Is Where I Stand (2002)

Better Ways to Self Destruct is the 2001 EP by easyworld, an Eastbourne-based indie rock band. This was the band's second release, after their "Hundredweight" single, and this EP contained that earlier single, a new version of b-side "You Make Me Want To Drink Bleach" and 5 new songs, all recorded in lead singer David Ford's bedroom in his parents' house.

While the EP's recording budget was somewhat limited, the band still managed to build up a small fanbase, touring with King Adora, and undertaking headlining tours of their own. 5 tracks on this EP (all except "Lights Out", "Someone Do Something" and "Compilation Blues") were re-recorded for This is Where I Stand, the band's debut album proper, appearing a year later in 2002.

== Track listing ==
1. "Lights Out"
2. "Hundredweight"
3. "Junkies & Whores"
4. "Someone Do Something"
5. "A Stain to Never Fade"
6. "U Make Me Want To Drink Bleach (Stylophone Mix)"
7. "Try Not To Think"
8. "Compilation Blues"
