= Wake Up the Nation =

Studio album by Paul Weller
- Released: 19 April 2010
- Recorded: 2009
- Studio: Black Barn Studios, Woking, Surrey
- Genre: Rock, indie rock
- Label: Island (UK, EU); Yep Roc (USA)
- Producer: Simon Dine

Paul Weller chronology
Paul Weller – Deluxe Edition (2009)	Wake Up the Nation (2010)	Sonik Kicks (2012)

Wake Up the Nation is the tenth studio album from Paul Weller and was released on 19 April 2010. It was nominated for the 2010 Mercury Music Prize. The albums was dedicated to "absent friends – John Weller, Pat Foxton and Robert Kirby".

It is the first of Weller's albums since 1982 to feature contributions from Bruce Foxton, formerly of The Jam. Weller told Mojo magazine: "We'd both lost loved ones and without getting too spiritual that was the spur of it. I spoke to him this time last year when his wife Pat was ill and that broke the ice, then I invited him down to Black Barn (studio). There was no big plan, it was easy, a laugh, and nice to see him and work together again. We just slipped back into it."

== Reception ==
Professional ratings
Aggregate scores
Source	Rating
AnyDecentMusic?	7.9/10
Metacritic	84/100
Review scores
Source	Rating
AllMusic	4.5/5 stars
The A.V. Club	B+
The Daily Telegraph	5/5 stars
The Guardian	5/5 stars
The Independent	5/5 stars
Mojo	4/5 stars
NME	8/10
Pitchfork	7.7/10
Q	5/5 stars
Spin	7/10

Wake Up the Nation received great acclaim from most music critics. In Metro, John Lewis awarded the album 4 stars out of 5 and commented: "Since turning 50 two years ago, the Modfather seems to be making the most adventurous music of his career, astounding even the most Weller-phobic critics ... Most of the 16 tracks are short, sharp, clever and often wonderfully odd: check out bonkers music hall epic Trees, jazz waltz In Amsterdam or militaristic sound collage 7&3 Is The Strikers Name (an unlikely collaboration with My Bloody Valentine's Kevin Shields). Weller loyalists will be reassured by the copper-bottomed dad-rock staples, while Style Council fans will love Aim High, his finest blue-eyed soul ballad in ages."

== Track list ==
=== Deluxe edition CD 1/standard edition ===
All songs written by Paul Weller and Simon Dine.

1. "Moonshine" – 2:09
2. "Wake Up the Nation" – 2:19
3. "No Tears to Cry" – 2:25
4. "Fast Car / Slow Traffic" – 1:58
5. "Andromeda" – 1:53
6. "In Amsterdam" – 2:18
7. "She Speaks" – 2:15
8. "Find the Torch, Burn the Plans" – 3:09
9. "Aim High" – 3:08
10. "Trees" – 4:19
11. "Grasp & Still Connect" – 2:16
12. "Whatever Next" – 1:38
13. "7&3 Is the Strikers Name" – 3:24
14. "Up the Dosage" – 2:40
15. "Pieces of Dream" [sic] – 2:26
16. "Two Fat Ladies" – 2:39

=== Deluxe edition CD 2 ===
1. "Wake Up the Nation" (Zinc's Crack House remix) – 5:10
2. "Fast Car / Slow Traffic" (Erland & Carnival Carnivalization) – 2:50
3. "Grasp & Still Connect" (The Bees version) – 2:47
4. "She Speaks" (Tunng remix) – 3:57
5. "Andromeda" (Richard Hawley remix) – 3:51
6. "In Amsterdam" (Noonday Underground remix) – 2:00
7. "No Tears to Cry" (Leo Zero remix) 8:03
8. "Find the Torch, Burn the Plans" (Nick Zinner from the Yeah Yeah Yeah's remix)

Aim High / Pieces of a Dream – The Amorphous Androgynous Remix

9. "Part 1: Aim High (Aim Higher)" – 5:57
10. "Part 2: Pieces of a Dream (A Dream in Pieces)" – 5:27
11. "Part 3: Aim High (The Higher Aim)" – 4:57
12. "Part 4: Aim High (Like Water Needs a Flower)" – 5:05

=== Bonus tracks ===
13. "Pieces of a Dream – original version" – 2:56
14. "Grasp & Still Connect – original version" – 2:22

== Personnel ==
- Paul Weller
- Hannah Andrews – backing vocals (3,5,9,10,13,14)
- Bev Bevan – drums (1,2)
- Mark Boxall – guitar (10)
- Barrie Cadogan – guitar (1,16), bass guitar (16)
- Clem Cattini – drums (3)
- Steve Cradock – percussion (2), backing vocals (3), guitar (4,8,14), 12 string guitar (5), bass guitar (14), drums (14,15)
- Andy Crofts – bass guitar (1), stylophone (8), guitar (11), backing vocals (15), string arrangement (9)
- Rosie Danvers – cello (3,9,15)
- Terry Edwards – saxophone (2), horns (11)
- Bruce Foxton – bass guitar (4,7), backing vocals (4)
- Charles Rees – drums (5,8,10,12,15), autoharp (12), guitar (15)
- Laura Rees – backing vocals (3,13,14)
- Sally Jackson – violin (3,9,15)
- Jamie Johnson – bass guitar (15)
- Andy Lewis – bass guitar (9), backing vocals (15)
- Roger Nowell – synth guitar (5)
- Emma Owens – viola (3,9,15)
- Kerenza Peacock – violin (3,9,15)
- Steve Pilgrim – drums (9,10,11), backing vocals (15)
- Kevin Shields – guitar (7,13)
- The Woking Gay Community Choir – backing vocals (8)

== Charts ==
Chart performance for Wake Up the Nation
Chart (2010)	Peak position
Australian Albums (ARIA)	63
Belgian Albums (Ultratop Flanders)	11
Belgian Albums (Ultratop Wallonia)	83
Dutch Albums (Album Top 100)	60
French Albums (SNEP)	181
German Albums (Offizielle Top 100)	30
Irish Albums (IRMA)	8
Italian Albums (FIMI)	49
Norwegian Albums (VG-lista)	29
Spanish Albums (Promusicae)	80
UK Albums (OCC)	2
