= The Broken Wave =

Studio album by Hannah Peel
- Released: 31 January 2011 (UK)
- Recorded: Expanding Studios (Benge Studios)
- Genres: Alternative rock/indie rock, folk, electronic
- Label: Static Caravan Recordings
- Producer: Mike Lindsay

The Broken Wave is the debut album by London-based alternative rock/indie folk artist Hannah Peel, released on 31 January 2011.

== Recording, production ==
Varying in mood and tone, The Broken Wave covers themes of "joy and hope of falling in love through to the pain and loss of betrayal". In addition to eight original songs, the album features covers of "Cailin Deas Crúite na mBó" and "The Parting Glass", two traditional Irish folk songs.

The Broken Wave was mixed at Expanding Studios (Benge Studios) in London, UK by Ben Edwards and mastered at Electric Mastering in London, UK by Guy Davie.

== Critical reception ==
Professional ratings
Review scores
Source	Rating
The Guardian	3/5 stars
musicOMH	4/4 stars
The Fly	3.5/4 stars

The Broken Wave has generally received positive reviews.

Matt Conner of The Line of Best Fit commended the album, stating that "the release is best described as a house of cards, maintaining a certain grace and fragility throughout the ten songs present" and lauding its "authenticity and vulnerability few singers can approach".

John Eyles of the BBC commented that the album was a "distinctive debut album" and suggested that the album's main strengths were Peel's use of "allusions and metaphors", her "insights into the break up of relationships [that] displays a maturity rare in a 28-year-old", and her voice. Eyles also noted the "fragile beauty", which "ideally conveys the longing and yearning contained within the complex emotions of the songs".

Ben Hogwood of musicOMH stated that "her songs have a fragility that makes them the musical equivalent of frosted glass, beautifully crafted but easily shattered if not handled with due care and attention" and characterised that "endearing and plaintive" Peel's voice as a strength. However, Hogwood also noted that Peel's "candidly sing[ing] of falling in and out of love, as well as relatively ordinary day to day events ... occasionally finds her tripping over her own words".

Will Fitzpatrick of The Fly gave a positive assessment of the album and claimed that Peel "wanders into territory reminiscent of Belle & Sebastian's fragile indie pop of yore", but distinguished the acts by adding "that's far from the sum of The Broken Wave's ambition". Fitzpatrick also commented that the Peel's recording of the Irish traditional folk song "The Parting Glass" transcends its Irish roots to become a memorably eerie slab of folktronica".

== Track listing ==
All lyrics written and music composed by Hannah Peel, except where otherwise noted.

No.	Title	Length
1.	"The Almond Tree"	3:17
2.	"You Call This Your Home?"	3:02
3.	"Song for the Sea"	3:49
4.	"Today Is Not So Far Away"	3:21
5.	"Don't Kiss the Broken One"	3:06
6.	"Solitude"	4:26
7.	"Unwound"	2:59
8.	"Is This the Start?"	3:02
9.	"Cailin Deas Crúite na mBó" (Trad.)	4:28
10.	"The Parting Glass" (Trad.)	3:42

== Credits ==
Musicians

- Hannah Peel: lyrics (tracks 1–8), music (tracks 1–8), vocals, piano, synthesiser, musical box, trombone, violin, harp
- Ian Burdge: cello
- Lizzie Jones: trumpet (tracks 3 and 8)
- Mike Lindsay: arrangement, guitar, baglama, bass, backing vocals, dulcimer, percussion
- Karl Penney: drums, percussion, backing vocals
- Kate Robinson: violin
- Caroline Subedi: violin
- Bruce White: viola

Production

- Mike Lindsay: producer, arrangement
- Hannah Peel: arrangement
- Guy Davie: mastering
- Ben Edwards: mixing
- Rueben Hollenbon: engineer
- Frazer Merrick: engineer (assistant)
- Michael O'Shaughnessy: artwork and design
- Stephen May: artwork and design
- Emily Dennison: photography
