= Andy Lewis (producer) =

English record producer, musician and bassist

Andy Lewis is an English record producer, musician and bassist. He has released two albums as a solo artist, on Acid Jazz Records: Billion Pound Project in September 2005 and You Should Be Hearing Something Now! in October 2007. He is a member of the bands Pimlico, The Red Inspectors, and Spearmint.

== Career ==
Lewis has appeared as bassist and cellist in Paul Weller's live band, as well as on Weller's albums 22 Dreams, Wake Up the Nation and Sonik Kicks, contributing bass, and also cello to "Light Nights", the opening track on 22 Dreams. In 2007, Lewis and Weller released a single as a duo: "Are You Trying to Be Lonely?". He was briefly interviewed on the Just a Dream live DVD, also appearing in the rehearsal session and live BBC footage. His production credits include Swedish pop star Magnus Carlson's debut solo UK album "A Nordic Soul", which was released in 2018.

Since 2015, Lewis has been part of The Night Mail, a trio which is completed by Austrian guitarist and songwriter Robert Rotifer and drummer Ian Button. The Night Mail has recorded albums with Austrian poet and singer André Heller, English songwriter John Howard and French singer-songwriter Louis Philippe.

== Album discography ==
- Billion Pound Project, Acid Jazz, 2005
- You Should Be Hearing Something Now!, Acid Jazz, 2007
- 41, Acid Jazz, 2011 [mini LP]
- Songs For A South Herts Symphony, MP3, 2014
- Bassetlaw, MP3, 2014
- Get Ready!, MP3, 2014 [as Lewis, Doyle & Twyman]
- Summer Dancing, Acid Jazz, 2017 [with Judy Dyble]
