= True Meanings =

Studio album by Paul Weller
- Released: 14 September 2018
- Genre: Folk rock
- Length: 54:54
- Label: Parlophone
- Producer: Paul Weller

Paul Weller chronology
A Kind Revolution (2017)	True Meanings (2018)	On Sunset (2020)

True Meanings is the fourteenth studio album by English singer-songwriter Paul Weller, released on 14 September 2018.

== Music ==
True Meanings has been noted for its stripped-back, acoustic sound. The album's sound has been described as folk rock.

== Reception ==
Professional ratings
Aggregate scores
Source	Rating
Metacritic	79/100
Review scores
Source	Rating
AllMusic	4/5 stars
The Guardian	4/5 stars
NME	3/5 stars
The Telegraph	5/5 stars

According to Metacritic, the album has received a score of 79/100 based on 11 reviews from critics, indicating "generally favorable reviews".

== Track listing ==
All songs written by Paul Weller, except track 1 (Weller/O'Brien), tracks 8,9 & 14 (Weller/Cooper) and track 12 (Weller/Brown/Doyle).

No.	Title	Length
1.	"The Soul Searchers"	5:02
2.	"Glide"	2:18
3.	"Mayfly"	4:00
4.	"Gravity"	2:33
5.	"Old Castles"	3:20
6.	"What Would He Say?"	4:00
7.	"Aspects"	4:33
8.	"Bowie"	3:53
9.	"Wishing Well"	4:36
10.	"Come Along"	3:03
11.	"Books"	4:35
12.	"Movin' On"	4:31
13.	"May Love Travel with You"	3:01
14.	"White Horses"	5:26
Total length:		54:54

== Personnel ==
- Paul Weller – Vocals (1–14), Acoustic Guitar (1,3,5,7), Electric Guitar (1,3), Wurlitzer (1), Guitar (2,4,6,8–14), Piano (3,5,8,9,12), Hammond (3,14), Mellotron (6,9,14), Backing Vocals (7), Harmonium (8), Vibes (9), Melodica (10), Hand Pump Organ (11), Bells (11)
- Jo Allen – Strings (4)
- Rod Argent – Hammond Solo (1), Mellotron (14), Piano (14)
- Lizzie Ball – Strings (4)
- Natalia Bonner – Strings (4)
- Maxine Boxall – BVs (1)
- Steve Brooks – Lead Guitar (3)
- Anth Brown – Bass (12), Acoustic Guitar (12)
- Barrie Cadogan – Lead Guitar (5)
- Martin Carthy – Backing Vocals (10), Guitar (10)
- Erland Cooper – Backing Vocals (7–9,14)
- Jessica Cox – Strings (2)
- Steve Cradock – 12 String Guitar (2,6), Autoharp (2), Acoustic Guitar (7)
- Andy Crofts – Backing Vocals (4,7), String Arrangement (4,5), Bass (5,6), Acoustic Guitar (7), Nashville Tuned Guitar (7)
- Rosie Danvers – Strings (4)
- Paloma Deike – Strings (2)
- Tom Doyle – Drums (12), Wurlitzer (12), Mellotron (12), Hammond (12)
- Isabelle Dunn – Strings (1,5,8–10,12,14), Extra Cello (7)
- Noel Gallagher – Harmonium (11), Space Hammond (14)
- Danielle Ganeva – Vibraphone (12)
- Ben Gordelier – Drums (5,6)
- Tom Heel – Backing Vocals (1,6,12), Rhodes Piano (6)
- Becky Jones – Strings (4)
- Jan Stan Kybert – Percussion (1), Glockenspiel (14)
- Sheema Murkajee – Sitar (11), Tampoura (11), Vocals (11)
- Conor O'Brien – Vocals (1), Bass (1), Drums (1), Mini-Moog (1), Rhodes (1)
- Stella Page – Strings (1,5,8–10,12,14)
- Antonia Pagulatos – Strings (1,5,8–10,12,14)
- Hannah Peel – String Arrangements and conducting (1,5,7–10,12,14), Strings performer (7)
- Steve Pilgrim – Vocals (2), Guitar (2,4,6), Backing Vocals (4,6,7), Acoustic Guitar (7)
- Hayley Pomfrett – Strings (4)
- Charles Rees – Programming (3), Electric Organ (5), Bass Synth (9)
- Lucy Rose – Vocals (11)
- Katono Sato – Strings (1,4,5,8–10,12,14), Solo Violin (2)
- Kamalbir Singh Nandra – Violin (11)
- Amy Stanford – Strings (2)
- Ellie Stanford – Strings (4)
- Laura Stanford – String Arrangement (2), Strings (2)
- Chris Storr – Trumpet (3,12,14), Flugel (3,6,12,14)
- The Stuart Kennedy Orchestra – String Arrangement (13), Strings (13)
- Danny Thompson – Double Bass (10)
- Phil Veacock – Horn Arrangement (3,12,14), Tenor Saxophone (3,12,14), Baritone Saxophone (3,12,14)
- Alistair White – Trombone (3,12,14)
- White Label – String Arrangement (12), Horn Arrangement (12)

== Charts ==
Chart (2018)	Peak position
Australian Albums (ARIA)	111
Australian Digital Albums (ARIA)	39
Austrian Albums (Ö3 Austria)	28
Belgian Albums (Ultratop Flanders)	17
Belgian Albums (Ultratop Wallonia)	75
Dutch Albums (Album Top 100)	61
German Albums (Offizielle Top 100)	19
Hungarian Albums (MAHASZ)	40
Irish Albums (IRMA)	10
Italian Albums (FIMI)	29
Scottish Albums (Official Charts)	1
Spanish Albums (PROMUSICAE)	38
Swiss Albums (Schweizer Hitparade)	51
UK Albums (Official Charts)	2

=== Year-end charts ===
Chart (2018)	Position
UK Albums (OCC)	90
