= More Modern Classics =

Compilation album by Paul Weller
- Released: 2014
- Genre: Rock
- Length: 1:03:06
- Label: Virgin EMI Records; Harvest Records (US)
- Producer: Paul Weller, Brendon Lynch, Simon Dine, Jan Kybert, Charles Rees

Paul Weller chronology
Sonik Kicks (2012)	More Modern Classics (2014)	Saturns Pattern (2015)

More Modern Classics is a compilation album of music by English singer-songwriter Paul Weller, originally released in 2014. The album was released in three versions: 1 disc CD compilation, a vinyl edition and a 3 disc CD "deluxe" edition.

The album spent 5 weeks on the UK Album Chart, peaking at number 6 in June 2014.

== Track listing ==
All titles written by Paul Weller except where noted

=== Deluxe Edition Disc 1 / Standard Edition ===
No.	Title	Writer(s)	Length
1.	"He's The Keeper"		3:40
2.	"Sweet Pea, My Sweet Pea"		4:08
3.	"It's Written in the Stars"	Paul Weller, Simon Dine	3:10
4.	"Wishing on a Star"	Billie Rae Calvin	3:30
5.	"From The Floorboards Up"		2:28
6.	"Come On / Let's Go"		3:00
7.	"Wild Blue Yonder"		3:29
8.	"Have You Made Up Your Mind"		3:17
9.	"Echoes Round The Sun"	Paul Weller, Noel Gallagher	3:05
10.	"All I Wanna Do (Is Be With You)"		3:35
11.	"Push It Along"	Paul Weller, Simon Dine	2:56
12.	"22 Dreams"	Paul Weller, Simon Dine	2:49
13.	"No Tears To Cry"	Paul Weller, Simon Dine	2:25
14.	"Wake Up The Nation"	Paul Weller, Simon Dine	2:19
15.	"Fast Car / Slow Traffic"	Paul Weller, Simon Dine	1:58
16.	"Starlite"	Paul Weller, Simon Dine	3:42
17.	"That Dangerous Age"	Paul Weller, Simon Dine	2:31
18.	"When Your Garden's Overgrown"	Paul Weller, Simon Dine	3:09
19.	"The Attic"	Paul Weller, Simon Dine	2:15
20.	"Flame-Out!"		3:02
21.	"Brand New Toy"		2:50

=== Deluxe Edition Disc 2 ===
1. Frightened
2. With Time And Temperance
3. A Bullet For Everyone
4. One X One
5. Don't Make Promises
6. One Way Road
7. Birds
8. Blink And You'll Miss It
9. Roll Along Summer
10. The Pebble and the Boy
11. Empty Ring
12. Why Walk When You Can Run
13. Night Lights
14. 7 & 3 Is The Striker's Name
15. Trees
16. Up The Dosage
17. Green
18. Paperchase
19. Be Happy Children
20. The Olde Original

=== Deluxe Edition Disc 3 ===
1. All I Wanna Do (Is Be With You)
2. From The Floorboards Up
3. The Attic
4. Around The Lake
5. Andromeda
6. That Dangerous Age
7. When Your Garden's Overgrown
8. Wake Up The Nation
9. Savages
10. Time of the Season
11. Aim High
12. Daydream
