= Songs for the Road =

Studio album by David Ford
- Released: August 5, 2007
- Recorded: 2006–2007
- Genre: Singer-songwriter
- Length: 37:15
- Label: Independiente Records
- Producer: David Ford

David Ford chronology
I Sincerely Apologise for All the Trouble I've Caused (2005)	Songs for the Road (2007)	Let the Hard Times Roll (2010)

Professional ratings
Review scores
Source	Rating
AbsolutePunk.net	83% link
allgigs.co.uk	link
The Sunday Times	link

Songs for the Road is the second solo album by singer-songwriter David Ford, released as a digital download in August 2007. The physical release was released on October 15, 2007. A charts website listed "Decimate" as a chart-topper in Croatia, but has been debated as the single was never released as a single in that country, and may have been a radio-voting chart instead. Ford released his version of The Smiths' "There Is a Light That Never Goes Out" as a bonus track.

== Track listing ==
All songs written by David Ford.

1. Go to Hell
2. Decimate
3. I'm Alright Now
4. Song For The Road
5. Train
6. St. Peter
7. Nobody Tells Me What To Do
8. Requiem
9. ...And So You Fell
10. There Is A Light (Hidden Track)
11. Shame, Not Regret (Hidden Track)
