= State of the Union (song) =

"State Of The Union"

Single by David Ford
- Released: 2005
- Label: Independiente Records

"State Of The Union" is the debut single from British singer-songwriter David Ford. It had previously been featured as a demo on his official website, before appearing as a track on a CD entitled "Apology Demos EP," only on sale at live shows.

The song was released as a single in the United Kingdom on 26 September 2005 on CD/7" formats through Independiente Records and preceded his debut album I Sincerely Apologise For All The Trouble I've Caused. The music video received numerous plaudits for its originality. It was recorded live-in-one-take, with David, using a looping machine, playing all 12 instruments used in the song.

"State Of The Union" has been described as a "rant about lying politicians", and Ford himself has described it as "a song about greed and politics and war and power, where we've been and where we're going". It is a popular live track for Ford.

== Track listing ==
=== CD ===
1. "State Of The Union"
2. "A Short Song About Shoes"
3. "A Short Song About Stars"
4. "State Of The Union" (video)

=== 7" ===
1. "State Of The Union"
2. "A Short Song About Shoes"
