= Beibei Wang =

Chinese musician

Beibei Wang 王贝贝
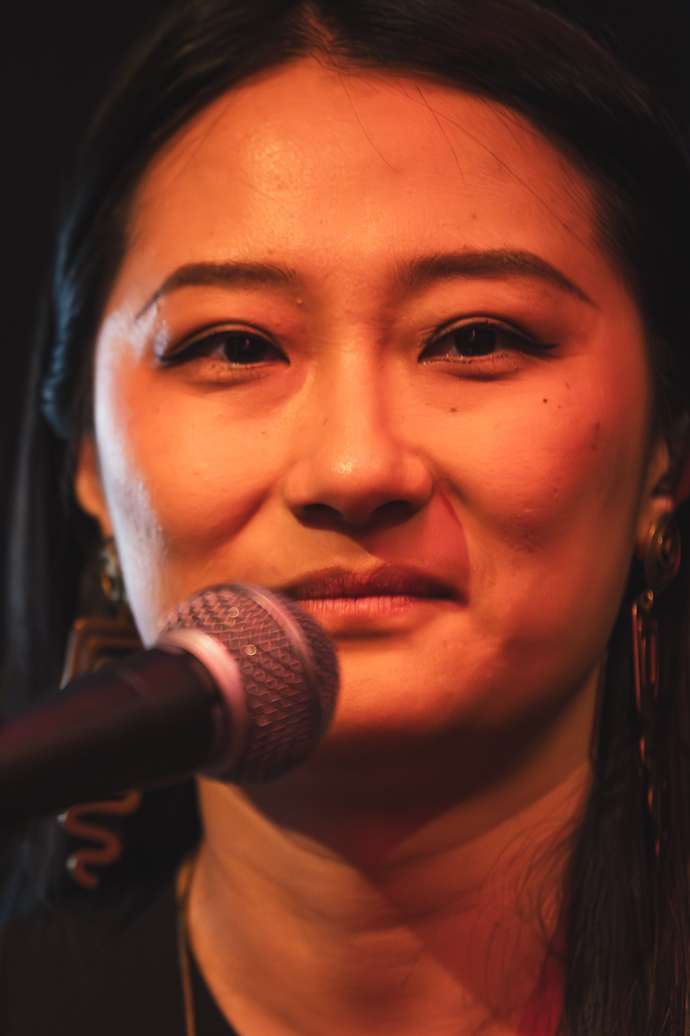
- Wang in 2026

Background information
- Born: 1986 (age 39–40); Hefei, China
- Occupation: Musician
- Instrument: Percussion

Beibei Wang (Chinese: 王贝贝; pinyin: Wáng Bèibèi) is a Chinese percussionist living in London. She has been a soloist with the BBC Concert Orchestra and BBC Symphony Orchestra, among others. She was a jury member for the BBC Young Musician competition.

== Early life and education ==
Beibei Wang grew up in Hefei, China. She received her bachelor's and master's degrees in Chinese percussion performance from the Central Conservatory of Music, Beijing and in 2011, moved to London, United Kingdom to pursue her master's in percussion performance at the Royal Academy of Music.

== Career ==
In 2008, Beibei Wang made her debut performance as a primary percussionist performing Tea: A Mirror of Soul by Chinese-American composer Tan Dun. In 2009, she performed the world premiere of Tan's Earth Concerto at the 2009 Grafenegg Festival with conductor Kristjan Järvi and the Tonkünstler Orchestra. In 2018, Wang featured as soloist performing Tan Dun's Tears of Nature percussion concerto with the BBC Concert Orchestra and conductor Barry Wordsworth on their 2018 China Tour.

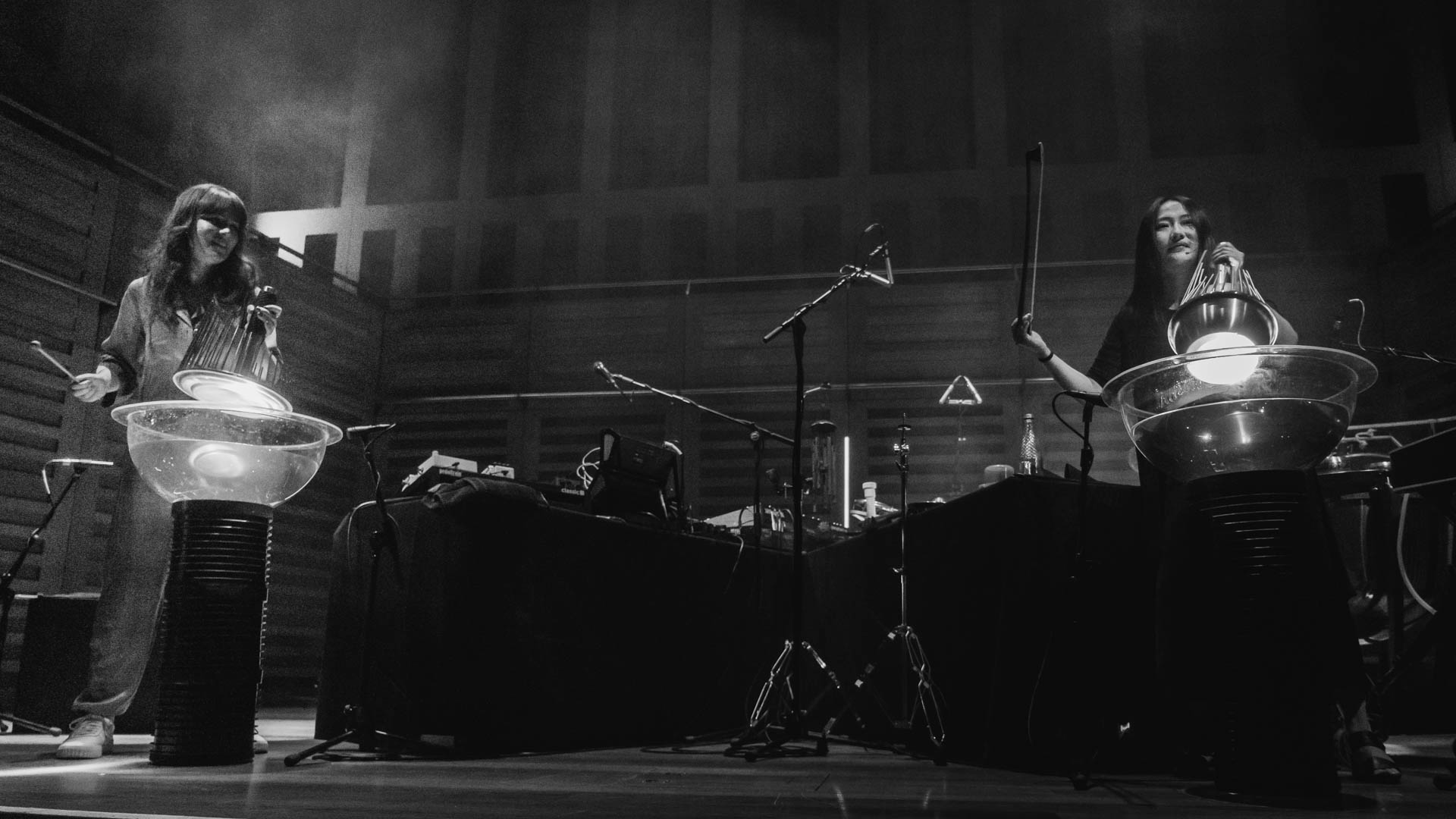
Hannah Peel & Beibei Wang in concert in 2023

In 2009, Wang made her debut with the BBC Symphony Orchestra, performing the UK premiere of Tang Jianping's marimba concerto, Sacred Fire, at the Barbican Centre. She has performed with international orchestras including the Mahler Chamber Orchestra, Orchestra dell'Accademia Nazionale di Santa Cecilia, Toronto Symphony Orchestra, Stuttgarter Philharmoniker, MDR Leipzig Radio Symphony Orchestra, China Philharmonic Orchestra, Antwerp Symphony Orchestra, and at festivals such as the Edinburgh International Festival, Lucerne Festival, and Malta International Arts Festival.

In 2021 and 2022, Wang performed in two tours with contemporary classical ensemble Manchester Collective.

In 2022, Wang was a jury member for the percussion final of the 2022 BBC Young Musician competition.

== Discography ==
Year	Title	Artists	Label
2019	4 Seasonings	As You Hear, Veryan Weston, Pei Ann Yeoh, Beibei Wang	Fundacja Słuchaj!
2026	The Endless Dance	Hannah Peel & Beibei Wang	Real World Records
