= Fat Pop (Volume 1) =

Studio album by Paul Weller
- Released: 14 May 2021
- Recorded: 2020
- Studios: Black Barn Studios, Surrey
- Length: 38:40
- Labels: Polydor; Solid Bond

Paul Weller chronology
On Sunset (2020)	Fat Pop (Volume 1) (2021)	66 (2024)

Singles from Fat Pop (Volume 1)
- 1. "Cosmic Fringes" Released: 24 February 2021; 2. "Glad Times" Released: 12 March 2021; 3. "Shades of Blue" Released: 7 April 2021; 4. "Cosmic Fringes (Remixes)" Released: 23 July 2021; 5. "Glad Times (Soul Steppers)" Released: 1 October 2021; 6. "The Meeq vs. Fat Pop" Released: 1 October 2021

Fat Pop (Volume 1) is the sixteenth solo studio album by English singer-songwriter Paul Weller. It was released on 14 May 2021 through Polydor Records and Solid Bond, in both a standard and deluxe edition. It was supported by the single "Shades of Blue".

== Critical reception ==
Professional ratings
Aggregate scores
Source	Rating
Metacritic	82/100
Review scores
Source	Rating
AllMusic	4/5 stars
American Songwriter	3.5/5 stars
Clash	7/10
Financial Times	3/5 stars
The Guardian	3/5 stars
i	3/5 stars
The Line of Best Fit	6/10
musicOMH	3.5/5 stars
NME	4/5 stars
RTÉ	4/5 stars

On Metacritic, the album has a score of 82 out of 100 from 10 critical reviews, indicating "universal acclaim".

== Commercial performance ==
Fat Pop (Volume 1) debuted at number one on the UK Albums Chart dated 21 May 2021 with over 26,000 chart sales, becoming Weller's sixth solo UK number one album.

== Track listing ==
Fat Pop (Volume 1) track listing
No.	Title	Writer(s)	Producer(s)	Length
1.	"Cosmic Fringes"	Paul Weller	P. Weller; Charles Rees^{[a]}	2:20
2.	"True" (featuring Lia Metcalfe)	P. Weller; Lia Metcalfe	P. Weller; Jan Kybert; Rees^{[a]}	2:07
3.	"Fat Pop"	P. Weller; Kybert	P. Weller; Kybert; Rees^{[a]}	3:19
4.	"Shades of Blue"	P. Weller; Leah Weller	P. Weller; Kybert; Rees^{[a]}	3:06
5.	"Glad Times"	P. Weller; Tom Doyle; Anthony Brown	P. Weller; Kybert; White Label; Rees^{[a]}	4:03
6.	"Cobweb / Connections"	P. Weller	P. Weller; Kybert; Rees^{[a]}	2:56
7.	"Testify"	P. Weller; Andy Fairweather Low	Weller; Kybert; Rees^{[a]}	2:53
8.	"That Pleasure"	P. Weller	Weller; Kybert; Rees^{[a]}	3:32
9.	"Failed"	P. Weller	P. Weller; Kybert	2:43
10.	"Moving Canvas"	P. Weller	P. Weller; Kybert	2:54
11.	"In Better Times"	P. Weller	P. Weller; Kybert; Rees^{[a]}	4:47
12.	"Still Glides the Stream"	P. Weller; Steve Cradock	P. Weller; Kybert; Rees^{[a]}	4:07
Total length:				38:40

Deluxe edition bonus tracks
No.	Title	Writer(s)	Producer(s)	Length
13.	"On Sunset" (Live from Mid-Sömmer Musik)	P. Weller
14.	"Old Father Tyme" (Live from Mid-Sömmer Musik)	P. Weller
15.	"Moving Canvas" (Live from Mid-Sömmer Musik)	P. Weller
16.	"Failed" (Live from Mid-Sömmer Musik)	P. Weller
17.	"Village" (Live from Mid-Sömmer Musik)	P. Weller; Kybert
18.	"More" (Live from Mid-Sömmer Musik)	P. Weller
19.	"Testify" (Live from Mid-Sömmer Musik)	P. Weller; Low
20.	"Still Glides the Stream" (Live from Mid-Sömmer Musik)	P. Weller; Cradock
21.	"Rockets" (Live from Mid-Sömmer Musik)	P. Weller
22.	"Mayfly" (Live from Mid-Sömmer Musik)	P. Weller
23.	"Round the Floor"	P. Weller	P. Weller; Kybert
24.	"Serafina"	P. Weller	P. Weller; Kybert
25.	"Crowboy"	P. Weller; James Skelly	P. Weller; Kybert
26.	"Into the Sea"	P. Weller	P. Weller; Kybert
27.	"Pure Sound"	P. Weller	P. Weller
28.	"Fat Mix"	P. Weller	P. Weller; Kybert

Notes

- ^{^[a]} indicates an additional producer

== Personnel ==
Musicians

- Paul Weller – vocals (all tracks), acoustic guitar (1–4, 6, 7, 9–12, 23–28), background vocals (1–12, 23, 25, 27), drums (1, 28), electric guitar (1, 3–5, 8–10, 27, 28), percussion (1, 4, 6–8, 10, 23, 25), piano (1–4, 6–8, 10–12, 23, 26, 28), Mellotron (2, 5, 8, 23, 25, 27, 28), bass (3, 8, 10, 27), Hammond organ (3, 6–8, 10, 11), clapping (6, 10), Rhodes (10, 28), harp (11, 27), guitar (13–22), Wurlitzer electric piano (27, 28), synthesizer (28)
- Charles Rees – drum programming (1), synthesizer (1, 3, 28), Moog bass (5), synth bass (5), Hammond organ (25), Mellotron (25, 28); percussion, sound effects (28)
- Steve Cradock – electric guitar (1, 7–9, 11, 23, 25, 28); harp, percussion, timpani, tubular bells (4, 10, 12); acoustic guitar (6, 25, 26), bass (10, 12), string arrangement (12), guitar (13–22), lap steel guitar (23), slide guitar (25)
- Andy Crofts – background vocals (2, 4, 6–12, 25), bass (2, 6–11, 13–15, 25), electric guitar, keyboards, melodica, timpani (4); clapping (6), synthesizer (9), acoustic bass guitar (11); guitar, organ, zither (23)
- Paul Speare – baritone saxophone (2, 10, 12, 28)
- Ben Gordelier – drums (2–5, 7–12, 23, 25, 27, 28), percussion (3–5, 7, 8, 10–12, 23, 25, 28), clapping (10)
- Steve Trigg – horn arrangement (2, 5, 7, 10, 12, 28), trumpet (2, 5, 10, 12, 28)
- Anthony Gaylard – tenor saxophone (2, 10, 12, 28)
- Dave Boraston – trumpet (2, 5, 10, 12, 28)
- Lia Metcalfe – vocals (2)
- Tom Heel – background vocals (3, 4, 7, 8, 10–23, 25, 27), Moog bass (3)
- Jan Kybert – Hammond organ (3), programming (3, 8), synthesizer (3, 28), percussion (6); Mellotron, sound effects (28)
- Leah Weller – background vocals (4)
- Tom Doyle – drum programming, keyboards, Wurlitzer electric piano (5)
- Anthony Brown – electric guitar (5)
- Paraorchestra – orchestra (5, 8, 12)
- Paul Wright – sarangi (5)
- Hannah Peel – conducting and string arrangements (5, 6, 8, 12, 23, 24, 28)
- White Label – string arrangement (5)
- Steve Pilgrim – background vocals (6, 7, 10–12), drums (6, 13–22, 28); clapping, conga (10); acoustic guitar (11, 28); electric guitar, piano (11)
- Katy Cox – cello (6, 24, 28)
- Stella Page – viola (6, 24, 28)
- Antonia Pagulatos – violin (6, 24, 28)
- Kotono Sato – violin (6, 24, 28)
- Andy Fairweather Low – vocals, background vocals (7)
- Jacko Peake – flute (7, 12–15); soprano saxophone, tenor saxophone (7)
- Steve Brookes – slide guitar (9)
- Phil Veacock – saxophone (11)

Technical

- Matt Colton – mastering
- Jan Kybert – mixing (1–12, 23–28)
- Charles Rees – mixing (13–22), engineering (1–22), editing (1–12, 23–28)
- Fiona Cruickshank – engineering (5, 8, 12)

== Charts ==
Chart performance for Fat Pop (Volume 1)
Chart (2021)	Peak position
Austrian Albums (Ö3 Austria)	21
Belgian Albums (Ultratop Flanders)	15
Belgian Albums (Ultratop Wallonia)	51
Dutch Albums (Album Top 100)	47
German Albums (Offizielle Top 100)	8
Irish Albums (Official Charts)	2
Italian Albums (FIMI)	74
Japanese Albums (Oricon)	36
Scottish Albums (Official Charts)	1
Swedish Physical Albums (Sverigetopplistan)	14
Swiss Albums (Schweizer Hitparade)	69
UK Albums (Official Charts)	1
