= Kill the Last Romantic =

Studio album by easyworld
- Released: 2 February 2004
- Recorded: Summer 2003
- Genre: Indie rock
- Label: Jive

Easyworld chronology
This is Where I Stand (2002)	Kill the Last Romantic (2004)

Professional ratings
Review scores
Source	Rating
Drowned In Sound	(2/10)

Kill the Last Romantic was an album released by Eastbourne-based English indie-rock 3-piece Easyworld in 2004. It yielded two singles - "2nd Amendment" and "'Til the Day", though the label specified that the third single would have to be a newly written song, as there were no others on the album which the label deemed suitable for release, thereby leading to the release of the band's final single, "How Did It Ever Come to This?".

Though the source of their most successful single ("'Til the Day" entered the UK Singles Chart at #27), the album lacked both the critical acclaim afforded to their first full-length album ("This Is Where I Stand") and the commercial success anticipated by the Sony/BMG and much of the fan base alike.

Following the decision of Sony/BMG to terminate the band's contract, along with lead singer/guitarist David Ford's decision to pursue a solo career, the album was re-released in order to complete the band's record deal.

== Track listing ==
1. Kill the Last Romantic
2. 2nd Amendment
3. Drive
4. 'Til the Day
5. A Lot of Miles From Home
6. Celebritykiller
7. All I Can Remember
8. Tonight
9. When You Come Back, I Won't Be Here
10. Saddest Song
11. You Have Been Here
12. Goodnight

A limited edition 2 disc version was also available containing the following alternate version bonus tracks:

1. A Lot Of Miles From Home (At The Gates Of Hell)
2. 'til The Day (In The Saloon)
3. Celebritykiller (At The Copa)
4. All I Can Remember (At The Cooking Sherry Again)
5. 2nd Amendment (On The Soapbox)
6. You Have Been Here (In A Spaghetti Western)
7. When You Come Back I Won't Be Here (On A Casio)
