= Saturns Pattern =

Studio album by Paul Weller
- Released: 18 May 2015
- Genre: Alternative rock; hard rock; neo-psychedelia
- Label: Parlophone, Warner Bros. Records
- Producer: Paul Weller; Jan "Stan" Kybert; Amorphous Androgynous

Paul Weller chronology
More Modern Classics (2014)	Saturns Pattern (2015)	A Kind Revolution (2017)

Singles from Saturns Pattern
- 1. "White Sky" Released: 11 February 2015; 2. "Saturns Pattern" Released: 11 May 2015; 3. "Going My Way" Released: 24 July 2015; 4. "I'm Where I Should Be" Released: 9 October 2015; 5. "Pick it Up" Released: 18 December 2015

Professional ratings
Aggregate scores
Source	Rating
Metacritic	81/100
Review scores
Source	Rating
DIY	3/5 stars
The Guardian	5/5 stars
The Independent	5/5 stars
NME	7/10
Q	4/5 stars
The Telegraph	4/5 stars
Uncut	4.5/5 stars

Saturns Pattern is the twelfth solo album by English singer-songwriter and musician Paul Weller, released on 18 May 2015. The album reached number two on the UK Albums Chart.

== Track listing ==
All tracks composed by Paul Weller and Jan Stan Kybert; except where indicated

No.	Title	Length
1.	"White Sky"	4:56
2.	"Saturns Pattern"	3:24
3.	"Going My Way"	4:15
4.	"Long Time"	2:12
5.	"Pick It Up"	6:16
6.	"I'm Where I Should Be"	3:26
7.	"Phoenix"	5:56
8.	"In the Car..."	4:44
9.	"These City Streets"	8:24
Total length:		43.31

Deluxe edition bonus tracks
No.	Title	Length
10.	"(I'm A) Roadrunner"	2:48
11.	"Dusk Til Dawn"	2:04
12.	"White Sky" (Prof. Kybert vs. The Moons Remix)	4:36

Japanese bonus tracks
No.	Title	Length
13.	"I Work in the Clouds"	5:39
14.	"Praise If You Wanna"	1:39

== Personnel ==
- Paul Weller - Vocals (1,2,3,4,5,6,7,8,9), Acoustic Guitar (3,6,7,8), Electric Guitars (1,2,3,4,6,8), Guitars (5,9), Bass (1,5,6,7,8,9), Piano (2,3,6,7,8), Hammond Organ (1,8), Rhodes (7), Mellotron (9), Philicorda (7), Keyboards (5,6), Synths (4), Moog (3), Harmonica (2), Percussion (2), Hand Claps (3), Finger Snaps (3), Strings (9), Backing Vocals (1,3,5,6,7)
- The Amorphous Androgynous - Programming and Psychedelicization of Synths, Tape Loops, Drums, Harp, Strings, Guitar (1)
- Syd Arthur - Backing Vocals (5)
- Steve Brookes - Electric Guitar (9), Slide Guitar (8)
- Raven Bush - Violin (9)
- Steve Cradock - Electric Guitar (7), Guitars (5,9), Moog (9)
- Andy Crofts - Electric Guitar (1), Bass (3), Piano (3), Mellotron (2), Keyboards (5,8,9), Keys (2), Moog (2), Backing Vocals (1,3,5,6,7,8,9)
- Ben Gordelier - Drums (1,2,3,5,6,7,8,9), Percussion (3,7,8)
- Jan Stan Kybert - Electric Guitar (6), Bass (2), Keyboards (5,6), Moog (9), Programming (2,6)
- Josh McClorey - Slide Guitar (4)
- Steve Pilgrim - Backing Vocals (2)
- Charles Rees - Bass (4), Egg Whisk (4)
- Stuart Rowe - Electric Guitar (1)
- Tom Van Heel - Drums (4)
- Hannah Weller - Backing Vocals (1,5,7)
- Bill Wheeler - Guitar (4)

== Charts ==
Chart (2015)	Peak position
Australian Albums (ARIA)	58
Austrian Albums (Ö3 Austria)	58
Belgian Albums (Ultratop Flanders)	30
Belgian Albums (Ultratop Wallonia)	97
Dutch Albums (Album Top 100)	22
German Albums (Offizielle Top 100)	35
Hungarian Albums (MAHASZ)	6
Italian Albums (FIMI)	33
Scottish Albums (OCC)	2
Swiss Albums (Schweizer Hitparade)	83
UK Albums (OCC)	2
UK Album Downloads (OCC)	9
US Top Rock Albums (Billboard)	37

== See also ==
- Saturn's hexagon
