= On Sunset =

Studio album by Paul Weller
- Released: 3 July 2020
- Studio: Black Barn Studios, Surrey
- Length: 47:53
- Label: Polydor
- Producer: Paul Weller; Jan Kybert

Paul Weller chronology
True Meanings (2018)	On Sunset (2020)	Fat Pop (Volume 1) (2021)

Singles from On Sunset
- 1. "Earth Beat" Released: 18 March 2020; 2. "Village" Released: 7 May 2020; 3. "More" Released: 24 June 2020

On Sunset is the fifteenth studio album by English singer-songwriter Paul Weller. It was originally scheduled for release on 12 June 2020, but was delayed until 3 July 2020 due to the COVID-19 pandemic.

It was the first album in several years to feature Weller's former Style Council bandmate Mick Talbot, who played on several tracks.

== Critical reception ==
Professional ratings
Aggregate scores
Source	Rating
Metacritic	82/100
Review scores
Source	Rating
AllMusic	3.5/5 stars
The Guardian	4/5 stars
The Independent	4/5 stars

On Sunset was met with universal acclaim reviews from critics. At Metacritic, which assigns a weighted average rating out of 100 to reviews from mainstream publications, this release received an average score of 84, based on 5 reviews.

Stephen Thomas Erlewine of AllMusic proclaimed that On Sunset felt "fresh" and "distinctly belonging to Weller".

== Track listing ==
On Sunset track listing
No.	Title	Length
1.	"Mirror Ball"	7:36
2.	"Baptiste"	3:05
3.	"Old Father Tyme"	3:56
4.	"Village"	3:20
5.	"More"	6:54
6.	"On Sunset"	6:34
7.	"Equanimity"	3:54
8.	"Walkin'"	3:56
9.	"Earth Beat"	4:18
10.	"Rockets"	4:20
Total length:		47:53

Apple Music and Spotify deluxe edition
No.	Title	Length
11.	"4th Dimension"	5:35
12.	"Ploughman"	3:14
13.	"I'll Think of Something"	4:06
14.	"On Sunset" (orchestral mix)	3:59
15.	"Baptiste" (instrumental)	3:07

Japanese Edition
No.	Title	Length
16.	"Failed"	2:55
Total length:		70:58

"Failed" was later re-recorded for the album Fat Pop (Volume 1).

== Musicians ==
- Paul Weller - Lead Vocal (1–10), Backing Vocal (1–10), Electric Guitar (1–6,8–10), Acoustic Guitar (1,3–7,10), Piano (1–5,7–10), Rhodes (1,4,8,9), Synths (1,8,9), Mellotron (1,5,7,8,10), Mad Hammond (1,7,10), Percussion (2,5), Bass (3–5,8,9), Mellotron Vibes (3,4,6), Claps (3,5), Wurly (4), Mellotron Strings (4), Monotron (4), Samples (8), Electric Sitar (9), Philicorda (9), Hammond Organ (9)
- Dave Boraston - Trumpet (3,5)
- Steve Brookes - Lead Guitar (2), Electric Guitar (8)
- Col3trane - Additional Vocal (9)
- Steve Cradock - Electric Guitar (1,6,7,10), Acoustic Guitar (1), Moog (1)
- Andy Crofts - Bass (1,2,6,7,10), Moog (1,6), Backing Vocals (1,6–9), Mellotron (2,8)
- Izzi Dunn - Cello (5), Backing Vocals (5)
- Anthony Gaylard - Tenor Saxophone (3,5)
- Ben Gordelier - Drums (1–10), Percussion (1–10), Drum Programming (3), Electric Guitar (9)
- Julie Gros - Lead Vocals (5), Backing Vocals (5)
- Jessamy Holder - Baritone Saxophone (2,6–8,10)
- Jim Jupp - Synths (9)
- Jan Stan Kybert - Drum Programming (1,3–5), Keys Programming (1), Glockenspiel (1), Sound Effects (1,2,4,8–10), Claps (3,5), Loops (4), Synth Bass (4), Yak (5), Synths (8,9), Bells (8), Bass Synths (9), Canon (10), Drum Fills (10)
- Jim Lea - Violin (7)
- Magic Mod - Claps (3)
- Josh McClorey - Electric Guitar (5), Acoustic Guitar (5)
- Stella Page - Viola (5), Backing Vocals (5)
- Antonio Pagulatos - Violin (5), Backing Vocals (5)
- Paraorchestra - Orchestra (4,9,10)
- Hannah Peel - Orchestrations and Conducting (4,5,6,9,10,14 - Deluxe edition)
- Steve Pilgrim - Acoustic Guitar (1), Backing Vocals (1)
- Charles Rees - Eminent Organ (1), Moog (3), Mad Hammond (5), Ambient FX (10)
- Andy Ross - Backward Flute (5), Flute (6)
- Kotono Sato - Violin (5), Backing Vocals (5)
- Paul Speare - Flute (3,5)
- The Staves (credited as Camilla Staveley-Taylor, Emily Staveley-Taylor and Jessica Staveley-Taylor) - Backing Vocals (6,8,9)
- Chris Storr - Trumpet (2,6–8,10), Flugel (6), Post Horn (8)
- Mick Talbot - Hammond Organ (2,4,8)
- John Thirkell - Trumpet (6–8,10), Flugel (6)
- Lee Thompson - Saxophone Solo (8)
- Steve Trigg - Trumpet (3,5)
- Tom Van Heel - Piano (1), Backing Vocals (1,8,9), Drum Fills (8)
- Phil Veacock - Tenor Saxophone (2,6–8,10), Soprano Saxophone (7), Clarinet (7)
- Alistair White - Trombone (2,6–8,10), Bass Trombone (7), Euphonium (7)

== Charts ==
Chart performance for On Sunset
Chart (2020)	Peak position
Australian Albums (ARIA)	96
Austrian Albums (Ö3 Austria)	20
Belgian Albums (Ultratop Flanders)	15
Belgian Albums (Ultratop Wallonia)	50
Dutch Albums (Album Top 100)	30
French Albums (SNEP)	152
German Albums (Offizielle Top 100)	11
Irish Albums (OCC)	4
Italian Albums (FIMI)	81
Japan Hot Albums (Billboard Japan)	57
Japan Top Albums Sales (Billboard Japan)	20
Japanese Albums (Oricon)	24
Scottish Albums (OCC)	1
Spanish Albums (PROMUSICAE)	40
Swiss Albums (Schweizer Hitparade)	15
UK Albums (OCC)	1
