= Let the Hard Times Roll =

Studio album by David Ford
- Released: February 15, 2010
- Recorded: 2009
- Genre: Singer-songwriter
- Length: 44:42
- Producer: David Ford

David Ford chronology
Songs for the Road (2007)	Let the Hard Times Roll (2010)	Charge (2013)

Let the Hard Times Roll is the third solo album by singer-songwriter David Ford, released on February 15, 2010.

== Track listing ==
All songs written by David Ford.

1. Panic
2. Making Up For Lost Time
3. Waiting for the Storm
4. Surfin' Guantanamo Bay
5. To Hell with the World
6. Stephen
7. Nothing at All
8. Sylvia
9. Meet Me in the Middle
10. Missouri
11. She's Not The One
12. Hurricane
13. Call To Arms
