= Charge (David Ford album) =

Studio album by David Ford
- Released: March 18, 2013
- Recorded: 2013
- Genre: Singer-songwriter
- Length: 42:05
- Producer: David Ford

David Ford chronology
Let The Hard Times Roll (2010)	Charge (2013)

Charge is the fourth solo album by singer-songwriter David Ford, released on March 18, 2013.

== Track listing ==
All songs written by David Ford.

1. Pour a Little Poison
2. The Ballad of Miss Lily
3. Isn't It Strange?
4. Let It Burn
5. Philadelphia Boy
6. Moving On
7. What's Not to Love?
8. Perfect Soul
9. Throwaway
10. Every Time
