= Easyworld =

English band

- Easyworld, from left to right: Glenn Hooper, David Ford and Jo Taylor,

Background information
- Origin: Eastbourne, East Sussex, England
- Genres: Alternative rock Indie; Rock
- Years active: 1997–2004
- Labels: Fierce Panda Records; Jive Records; Sony BMG Music Entertainment
- Past members: David Ford; Jo Taylor; Glenn Hooper
- Website: Official Website

Easyworld were an English indie alternative rock/pop band hailing from Eastbourne, consisting of David Ford on vocals, Jo Taylor on bass and Glenn Hooper on drums, active between 1997 and 2004. The band achieved limited success in the early 2000s, releasing 3 albums in total; Better Ways to Self Destruct, This Is Where I Stand and Kill the Last Romantic on Fierce Panda Records and Jive Records before parting ways in August 2004.

== History ==
=== Formation, early years and Better Ways To Self Destruct ===
Throughout the mid-1990s, Ford and Glenn Hooper played together in several small rock bands such as Sweater, Sixteen & Sheadly. After one Sheadly gig, bassist Jo Taylor approached the band and told them that they needed her to play as their current bassist wasn't up to scratch.

A few years passed, Sheadly had split and once again Ford and Hooper were on the look out for new band members, placing adverts for members in the window of their local music store. In a twist of fate, Jo Taylor picked up the advertisement, and the band 'Beachy Head' were formed.

After recording a few rough demos and an unreleased album, the trio re-christened the band 'Easyworld', after a lyric in their song "Better Ways To Self Destruct". The band signed to Fierce Panda and released their debut E.P., also titled Better Ways to Self Destruct even though it did not feature the song of that name, in 2001. The E.P. was preceded by the single "Hundredweight".

=== Jive Records and This Is Where I Stand (2002-2003) ===
The band signed to Jive Records in the fall of 2001 and released two albums, This Is Where I Stand and Kill the Last Romantic before splitting in 2004.

The band eventually split in 2004, before the split the band's label Jive was taken over by BMG and the band were due to re-release Kill the Last Romantic with "How Did it Ever Come to This?" being an additional track, with a promotional campaign being set up. However, BMG were not too keen on the band's commercial position and were due to drop them, which later prompted their split, which was revealed to Ford, when he wrote a letter to them saying he was not happy and wanted the contract cancelled.

== Discography ==
=== Studio albums ===
1. Better Ways to Self Destruct (mini album) (2001)
2. This Is Where I Stand (2002)
3. Kill the Last Romantic (2004)

=== DVDs ===
1. I Don't Expect You To Notice (2005)

=== Single releases ===
Single/EP	Release date	Label	Format(s)	UK Singles Chart Position	Notes
"Hundredweight"	19 February 2001	Fierce Panda Records	CD, 7"	-	Accompanied by b-sides: "All I Ever Had", "U Make Me Want To Drink Bleach"
"Try Not to Think"	11 March 2002	Jive Records	CD, 7"	-	Accompanied by b-sides: "Everyone Knows", "She's Something Else"
"Bleach"	20 May 2002	Jive Records	CD, 7"	67	Accompanied by b-sides: "Lights Out", "People Who Don't Climb Ladders (Aren't Particularly Likely To Fall Off Ladders Now, Are They?"
"You & Me"	9 September 2002	Jive Records	2xCD, 7"	57	Accompanied by b-sides: "Better Ways To Self Destruct", "Little Sensation", "Hopelessly Devoted To You", "Right Thing"
"Junkies"	27 January 2003	Jive Records	2xCD, 7"	40	Accompanied by b-sides: "Me", "Junkies" (live acoustic), "Demons" (live acoustic), "People Who Don't Climb Ladders (Aren't Particularly Likely To Fall Off Ladders Now, Are They?"(live acoustic), "Enjoy The Silence" (Depeche Mode cover)
"2nd Amendment"	6 October 2003	Jive Records	2xCD, 7"	42	Accompanied by b-sides: "Other Man", "A Lot Like...", "Young In Love", "Dave, Where Have You Gone?", "Where Happy Is"
"'Til the Day"	19 January 2004	Jive Records	2xCD, 7"	27	Accompanied by b-sides "Straight To Video", "Heaven Knows You Will", "Luka", "California"
"How Did It Ever Come to This?"	30 August 2004	Zomba / BMG	2xCD, 7"	50	Accompanied by b-sides: "Celebritykiller", "Young Hearts Run Free", "You Can't Tear Polaroids", "This Guy's In Love With You"
