= This Is Where I Stand =

Studio album by easyworld
- Released: 3 June 2002
- Recorded: 2001
- Genre: Indie rock
- Label: Jive

Easyworld chronology
Better Ways to Self Destruct (2001)	This Is Where I Stand (2002)	Kill the Last Romantic (2004)

Professional ratings
Review scores
Source	Rating
Allmusic	3/5 stars
Drowned in Sound	5/10

This Is Where I Stand is a 2002 album by Eastbourne-based indie rock trio easyworld. The album contained 4 singles - Try Not To Think, Bleach, You & Me and Junkies, with a considerable growth in commercial success between each, the latter single even managing to reach #40 in the UK charts. Notably, the album included five re-recorded versions of songs that had previously appeared on their first e.p. - Better Ways to Self Destruct.

The album was released in the summer of 2002 to fairly positive, though not overwhelming, critical acclaim, and the band quickly built a dedicated fanbase during this period.

== Track listing ==
1. Armistice
2. Try Not To Think
3. 100 Weight
4. Junkies & Whores
5. This is Where I Stand
6. A Stain To Never Fade
7. Demons
8. By the Sea
9. Bleach
10. You & Me
11. You Were Right
