= Sonik Kicks =

Studio album by Paul Weller
- Released: 19 March 2012
- Recorded: 2010–11
- Studio: Black Barn Studios, Woking, Surrey
- Genre: Rock, alternative rock, electronic rock
- Label: Island
- Producer: Paul Weller; Simon Dine

Paul Weller chronology
Wake Up the Nation (2010)	Sonik Kicks (2012)	More Modern Classics (2014)

Professional ratings
Aggregate scores
Source	Rating
Metacritic	77/100
Review scores
Source	Rating
Allmusic	4.5/5 stars
The A.V. Club	B−
The Guardian	4/5 stars
NME	8/10
Pitchfork	6.5/10
PopMatters	8/10

Sonik Kicks is the eleventh studio album from Paul Weller, an English singer-songwriter and former member of The Jam; it was released on 19 March 2012. The album reached number one on the UK Albums Chart beating David Guetta's Nothing But the Beat to the top spot by just 250 copies.

== Singles ==
"Starlite" was the first single released from the album, as a download and vinyl 12" in August 2011, it reached number 113 in the UK singles chart.

"That Dangerous Age" was released in March 2012 as a CD, vinyl 7" and download, peaking at number 66 in the UK. It was performed live on The Jonathan Ross Show.

"Birthday" was released as a non-album download single in August 2012, peaking at number 64 in the UK singles chart.

== Track listing ==
Standard listing

1. "Green" (Weller, Dine) - 3:03
2. "The Attic" (Weller, Dine) - 2:15
3. "Kling I Klang" (Weller, Dine) - 3:14
4. "Sleep of the Serene" (Weller, Ibrahim, Rees) - 2:00
5. "By The Waters" (Weller, Ibrahim) - 3:29
6. "That Dangerous Age" (Weller, Dine) - 2:30
7. "Study in Blue" (Weller, Dine) - 6:37
8. "Dragonfly" (Paul Weller, Jasmine Weller, Dine) - 3:41
9. "When Your Garden's Overgrown" (Weller, Dine) - 3:11
10. "Around The Lake" (Weller, Dine) - 2:11
11. "Twilight" (Weller, Cradock) - 0:20
12. "Drifters" (Weller, Cradock, Dine) - 3:07
13. "Paperchase" (Weller, Dine) - 5:01
14. "Be Happy Children" (Weller, Dine) - 2:45

Bonus Tracks (Deluxe Edition)

1. "Starlite" (Weller, Dine) - 3:41
2. "Devotion" (Weller) - 4:01

== Personnel ==
- Paul Weller - Lead Vocals, Electric Guitars, Bass, Drums, Piano, Mellotron, Hammond, Farfisa, Moogs, Percussion, Acoustic Guitars, Backing Vocals
- Graham Coxon - Electric Guitars
- Steve Cradock - Electric Guitars, Drums, Acoustic Guitars, Backing Vocals
- Andy Crofts - Electric Guitars, Bass, Acoustic Guitars, Celeste, Vibes, Glockenspiel, Vibraphone, Farfisa, Backing Vocals, String Arrangements
- Simon Dine - Electric Guitars, Loops, FX, Electronic Strings
- Noel Gallagher - Electric Guitars, Bass, Acoustic Guitars
- Ben Gordelier - Drums
- Aziz Ibrahim - Acoustic Guitars
- Jan "Stan" Kybert - Programming
- Andy Lewis - Bass, Celeste, Vibes, Glockenspiel
- Marco Nelson - Bass
- David Nock - Drums
- Roger "Trotwood" Nowell - Bass
- Sean O'Hagan - String Arrangements
- Steve Pilgrim - Drums, Backing Vocals
- Charles Rees - Drums, Percussion
- Hannah Weller - Backing Vocals
- Leah Weller - Backing Vocals
- Mac Weller - Backing Vocals

Technical

- Charles Rees, Jamie Johnson - engineer, recording
- Alex Hutchinson, Paul Weller - design
- Julian Broad - photography

== Charts ==
=== Weekly charts ===
Chart (2012)	Peak position
Austrian Albums (Ö3 Austria)	74
Belgian Albums (Ultratop Flanders)	33
Belgian Albums (Ultratop Wallonia)	81
Dutch Albums (Album Top 100)	60
German Albums (Offizielle Top 100)	57
Italian Albums (FIMI)	60
Scottish Albums (OCC)	3
Spanish Albums (Promusicae)	50
UK Albums (OCC)	1
US Billboard 200	166
US Top Rock Albums (Billboard)	42

=== Year-end charts ===
Chart (2012)	Position
UK Albums (OCC)	149

== Release history ==
Country	Release date	Format(s)
United Kingdom	19 March 2012	CD, vinyl, digital download
