= Andy Crofts =

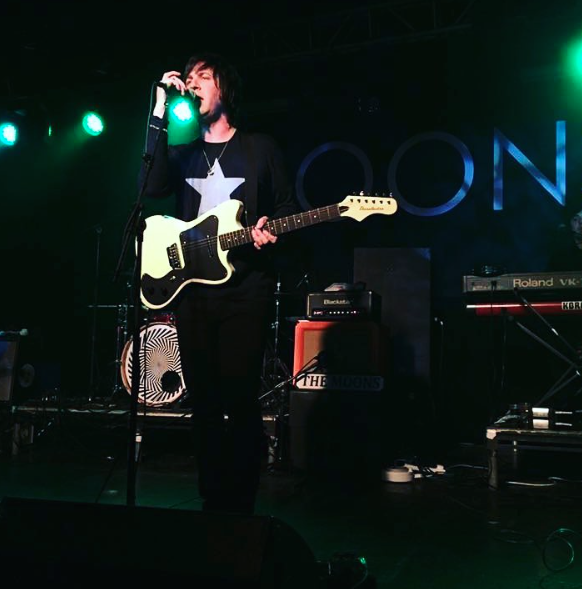
- The Moons live

Background information
- Born: Andrew John Goncalves; 23 March 1977 (age 49); São Paulo, Brazil
- Origin: Northampton, England
- Genres: Alternative rock, indie rock, psychedelic, lo-fi, Britpop
- Occupations: Musician, singer-songwriter, multi-instrumentalist, photographer
- Instruments: Guitar, vocals, bass, drums, piano, organ
- Years active: 2006 – Present
- Labels: Colorama Records, Schnitzel Records, Acid Jazz, Regal
- Website: www.andycrofts.com

Andy Crofts (born Andrew John Goncalves; 23 March 1977) is an English musician, singer-songwriter and photographer. He was the founding member of psychedelic indie rock band The Moons. Crofts is also a photographer and made a documentary film while touring called One and official music video These City Streets and She Moves with the Fayre for musician Paul Weller.

Crofts was a full-time musician for UK solo artist Paul Weller.

== Early life ==
Crofts was an only child born in São Paulo, Brazil. His mother, Jeanne Crofts, was working as a dancer in São Paulo for a Circus known as Circo Tihany.

Around the age of 14 or 15, a friend of Andy's found an acoustic guitar in a skip, and they learned to play on it. This helped ignite Crofts' love for music and inspired him to start writing.

== Career ==
=== The Moons ===
As the group's main songwriter, Crofts is responsible for all of the songwriting and direction of The Moons studio albums: 2010's Life on Earth, 2012's Fables of History and 2014's Mindwaves and 2020's critically acclaimed 'Pocket Melodies'.

Crofts founded The Moons in 2006 after splitting from The On Offs. A collection of songs had gathered that would become Moons songs. In 2008, Crofts took songs to The Lodge Recording Studio in Northampton and arranged to use the studio and pay weekly, since he didn't have funds. Crofts recorded five songs on which he played all instruments except drums. He named his time in the studio the Lunar sessions. These songs caught the attention of Mojo magazine and promoters. His original home demos were initially sent to Paul Weller later earning him a place in the PW band.

In 2010, The Moons released their debut album Life on Earth on Acid Jazz Records, containing 12 Crofts originals including re-worked versions from the Lunar sessions.

In 2014 Crofts wrote an album called Mindwaves that he produced at Black Barn Studios in Woking with help from The Moons drummer Ben Gordelier. Soon after, The Moons recorded a live album from Bush Hall London. The album was limited to 500 copies on vinyl and contained a selection of songs from all 3 studio albums.

=== Paul Weller ===
Crofts joined Paul Weller's band in March 2008 and began touring to promote the 22 Dreams album. Crofts had initially met Paul when supporting him in the former band The on Offs in 2006.

Crofts started as keyboard player for Weller before moving to bass guitar. He is a regular on Weller's studio albums since his 2010 album Wake Up the Nation.

Crofts' studio efforts contain many instruments such as bass guitar, guitar, keyboards, synths and vocals. Crofts even wrote string arrangements despite his lack of classical training.

When Crofts joined the Weller band, he was originally the keyboard player. He played bass guitar on all live shows.

=== Producer ===
Crofts mixes and produces songs for signed and unsigned bands, as well as his own music. He worked with Dutch artist Max Meser on an as yet unreleased album.

Croft's solo album Melody Boy is set to be released in 2026.

== Personal life ==
He currently lives in Worthing, West Sussex with his partner and model Tara Griffin. The couple has two children

He is featured in the Paul Weller music video These City Streets.
