= The Style Council discography =

- Studio albums: 5
- EPs: 6
- Live albums: 2
- Compilation albums: 9
- Singles: 24
- Video albums: 11
- Studio mini albums: 1
- Box sets: 4

This is the discography of British band the Style Council.

== Albums ==
=== Studio albums ===
Title	Album details	Peak chart positions										Certifications
Title	Album details	UK	AUS	AUT	CAN	GER	JPN	NL	NZ	SWE	US	Certifications
Café Bleu (North America title: My Ever Changing Moods)	Released: 16 March 1984; Label: Polydor, Geffen; Formats: CD, LP, MC	2	27	—	43	—	23	16	6	41	56	UK: Gold
Our Favourite Shop (North America title: Internationalists)	Released: 31 May 1985; Label: Polydor, Geffen; Formats: CD, LP. MC	1	5	23	53	23	18	11	6	30	123	UK: Gold
The Cost of Loving	Released: 2 February 1987; Label: Polydor; Formats: CD, LP, MC	2	24	—	58	45	6	23	35	46	122	UK: Gold
Confessions of a Pop Group	Released: 20 June 1988; Label: Polydor; Formats: CD, LP, MC	15	60	—	—	—	9	—	—	—	174	UK: Silver
Modernism: A New Decade	Released: 19 October 1998; Label: Polydor; Formats: LP; Recorded in 1989	—	—	—	—	—	—	—	—	—	—	
"—" denotes releases that did not chart or were not released in that territory.

=== Studio mini album ===
Title	Album details	Peak chart positions				
Title	Album details	AUS	CAN	JPN	NZ	US
Introducing the Style Council	Released: September 1983; Label: Polydor; Formats: CD, LP, MC; Not released in the UK	29	44	69	6	172

=== Live albums ===
Title	Album details	Peak chart positions							Certifications
Title	Album details	UK	AUS	GER	JPN	NL	NZ	SWE	Certifications
Home and Abroad	Released: 1 May 1986; Label: Polydor, Geffen; Formats: CD, LP, MC	8	59	53	34	27	21	36	UK: Silver
The Style Council in Concert	Released: 2 February 1998; Label: Polydor; Formats: CD, MC	150	—	—	—	—	—	—	
"—" denotes releases that did not chart or were not released in that territory.

=== Compilation albums ===
Title	Album details	Peak chart positions				Certifications
Title	Album details	UK	AUS	JPN	NZ	Certifications
The Singular Adventures of the Style Council – Greatest Hits Vol. 1	Released: 2 March 1989; Label: Polydor; Formats: CD, LP, MC	3	64	39	46	UK: Gold
Headstart for Happiness	Released: 1989; Label: Pickwick; Formats: CD, MC	—	—	—	—	
Here's Some That Got Away	Released: June 1993; Label: Polydor; Formats: CD, MC	39	—	43	—	
The Style Council Collection	Released: 19 February 1996; Label: Polydor; Formats: CD, MC	60	—	—	—	
Classic Style Council: The Universal Masters Collection	Released: December 1999; Label: Polydor; Formats: CD	—	—	—	—	
Greatest Hits	Released: 14 August 2000; Label: Polydor; Formats: CD, 2xLP	28	—	—	—	UK: Gold
The Collection	Released: 8 October 2001; Label: Spectrum Music; Formats: CD	—	—	—	—	UK: Gold
The Sound of the Style Council	Released: 18 March 2003; Label: Polydor; Formats: CD, 2xLP	—	—	—	—	
Long Hot Summers: The Story of the Style Council	Released: 4 September 2020; Label: Polydor; Formats: 2xCD, 3xLP, digital download	8	—	—	—	
"—" denotes releases that did not chart or were not released in that territory.

=== Box sets ===
Title	Album details	Peak chart positions
Title	Album details	UK
Keeps on Burning – The Style Council Singles	Released: 15 April 1987; Label: Polydor; Formats: 6x7"; Japan-only limited release	—
The Complete Adventures of the Style Council	Released: 12 October 1998; Label: Polydor; Formats: 5xCD	100
Keeps on Burning	Released: January 2007; Label: Polydor; Formats: 10xCD; Japan-only limited release	—
Classic Album Selection	Released: 15 July 2013; Label: Polydor; Formats: 6xCD, digital download	67
"—" denotes releases that did not chart or were not released in that territory.

=== Video albums ===
Title	Album details
What We Did on Our Holidays – The Video Singles	Released: November 1983; Label: PolyGram Music Video; Formats: VHS
Far East & Far Out – Council Meeting in Japan	Released: 16 August 1984; Label: PolyGram Music Video; Formats: VHS, LaserDisc, DVD
What We Did the Following Year – The Video Singles	Released: 2 December 1985; Label: PolyGram Music Video; Formats: VHS
Showbiz – The Style Council, Live!	Released: May 1986; Label: PolyGram Music Video; Formats: VHS, LaserDisc
Jerusalem	Released: February 1987; Label: Palace, PolyGram Music Video; Formats: VHS, LaserDisc
Confessions of a Pop Group	Released: October 1988; Label: PolyGram Music Video; Formats: CD-V, VHS
The Video Adventures of the Style Council – Greatest Hits Vol. 1	Released: 10 March 1989; Label: Channel 5, PolyGram Music Video; Formats: VHS, LaserDisc
Live at Full House	Released: 1989; Label: Meldac; Formats: LaserDisc; Japan-only release
The Style Council on Film	Released: 24 November 2003; Label: Universal Music; Formats: 2xDVD
The Universal Masters DVD Collection	Released: 11 April 2005; Label: Polydor; Formats: DVD; US-only release
Essential Videos	Released: 26 October 2007; Label: Universal Music Group; Formats: DVD

== Singles and in-sequence EPs ==
Title	Year	Peak chart positions										Certifications	Album
Title	Year	UK	AUS	BEL	CAN	IRE	NL	NZ	US	US AC	US Dance	Certifications	Album
"Speak Like a Child"	1983	4	29	—	—	5	—	—	—	—	—	UK: Silver	Non-album singles (UK) / Introducing The Style Council (US)
"Money Go Round"	1983	11	—	—	—	11	—	—	—	—	—		Non-album singles (UK) / Introducing The Style Council (US)
À Paris EP (lead tracks: "Long Hot Summer" and "The Paris Match")	1983	3	—	—	—	3	—	—	—	—	—	UK: Silver	Non-album singles (UK) / Introducing The Style Council (US)
"Long Hot Summer" (Regular single outside UK and Ireland)	1983	—	28	—	41	—	—	12	—	—	—		Non-album singles (UK) / Introducing The Style Council (US)
"A Solid Bond in Your Heart"	1983	11	—	—	—	14	—	—	—	—	—		Non-album singles (UK) / My Ever Changing Moods (US)
"My Ever Changing Moods"	1984	5	70	—	42	11	37	32	29	—	—		Café Bleu (UK) / My Ever Changing Moods (US)
Groovin' EP (lead tracks: "You're the Best Thing" and "The Big Boss Groove")	1984	5	—	—	—	5	—	—	—	—	—	UK: Silver	Café Bleu (UK) / My Ever Changing Moods (US)
"You're the Best Thing" (Regular single outside UK and Ireland)	1984	—	17	—	97	—	—	7	76	31	—		Café Bleu (UK) / My Ever Changing Moods (US)
"Shout to the Top!"	1984	7	8	14	—	10	36	6	—	—	—		Our Favourite Shop (UK) / Internationalists (US) (Note: Also appears on the Vision Quest soundtrack in the US)
"Soul Deep" (as the Council Collective)	1985	24	85	—	—	—	—	—	—	—	—		Non-album single
"Walls Come Tumbling Down!"	1985	6	19	36	—	6	—	15	—	—	—		Our Favourite Shop (UK) / Internationalists (US)
"Come to Milton Keynes"	1985	23	—	—	—	14	—	—	—	—	—		Our Favourite Shop (UK) / Internationalists (US)
"Boy Who Cried Wolf" (Not released in the UK)	1985	—	38	—	—	—	—	21	—	—	—		Our Favourite Shop (UK) / Internationalists (US)
"The Lodgers"	1985	13	—	—	—	9	—	47	—	—	—		Our Favourite Shop (UK) / Internationalists (US)
"(When You) Call Me" (Live) (Not released in the UK)	1985	—	91	—	—	—	—	—	—	—	—		Home and Abroad
"Have You Ever Had It Blue"	1986	14	—	—	—	8	28	33	—	—	—		Absolute Beginners soundtrack
"It Didn't Matter"	1987	9	48	22	—	4	90	48	—	—	—		The Cost of Loving
"The Cost of Loving" (Japan-only release)	1987	—	—	—	—	—	—	—	—	—	—		The Cost of Loving
"Waiting"	1987	52	—	—	—	—	—	—	—	—	—		The Cost of Loving
"Heavens Above" (US-only release)	1987	—	—	—	—	—	—	—	—	—	—		The Cost of Loving
"Wanted"	1987	20	98	—	—	18	—	—	—	—	—		Non-album single
"Life at a Top People's Health Farm"	1988	28	—	—	—	—	—	—	—	—	—		Confessions of a Pop Group
1234 EP (lead track: "How She Threw It All Away")	1988	41	—	—	—	—	—	—	—	—	—		Confessions of a Pop Group
"How She Threw It All Away" (Regular single outside UK and Ireland)	1988	—	—	—	—	—	—	—	—	—	—		Confessions of a Pop Group
"Like a Gun" (as King Truman)	1988	—	—	—	—	—	—	—	—	—	—		Non-album single
"Promised Land"	1989	27	106	—	—	22	—	—	—	—	19		The Singular Adventures of the Style Council
"Long Hot Summer '89" (remix)	1989	48	—	—	—	—	—	—	—	—	—		The Singular Adventures of the Style Council
"—" denotes releases that did not chart or were not released in that territory.

== Off-sequence EPs ==
Title	Album details	Peak chart positions
Title	Album details	UK
Café Bleu	Released: 12 December 1987; Label: Polydor; Formats: CD, 7"	—
The Bird's & the B's	Released: 12 December 1987; Label: Polydor; Formats: CD, 7"	—
Mick Talbot Is Agent 88	Released: 12 December 1987; Label: Polydor; Formats: CD, 7"	100
"—" denotes releases that did not chart or were not released in that territory.
