= Here's Some That Got Away =

Compilation album by The Style Council
- Released: December 1993; 22 February 1994 (US release)
- Recorded: 1983–1989
- Length: 71:46
- Label: Polydor
- Producer: Paul Weller, Peter Wilson, Mick Talbot

The Style Council chronology
The Singular Adventures of The Style Council (1989)	Here's Some That Got Away (1993)	The Complete Adventures of The Style Council (1998)

Here's Some That Got Away is the third compilation album by the Style Council, released in 1993. As the album cover stated, the album contained rarities such as demos and B-sides, many of them previously unreleased. It followed 1992's Extras, featuring rarities by Paul Weller's previous band The Jam. The album cover is a photograph showing all four members of the Style Council taken in 1987, an outtake from the photo session producing the US album cover to The Cost of Loving. Other photographs from the session were later used for The Singular Adventures of The Style Council and Greatest Hits. Here's Some That Got Away reached 39 in the UK Albums Chart.

Professional ratings
Review scores
Source	Rating
AllMusic	3/5 stars

== Track listing ==
1. "Love Pains" – 3:20 (Willie Clayton cover)
2. "Party Chambers" – 3:19 (B side of "Speak Like a Child")
3. "The Whole Point II" – 2:49 (B side of "Walls Come Tumbling Down!")
4. "The Ghosts Of Dachau" – 2:47 (B side of "Shout to the Top!")
5. "Sweet Loving Ways" – 3:31 (B side of "Life at a Top People's Health Farm")
6. "A Casual Affair" – 3:24
7. "A Woman's Song" – 2:31 (Demo version)
8. "Mick's Up" – 3:09 (B side of "Money-Go-Round")
9. "Waiting On A Connection" – 3:05
10. "Night After Night" – 2:58 (David Sea cover)
11. "The Piccadilly Trail" –3:44 (B side of "Shout to the Top!")
12. "(When You) Call Me" – 2:55 (Demo version)
13. "My Very Good Friend" – 3:38
14. "April's Fool" – 3:01
15. "In Love For The First Time" – 3:38 (B side of "How She Threw It All Away")
16. "Big Boss Groove" – 4:39 (B side of "You're the Best Thing")
17. "Mick's Company" – 2:48 (B side of "My Ever Changing Moods")
18. "Bloodsports" – 3:33 (B side of "Walls Come Tumbling Down!")
19. "Who Will Buy" – 2:42 (B side of "It Didn't Matter")
20. "I Ain't Goin' Under" – 3:17
21. "I Am Leaving" – 3:36
22. "A Stone's Throw Away" – 1:50 (Demo version)
