= Greatest Hits (The Style Council album) =

Greatest hits album by the Style Council
- Released: 14 August 2000; 14 April 2003 (re-release)
- Recorded: 1983–1989
- Length: 76:35
- Label: Polydor
- Producer: Paul Weller; Peter Wilson; Mick Talbot

The Style Council chronology
The Complete Adventures of The Style Council (1998)	Greatest Hits (2000)	The Collection (2001)

Greatest Hits is a compilation album by the English band the Style Council, released on 14 August 2000 eleven years after their split. It was re-released 14 April 2003.

It is the band's second greatest hits album, eleven years after The Singular Adventures of The Style Council. Greatest Hits differs from the latter being in chronological order, and with the addition of "Come to Milton Keynes" and "The Big Boss Groove".

Both albums feature a photograph of the band showing all four members which was taken in 1987. The US version of The Cost of Loving and the rarities compilation Here's Some That Got Away also feature photographs from this session.

Professional ratings
Review scores
Source	Rating
AllMusic	3.5/5 stars

== Track listing ==
All tracks written by Paul Weller, except where noted.

No.	Title	Writer(s)	Original album	Length
1.	"Speak Like a Child"		Introducing The Style Council	3:18
2.	"Money-Go-Round (Parts 1 & 2)" (original full 12" version)		Introducing The Style Council	7:40
3.	"Long Hot Summer" (single edit)		Introducing The Style Council	3:51
4.	"A Solid Bond in Your Heart"		Café Bleu (US release); non-album single in UK	3:18
5.	"My Ever Changing Moods" (single edit)		Café Bleu	4:04
6.	"You're the Best Thing" (12" version)		Café Bleu	5:42
7.	"The Big Boss Groove" (full version)		Non-album single	4:38
8.	"Shout to the Top!" (full version)		Our Favourite Shop	4:16
9.	"Walls Come Tumbling Down"		Our Favourite Shop	3:25
10.	"Come to Milton Keynes"		Our Favourite Shop	3:01
11.	"The Lodgers (or She Was Only a Shopkeeper's Daughter)" (extended single version; featuring Dee C. Lee)	Weller; Mick Talbot	Our Favourite Shop	4:56
12.	"Have You Ever Had it Blue" (single version)		Non-album single	3:24
13.	"It Didn't Matter" (album version)	Weller; Talbot	The Cost of Loving	5:45
14.	"Waiting"		The Cost of Loving	4:27
15.	"Wanted (Or Waiter, There's Some Soup in My Flies)"		Non-album single	3:24
16.	"Life at a Top Peoples Health Farm"		Confessions of a Pop Group	4:19
17.	"How She Threw it All Away"		Confessions of a Pop Group	4:14
18.	"Promised Land" (radio edit)	Joe Smooth	Non-album single	2:53

== Charts ==
Chart (2000)	Peak position
UK Albums (OCC)	28

== Certifications ==
Region	Certification	Certified units/sales
United Kingdom (BPI)	Gold	100,000^{*}
^{*} Sales figures based on certification alone.
