= Home and Abroad =

1986 live album by The Style Council

Live album by the Style Council
- Released: 5 May 1986
- Recorded: December 1985
- Genres: Pop; sophisti-pop; pop rock; synthpop
- Length: 50:20
- Label: Polydor
- Producer: Peter Wilson

The Style Council chronology
Our Favourite Shop (1985)	Home and Abroad (1986)	The Cost of Loving (1987)

Professional ratings
Review scores
Source	Rating
AllMusic	2/5 stars
The Rolling Stone Album Guide	2/5 stars
Sounds	4/5 stars

Home and Abroad (styled Live! The Style Council, Home & Abroad. on its cover) is a live album by the English band the Style Council, released on 5 May 1986. It was recorded on the tour supporting the band's 1985 album Our Favourite Shop.

It is their first non-studio album and their only live album until 1998's In Concert. As was common at the time, the CD and cassette versions of the album featured two songs that did not appear on the LP. The album cover shows both Paul Weller and Mick Talbot sitting on a stool, although both Dee C. Lee and Steve White appear on the album.

Reviewing the album, AllMusic's Stephen Thomas Erlewine wrote: "Home & Abroad is a slick and earnest live set, but it's only of interest to die-hard Paul Weller fans."

== Track listing ==
1. "The Big Boss Groove"
2. "My Ever Changing Moods"
3. "The Lodgers"
4. "Headstart for Happiness"
5. "(When You) Call Me"
6. "The Whole Point of No Return"
7. "Our Favourite Shop"
8. "With Everything to Lose"
9. "Homebreakers"
10. "Shout to the Top!"
11. "Walls Come Tumbling Down!"
12. "Internationalists"

Tracks 1 and 7 did not appear on the vinyl album.

== Personnel ==
=== The Style Council ===
- Paul Weller – lead vocals (1–6, 8, 10–12), backing vocals, guitar (2–6, 8–10, 12)
- Mick Talbot – keyboards (1, 4, 10), organ (2, 8, 9, 11), synthesizers (3, 5, 6), lead vocals (9), backing vocals
- Steve White – drums
- Dee C. Lee – vocals

==== Additional musicians ====
- Helen Turner – organ (1), synthesizers (5, 9, 10, 12), keyboards (7, 8, 11), backing vocals
- Camelle Hinds – bass (1–4, 6–12), synthesizers (5), backing vocals
- Steve Sidelnyk – percussion
- Billy Chapman – saxophone
- Mike Mower – saxophone, flute (8)
- Stewart Prosser – trumpet, flugelhorn
- Guy Barker – trumpet
- Chris Lawrence – trombone
- Robbie Glanfield – guitar (1, 7), synthesizers (11)
- Dave Nelson – synthesizers (7), percussion (7)

=== Technical ===
- Produced by Peter Wilson
- Photography – Nick Knight
- Design – Simon Halfon, Paul Weller, and Mick Talbot
- Make-up – Lynn Easton

== Charts ==
Chart (1986)	Peak position
Australian Albums (Kent Music Report)	59
Dutch Albums (Album Top 100)	27
German Albums (Offizielle Top 100)	53
Japanese Albums (Oricon)	34
New Zealand Albums (RMNZ)	21
Swedish Albums (Sverigetopplistan)	36
UK Albums (Official Charts)	8

== Certifications ==
Region	Certification	Certified units/sales
United Kingdom (BPI)	Silver	60,000^{^}
^{^} Shipments figures based on certification alone.
