= The Singular Adventures of The Style Council =

The Singular Adventures of The Style Council, Greatest Hits Vol.1

Greatest hits album by the Style Council
- Released: March 1989
- Recorded: 1983–1989
- Length: 69:26
- Label: Polydor
- Producer: Paul Weller; Peter Wilson; Mick Talbot

The Style Council chronology
Confessions of a Pop Group (1988)	The Singular Adventures of The Style Council, Greatest Hits Vol.1 (1989)	Here's Some That Got Away (1993)

The Singular Adventures of The Style Council is the first greatest hits album by the English pop band the Style Council, released in March 1989 by Polydor Records. Subtitled Greatest Hits Vol. 1, there was never a Vol. 2 as the group broke up within a year of the album's release.

The album cover is a photograph showing all four members taken in 1987, an outtake from the photo session producing the US album cover to The Cost of Loving. Other photographs from the session were later used for Here's Some That Got Away and Greatest Hits.

The new track, "Promised Land", was a preview of the house-influenced direction of the band's next studio album, Modernism: A New Decade, intended for release later in 1989, but which their record company, Polydor, refused to release. Modernism was not released until 1998. The Singular Adventures... was released in March 1989 to positive reviews and reached number 3 in the UK Album Chart.

Professional ratings
Review scores
Source	Rating
AllMusic	4.5/5 stars

== Track listing ==
1. "You're the Best Thing" (Alternate Mix) – 4:30 original from Café Bleu
2. "Have You Ever Had It Blue?" (12" version) – 3:23 Non-album single
3. "Money-Go-Round, Parts 1 & 2" (Alternate Mix) – 7:42 from Introducing The Style Council
4. "My Ever Changing Moods" (12" version) – 5:40 original version from Café Bleu
5. "Long Hot Summer" (12" version) '89 Mix – 6:56 from Introducing The Style Council
6. "The Lodgers" (Alternate Mix) – 3:39 from Our Favourite Shop
7. "Walls Come Tumbling Down!" – 3:24 from Our Favourite Shop
8. "Shout to the Top!" – 3:27 Non-album single
9. "Wanted" – 3:25 Non-album single
10. "It Didn't Matter (single edit)" – 4:51 original from The Cost of Loving
11. "Speak Like a Child" – 3:15 from Introducing The Style Council
12. "A Solid Bond in Your Heart" – 3:16 from My Ever Changing Moods
13. "Life at a Top Peoples Health Farm" – 4:26 from Confessions of a Pop Group
14. "Promised Land" – 2:48 New track
15. "How She Threw It All Away" – 4:17 from Confessions of a Pop Group
16. "Waiting" – 4:27 from The Cost of Loving

== Charts ==
Chart (1989)	Peak position
Australia (Kent Music Report)	64
