= Internationalists =

Internationalists may refer to:

- Internationalism (politics), a movement to increase cooperation across national borders
- Internationalism, a current within the socialist movement opposed to World War I
- Our Favourite Shop, second album by The Style Council, released in the USA as Internationalists
