= The Lodgers (song) =

Single by the Style Council

from the album Our Favourite Shop
- Released: 1985
- Length: 3:54
- Label: Polydor
- Songwriters: Paul Weller; Mick Talbot
- Producers: Paul Weller and Brian Robson

The Style Council singles chronology
"Come to Milton Keynes" (1985)	"The Lodgers" (1985)	"Boy Who Cried Wolf" (1985)

"The Lodgers" also known by the full title "The Lodgers (Or She Was Only a Shopkeeper's Daughter)" is a song by the English band the Style Council, which was their eleventh single to be released. It was composed by lead vocalist Paul Weller and keyboardist Mick Talbot, and was released in 1985. It is the third single from the band's second studio album, Our Favourite Shop (1985). Our Favourite Shop was renamed Internationalists in the United States.

== Compilation appearances ==
As well as the song's single release, it has featured on various compilation albums released by the Style Council. The song was included on The Singular Adventures of The Style Council, The Complete Adventures of The Style Council, and Greatest Hits.

== Track listing ==
- 12" Single (TSCX 10, 883 351 1)
1. "The Lodgers" (Extended Mix) - 4:56
2. "The Big Boss Groove" (Live) - 4:10
3. "Move on Up" (Live) - 2:35
4. "You're the Best Thing" (Live) - 4:58
5. Money-Go-Round-Medley (Live): "Money-Go-Round"/"Soul Deep"/"Strength of Your Nature" - 6:31
- 7" Singles (TSC 10)
1. "The Lodgers" - 3:34
2. "The Big Boss Groove - Live" - 4:10
3. "You're the Best Thing" - 4:58

== Charts ==
Chart (1985)	Peak position
New Zealand Singles Chart	47
UK Singles Chart	13
