= It Didn't Matter =

Single by the Style Council

from the album The Cost of Loving
- B-side: "All Year Round"; "It Didn't Matter (Instrumental)" (12" only)
- Released: 9 January 1987
- Studio: Solid Bond (London, UK)
- Genre: Electronic; jazz; rock; funk; soul; pop; pop rock; synthpop
- Label: Polydor
- Songwriters: Paul Weller; Mick Talbot
- Producer: Paul Weller

The Style Council singles chronology
"Have You Ever Had It Blue" (1986)	"It Didn't Matter" (1987)	"Waiting" (1987)

"It Didn't Matter" is a song by the English band the Style Council which was their fifteenth single to be released. It was composed by lead singer Paul Weller, keyboardist Mick Talbot, and was released in January 1987. The song was duetted by Weller and his then-wife Dee C. Lee. It is the first single from the band's third album, The Cost of Loving, also known as the Orange album. Backed with "All Year Round", it became a hit, peaking at No. 9 in the UK, and No. 48 in both Australia, and New Zealand. It has remained one of their most enduring hits.

== Compilation appearances ==
As well as the song's single release, it has featured on various compilation albums released by The Style Council. The song was included on The Singular Adventures of The Style Council, The Complete Adventures of The Style Council, and Greatest Hits.

== Track listing ==
- 12" Single (TSCX 12)
1. "It Didn't Matter" – 5:47
2. "It Didn't Matter (Instrumental)" – 5:47
3. "All Year Round" – 2:18
- 7" Single (885 492–7)
1. "It Didn't Matter" – 4:49
2. "All Year Round" – 2:17

== Personnel ==
Credits are adapted from the album's liner notes.

- Paul Weller – lead vocals, guitars
- Dee C. Lee – lead vocals, backing vocals
- Mick Talbot – keyboards
- Steve White – drums

== Charts ==
=== Weekly charts ===
Chart (1987)	Peak position
Australian Singles Chart	48
Irish Singles Chart	4
Italy Airplay (Music & Media)	17
New Zealand Singles Chart	48
UK Singles Chart	9
