= Shout to the Top! =

1984 single by the Style Council

Single by the Style Council

from the album Our Favourite Shop and Vision Quest Soundtrack
- B-side: "Ghosts of Dachau"
- Released: October 1984
- Recorded: August/September 1984
- Genre: British soul; new wave; R&B; sophisti-pop; orchestral pop
- Label: Polydor
- Songwriter: Paul Weller
- Producer: Paul Weller for Solid Bond Productions Ltd.

The Style Council singles chronology
""You're the Best Thing" / "The Big Boss Groove" (1984)	"Shout to the Top!" (1984)	"Walls Come Tumbling Down!" (1985)

Music video
- "Shout to the Top!" on YouTube

"Shout to the Top!" is a song by the English band the Style Council, written by lead vocalist Paul Weller and released as the group's seventh single in 1984. The song was featured on the soundtrack to the American film Vision Quest.

The song was included on the deluxe edition of Our Favourite Shop (1985), and later featured in the film Billy Elliot and its soundtrack. Its music video displays paintings depicting the 1984 miners' strike.

== Compilation appearances ==
As well as the song's single release, it has featured on various Style Council compilation albums. The song was included on The Singular Adventures of The Style Council, The Complete Adventures of The Style Council, and Greatest Hits.

== Track listings ==
=== 7" single ===
- A "Shout to the Top!" (edit) – 3:16
- B "Ghosts of Dachau" – 2:55

=== 12" single ===
- A1 "Shout to the Top!" – 4:16
- A2 "Shout to the Top!" (instrumental) – 4:12
- B1 "The Piccadilly Trail" – 3:46
- B2 "Ghosts of Dachau" – 2:51

== Personnel ==
- Paul Weller - Lead vocals and backing vocals, electric guitar
- Mick Talbot - Piano and backing vocals
- Steve White - Drums and tambourine
- Dee C. Lee - Backing vocals

Additional personnel

- Kevin Miller - Bass
- Alison Limerick - Backing vocals
- John Mealing - Strings arrangement

== Charts ==
=== Weekly charts ===
Chart (1984–1985)	Peak position
Australia (Kent Music Report)	8
Ireland (IRMA)	10
New Zealand Singles Chart	6
Paraguay	1
UK Singles Chart	7

=== Year-end charts ===
Chart (1985)	Position
Australia (Kent Music Report)	66

== Certifications ==
Region	Certification	Certified units/sales
United Kingdom (BPI)	Silver	200,000^{‡}
^{‡} Sales+streaming figures based on certification alone.

== Fire Island featuring Loleatta Holloway version ==
"Shout to the Top"

Single by Fire Island featuring Loleatta Holloway
- Released: 1998
- Label: JBO, V2
- Songwriter: Paul Weller
- Producers: Pete Heller, Terry Farley, Gary Wilkinson

In 1998, "Shout to the Top!" was covered by English electronic music duo Fire Island, featuring Loleatta Holloway. This version went to number one on the US dance chart, and also reached No. 23 on the UK Singles Chart. Remixes were made by Industry Standard, Club 69 and Frankie Knuckles.

== See also ==
- List of Billboard number-one dance singles of 1998
