= Speak Like a Child (song) =

Single by the Style Council

from the album Introducing The Style Council
- B-side: "Party Chambers"
- Released: 11 March 1983
- Genre: Pop
- Length: 3:20
- Label: Polydor
- Songwriter: Paul Weller
- Producers: Paul Weller; Peter Wilson

The Style Council singles chronology
"Speak Like a Child" (1983)	"Money Go Round (Part 1)" (1983)

"Speak Like a Child" is the debut single by the English pop band the Style Council, released on 11 March 1983 and was included on the mini-LP, Introducing The Style Council (1983). Backed with "Party Chambers", it became a hit, peaking at number 4 on the UK Singles Chart. Band members Paul Weller and Mick Talbot were already well-known from their previous bands, the Jam and the Merton Parkas, respectively. It has remained one of their most enduring hits.

The single also features Tracie Young, who had just signed to Weller's Respond Records label, on backing vocals.

== Compilation appearances ==
As well as the song's single release, it has featured on various Style Council compilation albums. The song was included on The Singular Adventures of The Style Council (1989), The Complete Adventures of The Style Council (1998), and Greatest Hits (2000).

== Track listing ==
- 7" single (TSC1, TSC 1, 810 873-7)
1. "Speak Like a Child" – 3:15
2. "Party Chambers" – 3:20

== Personnel ==
Credits are adapted from the album's liner notes.

Musicians

- Paul Weller – lead vocals, guitars
- Mick Talbot – keyboards
- Zeke Manyika – drums
- Tracie Young – backing vocals

== Charts ==
Chart (1983)	Peak position
Australian Singles Chart	29
Irish Singles Chart	5
UK Singles Chart	4
