= Long Hot Summer (The Style Council song) =

1983 single by The Style Council

Single by the Style Council

from the album Introducing The Style Council
- B-side: "Party Chambers"; "The Paris Match"; "Le Départ"
- Released: 8 August 1983
- Recorded: June 1983
- Studio: Le Studio Grande Armée, Paris, France
- Genre: Sophisti-pop; soul; R&B
- Length: 7:04
- Label: Polydor
- Songwriter: Paul Weller
- Producers: Paul Weller; Peter Wilson

The Style Council singles chronology
"Money Go Round (Part 1)" (1983)	"Long Hot Summer" (1983)	"A Solid Bond in Your Heart" (1983)

Music video
- "Long Hot Summer" on YouTube

"Long Hot Summer" is a song recorded by the English band the Style Council. It was composed by lead singer Paul Weller, recorded in the Grande Armée Studios in Paris, and released on 8 August 1983. In the UK "Long Hot Summer" was the lead track of an EP, released as the group's third single, titled À Paris, which also contained the song "The Paris Match" plus two keyboard instrumentals, "Party Chambers" and "Le Depart". In other territories a conventional single was released that had "Long Hot Summer" as the A-side. The song was also included on the 1983 mini-album Introducing The Style Council.

The promotional video for "Long Hot Summer" was filmed on the River Cam in Cambridge. The song reached number three in the UK singles chart; this, it transpired, made it the Style Council's biggest hit, and it remains a staple of Paul Weller's live concerts.

== Compilation appearances ==
The song appears on The Singular Adventures of The Style Council (1989), Greatest Hits (2000) and the box set The Complete Adventures of The Style Council (1998).

== Track listing ==
- 12-inch single: Long Hot Summer (TSCX3)
1. "Long Hot Summer" (Extended Version)
2. "Party Chambers"
3. "The Paris Match"
4. "Le Départ"
- 7-inch single: Long Hot Summer (815 276-7)
1. "Long Hot Summer"
2. "Le Départ"

à Paris EP cover

- 7-inch single: à Paris (TSC 3 / 815026-7)
1. "Long Hot Summer"
2. ”Party Chambers”
3. ”The Paris Match”
4. "Le Départ"

== Personnel ==
Credits are adapted from the album's liner notes.

- Paul Weller – lead vocals, guitars
- Mick Talbot – keyboards
- Steve White – drums

== Charts ==
Chart (1983)	Peak position
Australian Singles Chart	28
Canadian Hot 100	41
Irish Singles Chart	3
New Zealand Singles Chart	12
UK Singles Chart	3
