= Boogie Box High =

English pop project (1987–1989)

- Origin: London, England
- Genres: Pop; dance-pop
- Years active: 1987–1989
- Label: Hardback
- Past members: Andros Georgiou; George Michael; Mick Talbot; David Austin; Deon Estus; Nick Heyward

Boogie Box High was an English pop musical project headed by Andros Georgiou in the late 1980s that featured a range of collaborators, including George Michael, guitarist Nick Heyward (of Haircut One Hundred), keyboardist Mick Talbot (of the Style Council), guitarist–songwriter David Austin, bassist Deon Estus, and others.

== Overview ==
Boogie Box High's first single was a cover version of "Jive Talkin'", originally a top ten hit for the Bee Gees in 1975, featuring Michael on lead vocals. Released in June 1987, the cover reached number 7 on the UK Singles Chart.

Outrageous, Boogie Box High's only album, was released in 1989. It was released in the United States via SBK Records. The album included the previous two singles, "Jive Talkin'" and "Gave It All Away", as well as a new released titled "Nervous". The latter single failed to garner any chart success.

Michael's contributions to the album were two previously unreleased songs he had written for Wham!'s debut studio album Fantastic, "Golden Soul" and "Soul Boy". Once again, Michael was not credited for any of this.

== Discography ==
=== Albums ===
- Outrageous (1989)

=== Singles ===
List of singles, with selected chart positions, showing year released and album name
| Title | Year | Peak chart positions | | Album |
| Title | Year | UK | AUS | Album |
|---|---|---|---|---|
| "Jive Talkin'" | 1987 | 7 | 8 | Outrageous |
| "Gave It All Away" | 1987 | 88 | — | Outrageous |
| "Nervous" | 1989 | — | — | Outrageous |
"—" denotes a recording that did not chart or was not released in that territory.
