= Confessions of a Pop Group =

1988 studio album by the Style Council

Studio album by the Style Council
- Released: June 20, 1988
- Recorded: 1988
- Studio: Solid Bond Studios (London)
- Genres: Sophisti-pop; art pop; experimental
- Length: 57:25
- Label: Polydor
- Producers: Paul Weller; Mick Talbot

The Style Council chronology
The Cost of Loving (1987)	Confessions of a Pop Group (1988)	Modernism: A New Decade (1989)

Confessions of a Pop Group is the fourth full-length studio album by the English sophisti-pop band the Style Council, released by Polydor on 20 June 1988. Following the critical failure of The Cost of Loving, tensions between the label and lead singer Paul Weller intensified, although Polydor provided Weller with a substantial advance to record the album. During recording sessions, backing vocalist Dee C. Lee became an official member of the group, while drummer Steve White departed. The sessions were engineered by Jeremy "Jezar" Wakefield using two 24-track digital recorders, enabling the band to explore recording techniques and musical approaches that had not previously been available to them.

Confessions is split into two distinct sections. The first (The Piano Paintings) consists of compositions influenced by jazz and classical music, while the second (which shares the album's title) features a more conventional and upbeat funk sound. This contrast between styles is reminiscent of the approach taken on the band's debut album, Café Bleu. The use of musical suites has led some to regard Confessions as a concept album. Weller drew inspiration from a range of artists, including composer Erik Satie and the Beach Boys. His socially conscious lyrics are notably more bitter and vitriolic than those on the band's earlier work. Each track is accompanied by a painting by Dan Davies in the album's liner notes.

Without any hit singles and an unconventional promotional campaign, Confessions achieved limited commercial success, reaching number 15 on the UK Albums Chart. It received mixed reviews, with some praising its musical ambitions while others regarded them as self-indulgent. The album received critical reassessment in the years following its release, with some critics regarding it as the Style Council's finest work and as a reflection of the cultural mood of late 1980s Britain. Weller has continued to express a favourable view of the album, which has been reissued several times. The tracks "How She Threw It All Away" and "Why I Went Missing" are frequently described as overlooked Weller classics, having remained absent from live performances since the early years of his solo career (1990–91). Another prominent track, "It's a Very Deep Sea", was performed by the reunited Style Council at the conclusion of a 2019 documentary about the band.

== Background ==
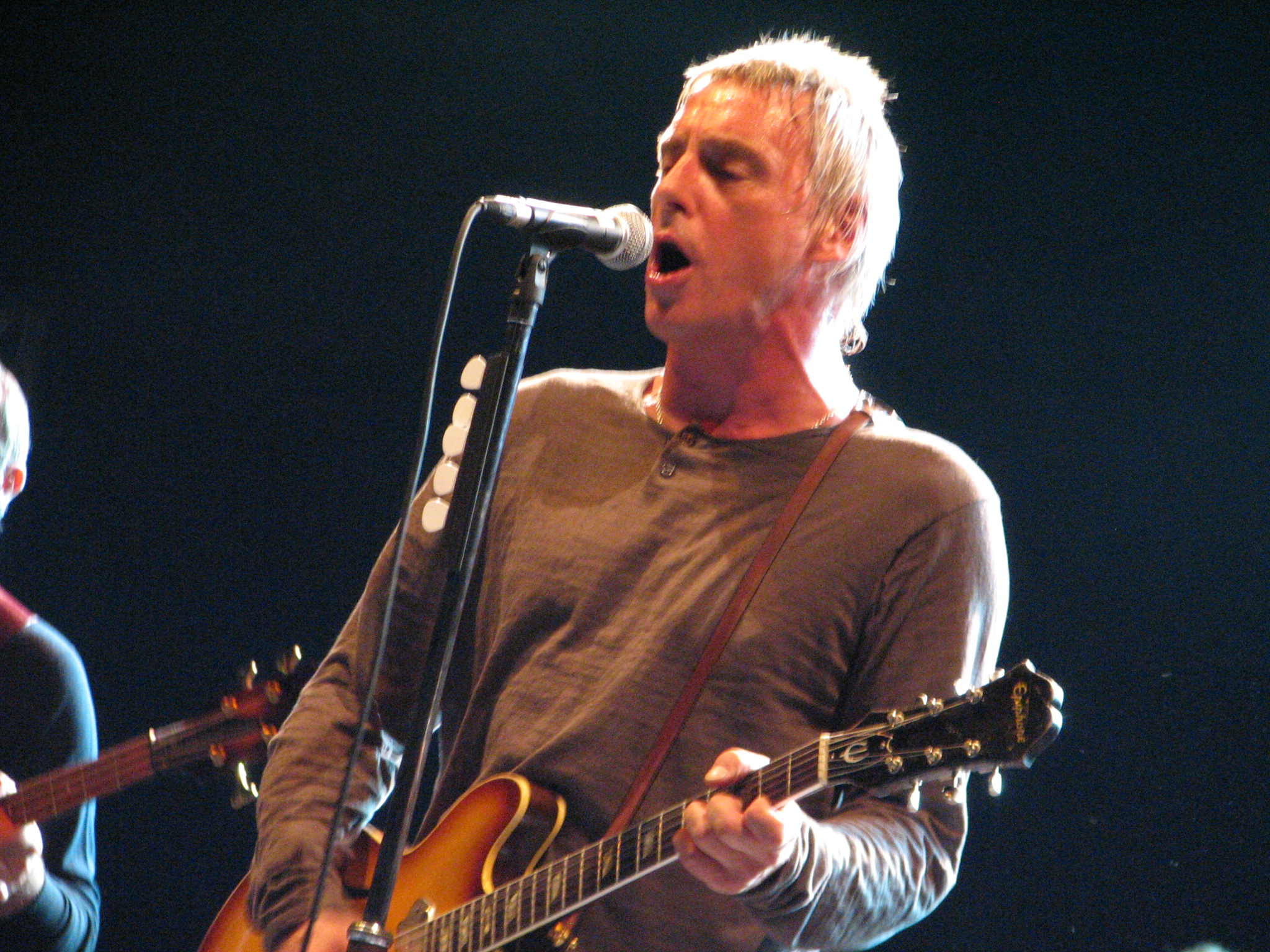
Confessions of a Pop Group was considered Paul Weller's most ambitious work to date.

After achieving critical and commercial success in 1985 and 1986, the Style Council's third full-length album, The Cost of Loving, was released in February 1987 to commercial success, reaching number 2 in the UK Albums Chart, but to hostile reviews from music critics. The album, which featured soul music and American-style R&B inspired by Jimmy Jam and Terry Lewis, was dismissed by one later critic as "bland," and several years later, the NME included the album in a list of fourteen albums that "should've been an EP". Later on in 1987, Red Wedge, a collective of musicians, including Style Council lead singer and writer Paul Weller, who had gathered to help spread support for the Labour Party among young voters, failed to displace the Conservative Party in the 1987 general election, and the collective soon disbanded.

The band's popularity was fading and the group were regularly being ridiculed in the music press, with criticism being aimed at Weller in particular. Tension between Weller and the band's record label Polydor was also prevalent, with the label becoming impatient with Weller's esoteric choices regarding musical direction and artwork. Weller was becoming more musically ambitious, and in early 1988 he and fellow band member Mick Talbot composed the songs for the band's fourth album, Confessions of a Pop Group, their most musically challenging project to date. The band set for recording the album with Polydor paying Weller a reluctant advance of £500,000. Tension between Weller and Polydor was especially prominent during the album's recording sessions.

Long time guest vocalist Dee C. Lee, who was pregnant with Weller's child and would soon become his wife, became an official member prior to the recording of the album, whereas drummer Steve White left the band to pursue a career with saxophonist Alan Barnes as the Jazz Renegades, who performed hard bop and Afro-Latin music. This left the Style Council to become a trio of Weller, Talbot and Lee. However, White still plays the drums on four songs on the album.

== Recording ==
Weller and Talbot chose to produce Confessions of a Pop Group alone so they could avoid arguments with outside producers, which had been an occurrence in previous recording sessions for the group. Weller elaborated, saying that self-producing Confessions was always their intention: "We don't like to repeat ourselves, we believe that progression is the most important thing." Jezar engineered the album and later described the sessions as "deeply satisfying on an emotional level." After his experiences working on The Cost of Loving, Weller was more confident with Confessions and told Jezar about things he wanted to try out for the first time, including classical concert harp on the song "The Gardener of Eden" and a capella vocals reminiscent of a barber shop quartet on "The Story of Someone's Shoe". Jezar later cited Confessions as raising the bar "of what we tried to achieve."

Jezar created a digital multitrack recorder setup using 48 tracks set across two separate 24-track Sony 3324 machines, giving him and the band the technical capability to try several things in the sessions they had not before. Using two 24-track machines rather than one 48-track machine allowed the band to use more production techniques on the album, including, in Jezar's recollection, "making perfect backup copies of projects, no cross-talk limitations (no need to plan what was recorded adjacent to a timecode track), being able to copy tracks further forward or further backwards in time (to change the musical 'feel'), back-up of multiple tracks (i.e. vocals) after you'd bounced or composited them down to free-up space, spinning-in (copy and paste) of one-off riffs and musical sections into other parts of a song, non destructive editing of multitracks [and] immensely complex, overlapping multitrack edits." He later said:

Although these features are now things that modern hard-disk recording includes as standard, being able to do these things for the first time in history was a thrilling experience. For example, in the song "Confessions 1, 2 & 3" there's a horn solo that originally just felt late rather than just lazy. Using digital editing techniques I was able to time-slide individual notes around until I got just the feel I was after. I was able to go through all of the tracks on all of the songs and erase small annoyances that previously I didn't have the precision to do - such as electrical pops in the middle of notes, or the squeaking of the piano stool. I rarely erase gasps of breath during vocals though - as I prefer just to automate a brief, minor volume reduction for a more natural result.

The group overcame the issue of deciding what a "normal" recording level for the machine's digital tape was by setting the machines' levels so that they and the SSL mixing desk had the same amount of headroom. The original version of "Mourning the Pass of Time" (the final part of "The Gardener of Eden" suite) was part of a demo with a 'feel' the band did not want to repeat, but the demo's musical structure faltered at the end, and using digital editing, Jezar rescued the part of the demo, re-arranged the order of the pieces, and blended it seamlessly into another version of it recorded several weeks later with a different setup, which Jezar cites as the biggest triumph of using digital recording, seeing as it may have been impossible to achieve this using analogue recording.

The drum machine-based second half of the album gave Jezar the opportunity to have fun with sequencing and programming. Weller was displeased with Jezar's initial mix of the album, feeling he copied too much from "modern productions from the charts," so Weller monitored the following mixes. "Initially, I thought his approach a little too conservative," Jezar recalled, "but in hindsight I'm glad of the way it worked out because the line I was going down would have made the result sound extremely dated - whereas I think the final result still stands up to scrutiny today."

== Music ==
"Side one is for the pensioners and side two's for the kids. I'm now writing for people my age and with my outlook. There's definitely a sense of humour there, but I don't suppose we'll get any credit for it."

— Paul Weller

Confessions of a Pop Group is split into two distinct sides with their own individual names, namely The Piano Paintings (side one) and Confessions of a Pop Group (side two). (Note: The American edition swapped the sides around, so that Confessions of a Pop Group was side one and The Piano Paintings was side two.) The Piano Paintings side features quieter pieces influenced by jazz and classical music, while the more upbeat Confessions side is closer to funk-style pop music. Writer John Reed notes that the album's split motif, complete with the usage of subtitles, hints that the album could be a concept album, a sentiment shared by another writer who felt the album is "edged towards concept album status" by featuring two ten minute epics. A promotional text for the album described it as "somewhat conceptual." By far the band's longest album with a length of almost 57 and a half minutes, it is advised consumers playing the LP version increase the volume of side two as it runs for over thirty minutes.

Writer Paolo Hewitt described the album as a highly experimental release, while another critic found it to be the group's most experimental album. James Masterton wrote it was the band's most diverse album, presenting an "at times random blend" of progressive rock, avant-garde and synthpop music. Describing the album's sound overall, journalist Michael Booth called the album a "cool pop/jazz/classical mix, lightened by flutes, harps and orchestral arrangements," while Dave Goodwin felt the album had a jazz feel overall, particularly on "The Gardener of Eden." Paul Lester, meanwhile, felt the usage of piano, synths and strings presented a "European melancholy." Smash Hits magazine described the album as combining "dious, mannered 'soul' style music" with tongue-in-cheek indulgent parts and "the odd classic song."

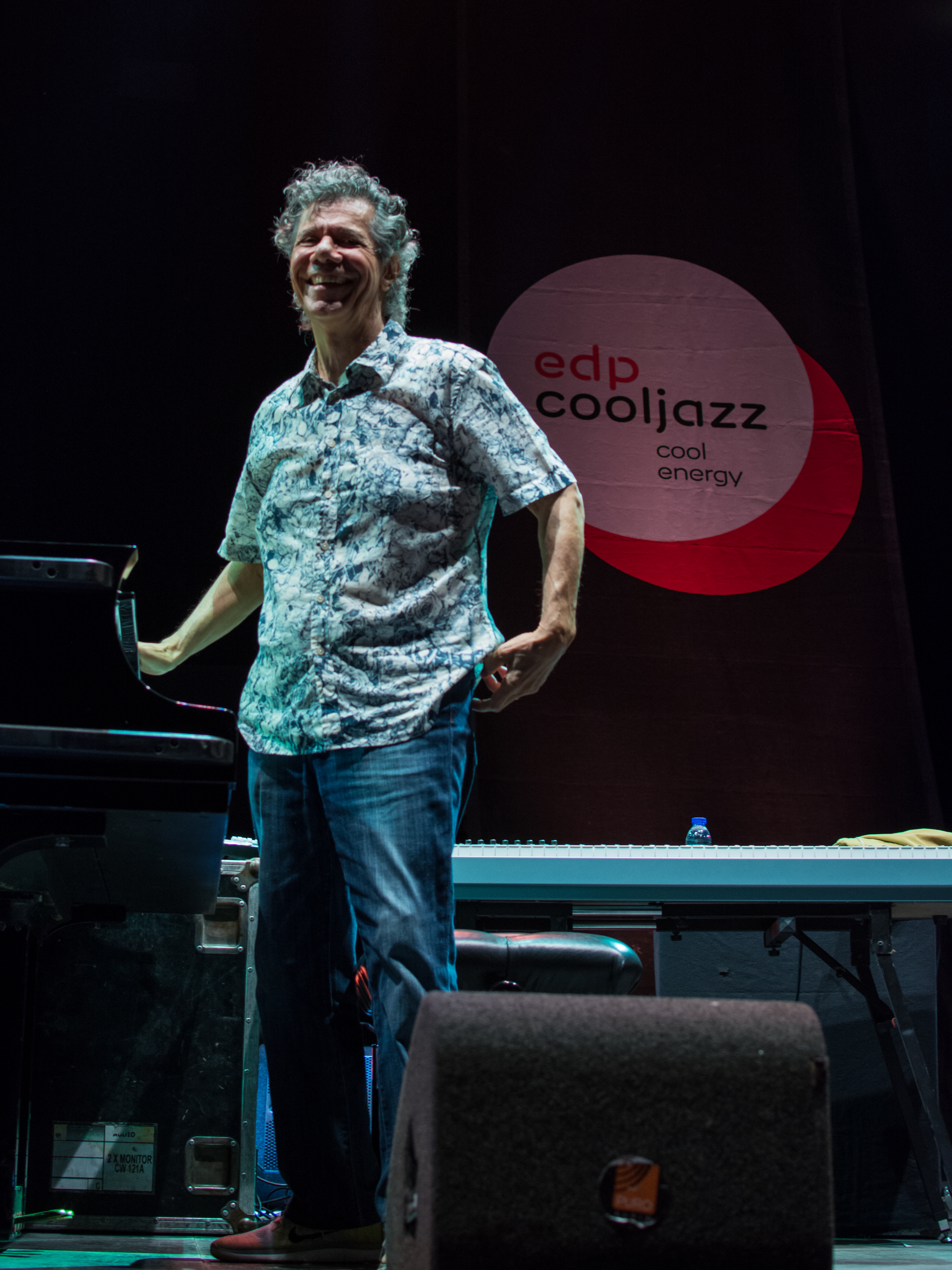
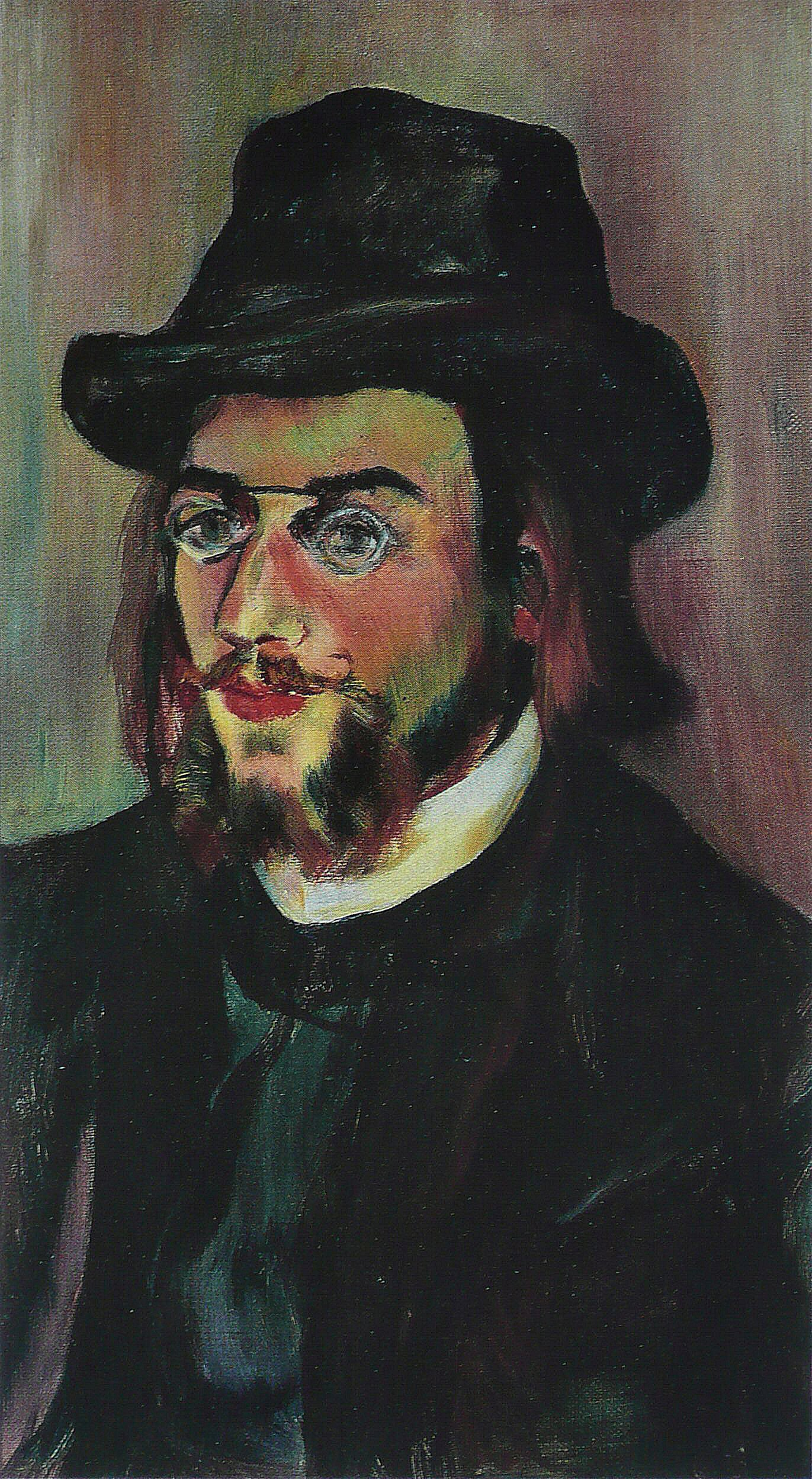
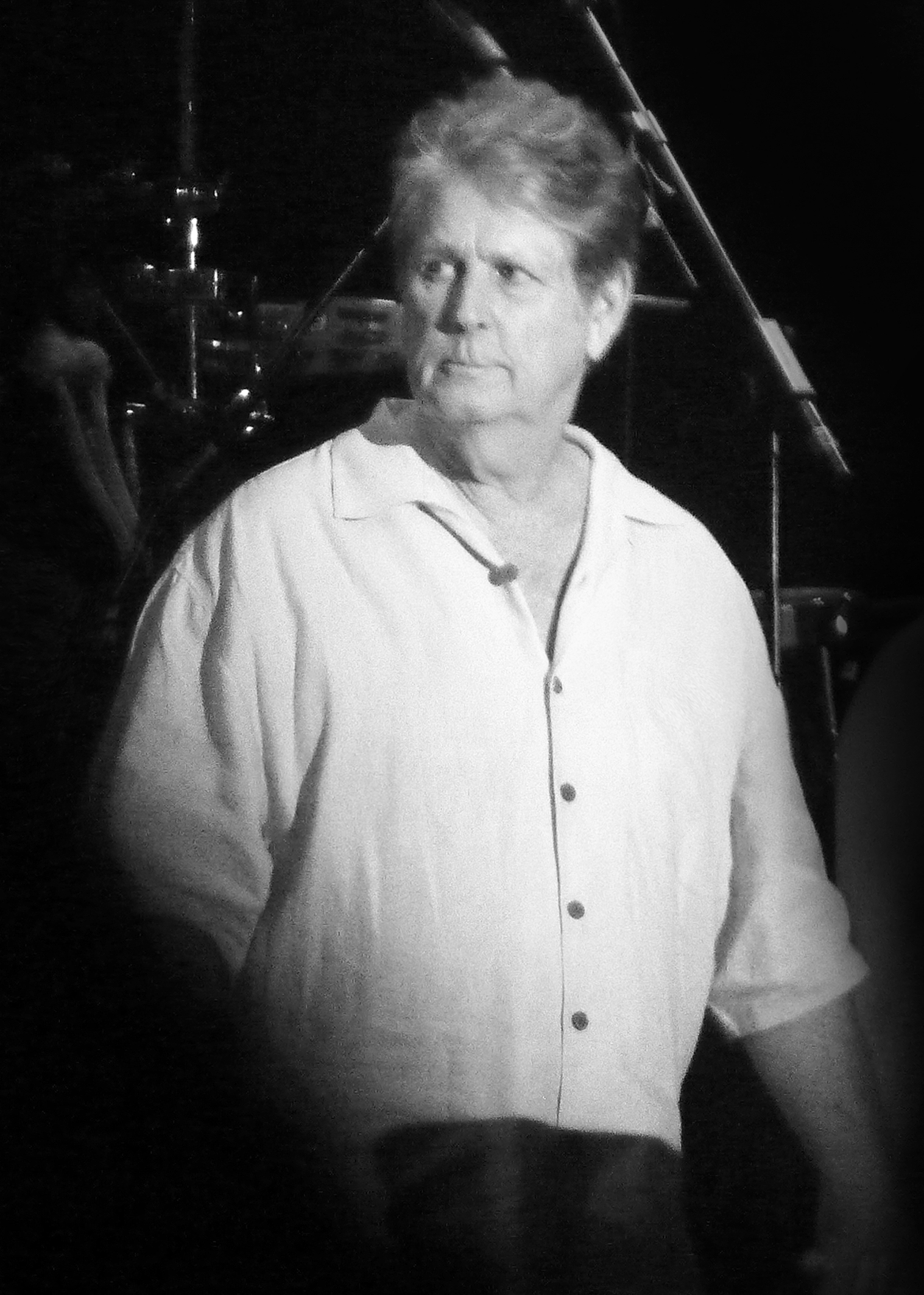
Influences on Confessions include Chick Corea, Erik Satie and Brian Wilson.

Composer Erik Satie was an influence on the album, particularly the atmosphere of his compositions. Weller regularly played Satie and Claude Debussy around this time, among other composers. The Beach Boys were also an influence on the album, as was Chick Corea. The band's bassist Camelle Hinds recalls Weller "absorbing composers like Bacharach and Michel Legrand. Dance was on the horizon and Confessions seemed like a semi-conclusion." Reed wrote that, like The Cost of Loving, Confessions "betrayed a debt to contemporary US R&B (from the work of million-selling producers Jimmy Jam and Terry Lewis to indie funk like Osiris' 'War on the Bullshit'). But the range of music on offer here, the sense of adventure, set it apart."

While Weller's lyrics on Confessions are socially conscious, as they had been on previous albums, his lyrics on Confessions in particular are considered some of Weller's most vitriolic and vindictive lyrics. Trouser Press felt the album contained Weller's "most dispirited lyrics," feeling his "general disgust at everything in sight is vitriolic and undisguised." The idealism of previous Style Councils was replaced by a pessimism and personal regrets regarding fractured relationships, one-night stands and guilt. Weller recalled of the album's melancholic tone: "It was just a mood. Not the result of any particular event. I'm always trying to write a good song, and if it's just about one experience, that's just fuckin' boring."

=== Side one (The Piano Paintings) ===
The Piano Paintings is the more atypical side of the album, featuring pieces influenced by classical music and ballads influenced by jazz. Uncut felt this side of the album "features sublime instrumental passages worthy of Satie, Bacharach or French soundtrack composer Francis Lai." The Trouser Press Music Guide called this section a "collection of jazzy songs with fancy vocal arrangements," while Stephen Thomas Erlewine of AllMusic made note of the "jazz-pop fusions" that feature on this side.

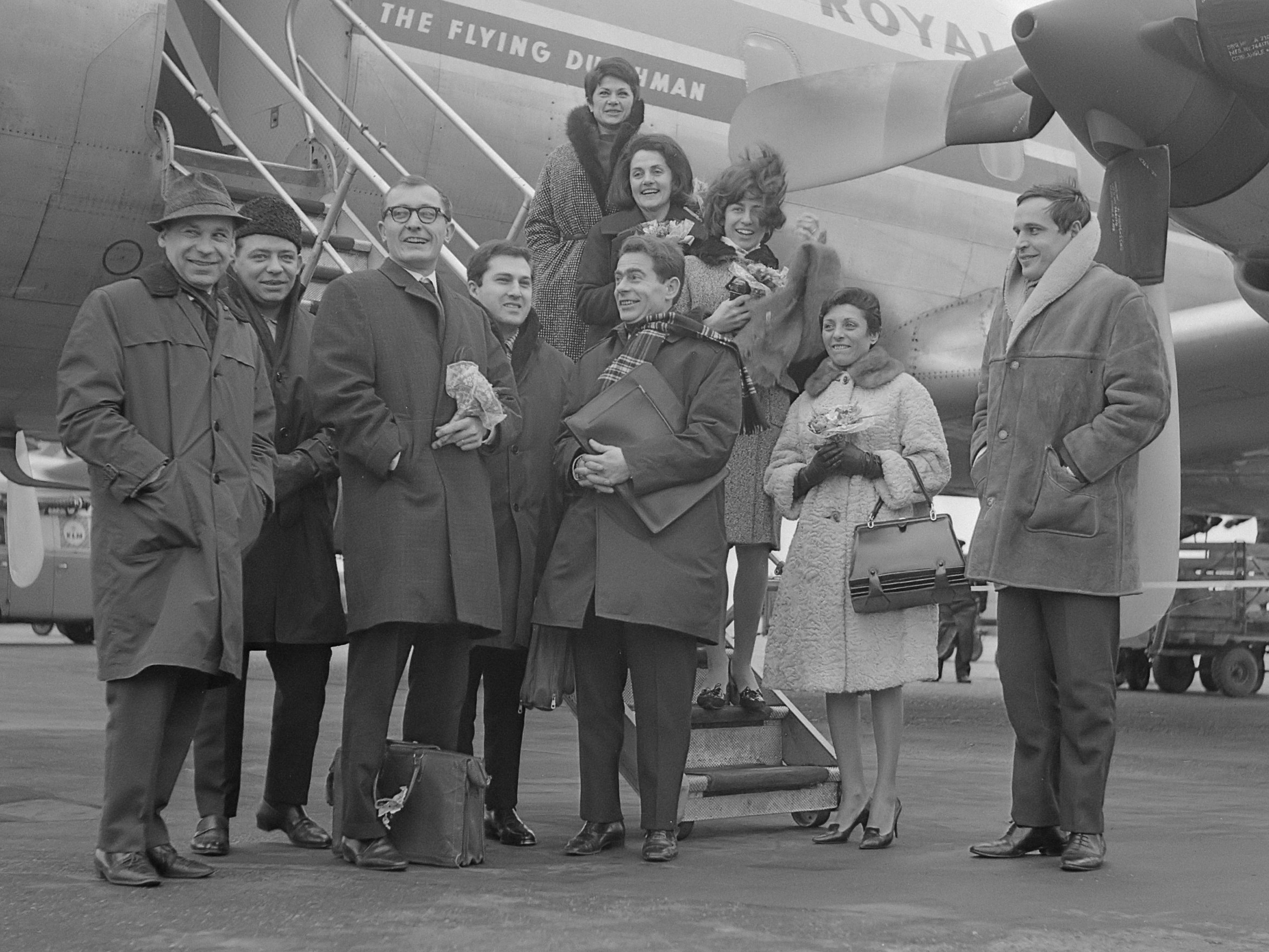
The Swingle Singers (pictured in 1964) perform backing vocals on "The Story of Someone's Shoe".

The desolate "It's a Very Deep Sea" opens the album, described as "haunting" by one critic. Weller cited sitting down at a piano "and hearing that first chord, and just what it inspires" as what inspired him to write the song: "It sounds like you're just sinking into the depths." Reed described the song as a poignant lullaby that recalls the Beach Boys' unfinished Smile album. Indeed, Weller saw the song as a "modern surf song Brian Wilson would be proud of, although he would have done it differently."

"The Story of Someone's Shoe", characterized by self-questioning lyrics that refer to one night stands, features backing harmonies from The Swingle Singers. Weller was a big fan of Place Vendôme, an album that the Swingle Singers recorded with the Modern Jazz Quartet in 1966 which uniquely blended the Singers' stylish vocal harmonies with the MJQ's abstract jazz devices, and it inspired Weller to ask the Swingle Singers to contribute to the Style Council song. The song's "emotionally explicit lyric" is, in the words of Dylan Jones, "unnervingly at odds with the lush arrangement, much in the vein of Elvis Costello." He felt the song successfully emphasized "Weller's immersion in quasi-classical music."

Weller wrote "Changing of the Guard" a paean to his former long-term girlfriend. Meanwhile, "The Little Boy in a Castle (A)/A Dove Flew Down From the Elephant (B)" is an instrumental written by Talbot, who likened the piece to "a snippet of a film soundtrack," although the song has also been described as "almost a pure classical piece" that is highly unlike the instrumentals on previous Style Council albums.

"The Gardener of Eden" is a three-piece suite consisting of the individual parts "In the Beginning", "The Gardener of Eden" and "Mourning the Passing of Time." Reed described the piece as "a cinematic mix of moody, quasi-classical piano interludes", reminiscent of Michael Nyman, "between intelligent lyrics which cast a weary eye over the world's ecological ravages." The song's intro features a harp and string quartet, and its coda features a doo-wop chorus intended as a tribute to the Beach Boys. Weller and Talbot disagreed as to the song's genre, with Weller feeling the song's harp and strings "definitely comes under" classical music, and while Talbot agreed there are classical elements to the song, he likened it more to film soundtracks; "the piano piece is a bit filmic." It has been described as an "avant-garde mix of classical and jazz stylings."

=== Side two (Confessions of a Pop Group) ===
The more upbeat Confessions side of the album features, in the words of Uncut magazine, "consummate white funk." Trouser Press described this side of the album as its "brassy soul-funk-pop portion." As the more commercial side of the album, both of the record's singles were picked from this side.

The anti-Margaret Thatcher song "Life at a Top People's Health Farm", featuring "murky horns and crass drums", was described by Weller as an update of "Subterranean Homesick Blues" by Bob Dylan, as has been described as an "oddity" with a "wild direction." The song contained "clicking" house beats atop a lush soul production which was described by Masterton as "like a record out of its time," and the vocals are drowned by the horns and drums. The lyrics name-check the diverse combination of Thatcher, Leon Trotsky and The Archers. Cited as an example of the bitter mood of the song and the entire album, the track begins with the sound of a toilet flushing.

The lyrics of "Why I Went Missing", a sunny song, was described by Spin as an example of Weller and Talbot appearing to enjoy "these made-it-through-the-rain glances backward," finding the song to be "full of this sort of self-analyzing, finding light in darkness, getting 'lost to find myself.'" It is followed on the album by the jaunty "How She Threw It All Away", which features flute performed by Dick Morrissey, and "Iwasadoledadstoyboy". "Confessions 1, 2 & 3" features trombone work from Chris Lawrence and a crowd applause that was described by Lester as "especially poignant, considering the speed with which the Council's fans were deserting them."

The album finishes with the title track, "Confessions of a Pop Group", a nine-minute funk track which, according to Reed, "reinvented" One Nation Under a Groove by Funkadelic, but instead replacing that album's optimism with a cynical, vindictive outlook of modern England in the aftermath of the Conservative Party's victory at the 1987 general election, with one commentator highlighting the lyrics "Cheap and tacky bullshit land/Told when to sit don't know where you stand/Too busy recreating the past/To live in the future." Reed referred to the song as a "grown-up" version of the Style Council's 1983 single "Money-Go-Round," while Trouser Press noted a stylistic similarity between the track and Tears for Fears' The Seeds of Love, released the following year.

== Artwork ==
Weller did not want a photograph of the band on the album cover, whereas Polydor did, but Weller relented as he was granted a similar wish for the maligned album cover of The Cost of Loving, and Polydor did not want a repeat of the obscurity of that album's sleeve. Thus, Weller's proposed sleeve was discarded and replaced it with a cover showing a photograph of the trio photographed by Lawrence Watson. On the image, Lee is tactically hidden by a grand piano to hide her pregnancy.

In keeping with the album's classical-inspired bent, each song on the album is accompanied in the liner notes by a specially commissioned painting by Dan Davies, which were put on display at the album's launch party at Hamilton's Gallery. Davies' illustrations visually describe the songs on the album, and were described by Dennis Munday as "quite striking." Talbot later claimed that Davies benefited particularly well financially from the paintings; Munn speculated that Davies' paintings potentially earned more money than the album.

== Release ==
"I would have paid good money to see the faces of the execs at Polydor when they first heard this cod classical music. After the failure of The Cost of Loving, they needed Paul to deliver a commercial album full of pop hits, and on hearing this they must have reached for the valium."

— Dennis Munday on "The Gardener of Eden Suite"

With the album completed, Weller voiced concerns on how Polydor would react to it, fearing they could reject the album. Cover magazine reported that Weller banked a £500,000 advance from the label to deliver Confessions, and when Weller eventually delivered the album to them, it was on a C90 audio cassette with a defiled mugshot of the label's A&R chief, which added to the tension between Weller and Polydor. Weller told the magazine Just 17 that Polydor were "bewildered" by the album, adding "this is going to be difficult, this is going to be trouble."

A press release appeared on 19 May 1988 entitled Life with the Lions, listing 15 bullet points, largely focusing on the release of lead single "Life at a Top People's Health Farm", released on the 20th, but also announcing a 33-minute concert film VHS release. That same day, the band performed the lead single on Channel 4 music interview/music show Wired (a short-lived replacement for The Tube) where the interviewer described it as one of the band's angriest songs. Confessions of a Pop Group was released by Polydor on 24 June 1988, coinciding with the publication of an official music book of the album. "How She Threw it All Away" was released on 15 July 1988 as the album's second and final single, despite the band's contract stating three singles had to be released per year.

The promotional angle for the album, described by Reed as "baffling," included a low-key release party in the form of a "cheese and wine bash" at Hamilton's Gallery, a high-brow art gallery in London. Polydor promoted the album with numerous unusual items, including the Confessions briefcase which contained a four-song sampler CD, four-song sampler cassette, 13-and-a-half minute selection VHS, an orange towel bearing the name of the band and album, and a black box to hold the cassette and VHS. As many reviews of the band's albums in the British music press were beginning to focus more on Weller than even mentioning the music directly, Polydor issued a promotional interview LP, including an interview by Yugoslavian writer Saša Stojanović, for journalists to pluck information from, although in Munn's recollection, the music press ignored the release, although Record Collector would later name it the band's second most valuable item.

== Reception ==
Professional ratings
Review scores
Source	Rating
AllMusic	2/5 stars
Smash Hits	6.5/10
Martin C. Strong	3/10

=== Contemporary reception ===
Confessions of a Pop Group peaked at number 15 on the UK Albums Chart, and stayed on the chart for three weeks, a dramatic fall in popularity for the band, whose previous albums had all reached either number one or two. The singles were also somewhat unsuccessful; "Life at a Top People's Health Farm" was issued as the first single, reaching number 28 in the UK Singles Chart, while "How She Threw it All Away", issued in some regions as 1234 E.P., was less of a success, reaching only number 41. On the US Billboard 200, the album reached number 174 and stayed on the chart for six weeks.

Upon release, the album attracted mixed reviews from critics, with some praising its ambitions and others deriding them as self-indulgent. An infamous review from Allan Jones of Melody Maker did not discuss the album directly, instead deriding Weller as "the slow kid in the class," prompting angry fans to write in. Chris Mugan of The Independent felt the band "disappeared up its own fundament on a couple of jazzy 'suites'," whereas a favourable review from Record Mirror read: "It really is an exceptional piece of pop music for the times we inhabit. Leave your prejudices at the door and step into the confessional. You'll feel better for it."

Sue Shaw of The New Internationalist reviewed it alongside Billy Bragg's Help Save the Youth of America mini-album, feeling the Style Council's album "manages to sound convincing only when it uses more established Weller styles," citing "Why I Went Missing" and "How She Threw It All Away." "We should always think twice before attacking an artist's attempts to escape from a musical straitjacket," she wrote, "but the dull funk-by-numbers too evident here should have been the first style discarded." American reception was more positive. Staci Bonner of Spin wrote that "a Style Council album is like a quick diagnosis of society, chastising those who abandon their idealism, but always ending on a positive note. However arduous the struggle against the corrupt bourgeoise, the Council persevere in their perpetual optimism. If the confession of this pop group is compromising rebellion with romance, it works." Bonner also felt that Lee's voice "combines with orgasmically beautiful piano solos to create pure bliss."

=== Retrospective assessment ===
"Widely ridiculed at the time, Confessions is, in retrospect, a curate's egg that’s well worthy of reappraisal."

— John Lewis of Uncut, 2008

Dismissive later reviews include AllMusic's Stephen Thomas Erlewine panning the album as "flat-out bad" with "pretentious and mean-spirited lyrics" accompanying music "which ranges from self-important jazz-pop fusions to an orchestral suite that finishes the album." Martin C. Strong, in The Great Rock Discography, felt the album was "lacking in focus, its string arrangements and classical pretensions seeing The Style Council sinking in a mire of self-indulgence." Dave Schulps and Ira Robbin of Trouser Press, however, wrote that the album was "a presentable outing." Michael Booth, writing in The Rough Guide to Rock, was generally dismissive but singled out two highlights; "Changing the Guard", which he felt was worthy of Frank Sinatra, and "How She Threw it All Away", which he felt returned the group to the sound of their early days.

Paul Lester wrote very favourably of the album in Uncut, describing it as the magazine's favourite Style Council album and saying it provides "the most credible, and most compelling, depiction of 'the real Paul Weller' : the sentimental, wistful romantic luxuriating in European melancholy (strings, piano, synths); the suburban soulboy in love with modern America." Journalist John Reed felt the album "might just be the most misunderstood album in recent pop history," feeling the album "towers over even solo pinnacles like Stanley Road". Reed compared the album to Dexys Midnight Runners' Don't Stand Me Down (1985), similarly "a potent mix of musical ambition and soul-searching" released to mixed reception. Gary Crowley wrote that he liked the album a lot: "This is an album I go back and listen to every now and then." In 2008, John Lewis wrote in Uncut that the album was "well worthy of reappraisal." In the book The Eighties: One Day, One Decade, journalist Dylan Jones described Confessions of a Pop Group as the pinnacle of the band's career, and that Weller's only problem "was convincing other people that this was the case."

=== Cultural responses ===
Several writers have placed Confessions of a Pop Group within different contexts, both socially and within Weller's career. Writer Paolo Hewitt wrote that the album was Weller's attempt to obtain complete musical freedom, "not answering to anyone," describing it as "the strangest record Weller ever involved himself in." Liberal politics magazine the New Statesman found the album to provide proof that left-leaning bands in Britain have "at last grasped the nettle" and begun using a subversive "counter-language." Reflecting on the album, John Reed felt the album coincided with the passing of political idealism within pop music, and captured the period perfectly, writing: "As the country entered a major recession, and a year on from the failed Red Wedge initiative, Weller painted a vivid picture of a bleak, hopeless world, his previous idealism replaced by pessimism and personal regrets of hollow one-night stands, of fraught relationships and feelings of guilt and shame. Coinciding with the death of political idealism in pop, this was arguably Weller at his most honest and, yes, soulful.

== Aftermath ==
Upon release, Confessions became the worst-selling album of Weller's career. Writer James Masterton cited the album as "essentially the moment that the group's commercial fortunes plunged off a cliff." Lewis wrote in Uncut that because the album made little effort to satisfy Weller loyalists, who were "horrified by the use of the Swingle Singers and the pastiches of Chick Corea, the Beach Boys and Erik Satie," they gave their copies to charity shops. Weller considered Confessions the best album he had ever made, and the reception made him realize how far removed he had become from his audience. Weller reflected on the album in 1998, rating the album four stars out of five and saying "Whatever I'd have written or done at the time would have been out of touch. But I still stand by it. I put a lot of time into it, and there was a better vibe than on The Cost of Loving. Lyrically, it was really good." When asked by Paul Lester whether the album's critical and commercial response upset him, Weller replied:

"I must have been. I put a lot of time into it, and there was a better vibe when we recorded it than The Cost of Loving, which was a real rough time for us. It wasn't particularly inspiring and I felt we'd got back on track. I thought, lyrically, the songs were really good. Again, some of the performances were lacking."

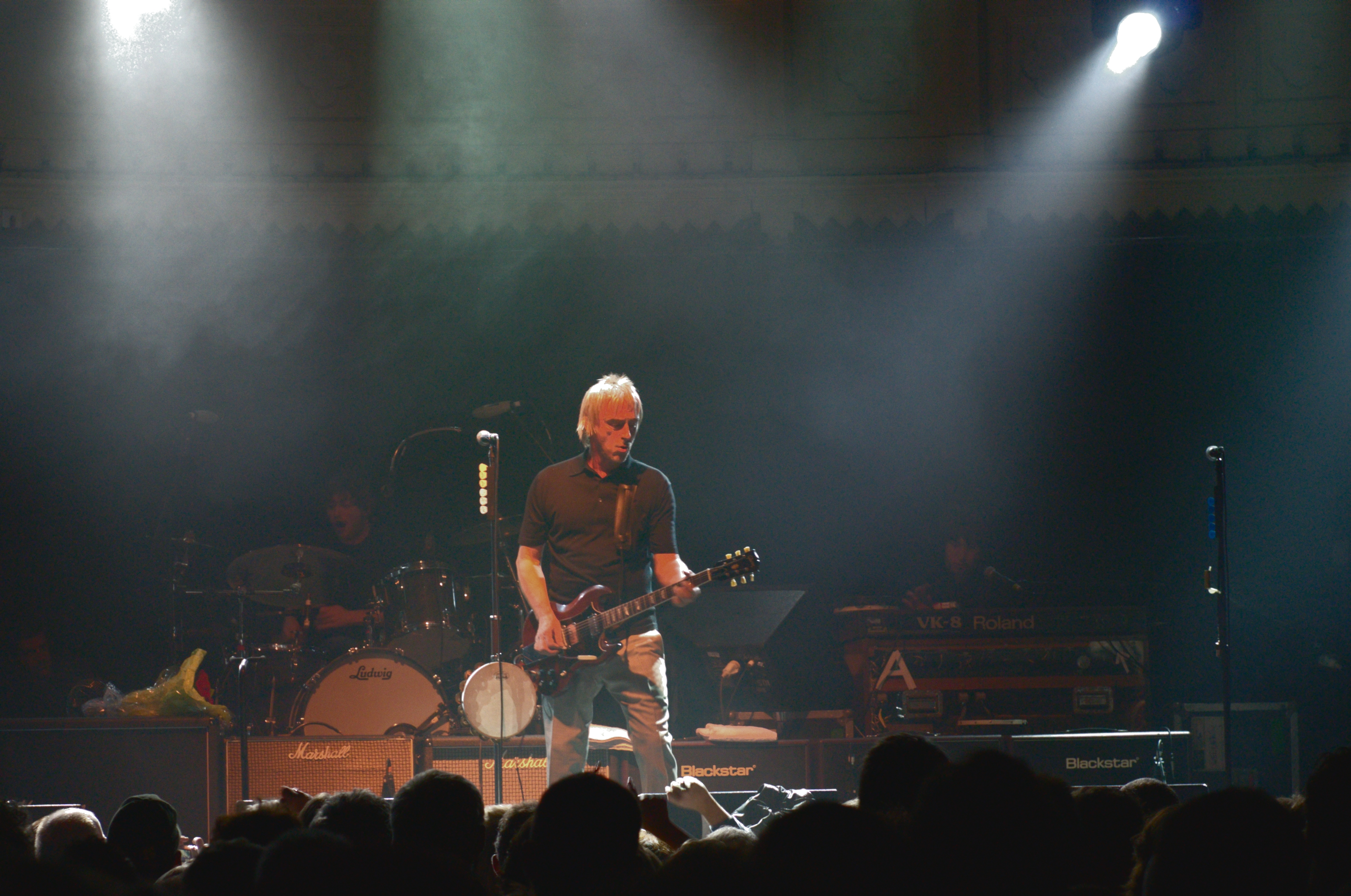
Paul Weller in 2008, the year he released 22 Dreams, his most ambitious album since Confessions.

Although the band went on to record the deep house album Modernism: A New Decade in 1989, Polydor refused to release it, ultimately dropping the band and ending Weller's longtime contract with the label. Weller was angry at the decision: "I thought, I've made all you fuckers millions of pounds." The band subsequently broke up, leaving Modernism: A New Decade unreleased until the 1998 box set The Complete Adventures of The Style Council, a comprehensive box set of the band's material, including all of the songs from Confessions of a Pop Group. Polydor released a remastered CD of Confessions of a Pop Group in 2000. Confessions was re-released again alongside the band's other albums in the Classic Album Selection box set in 2013. A vinyl re-issue of the album was released in September 2017, alongside a double LP version of Modernism: A New Decade.

In 1991, after a stint with a group called The Paul Weller Movement, Weller launched his solo career with Go! Discs, initially featuring a more organic, rootsier sound mixing influences of soul music and rock group Traffic, pushing him away from the ambitions of the Style Council. Nonetheless, Weller would later take a more ambitious route that drew comparisons to Confessions. Writing for Record Collector, John Reed later wrote that Weller's solo album 22 Dreams (2008) "shares the passionate schizophrenia" as Confessions of a Pop Group and the Beatles' White Album, an opinion echoed by Lewis who felt that 22 Dreams was Weller's most adventurous album since Confessions. Jason Fox of the NME also cited the raga instrumental "Spring (at Last)", from 2002's Illumination, as falling "almost in Confessions of a Pop Group territory."

== Track listing ==
All tracks written by Paul Weller, except track number 4 by Talbot.

New York; Gstaad: The Piano Paintings
No.	Title	Length
1.	"It's a Very Deep Sea"	5:32
2.	"The Story of Someone's Shoe"	3:40
3.	"Changing of the Guard"	2:49
4.	"The Little Boy in a Castle" i) The Little Boy in a Castle ii) A Dove Flew Down from the Elephant"	3:01
5.	"The Gardener of Eden (A Three Piece Suite)" i) In the Beginning ii) The Gardener of Eden iii) Mourning the Passing of Time"	10:29
Total length:		25:31

Tokyo; Marble Arch: Confessions of a Pop Group
No.	Title	Length
1.	"Life at a Top People's Health Farm"	4:18
2.	"Why I Went Missing"	4:43
3.	"How She Threw It All Away"	4:17
4.	"Iwasadoledadstoyboy"	4:27
5.	"Confessions 1, 2 & 3"	4:43
6.	"Confessions of a Pop Group"	9:26
Total length:		31:54

Note: The above is the track listing for the UK release. In the US, the original halves of the album were reversed, with side B coming first, followed by side A.

== Personnel ==
=== The Style Council ===
- Paul Weller – vocals, guitars, synthesizer, drum programming
- Mick Talbot – piano, Hammond organ, clavinet, synthesizer, drum programming
- Dee C. Lee – vocals

==== Additional musicians ====
- Paul Morgan – contra bass (1, 3)
- Frank Ricotti – vibraphone (2)
- The Swingle Singers – backing vocals (2)
- Steve White – drums (3, 5, 7, 10)
- Nick Brown – drums (8)
- Camelle Hinds – bass (5, 7, 8, 10), backing vocals (10)
- Rupert Parker – harp (5)
- Dick Morrissey – flute (8)
- Little Jo Ruocco – percussion (8, 11)
- Chris Lawrence – trombone (10)
- John Mealing – vocal arrangements (2), string and horn arrangements

=== Technical ===
- Produced by Paul Weller and Mick Talbot
- Engineered by Jeremy Wakefield
- Assistant engineer – Jatin Savaria
- Design – The Style Council and Simon Halfon
- Paintings – Dan Davies
- Photography – Lawrence Watson

== Charts ==
Chart (1988)	Peak position
Australian (Kent Music Report)	60
