= The Merton Parkas =

British band

The Merton Parkas were an English mod revival band, formed in the Merton area of South London (Merton Park is a suburb of Merton, and a parka is a type of hooded coat which was popular among mods) in the mid-1970s, by Danny Talbot (vocals and guitar), his brother, Mick Talbot (keyboards), Neil Hurrell (bass) and Simon Smith (drums).

The group was discovered playing in a pub in Clapham, South London, by Alan Anger, a punk journalist, and signed with the independent record label, Beggars Banquet. They originally called themselves "The Sneekers", and were one of a group of power pop bands that included The Pleasers. The Merton Parkas released a few moderately successful singles, such as: "You Need Wheels", "Plastic Smile", "Give it to Me Now" and "Put Me in the Picture". They also released one album, Face in the Crowd. Rick Buckler of The Jam played with the band at Ronnie Scotts, and Mick Talbot played on "Heatwave", a track on The Jam's 1979 album Setting Sons.

The Merton Parkas also appeared at the Bridge House, Canning Town, but due to contractual disputes between record labels, did not feature on the 1979 album, Mods Mayday. However the un-released recording of their set at the Bridge House can be found on YouTube.

The band's most notable track was "You Need Wheels", which reached No. 40 in the UK Singles Chart in the summer of 1979. As this was their only success in that chart, they are regarded as one-hit wonders in the UK.

After The Merton Parkas disbanded in 1980, Mick Talbot went on to play with Dexys Midnight Runners, The Bureau, and The Style Council. Simon Smith joined the psychedelic revival band, Mood Six. Danny Talbot became a chemistry teacher and worked at Clapham College School for Boys.

== See also ==
- Merton Park
- List of Peel sessions
- List of bands from England
- Mod revival
- List of performers on Top of the Pops
