= Introducing The Style Council =

1983 studio LP by The Style Council

Studio album by the Style Council
- Released: 1983
- Recorded: June 1983
- Studio: La Studio Grande Armée (Paris)
- Genres: Pop; new wave; soul
- Length: 31:21
- Label: Polydor
- Producers: Paul Weller; Peter Wilson

The Style Council chronology
| Introducing The Style Council (1983) | Café Bleu (1984) |

Professional ratings
Review scores
| Source | Rating |
|---|---|
| AllMusic | 4.5/5 stars |
| Q | 3/5 stars |
| Rolling Stone | 4/5 stars |
| Uncut | 7/10 |
| The Village Voice | B |

Introducing The Style Council is a mini-LP by the English band the Style Council, released in 1983. It was released only in Australia, New Zealand, Canada, the United States, Japan, and the Netherlands. Though not officially released in the United Kingdom, the Dutch release was heavily imported.

Introducing The Style Council includes tracks from the band's first three UK single releases, as well as the club mix version of "Long Hot Summer". The band's official, full-length studio album, Café Bleu, was released the following year.

== Track listing ==
All tracks are written by Paul Weller, except where noted.

| No. | Title | Writer(s) | Length |
|---|---|---|---|
| 1. | "Long Hot Summer" | | 7:04 |
| 2. | "Headstart for Happiness" | | 2:52 |
| 3. | "Speak Like a Child" | | 3:20 |
| 4. | "Long Hot Summer" (club mix) | | 6:57 |
| 5. | "The Paris Match" | | 3:50 |
| 6. | "Mick's Up" | Mick Talbot | 3:13 |
| 7. | "Money-Go-Round" (club mix) | | 7:45 |
| Total length: | | | 35:00 |

New Zealand cassette edition bonus tracks
| No. | Title | Length |
|---|---|---|
| 1. | "Party Chambers" | 3:20 |
| 2. | "Le Depart" | 2:47 |
| Total length: | | 41:07 |

== Personnel ==
==== The Style Council ====
- Paul Weller – vocals, guitar
- Mick Talbot – piano, keyboards, synthesizers, organ
- Steve White – drums
- Zeke Manyika – drums
- Tracie Young – backing vocals

==== Technical ====
- Produced by Peter Wilson and Paul Weller
- Remixed by Bert Bevans (4, 7)
- Design – Simon Halfon and Paul Weller
- Photography – Peter Anderson

== Charts ==
| Chart (1983) | Peak position |
|---|---|
| Australian Albums (Kent Music Report) | 29 |
| Canada Top Albums/CDs (RPM) | 44 |
| Japanese Albums (Oricon) | 69 |
| New Zealand Albums (RMNZ) | 6 |
| US Billboard 200 | 172 |
