= Boy Who Cried Wolf (song) =

Single by the Style Council

from the album Our Favourite Shop
- Released: 1985
- Label: Polydor
- Songwriter: Paul Weller
- Producers: Peter Wilson and Paul Weller

The Style Council singles chronology
"The Lodgers" (1985)	"Boy Who Cried Wolf" (1985)	"(When You) Call Me" (1985)

"Boy Who Cried Wolf" is a song by the English band the Style Council which was their twelfth single to be released. It was composed by lead singer Paul Weller, and was released in 1985. It is the fourth single from the band's second album, Our Favourite Shop (1985). Our Favourite Shop was renamed Internationalists in the United States. However, the single was not released in UK.

== Compilation appearances ==
As well as the song's single release, it has only been featured on two compilation albums released by The Style Council. The song was included on The Complete Adventures of The Style Council in 1998, and The Collection in 2001.

== Track listing ==
- 12" Single (883 280–1)
1. "Boy Who Cried Wolf" – 3:34
2. "Our Favourite Shop (Club Mix)" – 4:12
3. "(When You) Call Me" – 3:16
4. "The Lodgers (Club Mix)" – 3:46
- 7" Single (883 280–7)
1. "Boy Who Cried Wolf" – 3:34
2. "(When You) Call Me" – 3:16

== Charts ==
Chart (1985)	Peak position
Australian Singles Chart	38
New Zealand Singles Chart	21
