= The Cost of Loving =

1987 studio album by The Style Council

- UK cover

Studio album by the Style Council
- Released: February 2, 1987
- Recorded: May – October 1986
- Studio: Solid Bond (London)
- Genres: Sophisti-pop; soul
- Length: 42:12
- Label: Polydor
- Producer: Paul Weller

The Style Council chronology
| Home and Abroad (1986) | The Cost of Loving (1987) | Confessions of a Pop Group (1988) |

Alternative cover
- US cover

The Cost of Loving is the third studio album by the English band the Style Council, released by Polydor Records on 2 February 1987. Recorded over three months in 1986 at Solid Bond Studios in London (owned by lead vocalist Paul Weller), the album is generally regarded as the beginning of the band's shift towards a smoother, more adult-oriented sound. It reached number 2 on the UK Albums Chart and was certified gold by the British Phonographic Industry. The album spawned two singles, "It Didn't Matter" and "Waiting", both of which were accompanied by music videos. "It Didn't Matter" reached the top 10 of the UK Singles Chart, "Waiting" failed to enter the top 40, marking the first time a Style Council single failed to do so.

Upon its release, The Cost of Loving received mixed reviews from music journalists. It is now generally regarded as a turning point in the band's career, foreshadowing the musical directions explored on Confessions of a Pop Group (1988) and Modernism: A New Decade (1998), while also marking the beginning of the band's decline in commercial and critical standing. The band members have also been openly critical of the album.

== Production and recording ==
This album saw the group concentrating on the R&B styles that had been growing in America during the eighties. The album included a cover version of "Angel," a song originally recorded by Anita Baker for her debut solo studio album, The Songstress (1983). Its urban contemporary feel was a jolt to listeners who had grown accustomed to the continental mix of soul music, jazz, and European folk styles that the band had displayed on their previous two studio albums. United States label Geffen Records heard the tracks and promptly dropped the Style Council from their roster. Socially conscious soul music pioneer Curtis Mayfield was asked to mix some of the material on the album, which displays hints of being influenced by house music and the Jimmy Jam and Terry Lewis sound. Tracks from the album were included in a 37-minute film, Jerusalem, about the band.

== Cover art ==
The initial British pressings of the album were conceived and issued as two 12" EPs in a gatefold sleeve (designed by Simon Halfon with ideas from Paul Weller). PolyGram records would eventually issue the album Stateside without its much-maligned international orange jacket design. When asked by Uncut magazine whether the album cover was intended as "a citric version of The Beatles' White Album?", Weller replied that "the only thing" he "can say in its defence is that it's in some book as one of the top 100 album sleeves."

== Critical reception ==
Professional ratings
Review scores
| Source | Rating |
|---|---|
| AllMusic | 2/5 stars |
| Q | 3/5 stars |
| Record Collector | 3/5 stars |
| The Rolling Stone Album Guide | 2/5 stars |
| Sounds | 3/5 stars |
| Uncut | 5/10 |

In a retrospective review for AllMusic, critic Stephen Thomas Erlewine wrote, "Filled with bland, professional soul-pop, few of the songs have memorable melodies and the band tends to meander through the slick arrangements." He further noted that "Weller's lyrics were self-important and under-developed, with only the hit single 'It Didn't Matter' making a lasting impression among the undistinguished songs that comprised the majority of the album."

Alfie Vera Mella of Cryptic Rock was more positive. In his retrospective review for the album's 30th anniversary, he stated, "The classy touch of The Cost of Loving continues to be a reminder of the band's [the Style Council's] predilection for slick, smooth, big sound; less simple song structures; as well as jazzy and bluesy instrumentation. That in mind, the album has aged gracefully and become even more enjoyable thirty years later."

In 1991, the NME included the album in a list of fourteen albums that "should've been an EP".

== Track listing ==
All tracks are written by Paul Weller, except where noted.

Side one
| No. | Title | Writer(s) | Length |
|---|---|---|---|
| 1. | "It Didn't Matter" | Paul Weller; Mick Talbot | 5:44 |
| 2. | "Right to Go" | Weller; Steve White; The Dynamic Three | 5:10 |

Side two
| No. | Title | Length |
|---|---|---|
| 3. | "Heavens Above" | 6:10 |
| 4. | "Fairy Tales" | 4:08 |

Side three
| No. | Title | Writer(s) | Length |
|---|---|---|---|
| 5. | "Angel" | Patrick Moten; Richard Griffin; Sandra Sully | 4:31 |
| 6. | "Walking the Night" | | 4:30 |

Side four
| No. | Title | Length |
|---|---|---|
| 7. | "Waiting" | 4:26 |
| 8. | "The Cost of Loving" | 4:19 |
| 9. | "A Woman's Song" | 3:02 |
| Total length: | | 42:12 |

== Personnel ==
=== The Style Council ===
- Paul Weller – lead vocals, backing vocals, guitars, synthesizers, drum programs
- Mick Talbot – piano, Rhodes, Wurlitzer, Hammond organ, synthesizers, bass synths
- Steve White – drums, percussion
- Dee C. Lee – lead vocals, backing vocals

=== Additional musicians ===
- Jeremy Wakefield – sequencing
- The Dynamic Three – rapping (2)
- Steve Sidelynk – percussion (2), congas (3, 4)
- Camelle Hinds – bass (3, 5, 6)
- Anne Stephenson – violin (3)
- Billy Chapman – saxophone (3)
- Guy Barker – trumpet (4), flugelhorn (6)
- Roddy Lorimer – trumpet (4), flugelhorn (6)
- Luke Tunney – trumpet (4), flugelhorn (6)
- Ashley Slater – trombone (4)
- Chris Lawrence – trombone (4)
- Peter Thoms – trombone (4)
- John Valentine – backing vocals (6)
- John Mealing – orchestral arrangements

=== Technical ===
- Produced by Paul Weller
- Engineered by Jeremy Wakefield (2), Alan Leeming (8)
- Mixed by John Valentine (1, 5, 7), Billy Valentine (1, 5), Jeremy Wakefield (2), Matthew Kasha (3), Curtis Mayfield (4), Carl Beatty (6), Alan Leeming (8)
- Design – The Style Council and Simon Halfon
- Photography – Nick Knight

== Charts ==
| Chart (1987) | Peak position |
|---|---|
| Australian Albums (Kent Music Report) | 24 |
| Canada Top Albums/CDs (RPM) | 58 |
| Dutch Albums (Album Top 100) | 23 |
| German Albums (Offizielle Top 100) | 45 |
| Japanese Albums (Oricon) | 6 |
| New Zealand Albums (RMNZ) | 35 |
| Swedish Albums (Sverigetopplistan) | 46 |
| UK Albums (Official Charts) | 2 |
| US Billboard 200 | 122 |

== Certifications ==
| Region | Certification | Certified units/sales |
|---|---|---|
| United Kingdom (BPI) | Gold | 100,000^{^} |
^{^} Shipments figures based on certification alone.

== See also ==
- List of albums released in 1987
