= A Solid Bond in Your Heart =

Single by the Style Council

from the album My Ever Changing Moods (US version of Café Bleu)
- B-side: "It Just Came to Pieces in My Hands"
- Written: 1982
- Released: 11 November 1983
- Genre: Soul
- Label: Polydor
- Songwriter: Paul Weller
- Producer: Peter Wilson

The Style Council singles chronology
"Long Hot Summer" (1983)	"A Solid Bond in Your Heart" (1983)	"My Ever Changing Moods" (1984)

"A Solid Bond in Your Heart" is a song by English band the Style Council, released as a single in 1983. It was written by lead singer Paul Weller. The song reached No. 11 on the UK Singles Chart and No. 14 on the Irish Singles Chart. Weller wrote the song in 1982 while a member of the Jam, with whom he recorded a demo version which was released in 1992 on Extras, a Jam compilation album. It had been earmarked to be the Jam's final single until the band decided to release "Beat Surrender".

"It Just Came to Pieces in My Hands" is the B-side.
