= The Complete Adventures of The Style Council =

Box set by the Style Council
- Released: 26 October 1998
- Recorded: 1983–1989
- Length: 382:38
- Label: Polydor
- Producers: Paul Weller, Peter Wilson, Mick Talbot, The Style Council

The Style Council chronology
The Style Council Collection (1996)	The Complete Adventures of The Style Council (1998)	Greatest Hits (2000)

Professional ratings
Review scores
Source	Rating
AllMusic	4/5 stars

The Complete Adventures of The Style Council is a box set by the English pop band the Style Council, released on 26 October 1998, nine years after their break-up. Released after the success of 1997's Direction Reaction Creation, a box set of Paul Weller's previous band the Jam, this box set takes a similar approach, with the five discs compiling all of the Style Council's studio albums with all the non-album singles, B-sides and EP tracks interspersed chronologically. In cases where the single and album versions of the same song are radically different (such as "My Ever Changing Moods"), both versions are included. The box set also includes the group's previously unreleased final studio album Modernism: A New Decade, which was recorded and intended for release in 1989.

Allmusic reviewed the box set, saying "for most listeners, including some serious Weller fans, The Style Council is best appreciated as a singles band, but for the dedicated, The Complete Adventures reveals that the Style Council, no matter how maddening they could be, were a group that continually reinvented themselves, occasionally making some remarkable music along the way."

== Track listing ==
=== Disc one ===
1. "Speak Like a Child" – 3:18
2. "Party Chambers" – 3:22
3. "Money-Go-Round (Parts 1 & 2)" – 7:29
4. "Headstart for Happiness" ("Money-Go-Round" B-side version) – 2:50
5. "Mick's Up" – 3:13
6. "Long Hot Summer" (The Style Council á Paris 12" EP version) – 7:03
7. "The Paris Match" (The Style Council á Paris EP version) – 3:46
8. "Le Départ" – 2:49
9. "A Solid Bond In Your Heart" – 3:18
10. "It Just Came to Pieces In My Hands" – 2:32
11. "My Ever Changing Moods" (12" single version) – 5:43
12. "Mick's Company" – 2:49
13. "Spring, Summer, Autumn" – 2:24
14. "Mick's Blessings" – 1:17
15. "The Whole Point of No Return" – 2:44
16. "Me Ship Came In!" – 3:08
17. "Blue Cafe" – 2:18
18. "The Paris Match" (album version) – 4:27
19. "My Ever Changing Moods" (album version) – 3:39
20. "Dropping Bombs on the Whitehouse" – 3:15
21. "A Gospel" – 4:47

=== Disc two ===
1. "Strength of Your Nature" – 4:21
2. "You're the Best Thing" (album version) – 5:42
3. "Here's One That Got Away" – 2:37
4. "Headstart for Happiness" (album version) – 3:22
5. "Council Meetin'" – 2:34
6. "The Big Boss Groove" – 4:40
7. "Shout to the Top!" – 4:16
8. "Ghosts of Dachau" – 2:51
9. "The Piccadilly Trail" – 3:45
10. "Soul Deep" 7:12
11. "Walls Come Tumbling Down" – 3:25
12. "The Whole Point II" – 2:51
13. "Blood Sports" – 3:36
14. "Spin' Drifting" – 3:11
15. "Homebreakers" – 5:03
16. "All Gone Away" – 2:17
17. "Come to Milton Keynes" – 3:05
18. "Internationalists" – 3:06
19. "A Stones Throw Away" – 2:19
20. "The Stand Up Comic's Instructions" – 1:33
21. "Boy Who Cried Wolf" – 5:29

=== Disc three ===
1. "A Man of Great Promise" – 2:35
2. "Down in the Seine" – 2:44
3. "The Lodgers (or She Was Only a Shopkeeper's Daughter)" – 3:58
4. "Luck" – 2:36
5. "With Everything To Lose" – 3:56
6. "Our Favourite Shop" – 2:55
7. "(When You) Call Me" – 3:20
8. "Have You Ever Had It Blue" – 4:48
9. "Mr. Cool's Dream" – 2:28
10. "It Didn't Matter" – 5:45
11. "All Year Round" – 2:18
12. "Right To Go" – 5:12
13. "Heavens Above" – 6:13
14. "Fairy Tales" – 4:09
15. "Angel" – 4:32
16. "Walking the Night" – 4:32
17. "Waiting" – 4:27
18. "The Cost of Loving" (album version) – 4:20
19. "A Woman's Song" – 3:03
20. "Francoise" – 2:44

=== Disc four ===
1. "Wanted (or Waiter, There's Some Soup In My Flies)" – 3:24
2. "The Cost of Loving" ("Wanted" 12" B-side version) – 3:50
3. "Life at a Top Peoples Health Farm" – 5:48
4. "Sweet Loving Ways" – 3:32
5. "It's a Very Deep Sea" – 5:34
6. "The Story of Someone's Shoe" – 3:41
7. "Changing of the Guard" – 2:51
8. "The Little Boy in a Castle / A Dove Flew Down from the Elephant" – 3:02
9. "The Gardener Of Eden (A Three Piece Suite)" – 10:32
10. "Why I Went Missing" – 4:46
11. "How She Threw It All Away" – 4:17
12. "Iwasadoledadstoyboy" – 4:27
13. "Confessions 1, 2 & 3" – 4:43
14. "Confessions Of A Pop Group" – 9:27
15. "In Love for the First Time" – 3:39
16. "I Do Like to Be B-Side the A-Side" – 4:47

=== Disc five ===
1. "Promised Land" – 7:05
2. "Can You Still Love Me?" ("Promised Land" B-side version) – 4:20
3. "Long Hot Summer '89" (TOM Mix Full Extended Version) – 5:29
4. "Everybody's on the Run" ("Long Hot Summer '89" B-side version) – 7:58
5. "A New Decade" – 3:24
6. "Can You Still Love Me?" (album version) – 5:01
7. "The World Must Come Together" – 5:23
8. "Hope (Feelings Gonna Getcha)" – 7:16
9. "That Spiritual Feeling" – 7:35
10. "Everybody's on the Run" (album version) – 5:42
11. "Love of the World" – 8:56
12. "Sure Is Sure" – 6:18
