= My Ever Changing Moods =

Single by the Style Council

from the album Café Bleu
- B-side: "Mick's Company"; "Spring, Summer, Autumn" (12" only)
- Released: 10 February 1984
- Studio: Solid Bond (London, UK)
- Genre: Northern soul; sophisti-pop; new wave
- Length: 3:37
- Label: Polydor
- Songwriter: Paul Weller
- Producers: Paul Weller; Peter Wilson

The Style Council singles chronology
"A Solid Bond in Your Heart" (1983)	"My Ever Changing Moods" (1984)	"You're the Best Thing" / "The Big Boss Groove" (1984)

"My Ever Changing Moods" is a song by the English band the Style Council. It was their fifth single to be released.

== Background ==
"My Ever Changing Moods" was composed by lead vocalist Paul Weller, recorded at Weller's own Solid Bond Studios, and was released in 1984. It is the first single from the band's debut studio album, Café Bleu (1984), which was renamed My Ever Changing Moods in the United States to capitalise on the success of that single.

"My Ever Changing Moods," backed with the Hammond organ instrumental "Mick's Company", peaked at No. 29 on the Billboard Hot 100 the week of 9 June 1984, in the US. The song remains Weller's greatest success in the US (including his efforts in the Jam and as a solo artist).

== Versions ==
The album version features vocals by Weller only accompanied by acoustic piano. This version is 3:37 long.

There are two versions of the song with full band accompaniment. The 7" single version is 4:02 minutes long, while the 12" single version is 5:44 minutes long.

Weller released a new version of "My Ever Changing Moods" on his album An Orchestrated Songbook in 2021.

== Critical reception ==
In a 2020 article for the Los Angeles Review of Books, Thomas McLean called "My Ever Changing Moods" "one of Weller’s best compositions," identifying the song's debt to the Classics IV's "Stormy" (1968) and its influence on Santana's "The Game of Love". Calling attention to the song's mix of personal and political, McLean reads the song lyric "the hush before the silence, the winds after the blast" as "a potent reference to nuclear fears in the Thatcher/Reagan era" and praises the line "Evil turns to statues," declaring it "as brisk a summing up of commemorative history as I know, and one that takes on new significance in 2020."

== Compilation appearances ==
As well as the song's single release, it has featured on various compilation albums released by The Style Council. The song was included on The Singular Adventures of The Style Council, The Complete Adventures of The Style Council and Greatest Hits.

== Music video ==
The music video for "My Ever Changing Moods," which shows Talbot and Weller cycling down an avenue of trees, was directed by Tim Pope and filmed at Kentwell Hall, Long Melford, Suffolk, UK.

== Track listing ==
- 12" Single (TSC X 5, TSCX5)
1. "My Ever Changing Moods (Long Version)" – 5:44
2. "Spring, Summer, Autumn" – 2:24
3. "Mick's Company" – 2:49
- 7" Single (817 450-7)
1. "My Ever Changing Moods" – 4:02
2. "Mick's Company" – 2:48

== Personnel ==
Credits are adapted from the album's liner notes.

- Paul Weller – lead vocals, guitars
- Mick Talbot – electric piano, organ, backing vocals
- Steve White – drums, percussion
- Peter Wilson – bass synthesizer
- Hilary Seabrook – saxophone
- Barbara Snow – trumpet

== Charts ==
Chart (1984)	Peak position
Australian Singles Chart	70
Canadian Hot 100	42
Billboard Hot 100	29
Billboard Hot R&B/Hip-Hop Songs	88
Billboard Top Tracks	52
Irish Singles Chart	11
New Zealand Singles Chart	32
UK Singles Chart	5
