= Modernism: A New Decade =

Final studio album by the Style Council

Studio album by the Style Council
- Released: August 1989 (unreleased); 19 October 1998
- Recorded: 1989
- Genres: Deep house; garage house; acid house
- Length: 49:45
- Label: Polydor
- Producer: The Style Council

The Style Council chronology
Confessions of a Pop Group (1988)	Modernism: A New Decade (1989)

Professional ratings
Review scores
Source	Rating
AllMusic	2/5 stars
Q	3/5 stars
Record Collector	3/5 stars
Uncut	5/10

Modernism: A New Decade is the fifth and final studio album by the English band the Style Council. It marked a departure from the band's established pop sound in favour of deep house, a genre then commonly referred to in the British press as "garage", after New York's Paradise Garage. Completed in 1989, the album was rejected by the band's record label Polydor, a decision that contributed to the group's break up.

The track "That Spiritual Feeling" was re-recorded as a B-side to "Into Tomorrow", the first solo single by Style Council member Paul Weller, released in 1991. The complete album remained unreleased until 1998, when it appeared on the box set The Complete Adventures of The Style Council. A separate edition was subsequently authorised and released on 30 October 2001.

== Music ==
Matteo Sedazzari of Zani said that Modernism "indicates Weller embracing a new music genre, house music, with its origins stemming from the young Chicago blacks in the early eighties experimenting with bass synthesizers and drum machines with samples." Weller later said, "I loved all the black house music that was coming out of Chicago and New Jersey, which I just thought was really soulful." Weller is a well-documented fan of soul music, saying "it connects a lot of people from all over the world." Penny Black Music considered it the band's "take on the UK deep house and garage scene." Mick Brown of The Daily Telegraph called the album "acid house-styled music". However, Weller "wasn't really big" on acid house, saying, "I liked the East Coast, New Jersey stuff, more. That band, Blaze, I really liked. For the first time in a long time, I could hear the gospel influence, and it was still pretty much underground." In 1989, the Style Council released the non-album single "Promised Land", a "wonderfully gospel-tinged" cover of a song by Chicago house producer Joe Smooth.

Weller was pleased with the album. He said that although he "wasn't jumping around the room," which he added "is probably a bad sign," he "liked it" regardless. Detroit techno pioneer Juan Atkins produced some remixes for the band, but Weller was dissatisfied with them, finding that "what we were doing ourselves was better."

== Legacy ==
Writer Valerie Siebert said that she "felt with the Style Council that [Weller] managed to keep slightly ahead of the curve in terms of trends," and later asked Weller in an interview for The Quietus that, "with Modernism: A New Decade, do you think you were just a little too ahead, seeing as that type of music would become huge a few years later?" Weller replied, "I guess so yeah, it might have been that it was too early. But yeah at the time, for me, it was pretty cutting edge. But the record company didn't like it – they hated it actually! They didn't understand it whatsoever. They just thought it was going to be the final nail in my career coffin. And then that's why we split. But you know, sometimes you're ahead of the game and sometimes people don't get it and that's just one of those things you have to accept and carry on." Weller said he would have "probably moved on to something else" by the time that house music became "a huge thing a few years later."

== Track listing ==
1998 release on The Complete Adventures of The Style Council and 2001 release
No.	Title	Writer(s)	Length
1.	"A New Decade"	Paul Weller	3:24
2.	"Can You Still Love Me?"	Dee C. Lee; Mick Talbot; Weller	5:01
3.	"The World Must Come Together"	Weller	5:23
4.	"Hope (Feelings Gonna Getcha)"	Lee; Talbot; Weller	7:16
5.	"That Spiritual Feeling"	Lee; Talbot; Weller; Marco Nelson	7:35
6.	"Everybody's on the Run"	Lee; Weller	5:42
7.	"Love of the World"	Weller	8:56
8.	"Sure Is Sure"	Weller; Camelle Hinds	6:18

2017 release
No.	Title	Writer(s)	Length
1.	"A New Decade"	Weller	3:24
2.	"Love of the World"	Weller	8:56
3.	"The World Must Come Together"	Weller	5:23
4.	"Hope (Feelings Gonna Getcha)"	Lee; Talbot; Weller	7:16
5.	"Can You Still Love Me?"	Lee; Talbot; Weller	5:01
6.	"That Spiritual Feeling"	Lee; Talbot; Weller; Nelson	7:35
7.	"Everybody's on the Run"	Lee; Weller	5:42
8.	"Sure Is Sure"	Weller; Hinds	6:18

== Personnel ==
The Style Council

- Paul Weller – vocals, guitars
- Mick Talbot – keyboards
- Dee C. Lee – vocals
- Steve White – drums

== See also ==
- Road to Freedom (1991)
- Paul Weller (1992)
