= You're the Best Thing =

Single by the Style Council

from the album Café Bleu
- B-side: "The Big Boss Groove"
- Released: 18 May 1984
- Studio: Solid Bond (London, UK)
- Genre: Blue-eyed soul; pop rock
- Length: 5:45 (original album version); 4:18 (single version)
- Label: Polydor
- Songwriter: Paul Weller
- Producers: Paul Weller; Peter Wilson

The Style Council singles chronology
"My Ever Changing Moods" (1984)	"You're the Best Thing" (1984)	"Shout to the Top!" (1984)

"You're the Best Thing" is a song by the English band the Style Council which was their sixth single to be released. It was composed by lead singer Paul Weller, recorded at Weller's own studio Solid Bond Studios, and was released in 1984. It is the second single from the band's début album, Café Bleu (1984). Café Bleu was renamed My Ever Changing Moods in the United States to capitalise on the success of the first single. It spent five weeks on the US Billboard Hot 100, peaking at number 76 the weeks of July 28 and August 4, 1984.

== Versions ==
The 7-inch single version of the song adds a saxophone solo that is not present in the original album version. Certain editions of the My Ever Changing Moods album in the U.S. feature this single version in place of the full-length album version that appeared on all editions of Café Bleu.

In the UK and Australia, the song was released as a Double A-sided single with "The Big Boss Groove". In the UK it was officially an EP titled Groovin'. Edited versions of both songs appeared on the 7-inch release.

== Compilation appearances ==
As well as the song's single release, it has featured on various compilation albums released by The Style Council. The song was included on The Singular Adventures of The Style Council, The Complete Adventures of The Style Council, and Greatest Hits.

== Music video ==
The music video for "You're the Best Thing" was directed by Tim Pope.

== Track listings ==
7-inch single (UK)

1. "You're The Best Thing" — 4:18
2. "The Big Boss Groove" — 3:40

12-inch single (UK)

1. "You're The Best Thing" (Long Version) — 5:41
2. "You're The Dub Thing" — 4:58
3. "The Big Boss Groove" — 4:39

== Personnel ==
All information per the My Ever Changing Moods (American version of Café Bleu) album liner notes and the "You're the Best Thing" single liner notes:

The Style Council

- Paul Weller – lead vocals and backing vocals, guitars, and synthesizer
- Mick Talbot – vocals, synth bass, and additional keyboards
- Steve White – drums and percussions

with:

- Peter Wilson – drum programming, string arrangements (single version only)
- Billy Chapman – saxophone (single version only)

== Charts ==
=== Weekly charts ===
Chart (1984)	Peak position
Australia (Kent Music Report)	17
Canadian Hot 100	97
Irish Singles Chart	5
New Zealand (Recorded Music NZ)	7
UK Singles Chart	5
U.S. Billboard Hot 100	76
U.S. Billboard Adult Contemporary	31

=== Year-end charts ===
Chart (1984)	Position
Australia (Kent Music Report)	92
United Kingdom (Gallup)	92

== Certifications ==
Region	Certification	Certified units/sales
United Kingdom (BPI)	Silver	200,000^{‡}
^{‡} Sales+streaming figures based on certification alone.
