= Our Favourite Shop =

1985 studio album by The Style Council

Studio album by The Style Council
- Released: May 31, 1985
- Recorded: December 1984 – March 1985
- Studio: Solid Bond (London)
- Genres: Sophisti-pop; jazz
- Length: 49:01
- Label: Polydor
- Producers: Paul Weller; Peter Wilson

The Style Council chronology
Café Bleu (1984)	Our Favourite Shop (1985)	Home and Abroad (1986)

Our Favourite Shop (released as Internationalists in the United States) is the second studio album by the English band the Style Council. Recorded ten months after the band's debut, Café Bleu, it was released on 31 May 1985 on Polydor. It features guest vocalists including Lenny Henry, Tracie Young, and Dee C Lee. The album includes "Come to Milton Keynes", "The Lodgers", "Boy Who Cried Wolf", and "Walls Come Tumbling Down!", which were all released as singles (with corresponding music videos). The three singles released in the UK all reached the top 40 on the UK charts. The track listing was reconfigured for the U.S. release.

The Style Council's most commercially successful album, it was an immediate commercial and critical success, and remained at the top of the charts for one week, displacing Brothers in Arms by Dire Straits. The album was the Style Council's only number one album in the UK. According to the BPI, the record sold over 100,000 copies and was certified gold.

The multigenre album incorporates diverse stylistic influences, including soul, rap, jazz and rock styles. Recording was completed in March 1985. The cover, depicting the band posing inside a shop, was designed by Paul Weller and British artist Simon Halfon.

== Contents ==
"I had a total belief in the Style Council. I was obsessed in the early years. I lived and breathed it all. I meant every word, and felt every action. Our Favourite Shop was its culmination." — Paul Weller, 2006

The album features fourteen original compositions (eight by Paul Weller, four co-written by Weller and Mick Talbot, and one co-written by Weller with Steve White), with one instrumental from Talbot, in its original British form.

Lyrical targets include racism, excessive consumerism, the effects of self-serving governments, the suicide of one of Weller's friends and what the band saw as an exasperating lack of opposition to the status quo. All of this pessimism is countered with an overarching sense of hope and delight that alternatives do actually exist—if only they can be seen. They also took a more overtly political approach than The Jam in their lyrics, with tracks such as "Walls Come Tumbling Down", "The Lodgers", and "Come to Milton Keynes" being deliberate attacks on 'middle England' and Thatcherite principles prevalent in the 1980s. "A Man of Great Promise" was Weller's eulogy to his school friend and early Jam member - Dave Waller - who had died from a heroin overdose in August 1982.

The track "With Everything to Lose", featuring a political lyric written by Steve White, used the backing track of the then unreleased song "Have You Ever Had It Blue" which had been written for the soundtrack to the film Absolute Beginners. Re-recorded with the original lyric and released as a single in 1986, "Have You Ever Had It Blue" charted in the top 20 in the UK and top 10 in Ireland.

== Release ==
The majority of the album's material was released (with different sequencing and packaged with an entirely different cover design) in the USA as Internationalists by Geffen Records (which has been a sister label to Polydor Records, the band's UK label, since 1998, under Universal Music Group).

Included on the UK, US, and Canadian pressings, most countries omitted the track "The Stand Up Comic's Instructions" as it was believed that its ironic satire of racist attitudes would be misunderstood. The guest vocalist was the black British comedian, Lenny Henry imitating comedians such as Bernard Manning and Jim Davidson.

== Critical reception ==
Professional ratings
Review scores
Source	Rating
AllMusic	4.5/5 stars
Mojo	4/5 stars
Q	4/5 stars
Record Collector	5/5 stars
Record Mirror	4/5
The Rolling Stone Album Guide	3.5/5 stars
Sounds	4/5 stars
Spin	4/5 stars
Uncut	9/10
The Village Voice	B+

While receiving some mixed reviews on its release in 1985, it was widely considered to be the band's best work by contemporary critics.

In his "Consumer Guide" column for The Village Voice, Robert Christgau wrote: "One reason Paul Weller's rock and roll never convinced non-Brits was his reedy voice, which he has no trouble bending to the needs of the fussy phonographic cabaret he undertook so quixotically and affectedly after retiring the Jam. I'm sure the move has cost him audience, but the new format suits the specifics of his socialism."

Retrospectively, Stephen Thomas Erlewine of AllMusic wrote that Our Favourite Shop "was still quite eclectic, but it didn't seem as schizophrenically diverse as Café Bleu", praising it as a "more cohesive and stronger" album.

== Track listing ==
All songs written by Paul Weller, except where noted.

Side one
No.	Title	Length
1.	"Homebreakers" (Mick Talbot, Paul Weller)	5:04
2.	"All Gone Away"	2:13
3.	"Come to Milton Keynes"	3:02
4.	"Internationalists" (Talbot, Weller)	3:04
5.	"A Stones Throw Away"	2:15
6.	"The Stand Up Comic's Instructions"	1:28
7.	"Boy Who Cried Wolf"	5:04

Side two
No.	Title	Length
1.	"A Man of Great Promise"	2:30
2.	"Down in the Seine"	2:41
3.	"The Lodgers (Or She Was Only a Shopkeeper's Daughter)" (Talbot, Weller)	3:54
4.	"Luck" (Talbot, Weller)	2:32
5.	"With Everything to Lose" (Steve White, Weller)	3:45
6.	"Our Favourite Shop" (Talbot)	2:52
7.	"Walls Come Tumbling Down!"	3:11

Later CD issues included "Shout to the Top!" (Vision Quest Version) as a bonus track.

Additional track listing

US track listing (released as Internationalists)
In comparison to the UK LP, the US LP omits one track ("Our Favourite Shop"), and adds one ("Shout to the Top!").: 1. "Homebreakers"; 2. "All Gone Away"; 3. "Come to Milton Keynes"; 4. "Internationalists"; 5. "A Stones Throw Away"; 6. "The Stand Up Comic's Instructions"; 7. "Boy Who Cried Wolf"; 8. "A Man of Great Promise"; 9. "Down in the Seine"; 10. "The Lodgers (Or She Was Only a Shopkeeper's Daughter)"; 11. "Luck"; 12. "With Everything to Lose"; 13. "Shout to the Top!" ("Vision Quest" Version); 14. "Walls Come Tumbling Down!"

Australia/New Zealand track listing
In comparison to the UK LP, the Australia/New Zealand LP omits "The Stand Up Comic's Instructions", and adds "Shout to the Top!".: 1. "Homebreakers"; 2. "All Gone Away"; 3. "Come to Milton Keynes"; 4. "Internationalists"; 5. "A Stones Throw Away"; 6. "Shout to the Top!"; 7. "With Everything to Lose"; 1. "A Man of Great Promise"; 2. "Down in the Seine"; 3. "The Lodgers (Or She Was Only a Shopkeeper's Daughter)"; 4. "Luck"; 5. "Boy Who Cried Wolf"; 6. "Our Favourite Shop"; 7. "Walls Come Tumbling Down"

Deluxe edition track listing
Disc One: 1. "Homebreakers"; 2. "All Gone Away"; 3. "Come to Milton Keynes"; 4. "Internationalists"; 5. "A Stones Throw Away"; 6. "The Stand Up Comics Instructions"; 7. "Boy Who Cried Wolf"; 8. "A Man of Great Promise"; 9. "Down in the Seine"; 10. "The Lodgers (Or She Was Only a Shopkeeper's Daughter)"; 11. "Luck"; 12. "With Everything to Lose"; 13. "Our Favourite Shop"; 14. "Walls Come Tumbling Down"; 15. "Shout to the Top (USA Mix)"; 16. "Shout to the Top (Instrumental)"; Disc Two: 1. "The Piccadilly Trail"; 2. "Ghosts of Dachau"; 3. "Spin Drifting"; 4. "The Whole Point II"; 5. "Blood Sports"; 6. "(When You) Call Me"; 7. "Our Favourite Shop (Club Mix)"; 8. "The Lodgers (Club Mix)"; 9. "The Lodgers (Extended Mix)"; 10. "The Big Boss Groove (Live)"; 11. "Move on Up (Live)"; 12. "You're the Best Thing (Live)"; 13. "Money Go Round Medley: Soul Deep/Strength of Your Nature (Live)"; 14. "A Stone's Throw Away (Demo)"; 15. "(When You) Call Me (Demo)"; 16. "A Casual Affair"; 17. "Soul Deep (Council Collective)"; 18. "Lodger" (The Lodgers demo); 19. "Internationalist" (Internationalists demo); 20. "Everything to Lose (Blue Remix)"; 21. "Our Favourite Shop (Alternate Version)"

== Personnel ==
=== The Style Council ===
- Paul Weller – lead vocals (2–10, 12, 14), guitars, bass, synthesizer
- Mick Talbot – Hammond organ, piano, keyboards, synthesizer, vocals (1)
- Steve White – drums, percussion
- Dee C. Lee – vocals (1, 4, 6, 8, 10–12)

=== Additional musicians ===
- Camille Hinds – bass (1, 4, 6)
- Kevin Millar – bass (12)
- Mike Mower – saxophone (1, 14), flute (2, 12)
- Billy Chapman – saxophone (12)
- Stewart Prosser – trumpet, flugelhorn (1, 8, 14)
- David DeFries – trumpet, flugelhorn (1, 8, 14)
- Chris Lawrence – trombone (1, 8, 14)
- Patrick Grundy-White – French horn (8)
- Gary Wallis – percussion (2)
- Peter Wilson – keyboard sequencing (7)
- Jeremy Wakefield – keyboard sequencing (7)
- Helen Turner – piano (14)
- Clark Kent – contra bass (2, 9)
- Anne Stephenson – violin (5)
- Charlie Buchanan – violin (5)
- Jocelyn Pook – viola (5)
- Audrey Riley – cello (5)
- Lenny Henry – vocals (6)
- Tracie Young – vocals (7)
- John Mealing – orchestration (3), string arrangements (5, 7)

=== Technical ===
- Produced by Paul Weller and Peter Wilson
- Cover photography – Olly Ball
- Inside photography – Nick Knight
- Design – Simon Halfon and Paul Weller

== Charts ==
=== Weekly charts ===
Chart (1985)	Peak position
Australian Albums (Kent Music Report)	5
Austrian Albums (Ö3 Austria)	23
Canada Top Albums/CDs (RPM)	53
Dutch Albums (Album Top 100)	11
German Albums (Offizielle Top 100)	23
Japanese Albums (Oricon)	18
New Zealand Albums (RMNZ)	6
Swedish Albums (Sverigetopplistan)	30
UK Albums (Official Charts)	1
US Billboard 200	123

=== Year-end charts ===
Chart (1985)	Position
Australian Albums (Kent Music Report)	25
New Zealand Albums (RMNZ)	20

== Certifications ==
Region	Certification	Certified units/sales
United Kingdom (BPI)	Gold	100,000^{^}
^{^} Shipments figures based on certification alone.
