= Come to Milton Keynes =

Single by the Style Council

from the album Our Favourite Shop
- Released: 1985
- Genre: Lounge
- Length: 3:02
- Label: Polydor
- Songwriter: Paul Weller
- Producers: Peter Wilson; Paul Weller

The Style Council singles chronology
"Walls Come Tumbling Down!" (1985)	"Come to Milton Keynes" (1985)	"The Lodgers" (1985)

Music video
- "Come to Milton Keynes" on YouTube

"Come to Milton Keynes" is a single by the English pop band the Style Council, released in 1985 by Polydor Records. It was the second single from the band's second studio album, Our Favourite Shop, and it peaked at No. 23 on the UK singles chart and No. 14 on the Irish Singles Chart.

== Background ==
The title refers to Milton Keynes, a new town (and later, city) established in 1967 in Buckinghamshire, midway between London and Birmingham. In an interview given at the time of the song's release, Paul Weller stated that the song was inspired by the "Red Balloon" Milton Keynes advert, which was produced on behalf of the Milton Keynes Development Corporation.

== Critical reception ==
Paul Weller biographer John Reed argues in Paul Weller: My Ever Changing Moods (1996) that:

The song’s lyrics suggested a reality of drugs, violence, and ‘losing our way’ behind a façade of ‘luscious houses ‘ where the ‘curtains are drawn’, the idea being to create a musical pastiche which matched the supposed artificiality of Milton Keynes itself.

More recently, Thomas McLean has called the song "a missing link between the Kinks' "Village Green Preservation Society" and Blur's "Country House"," and "a dark commentary on one of the last of the new towns."
