= The Style Council =

English pop band

- The Style Council in 1988, left to right: Mick Talbot (keyboards) and Paul Weller (vocals)

Background information
- Also known as: King Truman (1989)
- Origin: Woking, Surrey, England
- Genres: Pop; sophisti-pop; blue-eyed soul; new wave; jazz
- Years active: 1982–1989; 1990; 2019
- Labels: Polydor; Geffen
- Spinoffs: The Council Collective; Boogie Box High; Slam Slam
- Spinoff of: The Jam; The Merton Parkas; Central Line
- Past members: Paul Weller; Mick Talbot; Dee C. Lee; Steve White

The Style Council were an English pop band formed in Woking in 1982 by vocalist and guitarist Paul Weller and keyboardist Mick Talbot. Founded shortly after the breakup of Weller's previous band the Jam, the group provided an outlet for his interest in exploring a broader range of musical styles, particularly pop, hip-hop, and soul.

The permanent line-up later expanded to include drummer Steve White and vocalist Dee C. Lee, then Weller's girlfriend. Other artists, including Tracie Young, Tracey Thorn of Everything but the Girl, and drummer and percussionist Steve Sidelnyk also performed and collaborated with the group. Like Weller's previous band, the London-based Style Council achieved most of its commercial success in the United Kingdom, where it scored seven top 10 hits. The group also charted with singles and albums in Australia and New Zealand during the 1980s.

== History ==
=== Formation and early singles (1982–1983) ===
The band was founded in Woking, Surrey in late 1982 by singer, guitarist and songwriter Paul Weller, following the break-up of his previous band the Jam. Preferring the idea of a loose, floating line-up, the band was initially a core duo of Weller and keyboardist Mick Talbot, who Weller said he chose because "he shares my hatred of the rock myth and the rock culture", augmented by various guest musicians and singers.

The band began their career releasing four consecutive non-album singles during 1983, showing a diversity of musical styles. "Speak Like a Child" was a soul-influenced pop song, "Money-Go-Round" was an extended funk track with political lyrics, "Long Hot Summer" was a synth-ballad, and "A Solid Bond in Your Heart" was influenced by Northern Soul. The latter had been recorded by the Jam the previous year as a possible last single, but had been passed over in favour of "Beat Surrender". All four singles made the Top 20 of the UK Singles Chart, reaching number 4, number 11, number 3, and number 11 respectively. Near the end of 1983, the first three singles and their B-sides were compiled on Introducing The Style Council, a mini-LP released in the US, Canada, Japan, and the Netherlands only. The Dutch version was heavily imported to the United Kingdom.

=== Café Bleu (1984) ===
In February 1984, the single "My Ever Changing Moods" became the band's third Top 10 hit on the UK Singles Chart, peaking at number 5. Released a month later, their debut studio album, Café Bleu, entered the UK Albums Chart at number 2. A different version of "My Ever Changing Moods" was included on the album, stripped down to a vocal and piano duet. Weller was the vocalist on several tracks, but the album also features guest vocalists and instrumentals, and mixes several genres, such as jazz, soul, pop, and funk; for these reasons, it divided critics and confused fans. Nevertheless, the album spent 36 weeks on the chart and was followed by two further Top 10 singles, a re-recorded version of album track "You're the Best Thing" in May and new song "Shout to the Top!" in October.

The album was complemented by a UK tour starting in March 1984 with supporting acts Billy Bragg and the Scottish pop band the Questions. These shows were dubbed "Council Meetings" and were followed by a brief European tour. Later the band played four dates in Japan, where they became hugely popular. These shows were captured on the video Far East and Far Out, released in September 1984. The band set out on their second "Council Meetings" UK tour in the autumn, this time with DJ Vaughn Toulouse. The shows were also intended to include a half-hour play directed by Tony Marchant instead of a support band, but the play was pulled in the last minute when one of the actors broke his leg. The UK dates were followed by dates in Italy where huge demands for tickets in Bologna forced a last-minute switch to a bigger venue.

In 1984, the band also undertook a brief tour of the United States. This led to the single "My Ever Changing Moods" (Note: The B-side comprised "Mick's Company", an instrumental from Café Bleu.) reaching number 29 on the US Billboard Hot 100. The song remains the group's and Weller's highest charting US single, including his period with the group the Jam and also as a solo artist. By the end of 1984, the Style Council were voted "best new band" in Billboard magazine.

In December 1984, "Soul Deep", a fund-raising single for striking miners, was released under the name "The Council Collective" (featuring Vaughn Toulouse, Dee C. Lee, Leonardo Chignoli of Animal Nightlife, Junior Giscombe and US Motown artist Jimmy Ruffin), reaching the Top 30 on the UK singles chart. The Style Council ended the year playing two nights at the Royal Albert Hall.

=== Our Favourite Shop (1985) ===
In the UK, the group reached the height of its popularity with the release of Our Favourite Shop, which entered the UK album chart at number 1 immediately following its release in June 1985 (only to be supplanted by Bryan Ferry's album Boys and Girls a week later). Mixing different styles such as Latin music, jazz and funk, and largely featuring political lyrics, it was widely considered to be the band's best work by contemporary critics. It notched up a total of 13 weeks in the UK Top 40 (including a re-entry in October), of which three weeks were spent in the Top 10. The preceding single "Walls Come Tumbling Down!" reached number 6 on the singles chart, while "Come to Milton Keynes" and "The Lodgers" reached number 23 and 13, respectively. A fourth single "Boy Who Cried Wolf" was released in the US and was a chart hit in New Zealand. Worldwide, it reached over one million sales. In 2015, Our Favourite Shop was included in a list of 50 albums released in 1985 which, according to the NME, "still sound great today". By this time, singer Dee C. Lee and drummer Steve White had effectively become core members alongside Weller and Talbot.

On 3 July 1985, the band played at the UK Live Aid concert, where they appeared second in the running order at Wembley Stadium between Status Quo and the Boomtown Rats. They played "You're the Best Thing" (from Café Bleu), "The Big Boss Groove" (the B-side of "You're the Best Thing"), "Internationalists" and "Walls Come Tumbling Down!" (both from Our Favourite Shop). The international exposure, however, did little to boost the group's career, and future commercial success was largely confined to their home country.

=== The Cost of Loving (1986–1987) ===
Following the live album Home and Abroad and video Showbiz, and the inclusion of the song "Have You Ever Had It Blue" on the soundtrack of the film Absolute Beginners in 1986, the band released their third studio album The Cost of Loving to mixed reviews in 1987. It reached number 2 on the UK Albums Chart. The first single from the album, "It Didn't Matter", reached number 9 on the singles chart.

The Cost of Loving saw the group concentrating on the R&B styles that had been growing in America during the eighties. Its urban contemporary feel was a jolt to listeners who had grown accustomed to the continental mix of soul music, jazz, and European folk styles that the band had displayed on their previous two studio albums. United States label Geffen Records heard the tracks and promptly dropped the Style Council from their roster. Socially conscious soul music pioneer Curtis Mayfield was asked to mix some of the material on the album, which displays hints of being influenced by house music and the Jimmy Jam and Terry Lewis sound. Tracks from the album were included in a poorly-received 37-minute film, Jerusalem, which the band showed at concerts during that year.

From this point, the band experienced a critical and commercial decline. "Waiting", the second single from The Cost of Loving, was the first of the band's singles that failed to reach the UK Top 40. The follow-up non-album single "Wanted" did better, reaching number 20, though it only spent a short time on the charts.

=== Confessions of a Pop Group and split (1988–1989) ===
In 1988, the ambitious Confessions of a Pop Group became the first of their albums that failed to reach the Top 10. It entered the albums chart at number 15 and dropped out of the chart a few weeks later. The singles "Life at a Top People's Health Farm" and "How She Threw It All Away" also only made brief chart appearances, peaking at number 28 and 41, respectively.

In 1989, Weller and Talbot went under the name of King Truman to release a single on Acid Jazz Records titled "Like a Gun". This was unknown to Polydor, and the single was pulled from the shops three days prior to release. Acid Jazz founder Eddie Piller said: "The pair offered to make a single for my new label, which I'd just started with [BBC] Radio 1 DJ Gilles Peterson as a side project. Talbot and Weller took pseudonyms Truman King and Elliott Arnold."

The compilation album The Singular Adventures of The Style Council was issued in 1989. Two new singles were released from the album, a cover version of "Promised Land" (originally by Joe Smooth) which reached number 27 on the UK Singles Chart in February, and a remake of "Long Hot Summer", titled "Long Hot Summer '89", which reached number 48 in May. "Promised Land" was intended as a preview of the band's next studio album, Modernism: A New Decade, which was strongly influenced by the new UK house music scene and due for release later that year. However, Polydor Records hated the album and refused to release it. The album would not be released until 1998, when it was included on the box set anthology The Complete Adventures of The Style Council, with a standalone version being released in 2001.

The Style Council's split was announced in August 1989. Regarding the break-up, Paul Weller said (in 1990):

It's something we should have done two or three years ago. We created some great music in our time, the effects of which won't be appreciated for some time.

In 1990, the band briefly reunited (without Lee) for a one-off performance on Japanese TV.

=== 2019 reunion ===
Weller, Talbot, Lee and White met for a recording session of "It's a Very Deep Sea" in August 2019. The session was featured in the 2020 Sky Arts documentary Long Hot Summers: The Story of the Style Council, and a career-spanning audio compilation of the same name was released.

== Politics ==
In December 1984, Weller put together an ensemble called the Council Collective to make a charity record, "Soul Deep", initially to raise money for striking miners during a long-running industrial dispute, and subsequently also for the family of David Wilkie, a taxi driver who was killed during the strike. The track featured the Style Council and a number of other performers, notably Jimmy Ruffin and Junior Giscombe. The song received airplay on BBC Radio 1 and was performed by the group on Top of the Pops, as well as (live) on Channel 4's The Tube.

In their lyrics, the Style Council took a more overtly political approach than the Jam, with tracks such as "Walls Come Tumbling Down!", "The Lodgers" and "Come to Milton Keynes" being deliberate attacks on middle England and the Thatcherite policies of the UK government during the 1980s. In 1985, Weller was persuaded by Billy Bragg to let the Style Council play a leading role in Red Wedge, a youth-orientated political campaign associated with the British Labour Party. His views at the time have since been described as those of a "traditional British socialist". In 1993 Weller admitted the experience had left him feeling "exploited" by the Labour Party, stating further that: "Before the Wedge, the Style Council had done a lot independently, raised a lot of money in benefits. But after the Wedge we were so disillusioned it all stopped. We were totally cynical about all of it." In a previous interview, whilst stating that there was still "a place for outspokenness" in popular music, Weller had said he was "first and foremost" a musician, stating: "In the '80s, in the Style Council, we were involved with a lot of political things going on at that time. I think after a while that overshadowed the music a bit."

== Discography ==
Studio albums

- Café Bleu (North America title: My Ever Changing Moods) (1984)
- Our Favourite Shop (North America title: Internationalists) (1985)
- The Cost of Loving (1987)
- Confessions of a Pop Group (1988)
- Modernism: A New Decade (1998)
