= Walls Come Tumbling Down! =

Single by the Style Council

from the album Our Favourite Shop
- B-side: "Spin Drifting"; "The Whole Point II"; "Blood Sports"
- Released: 1985
- Genre: Northern soul: British soul; new wave; pop
- Label: Polydor
- Songwriter: Paul Weller
- Producers: Peter Wilson and Paul Weller

The Style Council singles chronology
"Soul Deep" (1984)	"Walls Come Tumbling Down!" (1985)	"Come to Milton Keynes" (1985)

Music video
- "Walls Come Tumbling Down!" on YouTube

"Walls Come Tumbling Down!" is a song by the English pop band the Style Council which was their ninth single. It was written by their lead vocalist Paul Weller, and released in 1985 by Polydor Records. It is the first single from the band's second studio album, Our Favourite Shop (1985). Our Favourite Shop was renamed Internationalists for the US market.

The song "Blood Sports", which appeared on the single, is about anti-hunting and anti-animal blood sports. Its writing royalties went to the Bristol Defence Fund for two hunt saboteurs jailed for anti-blood sports activities, including attempted murder of a teenage rider and animal cruelty.

The music video was filmed in Warsaw, Poland.

== Critical reception ==
John Leland of Spin called the song, "a brassy take on the sort of '60s soul pop Elvis Costello mined on Get Happy!!, but Weller's reading suffers from its 'look at me' ebullience. Limp stuff."

== Compilation appearances ==
As well as the song's single release, it has featured on various compilation albums released by The Style Council. The song was included on The Singular Adventures of The Style Council (1989), The Complete Adventures of The Style Council (1998), and Greatest Hits (2000).

== Track listing ==
- 12" single (TSCX 8)
1. "Walls Come Tumbling Down!"
2. "Spin Drifting"
3. "The Whole Point II"
4. "Blood Sports"
- 7" single (TSCX 8)
1. "Walls Come Tumbling Down!" – 3:25
2. "The Whole Point II" – 2:50
3. "Blood Sports" – 3:25

== Charts ==
Chart (1985)	Peak position
Australian Singles Chart	19
Irish Singles Chart	6
New Zealand Singles Chart	15
UK Singles Chart	6

== Cover versions ==
Australian indie guitar pop band Screamfeeder covered the song on their 1999 studio album Home Age (The Hypnotized Label, HIP035), and reissued in 2004 on Introducing: Screamfeeder Singles & More 1992–2004 (Shock, SCREAM1CD).

Golden Earring frontman Barry Hay released a big band cover on The Big Band Theory, a 2008 collection of covers recorded with the Metropole Orkest (Blue Note, 50999 2364972 9).

== Externals links ==
- "Walls Come Tumbling Down!" at Discogs (list of releases)
