= Dee C. Lee =

English singer (born 1961)

- Born: Diane Catherine Sealy; 6 June 1961 (age 65); Balham, South London, UK
- Genres: Soul; R&B; pop
- Occupation: Singer
- Years active: 1981–present
- Labels: CBS; Cleartone; Pony Canyon; Acid Jazz
- Formerly of: The Style Council; Slam Slam; Central Line
- Spouse: Paul Weller (m. 1987; div. 1998)

Diane Catherine Sealy (born 6 June 1961), known as Dee C. Lee or Dee C Lee, is a British singer. Born to Saint Lucian parents, she grew up in south-west London. Early in her career, she was a member of the British band Central Line under the aliases Dee Sealy in 1981 and Dee C. Lee in 1983. She was a backing singer for Wham!, then released her first solo single, "Selina Wow Wow", in 1984. She started working with the Style Council in 1984, while continuing as a solo artist.

== Career ==
Lee was a member of the funk/soul group Central Line under the alias Dee Sealy in 1981 and her current stage name Dee C. Lee in 1983. She was a backing vocalist for the pop group Wham! in the early 1980s and appeared in their music videos for the songs "Wham Rap! (Enjoy What You Do)", "Young Guns (Go for It)" and "Club Tropicana".

Following her departure from Wham!, Lee released her first solo single, "Selina Wow Wow", in 1984.

In 1984, she worked with the Style Council and appeared on their debut studio album Café Bleu (released as My Ever Changing Moods in North America), having already worked with the Style Council in mid-1983 by providing vocals on the song "Money Go Round". Lee's vocals appear on the tracks "Headstart for Happiness", "It Didn't Matter", "The Lodgers", "Walls Come Tumbling Down", and "Shout to the Top". Lee continued to record solo material during this time, but singles "Yippee Yi Yay!" and "Don't Do It Baby" failed to chart.

In 1985, Lee was the featured artist on Masquerade's version of "Set It Off". In the same year, after the release of the second Style Council album Our Favourite Shop, and a stint working with the band Animal Nightlife, Lee released another solo single; the self-penned ballad "See the Day". The single became a hit and peaked at No. 3 in the UK chart in December 1985, selling a quarter of a million copies in the UK alone, and earning Lee a silver disc. Twenty years later, the song was covered by Girls Aloud, their version peaking at No. 9 on the UK Singles Chart in December 2005. Her follow-up singles, a cover of Judie Tzuke's "Come Hell or Waters High" and "Hold On" failed to make the UK Top 40. All tracks were featured on her 1986 album Shrine.

Throughout the rest of the 1980s, Lee continued to work with the Style Council on their albums The Cost of Loving (1987) and Confessions of a Pop Group (1988). She also worked with the band on their 1989 recording Modernism: A New Decade, but this album was rejected by the band's label, Polydor, and did not see a release until almost 10 years later, when it was included in the boxed set, The Complete Adventures of The Style Council.

Between 1989 and 1991, Lee teamed up with Robert Howard of the Blow Monkeys to form Slam Slam. They achieved a number of minor UK club successes including "Move (Dance All Night)" and "Free Your Feelings", the latter produced by Young Disciples. In 1993, Lee collaborated with Gang Starr frontman Guru on a single from his solo project Jazzmatazz called "No Time to Play" which also featured guitarist Ronny Jordan. It peaked at No. 25 in the UK in November 1993. Later in the 1990s, Lee released two further solo albums; Things Will Be Sweeter (1994) and Smiles (1998).

In 2006 Lee had a small role as a pop star in the film Rabbit Fever. In September 2007 she performed her hit "See the Day" on ITV1's Loose Women show. In September 2007, she also performed at a charity event in aid of combating domestic violence.

Lee also portrayed Preaching Nut-Nut in a 2008 short film, The Town That Boars Me, which tells the tale of a Pig Boy created by the lonely town butcher. The Pig Boy, now banished from the town, returns at nightfall to torment the local women and satisfy his insatiable fetish for high-heeled shoes. The film was released in London on 28 August 2008.

On 31 May 2009, Lee joined ex-Level 42 musicians, Mike Lindup and Phil Gould, to play a comeback gig with a collective called 'Favoured Nations' at Ginglik, Shepherd's Bush, London. In October of that year, she played a gig at Dingwalls in Camden Town. She continued to play one-off shows in London venues in 2010, and played in Chelsea in March 2011.

In January 2018, she posted a New Year's message on her website, expressing her sadness at the death of her former Wham! bandmate, George Michael, and reported she had been writing with keyboardist and composer Arden Hart and hoped to be recording new material and gigging.

== Personal life ==
Lee was married to fellow Style Council member Paul Weller from 1987 until they divorced in 1998. They have two children: Nathaniel and Leah.

== Discography ==
=== Albums ===
List of albums, with selected details and chart positions
Title	Details	Peak chart positions
Title	Details	AUS
Shrine	Released: 1986; Label: CBS	94
Free Your Feelings (credited as Slam Slam featuring Dee C. Lee)	Released: 1991; Label: MCA	—
Things Will Be Sweeter	Released: 1994; Label: Cleartone	—
Smiles	Released: 1998; Label: Pony Canyon	—
Just Something	Released: 2024; Label: Acid Jazz	—
"—" denotes a recording that did not chart or was not released in that territory.

=== Singles ===
List of singles, with selected chart positions and certifications, showing year released
Title	Year	Peak chart positions		Certifications
Title	Year	AUS	UK	Certifications
"Selina Wow Wow"	1984	—	88	
"Yippee Yi Yay!"	1984	—	—	
"Don't Do It Baby"	1984	—	—	
"See the Day"	1985	5	3	BPI: Silver
"Come Hell or Waters High"	1986	69	46	
"Hold On"	1986	—	—	
"Hey What'd Ya Say?"	1986	—	—	
"No Time to Play" (credited as Guru featuring Dee C. Lee and Ronny Jordan)	1993	—	25	
"New Reality Vibe"	1994	—	—	
"Searching" (credited as Nobukazu Takemura featuring Dee C. Lee)	1995	—	—	
"Don't Forget About Love" / "Be There in the Morning"	2023	—	—	
"—" denotes a recording that did not chart or was not released in that territory.
