= Simon Halfon =

British graphic designer

Simon Halfon is a graphic designer and film producer best known for his work with the Jam, the Style Council, and Paul Weller, beginning in 1983. He has also worked with Oasis, Nick Heyward, and George Michael, on his 1990 album Listen Without Prejudice Vol. 1.

In 2007, Halfon produced the feature film Sleuth, starring Michael Caine and Jude Law. The film was directed by Kenneth Branagh with a screenplay written by Harold Pinter.
