= Mick Talbot =

British keyboardist (born 1958)

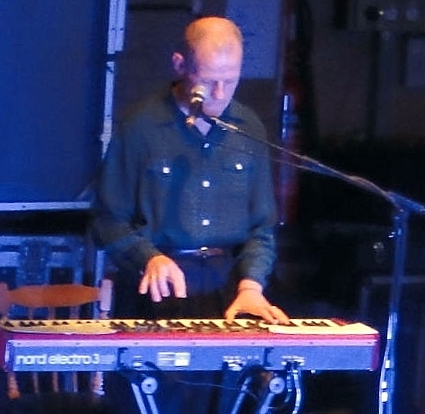
- Talbot performing in 2012

Background information
- Born: Michael Talbot; 11 September 1958 (age 68); Wimbledon, London, England
- Genres: Rock; pop
- Occupation: Musician
- Instrument: Keyboards
- Years active: 1970s–present
- Formerly of: The Merton Parkas; The Style Council; Dexys; The Bureau; Boogie Box High; Galliano; Stone Foundation

Michael Talbot (born 11 September 1958) is an English keyboardist. He was a co-founder of the Style Council with Paul Weller, and has also been a member of Dexys Midnight Runners, the Merton Parkas, the Bureau and Galliano.

== Career ==
=== The Style Council ===
In 1982, Talbot started working with Paul Weller to form the Style Council, who released their first records in early 1983. Since the break-up of the Style Council in March 1990, Talbot has continued to play with Weller on his solo material. He has also released albums with fellow former Style Council member Steve White, under the name Talbot/White.

Talbot plays alongside former Style Council bandmate White and former Ocean Colour Scene bass guitar player Damon Minchella, in the jazz/funk band the Players.

=== Other work and collaborations ===
Talbot played with late-1970s mod revivalists the Merton Parkas, Dexys Midnight Runners and the Bureau and can be seen in The Bureau's music video for their song "Only for Sheep".

Between 1995 and 1996, Talbot and Steve White released two instrumental albums, United States of Mind and Off the Beaten Track, with bass player Yolanda Charles and guest musicians (including Paul Weller).

Talbot was a member of Dexys (formerly Dexys Midnight Runners) in 1980 and from 2003 to 2013. Talbot played keyboards in Galliano, and on the 1991 Young Disciples album Road to Freedom. Talbot toured the UK in 2009 with Candi Staton. Between 1999 and 2001, Talbot was a touring member of Gene during their promotion of the album Revelations. He then returned for their reunion gigs in 2025 and 2026.

In 2014, Talbot worked with Wilko Johnson and Roger Daltrey on the collaborative studio album Going Back Home. He also worked with Daltrey and Pete Townshend on their 2014 single release "Be Lucky". and on Pete Williams' album Roughnecks Roustabouts (Basehart Recordings), released in March 2015.

== Bibliography ==
- Munn, Iain (2006). Mr Cool's Dream. The Complete History of the Style Council. Wholepoint Publications. ISBN 0-9551443-0-2.
