= James Hurr =

- Born: England
- Genres: Tech house, house, UK garage
- Occupations: Record producer, DJ
- Instruments: Keyboards, turntables
- Years active: 2010-present
- Label: Toolroom Records
- Website: jameshurr.com

James Hurr is a British DJ , music producer and sound engineer.

== Biography ==
He has worked with artists like Mark Knight, Michael Gray, Paul Harris, Tiesto, Leftwing:Kody, Armin van Buuren, Bob Sinclar and Vintage Culture. He has over 100 million streams on Spotify and has been ranked at number 18 of the top 101 producers by 1001Tracklists.com.

He released most of his tracks on Toolroom Records, but he also did it on Defected, Armada and Spinnin' Records. Throughout is career, he has worked on productions and remixes for artists such as Kylie Minogue, Robbie Williams and Nile Rodgers. One of his most famous songs is "Hit 'Em Up Style (Oops!)!", which he made with ESSEL. Since 2013, he is one half of the English house duo Moto Blanco.

== Discography ==
=== Singles ===
- 2021 James Hurr, Lizzie Curious - The Revival (Extended Mix)
- 2021 Mark Knight, James Hurr & Laura Davie - Movin (Extended Mix)
- 2022 James Hurr - Right Now
- 2022 James Hurr - Tell Me (Extended Mix)
- 2022 James Hurr - Di Da Di (Extended Mix)
- 2022 ESSEL, James Hurr - Hit 'Em Up Style (Oops!)
- 2022 James Hurr, Tasty Lopez - Til We Break It Down
- 2022 Mark Knight & James Hurr (feat. Cari Golden) - You Are A God (Extended Mix)
- 2022 James Hurr, Per QX & Elias Bravo - Get Up (Extended Mix)
- 2023 Mark Knight, James Hurr - Lady (Hear Me Tonight)
- 2023 Mark Knight, Green Velvet, James Hurr - The Greatest Thing Alive
- 2023 Mark Knight, Todd Terry, James Hurr (ft. Darryl James, David Anthony) - Make You Happy
- 2024 Wh0, Mark Knight, James Hurr (feat. Kathy Brown) - Turn Me Deeper
- 2024 Milk & Sugar, James Hurr - I Love Music
- 2024 Mark Knight, Darius Syrossian, James Hurr - I Got All This Love
- 2024 Mark Knight, James Hurr - You Take Me Higher
- 2025 Smokin Jo, James Hurr - Feel Real Good
- 2025 James Hurr - You Get Down
- 2025 Mark Knight, James Hurr - I Don't Wanna Come Down
- 2025 James Hurr, Jewel Kid (feat. Frankco Harris) - Back Of The Jeep
- 2025 Roland Clark, Mark Knight, James Hurr - Get Deep
- 2026 James Hurr, Jay Rah - Pinta La Cara (Extended Mix)

=== Remixes ===
- 2017 Robbie Williams - Love My Life (Adam Turner & James Hurr Remix)
- 2018 Bang Bang Romeo - Bag of Bones (James Hurr Remix)
- 2019 Rare Candy & Angie Brown - Make My Love (James Hurr Remix)
- 2024 Milk & Sugar feat. Maria Marquez - Canto del Pilon (James Hurr Remix)
- 2025 Jules Liesl - Cherry (James Hurr x Karsten Sollors Remix)
- 2025 Joe Smooth - Promised Land (Mark Knight & James Hurr Extended Remix)
