= Cosmic Gate =

German DJ duo

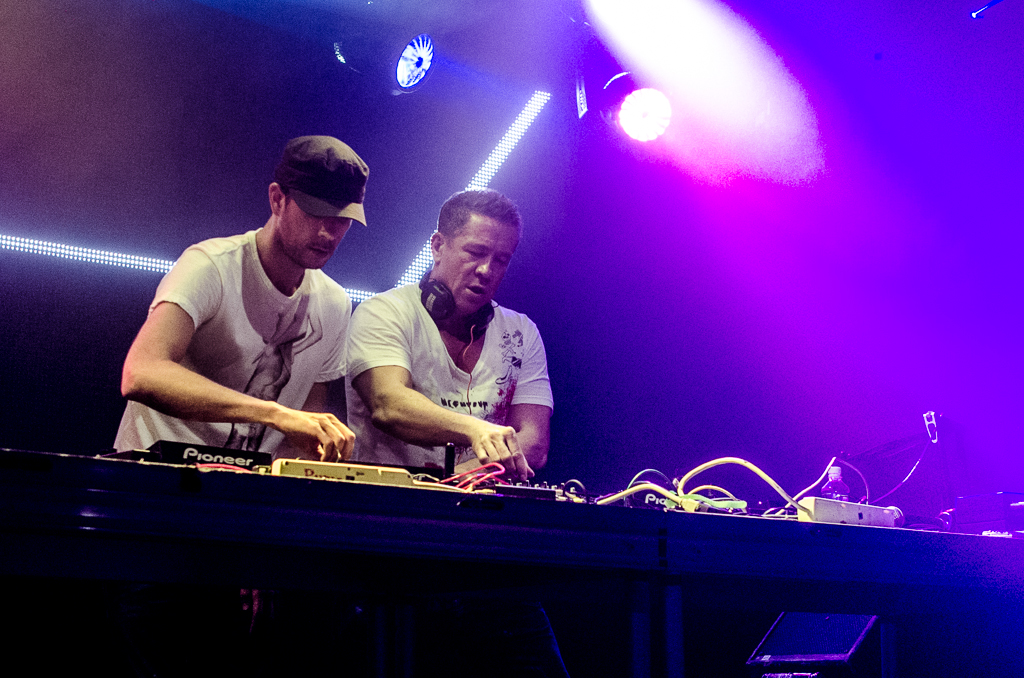
- Cosmic Gate at the Republik in Honolulu, 2013

Background information
- Origin: Krefeld, Germany
- Genres: Trance; Hard Trance; progressive trance
- Occupations: DJs; record producers
- Years active: 1999–present
- Labels: Electrola; Black Hole Recordings; Armada Music; Wake Your Mind
- Members: Claus Terhoeven (Nic Chagall)
- Past members: Stefan Bossems (DJ Bossi)
- Website: www.cosmic-gate.de

Cosmic Gate is a German DJ artist consisting of trance music producer Claus Terhoeven (born 1972) and formerly Stefan Bossems (born 1967). Both hail from Krefeld, Germany.

On October 28, 2009, DJ Magazine announced the results of their annual Top 100 DJ Poll, with Ultra Records artist Cosmic Gate placed #19, 43 spots above the group's ranking the year before. For the 2010 DJ Magazine Top 100 DJ Poll, Cosmic Gate moved to #24.

== Career ==
Cosmic Gate was formed in 1999 when Terhoeven (also known as Nic Chagall) and Bossems (also known as Bossi) decided to assemble a new project in the electronic music field.

Their first single was "The Drums", followed by "Exploration of Space", "Mental Atmosphere" and their "Somewhere over the Rainbow" remix using samples from the film The Wizard of Oz. However, Cosmic Gate did not become well known until their single "Fire Wire" was released in the UK in 2001.

Cosmic Gate made many remixes for artists such as Tiësto ("Urban Train"), Ferry Corsten ("Punk"), Blank & Jones ("DFF"), Israel Kamakawiwo'ole ("Somewhere Over the Rainbow"), Svenson & Gielen ("Answer the Question") and Vanessa-Mae ("White Bird").

In 2013 they released "So Get Up" featuring Ithaka as the first single on their new label Wake Your Mind Records, distrubuted by Armada Music.

Over the past few years, Cosmic Gate's sound has developed and moved away from the harder edge trance through to their current, more subtle yet still driving energetic music style. Since their third studio album, Earth Mover, they started moving towards the Progressive Trance style. They have also led a trance podcast called Wake Your Mind Radio since 2014.

In 2015, they collaborated with Armin van Buuren on the trance track "Embargo", which was featured on Van Buuren's studio album "Embrace". Two years later, they announced their seventh studio album titled "Materia", which was released on January 20, 2017.

In 2018, Claus was nominated for a Grammy Award For Best Remixed Recording for their remix of Gabriel & Dresden feat. Sub Teal "Only Road" on the Anjunabeats Label. They were the first ever trance artist to be nominated in this category.

On 22 February 2026, the duo announced that Stefan was to retire from touring and would leave the group. Claus would continue under the name Cosmic Gate, including new music and live shows

=== Touring ===
The pair have played over 1,000 gigs, typically performing between 100 and 130 nights a year. They have played at clubs such as Ministry of Sound, The Guvernment, and Privilege Ibiza. They have played alongside DJs such as Armin Van Buuren, Ferry Corsten, W&W and Hardwell.

== Discography ==
=== Albums ===
==== Studio albums ====
- Rhythm & Drums (2001)
- No More Sleep (2002)
- Earth Mover (2006)
- Sign of the Times (2009)
- Wake Your Mind (2011)
- Start to Feel (2014)
- Materia Chapter.One (2017)
- Materia Chapter.Two (2017)
- 20 Years [Forward Ever Backward Never] (2019)
- Mosaiik Chapter One (2021)
- Mosaiik Chapter Two (2023)

==== Compilation albums ====
- Back 2 the Future – The Classics from 1999–2003: Remixed (2011)

==== DJ mixes ====
- MaxiMal in the Mix Vol. 5 (with Tillmann Uhrmacher) (2001)
- Technics DJ Set Volume Three (with DJ Shog) (2001)
- Techno Club Vol. 14 – Talla 2XLC Welcomes Cosmic Gate (2001)
- 3AM Rush (2002)
- Bitte Ein Beat! – Beat 3 (2002)
- Back 2 Back – In the Mix (2003)
- Back 2 Back Vol. 2 (2005)
- Hard NRG 7 (2005)
- Back 2 Back 3 (2007)
- Privilege – World Biggest Club: Ibiza (with Hardwell) (2009)
- Back 2 Back 4 (2010)
- A State of Trance 500 (2011)
- Trance Nation (2012)
- Wake Your Mind Sessions 001 (2015)
- Wake Your Mind Sessions 002 (2016)
- Wake Your Mind Sessions 003 (2018)
- Trance Energy 2018 (2018)
- Wake Your Mind Sessions 004 (2020)

=== Singles ===
Year	Single	Peak chart positions							Album
Year	Single	AUT	DEN	FIN	GER	NED	SWI	UK	Album
1999	"The Drums"	—	—	—	40	—	—	—	Rhythm & Drums
1999	"Mental Atmosphere"	—	—	—	58	—	—	—	Rhythm & Drums
2000	"Somewhere Over the Rainbow"	—	—	—	29	—	82	—	Rhythm & Drums
2001	"Exploration of Space"	34	—	—	12	—	52	29	Rhythm & Drums
2001	"Fire Wire"	—	—	—	—	—	—	9	Rhythm & Drums
2002	"Back to Earth"	44	13	—	25	—	—	—	No More Sleep
2002	"The Truth"	57	—	—	31	—	90	—	No More Sleep
2002	"The Wave"	—	—	13	54	—	—	48	No More Sleep
2003	"Human Beings"	—	—	—	—	—	—	—	No More Sleep
2005	"I Feel Wonderful" (featuring Jan Johnston)	—	—	—	—	—	—	122	Earth Mover
2006	"Should've Known"	—	—	—	—	75	—	—	Earth Mover
2007	"Analog Feel"	—	—	—	—	—	—	—	Earth Mover
2007	"Consciousness" (featuring Denise Rivera)	—	—	—	—	—	—	—	Earth Mover
2007	"Body of Conflict" (featuring Denise Rivera)	—	—	—	—	79	—	—	Sign of the Times
2008	"A Day That Fades" (featuring Roxanne Emery)	—	—	—	—	—	—	—	Earth Mover
2009	"Not Enough Time" (featuring Emma Hewitt)	—	—	—	—	—	—	—	Sign of the Times
2009	"Sign of the Times"	—	—	—	—	—	—	—	Sign of the Times
2009	"Flatline" (featuring Kyler England)	—	—	—	—	—	—	—	Sign of the Times
2009	"Under Your Spell" (featuring Aruna)	—	—	—	—	—	—	—	Sign of the Times
2010	"Barra"	—	—	—	—	—	—	—	Wake Your Mind
2011	"Be Your Sound" (featuring Emma Hewitt)	—	—	—	—	—	—	—	Wake Your Mind
2012	"Perfect Stranger"	—	—	—	—	—	—	—	Wake Your Mind
2012	"Wake Your Mind" (with Cary Brothers)	—	—	—	—	—	—	—	Wake Your Mind
2012	"Calm Down" (featuring Emma Hewitt)	—	—	—	—	—	—	—	Wake Your Mind
2013	"Storm Chaser"	—	—	—	—	—	—	—	Non-album single
2013	"Crushed"	—	—	—	—	—	—	—	Start to Feel
2013	"So Get Up"	—	—	—	—	—	—	—	Start to Feel
2014	"Falling Back" (with Eric Lumiere)	—	—	—	—	—	—	—	Start to Feel
2014	"Fair Game" (with Ørjan Nilsen)	—	—	—	—	—	—	—	Start to Feel
2014	"Telefunken" (with Jerome Isma-Ae)	—	—	—	—	—	—	—	Start to Feel
2014	"Alone" (with Kristina Antuna)	—	—	—	—	—	—	—	Start to Feel
2015	"Yai (Here We Go Again)" (with JES)	—	—	—	—	—	—	—	Wake Your Mind; Sessions 001
2015	"Going Home" (with Emma Hewitt)	—	—	—	—	—	—	—	Start to Feel
2016	"am2pm"	—	—	—	—	—	—	—	Materia Chapter.One
2016	"Edge of Life" (with Eric Lumiere)	—	—	—	—	—	—	—	Materia Chapter.One
2016	"Event Horizon" (with Ferry Corsten)	—	—	—	—	—	—	—	Non-album single
2016	"Fall Into You" (with JES)	—	—	—	—	—	—	—	Materia Chapter.One
2017	"Dynamic" (with Ferry Corsten)	—	—	—	—	—	—	—	Materia Chapter.One
2017	"The Deep End" (with Tim White)	—	—	—	—	—	—	—	Materia Chapter.One
2017	"Tonight" (with Emma Hewitt)	—	—	—	—	—	—	—	Materia Chapter.Two
2017	"AR" (with Markus Schulz)	—	—	—	—	—	—	—	Materia Chapter.Two
2017	"Bigger Than We Are" (with Eric Lumiere)	—	—	—	—	—	—	—	Materia Chapter.Two
2017	"Folded Wings" (with Sarah Lynn)	—	—	—	—	—	—	—	Materia Chapter.Two
2018	"Yeah!"	—	—	—	—	—	—	—	Non-album singles
2018	"Awaken" (with Jason Ross)	—	—	—	—	—	—	—	Non-album singles
2019	"Need to Feel Loved" (with Foret)	—	—	—	—	—	—	—	Non-album singles
2019	"Come With Me"	—	—	—	—	—	—	—	20 Years
2019	"Light Years"	—	—	—	—	—	—	—	20 Years
2019	"The Wave 2.0"	—	—	—	—	—	—	—	20 Years
2020	"Your Mind"	—	—	—	—	—	—	—	Non-album singles
2020	"Universal Love"	—	—	—	—	—	—	—	Non-album singles
2020	"The Launch" (with Andrew Bayer)	—	—	—	—	—	—	—	Anjunabeats Volume 15
2021	"Blame" (with Diana Miro)	—	—	—	—	—	—	—	Mosaiik
2021	"Feel It"	—	—	—	—	—	—	—	Mosaiik
2021	"Nothing to Hide" (with Diana Miro)	—	—	—	—	—	—	—	Mosaiik
2021	"Vertigo"	—	—	—	—	—	—	—	Non-album singles
2021	"Summer Wonder" (with Mike Schmid)	—	—	—	—	—	—	—	Non-album singles
2022	"Retrospection" (with Greenhaven DJs)	—	—	—	—	—	—	—	Non-album singles
"—" denotes a recording that did not chart or was not released.

==== Other songs ====
2016: Armin van Buuren & Cosmic Gate – "Embargo"

== Remixes ==
- Sash! – Adelante (Cosmic Gate Remix) 1999
- U96 – Das Boot 2001 (Cosmic Gate Remix) 1999
- Green Court – Follow Me (Cosmic Gate Remix) 1999
- Green Court – Follow Me (Cosmic Gate Edit) 1999
- Miss Shiva – Dreams (Cosmic Gate Remix) 1999
- Beam vs. Cyrus and The Joker – Launch In Progress (Cosmic Gate Remix) 1999
- Bossi – To The Sky (Cosmic Gate Remix) 1999
- Taucher – Science Fiction (Cosmic Gate Remix) 2000
- Der Verfall – Der Mussolini (Cosmic Gate Remix) 2000
- E Nomine – E Nomine (Cosmic Gate Remix) 2000
- Aquagen – Lovemachine (Cosmic Gate Remix) 2000
- Balloon – Monstersound (Cosmic Gate Mix) 2000
- Beam and Yanou – Sound Of Love (Cosmic Gate Remix) 2000
- Talla 2XLC – World In My Eyes (Cosmic Gate Remix) 2001
- Blank & Jones – DJs, Fans & Freaks (Cosmic Gate Remix) 2001
- Safri Duo – Samb-Adagio (Cosmic Gate Remix) 2001
- Vanessa-Mae – White Bird (Cosmic Gate Remix) 2001
- Green Court – Inside Your Gates (Cosmic Gate Remix) 2001
- Tiësto – Urban Train (Cosmic Gate Remix) 2001
- Ferry Corsten – Punk (Cosmic Gate Remix) 2002
- Rank 1 – Awakening (Cosmic Gate Remix) 2002
- 4 Strings – Diving (Cosmic Gate Remix) 2002
- DuMonde – God Music (Cosmic Gate Remix) 2002
- Sioux – Pho (Cosmic Gate Remix) 2002
- Svenson & Gielen – Answer the Question (Cosmic Gate Remix) 2002
- Age of Love – The Age of Love (Cosmic Gate Remix) 2004
- Beam – Amun (Cosmic Gate Mix) 2004
- C.Y.B – Now (Cosmic Gate Remix) 2005
- 64 Bit – Virtual Discotech 1.0 (Cosmic Gate Remix) 2005
- Cosmic Gate – Race Car Driver (Back 2 Back Mix) 2005
- Cosmic Gate – The Drums (Back 2 Back Mix) 2005
- Armin van Buuren and Rank 1 – This World Is Watching Me (Cosmic Gate Remix) 2007
- Kirsty Hawkshaw Meets Tenishia – Outsiders (Cosmic Gate Remix) 2007
- Tiësto featuring JES – Everything (Cosmic Gate Remix) 2007
- Cosmic Gate – Body Conflict (Cosmic Gate Club Mix) 2007
- Vincent De Moor – Fly Away (Cosmic Gate Remix) 2007
- Messler – Prepare (Cosmic Gate B2B3 Edit) 2007
- Cosmic Gate – Fire Wire (Cosmic Gate B2B3 Reconstruction) 2007
- Veracocha – Carte Blanche (Cosmic Gate Remix) 2008
- OceanLab – Sirens of the Sea (Cosmic Gate Remix) 2008
- Deadmau5 – Clockwork (Cosmic Gate Remix) 2008
- Armin van Buuren featuring Cathy Burton – Rain (Cosmic Gate Remix) 2009
- John O'Callaghan featuring Sarah Howells – Find Yourself (Cosmic Gate Remix) 2009
- Fabio XB and Ronnie Play featuring Gabriel Cage – Inside Of You (Cosmic Gate Remix) 2009
- Paul van Dyk featuring John McDaid – Home (Cosmic Gate Remix) 2009
- Markus Schulz presents Dakota – Sin City (Cosmic Gate Remix) 2009
- Kyau & Albert – I Love You (Cosmic Gate Remix) 2009
- JES – Lovesong (Cosmic Gate Remix) 2009
- Cosmic Gate – London Rain (Back 2 Back 4 ReDub)
- James Horner and Leona Lewis – I See You [ Avatar Main Theme ] (Cosmic Gate Remix) 2010
- Andrew Bennett featuring Sir Adrian – Run Till U Shine (Cosmic Gate Remix) 2010
- Cosmic Gate – Exploration of Space (Cosmic Gate's Back 2 The Future Remix) 2010
- Cosmic Gate – Fire Wire (Cosmic Gate's Back 2 The Future Remix) 2010
- Markus Schulz – Away (Cosmic Gate Remix) 2011
- Robbie Rivera – Departures (Cosmic Gate Remix) 2011
- Ferry Corsten – Punk (Cosmic Gate Essential Rework) 2011
- Emma Hewitt – Colours (Cosmic Gate Remix) 2012
- Rank 1 and Jochen Miller featuring Sarah Bettens – Wild and Perfect Day (Cosmic Gate Remix) 2012
- Manufactured Superstars – Calling All The Lovers (Cosmic Gate Remix) 2012
- Late Night Alumni – Sapphire (Cosmic Gate Remix) 2012
- Veracocha – Carte Blanche (Cosmic Gate Remix) 2013
- Armin van Buuren – Pulsar (Cosmic Gate Remix) 2013
- Gareth Emery – Long Way Home (Cosmic Gate Remix) 2015
- Cosmic Gate – Exploration of Space (Cosmic Gate's Third Contact Remix) 2016
- Gabriel & Dresden featuring Sub Teal – Only Road (Cosmic Gate Remix) 2018
- Gareth Emery featuring Evan Henzi – Call To Arms (Cosmic Gate Remix) 2018
- Ilan Bluestone – Frozen Ground (Cosmic Gate Remix) 2018
- Mauro Picotto – Lizard (Cosmic Gate Remix) 2019
- Rank 1 – L.E.D. There Be Light (Cosmic Gate Remix) 2019
- Armin van Buuren and Avian Grays featuring Jordan Shaw – Something Real (Cosmic Gate Remix) (2020)
- Joe Smooth – Promised Land (Cosmic Gate's No Gravity Remix) (2020)
- Andrew Rayel and Olivia Sebastianelli – Everything Everything (Cosmic Gate Remix) (2020)

== Awards and nominations ==
2018 Grammy nomination 'Best Remixed Recording, Non-classical' for 'Only Road' by Gabriel & Dresden.

=== DJ Magazine ===
==== Top 100 DJs Ranking ====
Year	Rank	Movement
2003	86	—
2004	81	Up 5
2005	90	Down 9
2006	—	—
2007	—	—
2008	62	—
2009	19	Up 43
2010	24	Down 5
2011	43	Down 19
2012	39	Up 4
2013	80	Down 41
2014	69	Up 11
2015	99	Down 30
2016	—	—
