= Strings of Life =

1987 song by Derrick May

Single by Rhythim Is Rhythim
- Released: 1987
- Genre: Detroit techno; techno; house
- Length: 7:23 (Piano Mix)
- Label: Transmat
- Songwriters: Derrick May; Michael James
- Producers: Mayday; Mike Slade

Rhythim Is Rhythim singles chronology
"Nude Photo" (1987)	"Strings of Life" (1987)	"It Is What It Is" (1988)

Music video
- "Strings of Life" on YouTube

"Strings of Life" is a 1987 song by American electronic musician Derrick May, in collaboration with Michael James, and released under the name Rhythim Is Rhythim. It is his most well-known song and considered a classic in both the house music and techno genres. May is credited with developing the futuristic variation that would be dubbed "techno". LA Weekly ranked it number-one in its list of "The 20 Best Dance Music Tracks in History" in 2015.

== Background and release ==
Born in Detroit, May began exploring electronic music at early age. His high school friends were Juan Atkins and Kevin Saunderson. They were commonly known as the Belleville Three.

In 1987, May started his production career with the release of "Nude Photo", a single co-written by Thomas Barnett. The single helped kickstart the Detroit techno music scene. A year later he followed it with the release of "Strings of Life," which was named by Frankie Knuckles after May gave him a demo tape. It "hit Britain in an especially big way during the country's 1987–1988 house explosion."

"Strings of Life" is based on a piano sequence by May's friend Michael James. He dropped in for a visit at May's house and sat down to play a piano ballad he had been working on called, "Lightning Strikes Twice". This piece went into May's sequencer and was kept there until May decided to listen to it all the way through. He found some portions which interested him, and he started to work with it. The song was originally at 80 BPM before May increased the tempo, chopped it up into loops, and added percussion and string samples.

According to May, the track "just exploded. It was like something you can't imagine, the kind of power and energy people got off that record when it was first heard. Mike Dunn says he has no idea how people can accept a record that doesn't have a bassline."

In 1989, the song was remixed by Juan Atkins and released as "Strings of Life '89". It peaked at number 74 in the United Kingdom.

"I remember playing this when it first came out in 1986/87 – long before the summer of love explosion in '88. I played it at Pyramid at Heaven and was probably the first person to play this in England. The crowd went crazy. A couple of days later I played at a straight club and it cleared the floor."

— Mark Moore talking to Music Week about the song.

== Impact and legacy ==
Through the years, many DJs have named "Strings of Life" one of their favourite songs. American DJ Pierre said to Music Week "This is the ultimate strings song. The arrangement is brilliant and has a piano string breakdown which established the breakdown that many people use today. It was one of the first songs to put percussion to the forefront." American DJ Carl Craig commented, "I got this when it came out in 1988. It's a great party record. Spiritually, I don't know whether it would have anything for me at home but, when I hear it at a club, I trip out." English house music DJ, DJ Paulette told, "I love this because of the moment when the piano comes in — it's like watching the sun rising. I play both mixes, but for playing clubs I like this one [the Ashley Beedle Mix] because of the beat."

"This is special because it's a seminal dance track. It reminds me of when I first DJed at Sunrise. Another DJ was doing the last set and it wasn't going down too well, people were getting agitated and throwing things at him; he refused to play and I went back on and this was the first track — it got the best response I've ever had as a DJ. I play it when I do Back To '89 and if I'm in the mood I'll play it at Speed — you have to create a vibe and it takes everyone by surprise.

— Fabio talking to Music Week about the song.

In 1996, clubbing magazine Mixmag ranked the song number 17 in their list of "100 Greatest Dance Singles of All Time". In 1997, American songwriter, record producer, DJ and singer Robert Owens featured "Strings of Life" in his all-time top 10 list. He explained, "Derrick May takes me back to the Music Box days and the type of people that went ouf during that period. It's good to remember your roots and nice to pull something out to remind you. This is an all-time classic. I play it anywhere. The remixes came out and kinda killed it, so l put it away for six months. But it will always resurface." In 1998, DJ Magazine ranked the song number 25 on its list of "Top 100 Club Tunes".

BBC Radio's 2008 listeners & DJs poll, "The Greatest Ever Dance Record", ranked "Strings of Life" number four, after Michael Jackson's "Billie Jean", James Brown's "Sex Machine" and Donna Summer's "I Feel Love". In 2011, The Guardian featured the song on its "A History of Modern Music: Dance". In 2013, Mixmag ranked it number 28 on their "50 Greatest Dance Tracks of All Time". In 2014, Complex included it on its list of "Songs Every Dance Music Fan Should Know, Vol. 1", noting, "It's amazing that a record that encapsulates piano and orchestral samples but has no bassline (or need for one) can still resonate today." In 2015, LA Weekly ranked it number one on its "The 20 Best EDM and Dance Music Tracks in History", while Time Out's 2015 list of "The 20 Best House Tracks Ever" included it at number 12. In 2022, Rolling Stone ranked "Strings of Life" number 33 in its list of "200 Greatest Dance Songs of All Time". In 2025, Billboard magazine ranked it number 49 in their "The 100 Best Dance Songs of All Time".

== Track listings ==
- 12-inch single, US (1987)
1. "Strings" (Flam-Boy-Ant Mix) – 6:54
2. "Strings of Life" – 7:23
3. "Move It" (Remix) – 5:42
4. "Kaos" (Juice Bar Mix) – 5:50
5. "Untitled" – 3:08
- 12-inch single ('89 Remix), UK (1989)
1. "Strings of Life '89" (Juan's Magic Mix)
2. "Strings of Life" (Original Version)
3. "Nude Photo"

== Charts ==
Chart (1989)	Peak position
UK Singles (Official Charts)	74

== Soul Central version ==
"Strings of Life (Stronger on My Own)"
- UK 12-inch cover artwork

Single by Soul Central featuring Kathy Brown
- Released: January 10, 2005
- Genre: House
- Length: 8:40 (full vocal); 3:40 (radio edit)
- Label: Defected
- Songwriters: Paul Timothy; Derrick May; Jaquie Williams; Michael James
- Producer: Paul Timothy

Soul Central singles chronology
"Strings of Life (Stronger on My Own)" (2005)	"Need You Now" (2006)

Music video
- "Strings of Life (Stronger on My Own)" on YouTube

British house music duo Soul Central covered the song and released it in January 2005 with the subtitle "Stronger on My Own". Vocals were written for this version by Paul Timothy and Jaquie Williams, and they were performed by American house singer Kathy Brown. The cover reached number six on the UK Singles Chart the week after its release and became a club hit, peaking atop the UK Dance Singles Chart. It additionally reached the top 50 in Australia, Flanders, Ireland, and the Netherlands.

=== Track listings ===
- UK and Australian CD single
1. "Strings of Life (Stronger on My Own)" (radio edit) – 3:38
2. "Strings of Life (Stronger on My Own)" (full length vocal) – 8:38
3. "Strings of Life" (Danny Krivit re-edit) – 8:42
4. "Strings of Life" (Martijn ten Velden & Mark Knight Toolroom mix) – 10:11
5. "Strings of Life" (Funky Lowlives mix) – 5:51
- UK 12-inch single

A1. "Strings of Life (Stronger on My Own)" (full length vocal)
AA1. "Strings of Life" (Danny Krivit re-edit)
AA2. "Strings of Life" (Funky Lowlives mix)

- German maxi-CD single
1. "Strings of Life (Stronger on My Own)" (radio edit) – 3:40
2. "Strings of Life (Stronger on My Own)" (full length vocal) – 8:39
3. "Strings of Life (Stronger on My Own)" (Martijn ten Velden & Mark Knight Toolroom mix) – 10:12
4. "Strings of Life (Stronger on My Own)" (Michi Lange Plastix mix) – 8:00
5. "Strings of Life (Stronger on My Own)" (Danny Krivit re-edit) – 8:43
6. "Strings of Life (Stronger on My Own)" (the video) – 3:38
- US digital download EP
1. "Strings of Life (Stronger on My Own)" (radio edit) – 3:37
2. "Strings of Life (Stronger on My Own)" (full length vocal) – 8:37
3. "Strings of Life (Stronger on My Own)" (Danny Krivit re-edit) – 8:40
4. "Strings of Life (Stronger on My Own)" (Martijn ten Velden & Mark Knight Toolroom mix) – 10:09
5. "Strings of Life (Stronger on My Own)" (Funky Lowlives mix) – 5:49
6. "Strings of Life (Stronger on My Own)" (Danism remix "Liquid People re-edit") – 6:43
7. "Strings of Life (Stronger on My Own)" (Copyright dub edit) – 5:38

=== Charts ===
==== Weekly charts ====
Chart (2005)	Peak position
Australia (ARIA)	49
Australian Club Chart (ARIA)	4
Australian Dance (ARIA)	8
Belgium (Ultratop 50 Flanders)	24
Belgium (Ultratip Bubbling Under Wallonia)	4
Hungary (Dance Top 40)	31
Ireland (IRMA)	39
Netherlands (Dutch Top 40)	39
Netherlands (Single Top 100)	43
Scottish Singles Sales (Official Charts)	10
UK Singles (Official Charts)	6
UK Dance (Official Charts)	1

==== Year-end charts ====
Chart (2005)	Position
Australian Club Chart (ARIA)	28

== Other covers ==
British electronic artist Kieran Hebden and American jazz drummer Steve Reid covered the song during their improvisational performances in the late 2000s, a live version being released after Reid's passing to raise funds for a foundation started in his name.
