= Falling Back =

Falling Back can refer to:

- "Falling Back" (song), a song by Drake from the album Honestly, Nevermind, 2022
- "Falling Back", a song by Jackie Greene from Rusty Nails, 2003
- "Falling Back", a song by Marianne Faithful and Anna Calvi from Give My Love to London, 2014
- "Falling Back", a song by Cosmic Gate Start to Feel, 2014
- "Falling Back", a song by Oliver from Full Circle, 2017
- "Falling Back", a song by Roosevelt, 2019
