= Firewire (disambiguation) =

FireWire is Apple's trademark for the IEEE 1394 interface.

Firewire or Fire wire may also refer to:

- Firewire (Lateef the Truthspeaker album), 2011
- Fire Wire (Larry Carlton album), 2006
- "Fire Wire" (song), a 2001 single by Cosmic Gate
- Graviner Firewire, a linear fire detection element used in aircraft engine bays; see Graviner § Fire detection
