= Back 2 Back 3 =

Remix album by Various artists
- Released: October 29, 2007
- Genre: Trance
- Label: Black Hole Recordings

Back 2 Back chronology
Back 2 Back Vol. 2 (2005)	Back 2 Back 3 (2007)

Back 2 Back 3 is a 2-disc DJ mix by German trance duo Cosmic Gate from the series Back 2 Back. Released October 29, 2007, each disc in the volume contained mixed songs by the likes of Markus Schulz, Tiësto and other DJs. It was released on Black Hole Recordings.

== Track listing ==
=== Disc 1 ===
1. Cosmic Gate - B2B3 Intro
2. Adam K & Soha - Twilight
3. Marcel Woods - New Feeling (Nic Chagall Remix/Cosmic Gate's B2B3 Dub)
4. Patric La Funk - Unisono
5. Above & Beyond - Home (Wippenberg Remix)
6. Nic Chagall - Back To San Fran
7. Moonbeam - Cocoon (Moon Mix)
8. Ricky Stone & Lou Swimmin - Pure (Dub Mix)
9. Andrew Bennett Feat. Kirsty Hawkshaw - Heaven Sent (Andrew Bennett & Tom Cloud Vocal Mix)
10. Johan Gielen - Okinawa Sunset (Andy Duguid Remix)
11. Marcus Schössow - Mr. White (Ruben De Ronde Remix)
12. D. Ramirez & Mark Knight - Colombian Soul (Gabriel & Dresden Tuscan Soul Reconstruction)
13. First State Feat. Anita Kelsey - Falling
14. Wippenberg Pres. Sphæra - Back
15. Plastic Angel - Try Walking In My World
16. Cosmic Gate - A Day That Fades (Cosmic Gate's From AM To PM Mix/B2B3 Edit)

=== Disc 2 ===
1. Tiësto Feat. Jes- Everything (Cosmic Gate B2B3 Intro Mix)
2. Re-Ward - Ensure
3. Terry Ferminal - Deep Inside
4. Genix - Phused (Marcus Schössow Remix)
5. Cosmic Gate Feat. Denise Rivera - Body Of Conflict (Cosmic Gate Club Mix)
6. David Forbes - Rescue
7. Markus Schulz - Fly To Colors (Genix Remix)
8. Tatana - I Can (Duderstadt Uplifting Dub)
9. Vincent De Moor - Fly Away (Cosmic Gate Remix)
10. Bart Claessen - First Light
11. Messler - Prepare (Cosmic Gate B2B3 Edit)
12. Groove Garcia - Code
13. Cosmic Gate - Fire Wire (Cosmic Gate B2B3 Reconstruction)
14. Cosmic Gate - Consciousness
