= Turn Me Out (Praxis song) =

1994 single by Praxis featuring Kathy Brown

Side A label of the original 1994 U.S. vinyl single

"Turn Me Out" is a 1994 single by Praxis featuring Kathy Brown, also titled "Turn Me Out (Turn to Sugar)" for the 1997 single re-release. The song recording was later covered by 2 Shoes in 2012 with the different title and then sampled by Russ Chimes one year later (2013).

== Praxis featuring Kathy Brown version ==
The song was recorded at the Cutting Records studio in New York City. It was released as a single in March 1994 by the Cutting Records. It was re-released into the 1997 single "Turn Me Out (Turn to Sugar)". It made #25 on the Hot Dance Music/Maxi-Singles Sales charts, #1 on the Dance Music/Club Play Singles charts, and when remixed by Guido & Escape in 2003, #42 on the Hot Dance Music/Maxi-Singles Sales charts.

=== Charts ===
Chart (1994)	Position
UK Singles Chart	99
Chart (1995)	Position
Australian Singles Chart	67
UK Singles Chart	44
Chart (1997)	Position
UK Singles Chart	35
US Billboard Hot Dance Music/Maxi-Singles Sales	25
US Billboard Dance Club Songs	1
Chart (2003)	Position
US Billboard Hot Dance Music/Maxi-Singles Sales	42

== 2 Shoes version ==
"Turn Me On (Turn Me Out)"

Single by 2 Shoes
- Released: August 13, 2012
- Recorded: 2012
- Genre: Pop, dance
- Length: 3:08
- Label: All Around the World

2 Shoes singles chronology
"Wishing on a Star" (2011)	"Turn Me On (Turn Me Out)" (2012)

"Turn Me On (Turn Me Out)" is the debut single by British pop duo 2 Shoes. It was released as the album's lead single on 13 August 2012. The music video was released on 21 June 2012.

=== Background ===
"Turn Me On (Turn Me Out)" is yet to receive its first airplay. In March, Heat stated that 2 Shoes had signed a record deal and would be releasing their debut album. On 21 June 2012, Digital Spy confirmed that 2 Shoes had signed the record deal with a Universal Records subsidiary label, All Around the World, best known for dance acts such as Cascada and Tulisa Contostavlos. The news website also confirmed that the duo would be releasing a debut single with a follow-up debut album slated for summer release.

=== Music video ===
The music video begins with 2 Shoes entering a laboratory dressed as lab technicians. Using their iPads, they then control semi-naked men taking different features to create their perfect man and put the different body parts together. Throughout the video, 2 Shoes change costume from laboratory uniform to dresses. At the end of the video, the man, now their perfect creation starts to dance.

The music video was filmed in the UK and premiered on YouTube on June 22, 2012. Since then it has received several views.

=== Release history ===
Country	Date	Format	Label
United Kingdom	August 24, 2012	Digital download	All Around the World

== Russ Chimes version ==
"Turn Me Out" is a 2013 song by Russ Chimes. It samples the Kathy Brown song of the same name, and made #40 on the UK Singles Chart.

== Other versions ==
The version of the song dubbed "Turn Me Out (Turn To Sugar)" is a kind of mashup, because it uses the same sounds that Armand Van Helden crafted (in 1996) to create the remix titled "Armand's Drum 'n'Bass Mix" of "Sugar Is Sweeter" by C. J. Bolland.
