= Russ Chimes =

British DJ

- Birth name: Russ Chimes
- Born: Crowthorne, Berkshire, England
- Genres: Electronic
- Years active: 2007–present
- Labels: Uno Mas Records, Sony Columbia, Virgin Positiva

Russ Chimes is an English producer, remixer and DJ based in London, who produced a song titled "Back 2 You" and had a UK No. 40 hit with "Turn Me Out".

== Select discography ==
=== As lead artist ===
Year	Release	Chart position
2010	Midnight Club EP	
2011	Tonic/Helix EP	
2012	"Back 2 You"	
2013	"Turn Me Out"	40
2014	Sula EP	

=== Remixes ===
Year	Song	Original artist
2008	"Black & Gold"	Sam Sparro
2008	"Fancy Footwork"	Chromeo
2009	"Confusion Girl"	Frankmusik
2009	"Mowgli's Road"	Marina & the Diamonds
2010	"Starry Eyed"	Ellie Goulding
