= Lee Henry =

British singer and record producer

Lee Henry, also known as Lukas Setto, is a singer, songwriter and record producer from Harrow, London. Henry has been featured on the former MTV BASE number one video "Y Did You Leave?", which was released under his production pseudonym “Tru Menace".

== Career ==
As his father worked as a DJ, Henry was brought up around music. Interested in his father's record collection, Henry was inspired by artists such as Michael Jackson, Marvin Gaye, and Stevie Wonder. In 2004, Henry won the Urban Music Award (UMA) for Best Unsigned Act, chosen from over 3000 entrants.

Following his success at the UMA, Henry signed a contract with the management company 2-Tone Entertainment. Following his award, Henry has been critically acclaimed for performances on stage with soul singers Omar and Floetry in venues such as the Jazz Cafe and Cargo. He also went on to support U.S. R&B stars Ne-Yo and Timbaland in concert.

As well as writing and performing his music, Henry has also produced and written for other artists including Omar, Taio Cruz, Kele Le Roc, and Terri Walker.

Henry was due to release his debut album Life and Love in 2007.

Henry also releases works under the moniker Lukas Setto. In 2022, Setto released the singles "My Destiny" and "Get with You Tonight" (with DJ Mark Knight) which received positive reviews.

== Discography ==
Releases as Lukas Setto

Year	Title	Artist/s
2019	"What Turns You On"	Lukas Setto
2020	"Do It Again"	Lukas Setto
2021	"After Dark" EP	Lukas Setto
2022	"My Destiny"	Lukas Setto
2022	"Get With You Tonight"	Lukas Setto, Mark Knight
2023	"Glowing Up"	Lukas Setto

Releases under name Lee Henry

Year	Title	Artist/s
February 2006	"Y Did You Leave?"	Tru Menace ft Lee Henry

Remixes under name of Tru Menace

Year	Title	Artist/s	
August 2007	"Sing (If You Want It)"	Omar	Tru Menace Jump Mix/RNBlend Mix - Blunt Music
September 2007	"Moving On"	Taio Cruz	Jam and Breakbeat Funk Remixes - Island Records/Universal Records UK

Promo - unreleased

Year	Title	Artist/s
June 2007	"Some Other Girl"	Kele Le Roc
July 2007	"I'm On Fire"	Tru Menace ft. Ann-Marie Lataille
June 2005	"Brown Eyes"	Menace 2 Musik

== Videography ==
Year	Title	Artist/s	Chart Position	
February 2006	"Y Did You Leave?"	Tru Menace ft Lee Henry	No. 1 (MTV BASE)	2-Tone Ent. 2006
