= Back 2 Back Vol. 2 =

Remix album by Various artists
- Released: 2005
- Genre: Trance
- Label: Black Hole Recordings

Back 2 Back chronology
Back 2 Back Vol. 2 (2005)	Back 2 Back 3 (2007)

Back 2 Back Vol. 2 is a 2-disc DJ mix by German trance duo Cosmic Gate. Released in 2005, each disc in the volume included mixed songs by the likes of Marco V, Alex M.O.R.P.H and other DJs. It was released on Black Hole Recordings.

== Style ==
Similar to there EP "Different Concept" from 2004, it featured songs that had trance influences but were mostly marked as hard trance. The first disc leaned more on progressive trance and normal trance. The second disc had a few normal trance songs, but mostly had hard trance songs in it.

== Track listing ==
=== Disc 1 ===
1. Cosmic Gate Feat. Jan Johnson - I Feel Wonderful (Cosmic Gate's From AM To PM Mix Edit)
2. Jonas Steur - Castamara
3. Gott & Gordon - Midnight
4. Lost Witness Feat. Tiff Lacey - Home (Mike Shiver Catching Sun Mix)
5. Alex MORPH - New Harvest
6. A Force Feat. Yahel - Behind Silence
7. Acues & Elitist - Zonderland (8 Wonders Mirage At Dusk Mix)
8. Pulser - Point Of Impact
9. T4L - Perfect Blend
10. Purple Haze - Adrenaline
11. Hammer & Bennett - Language (Santiago Nino Dub Tech Mix)
12. Cosmic Gate - Race Car Driver (Back 2 Back Mix)
13. Surge - Morningside (Back 2 Back Mix)
14. Nic Chagall Pres. Encee - Sansibar
15. Re-Locate - Absolum (Back 2 Back Edit)

=== Disc 2 ===
1. E-Craig - Call It A Day (2:12 PM Mix)
2. Mark Norman - T-34
3. Jochen Miller - India (Miller Dub)
4. Cor Fijneman - Banger
5. Marco V - More Than A Life Away (Original Mix)
6. Mojado - Senorita (Mr. Sam Vision)
7. DJ Ray, A.K.A. Joy-T-Suko - Electric (Original Mix)
8. Marc Marberg - Guarana
9. Wippenberg - Earth
10. Joop - Another World
11. Marcel Woods - Cherry Blossom
12. Frisky Warlock - Trespasser
13. Bardini Experience vs. Chris P. - The Movie (Progression Mix)
14. Cosmic Gate - The Drums (Back 2 Back Mix)
15. 64 Bit - Virtual Discotech 1.0 (Cosmic Gate Remix)
