= So Get Up (Cosmic Gate song) =

2013 single by Cosmic Gate featuring Ithaka

Single by Cosmic Gate featuring Ithaka
- Released: 23 September 2013
- Genre: Trance; Spoken word
- Length: 3:41 (Radio Edit)
- Label: Wake Your Mind Records; Kontor Records; Armada Music
- Songwriters: Claus Terhoeven; Stefan Bossems; Ithaka Darin Pappas
- Producers: Claus Terhoeven; Stefan Bossems

Cosmic Gate singles chronology
"Crushed" (2012)	"So Get Up" (2013)	"Falling Back (with Eric Lumiere)" (2015)

Music video
- "Cosmic Gate "So Get Up" featuring Ithaka" on YouTube

"So Get Up" is a song by German, Grammy-nominated electronic music duo Cosmic Gate (members: Claus Terhoeven, Stefan Bossems) featuring Greek-American lyricist-vocalist Ithaka, (including its subsequent nine officially-sanctioned versions and remixes).

== Release ==
The song was initially released in 2013, as the first single on the newly formed Wake Your Mind Records (an affiliate of Armin van Buuren's label Armada Music, then later appeared on the Cosmic Gate's critically acclaimed 2104 album entitled, Start To Feel.

== Reception ==
American Songwriter said of So Get Up, singles including ‘So Get Up’ cemented the album Start to Feel's reputation.

The Seattle-based magazine Dance Music North West says of "So Get Up" by Cosmic Gate featuring Ithaka, a track that completely captures the essence of trance, asking us to “forget the past, go outside, and have a blast.”.

Discotech Magazine said, Winning widespread praise from the press, ‘So Get Up’ was seen by both fans and the media alike as an aptly bold new avenues of musical exploration by Cosmic Gate.

Jack Central described the song as "A club-quake single".

== Worldwide performances ==
From 2013 until present day, Comic Gate has played So Get Up at events around the world including Tomorrowland, Amsterdam Dance Event, Electric Daisy Carnival, Ultra Music Festival - and on Cosmic Gate's own world tours.

The song has also been featured in filmed sequences such as the Sundowner set in San Miguel de Allende.

== DJ Endorsements ==
On September 13th 2013, superstar DJ Hardwell, was the first DJ to preview the track to the general public, on episode #133 on his electronic music webcast Hardwell On Air. And at the end of 2013, Armin van Buuren included the radio edit of "So Get Up" on his show and compilation album, A State of Trance MIX 2013.

== Track listing (including official mixes) ==
=== 2013 ===
- Cosmic Gate "So Get Up" ft. Ithaka [WYM Records]
1. "So Get Up" (Radio Edit) — 3:41 — [ISRC# NLF711310382]
2. "So Get Up" (Extended Mix) — 6:42 — [ISRC#NLF711310196]

=== 2014 ===
- Cosmic Gate "So Get Up" ft. Ithaka (remixes) [WYM Records]
1. "So Get Up" (Ben Gold Remix) — 3:17 — [ISRC# NLF711400036]
2. "So Get Up" (Heatbeat Radio Edit) — 3:00 — [ISRC# NLF711400037]
3. "So Get Up" (Pelari Radio Edit) — 3:01 — [ISRC# NLF711400038]
4. "So Get Up" (Ben Gold Remix) — 6:06 — [ISRC# NLF711400033]
5. "So Get Up" (Heatbeat Radio Edit) — 5:07 — [ISRC# NLF711400034]
6. "So Get Up" (Pelari Remix) — 4:16 — [ISRC# NLF711400035]

=== 2016 ===
- Cosmic Gate "So Get Up" ft. Ithaka (Alex Di Stefano Remix) [WYM Records]
1. "So Get Up" (Alex Di Stefano Remix) — 6:06

=== 2018 ===
- Cosmic Gate "So Get Up" ft. Ithaka (Live at Tomorrowland)
1. "So Get Up" (Alex Di Stefano Remix, Live at Tomorrowland version) — 4:41

== Publishing ==
So Get Up by Cosmic Gate featuring Ithaka is published by Sociedade Portuguesa de Autores, Ravenshark Music/North Music Group, BMG Gold Songs, and American Society of Composers, Authors and Publishers.

== Charts ==
Chart (2013)	Peak position
Beatport EDM Chart	1
