= Martijn ten Velden =

- Genres: House, electro, tech house
- Occupations: Record producer, DJ, musician
- Instruments: Keyboards, turntables
- Years active: 1993-present
- Labels: Phonetic, Defected, About Us, Go Deeva, Redolent Music
- Website: http://martijntenvelden.com/

Martijn ten Velden (born circa 1972) is a Dutch house music DJ and producer from Haarlem.

== Biography ==
Born and raised in Haarlem, Martijn ten Velden has established himself as a DJ/producer on an international level, playing tech-house, minimal sets to crowds all over the world.

The track ‘I Feel Good’ by Audio Drive (his early alias) was the first release on the UK dance label Toolroom Records in 2003. From here on, Martijn became deeply involved in flourishing the catalogue of Toolroom Records for the following years and did a lot of original productions and remixes with Mark Knight. The duo notably remixed the Soul Central classic "Strings Of Life" on Defected Records and it became a huge club anthem in Ibiza in Summer 2004 and 2005. Moreover, It made a successful breakthrough in the UK and Europe DJ club scene and became a classic anthem years later.

Martijn Ten Velden is also well known for chart-toppers including "I Wish You Would" which became a huge anthem in Ibiza during Summer 2006 and 2007. In 2008, his track "Together" hit number 1 in the UK Buzz Chart, number 2 in the Musicweek Coolcuts, became a big anthem in Ibiza and got support from all the top jocks. Martijn’s 2008 remix on Defected Records, the Shapeshifters remake of Orbital’s classic anthem "Chime" also became an anthem and rocked clubs worldwide. Other big remixes of Martjin Ten Velden include Mason "Exceeder", Heller & Farley "Ultra Flava", Ferrer & Sydenham "Sandcastles", Holmes St Ives "8 Letters", Fresh & Juicy "Blow that Door", Astro "Awake or Dreaming" and going back in time even more he remixed Miss Dynamite's first single "BOOOO!", Natasha Bedingfield's "Single", and DB Boulevard's "Point of View".

In 2007, with Splittr, a collaboration with Mark Yardley from the Stanton Warriors, he made a track called "All Alone", that was a big club success. In the same period, Martijn also notably remixed with Mark Knight the track "Incredible" by the Shapeshifters.

Martijn ten Velden has earned the support from notable DJs like Roger Sanchez, Deep Dish and Steve Lawler. Martijn was nominated for Best Artist and Outstanding Remix at 2006’s House Music Awards. In 2007, Martijn won the Award for Best International DJ at the Danish Dance Music Awards. Miami Winter Music Conference 2008 also saw Martijn’s compilation ‘Toolroom Knights Vol 1’ on Toolroom Records up for nomination at the 2008 IDMA Awards, for ‘Best Compilation’ which was up against MOS The Annual and Ultra Dance 08 on Ultra Records.

In 2010, Martijn ten Velden released a track called "Together Alright" on Phonetic Recordings (The label of Rob Roar), a combination between a track of him called "Together" and the vocals of Red Carpet's "Alright". This track was successfully acclaimed by the UK's and European DJ scene that year.

In 2015, Martijn ten Velden made a remix of "Guitarra G" that ranked #1 in the DMC Buzz Charts and that was in the Beatport top 100 during three months in a row. In 2016, Martijn ten Velden remixed a track from Armin Van Buuren called "Mirage", which was released on Armada Music. In 2017, Martijn Ten Velden collaborated with Staves to produce a record called "Feeling Of Sa Penya". In the same year, he also released a remix of Superfunk's Lucky Star 2017.

He worked with Phonetic Records and Toolroom Trax and was signed to Defected Records as well as Eye Industries under his moniker, Splittr.

From 2017 to 2021, Martijn was a resident DJ at Experimental Beach Ibiza where he often played six hour DJ sets. In 2019, Martijn Ten Velden set up a new record label called "About Us Music", on which he released the tracks "Strings Attached" and "A New Beginning". In February 2022, Martijn Ten Velden moved to Brazil. Martijn is now based in Balneario Camboriu, and in the last few years he played gigs all over Brazil. Meanwhile, he is actively working on new music again. Indeed, Martijn ten Velden is currently working on new solo productions and remixes, with new collaborations, as well as touring worldwide.

== Discography ==
=== Original Productions ===
- 1991 Kobalt 60 - "Chaos From Order / Concrete Show" (Music Of Life)
- 1991 Prime Rhyme Masters - "You Need Discipline" (Cold Sweat)
- 1992 Son Of Noise - "Technics Styles Skills" (Cold Sweat)
- 1992 Ignorants - The Epitome Of Ignorants (Album) (Polydor)
- 1993 Son Of Noise - "Crazy Mad Flow" (Little Rascool)
- 1993 Ignorants - "Phat Girls / Rewind / Candystore" (Polydor)
- 1994 Saxual Harassment - "Soul Note EP" / Phat Vibes 1993" (Cnr Indisc)
- 1995 Saxual Harassment - The Bare Essentials (Album) (CNR Indisc)
- 1995 Saxual Harassment - "Blow It Up EP" (CNR Indisc)
- 1995 Saxual Harassment - "Energy Sound" (CNR Indisc)
- 1996 Nicotine - "Old School Hip Hop Makes The New School" (Free Style Records)
- 1998 Another Level - "No Diggity/Shake What Ya Mama Gave Ya"(Northwestside)
- 1999 Zeus And Osiris - "Wiggle Laugh Giggle" (Party Breaks)
- 1999 Zeus And Osiris - "Drop That" (Party Breaks)
- 2001 Disco Brothers - "Lets Go" (Nucleus)
- 2001 Audio Drive - "Don't Wanna Come Down" (Ultra Vinyl)
- 2002 Audio Drive - "Remember When? / The Theme" (Dirty Skankin' Sounds)
- 2002 Audio Drive - "Hypnotize Me" (Dirty Skankin' Sounds)
- 2002 Kylie Minogue - "Whenever You Feel Like It" (Emi/Warner Bros)
- 2002 Audio Drive featuring Earl 16 - "Release Yourself" (Dirty Skankin' Sounds)
- 2003 Filth Rockers - "Here I Come" (Roccoco)
- 2003 Joe & Jessey - "Traumarchiv" (Kosmomusic)
- 2003 Jimmy Cliff V Audio Drive - "Fantastic Plastic People" (Dirty Skankin' Sounds)
- 2003 Audio Drive - "Voodoo Magic EP" / Fluential (Defected)
- 2003 Audio Drive - "I Feel Good" (Toolroom Records)
- 2003 Martijn ten Velden vs Fierce & Jez - "Come Get My Lovin" / Fantastic House (High Bias)
- 2003 Mark Knight & Martijn ten Velden - "Our House EP" (DTPM Records)
- 2004 Mark Knight & Martijn ten Velden - "Acid Test / Piano Test" (Fantastic House)
- 2004 The Hedgetrimmerz - "Trim My Triangle EP" (Toolroom Trax)
- 2004 Martijn ten Velden - "Sureshot EP" (Nocturnal Groove)
- 2005 Martijn ten Velden & Mark Knight ft E.Man - "A New Reality" (1Trax)
- 2005 Martijn ten Velden & Lucien Foort - "Bleeep!" (Toolroom Trax)
- 2006 Martijn ten Velden & Luciana - "I Wish You Would" (Phonetic Recordings)
- 2006 Martijn ten Velden & Lucien Foort - "Bassification" (Toolroom Trax)
- 2007 Splittr - "All Alone" (Eye Industries / Be Yourself Music)
- 2009 Martijn ten Velden - "Together" (Phonetic Recordings)
- 2009 Martijn ten Velden & Afroboogie - "Desert Storm EP" (Defected Records)
- 2010 Martijn ten Velden vs Red Carpet - "Together Alright" (Phonetic Recordings)
- 2012 Mark Knight & Martijn ten Velden - "Morena" (Toolroom Records)
- 2013 Martijn ten Velden - "Shake Your" (Papagaio Records)
- 2015 Martijn ten Velden - "I Wish U Would 2015" (Phonetic Recordings)
- 2017 Martijn ten Velden - "Octagon" 2017 (DAYS like NIGHTS)
- 2017 Sandy Rivera & Martijn ten Velden - "Simple" (Deep Visionz)
- 2017 Martijn ten Velden, Staves - "Feeling of Sa Penya"
- 2017 Martijn ten Velden - "Digital Music" (Freakin'303)
- 2017 Martijn ten Velden - "Chinco" (Innocent Music)
- 2018 Martijn ten Velden - "Timpano" (DAYS like NIGHTS)
- 2019 Martijn ten Velden - "A New Beginning" (About Us Music)
- 2019 Martijn ten Velden - "Magna" (About Us Music)
- 2019 Martijn ten Velden - "Strings Attached" (About Us Music)
- 2019 Martijn ten Velden - "Transition" (About Us Music)
- 2019 Martijn ten Velden - "The Duke" (About Us Music)
- 2019 Martijn ten Velden - "Breaking Bells" (About Us Music)
- 2023 Martijn ten Velden & DJ Dove - "Double Dutch" (Variety Music)
- 2024 Martijn ten Velden - "Balneario" (Redolent Music)
- 2024 Martijn ten Velden - "Exhale" (Go Deeva Records)
- 2024 Martijn ten Velden - "Inhale" (Go Deeva Records)
- 2024 Martijn ten Velden - "I Just Wanna Go" (Redolent Music)
- 2024 Martijn ten Velden - "Balneario" (Redolent Music)
- 2025 Martijn ten Velden & CATTCH - "Dreamcatcher" (Plastic Fantastic Records)

=== Mashups ===
- 2009 Juan Kidd & Felix Baumgartner vs Enzyme Black - "Now You're Gone vs I Can See The Light" (Defected Records)
- 2009 Chris Montana vs Powers That Be - "Speed Of Life vs Planet Rock" (Defected Records)
- 2009 DJ Gomi vs Jay J & Chris Lum - "Glad I Found You vs Freaks Like Us" (Defected Records)
- 2009 Julien Jabre vs Hardsoul - "Swimming Places vs Self Religion" (Defected Records)
- 2009 Dj Gregory vs Mike Dunn - "Attend 1 vs Feel the Music" (Defected Records)

=== Remixes ===
- 1995 Jex Mf Ft Shy Rock - "Horny" (Cnr Indisc)
- 1999 Shamika - "The Reason Why" (Rhythm Records)
- 1999 Natural Impact - "Dont You Even Try" (Rhythm Records)
- 1999 Jay Anthony - "Every Little Thing" (Rhythm Records)
- 2001 Trisco - "Muzac" (Positiva)
- 2001 Sticky Ft Ms Dynamite - "Booo!" (FFRR)
- 2001 Michael Moog - "You Belong To Me" (Audio Drive's Underwater Remix) (Strictly Rhythm)
- 2001 Eddie Grant - "Walking On Sunshine" (Audio Drive's Midi Mayhem Dub) (WEA)
- 2001 Cricco Castelli - "Buena Vista" (Audio Drive's Formula 1 Mix) (Hiptonic)
- 2001 Supakings - "Back And Forth" (Audio Drive's Classic Mix) (Code Blue)
- 2001 W.O.S.P - "Gettin' Into You" (David James Audiodrive Remix) (Ministry Of Sound)
- 2002 Flawless Vs Soul Providers - "The Ones & Rise" (DMC House Nation)
- 2002 DB Boulevard - "Point Of View" (Illustrious)
- 2002 Agent Sumo - "Why" (Virgin)
- 2002 Baz - "Promises" (Audio Drive Full Vocal Mix) (One Little Indian)
- 2002 Tom Novy - "It's Over" (Audio Drive Remix) (Kosmomusic)
- 2002 Sugababes - "Angels With Dirty Faces" (Audio Drive Remix) (Universal)
- 2003 Muave Ft Steven Granville - "Love Or Desire" (Ultra Vinyl)
- 2003 Deepah Ones - "Freak" (Audio Drive Remix) (Defected Records)
- 2003 Prophets Of Sound - "Tide Of Dreams" (Audio Drive Remix) (Distinctive)
- 2003 Solarys - "Let The Sunshine In" (Nebula)
- 2003 Shahi - "Royal Bengal" (Mark Knight & Martijn ten Velden Remix) (Toolroom Records)
- 2004 TJ Cases - "Do It Again" (XTrax)
- 2004 Allistair Whitehead - "Let The Music (Use You)" (Mark Knight & Martijn ten Velden Remix) (Toolroom Records)
- 2004 Erro - "Don't Change" (Z Records)
- 2004 Hool V Bruckheimer - "In The Beginning" (Mark Knight & Martijn ten Velden Remix) (Toolroom Trax)
- 2004 Natasha Bedingfield - "Single" (BMG)
- 2004 Project Orange - "The Game" (Mark Knight & Martijn ten Velden Remix) (DTPM Recordings)
- 2004 Steve Lawler - "Lost" (Mark Knight & Martijn ten Velden Extended Remix) (Subversive Records)
- 2004 Soul Central - "Strings Of Life" (Martijin Ten Velden & Mark Knight Toolroom Mix) (Defected Records)
- 2004 Brad Carter - "Morning Always Comes Too Soon" (Positiva)
- 2004 ATFC - "Fall Down" (Mark Knight & Martijn Ten Velden Remix) (Onephatdeeva)
- 2004 Portobella - "Viva La Difference" (Martijn Ten Velden Remix) (Island / Eye Industries)
- 2004 Granite & Phunk - "Knock u Over" (Mark Knight & Martijn Ten Velden Remix) (Toolroom Records)
- 2005 Ferrer & Sydenham - "Sandcastles" (Martijn Ten Velden & Mark Knight Remix) (Defected)
- 2005 Holmes St. Ives - "8 Letters" (Martijn Ten Velden Remix) (Yoshitoshi)
- 2005 Narcotic Thrust - "When the Dawn Breaks" (Martijn Ten Velden Remix) Yoshitoshi)
- 2005 Kings of Tomorrow - "6 PM" (Mark Knight & Martijn Ten Velden Skunk Funk Mix) (Defected Records)
- 2005 Soul Central - "Need You Now" (Martijn Ten Velden & Mark Knight Remix) (Defected Records)
- 2005 Southside Hustlers - "Right Before My Eyes"(Martijn Ten Velden Remix) (Toolroom Records)
- 2005 Max Linen - "Back To Mine"(Martijn Ten Velden's Bondage Workout) (Phonetic Recordings)
- 2005 Jesse Garcia - "Let's get Happy" (Martijn Ten Velden Audio Drive Remix) (Stealth Records)
- 2006 The Shapeshifters - "Incredible" (Martijn Ten Velden Remix) (Nocturnal Groove/Positiva)
- 2006 Mark Knight - "Insatiable" (Mark Knight & Martijn Ten Velden Remix) (Toolroom Records)
- 2006 Astro - "Awake or Dreaming" (Martijn Ten Velden Vocal Mix) (Phonetic Recordings)
- 2006 Last Rhythm - "Last Rhythm" (Martijn Ten Velden Remake) (Renaissancs)
- 2006 The Shapeshifters & Chic - "Sensitivity" (Martijn Ten Velden Remix) (Positiva)
- 2006 Mason - "Exceeder" (Martijn Ten Velden Remix) (Boss Records / Data)
- 2006 Sucker DJ's ft. Tiger Lily - "Firework" (Mark Knight & Martijn Ten Velden Remix) (Toolroom Records)
- 2006 Rock Steady Crew - "Hey You!" (Martijn Ten Velden Remix) (Phonetic Recordings / EMI)
- 2007 Laura Kidd - "Automatic" (Martijn Ten Velden Remix) (Eye Industries)
- 2007 Bodyrox ft. Luciana - "What Planet U On" (Martijn Ten Velden Remix) (Phonetic Recordings)
- 2007 Laidback Luke Feat. Stephen Granville - Blow That Door (Martijn Ten Velden Mix)
- 2008 The Shapeshifters - "Chime" (Martijn Ten Velden Remix) (Defected Records)
- 2009 Heller & Farley Project - "Ultra Flava" (Martijn Ten Velden Remix) (Defected Records)
- 2009 Twilo People - "Without You" (Martijn Ten Velden Edit) (Toolroom Records)
- 2009 Martin Acorsi - "This is How We Do" (Martijn Ten Velden Sci-Fi Mix) (Stealth Records)
- 2009 The Believers - "Who Dares To Believe In Me" (Martijn Ten Velden Remix) (Strictly Rhythm)
- 2010 Belocca & Soneec - "Bla Bla" / (Martijn Ten Velden Remix)(Stealth Records)
- 2011 Sharam Jey - "Day After" (Martijn ten Velden's Tribute Mix) (Toolroom Records)
- 2012 Arkoss - "Yup Yup" (Martijn Ten Velden Remix) (Funkinyou)
- 2014 Good and Plenty - "Voodoo Vibes" (Martijn Ten Velden Remix) (Klass Action)
- 2014 2 Good Souls - "Death of Technics" (Martijn Ten Velden Remix) (Seamless Recordings)
- 2015 Nicky Romero & Vicetone - "Let Me Feel" (Martijn Ten Velden Remix) (Protocol Records)
- 2015 DASCO ft. Crystal Monee - "Strike Me Down" (Martijn Ten Velden Remix) (Phonetic Recordings)
- 2015 Barber & James Trystan ft Marissa - "Falling Free" (Martijn Ten Velden Remix) (Seamless Recordings)
- 2015 G Club presents: Banda Sonora - "Guitarra G" (Martijn Ten Velden Remix) (Phonetic Recordings / Defected Records)
- 2016 IDQ - "Your Soul" (Martijn Ten Velden Remix) (Urbana)
- 2016 Armin van Buuren - "Mirage" (Martijn Ten Velden Extended Remix) (Armada Music)
- 2017 Ron Carroll - "Lucky Star" (Martijn Ten Velden Remix) (Great Stuff)
- 2018 Juanito - "Tamborero" (Martijn Ten Velden Remix) (Voyeur Music)
- 2018 Rhythm Masters - Dayhunter (Martijn Ten Velden Extended Remix) (Armada Deep)
- 2020 John Creamer - "I Wish You Were Here" (Martijn Ten Velden Remix) (Ready Mix Records)
- 2025 Martijn Ten Velden & CATTCH - "Dreamcatcher" (Martijn Ten Velden Remix) (Plastic Fantastic Records)
