= Promised Land (Joe Smooth song) =

1987 single by Joe Smooth

- UK CD single

Single by Joe Smooth

from the album Promised Land
- Released: 1987 (US); 1989 (UK)
- Genre: House; deep house
- Label: D.J. International
- Songwriter: Joe Smooth
- Producer: Joe Smooth

Joe Smooth singles chronology
"Promised Land" (1987)	"I'll Be There" (1988)

Music video
- "Promised Land" on YouTube

"Promised Land" is a song by American producer and DJ Joe Smooth, featuring Anthony Thomas and Don Connolly, released in 1987 by label D.J. International as a single from his album by the same name (1987). It is one of the most widely acclaimed house music classics. Following the Top 40 success of a cover version released in the UK by British band The Style Council, it peaked at number 56 on the UK Singles Chart in February 1989.

== Background and release ==
As a self-taught musician and starting creating original music at the age of 12, Joe Smooth grew up listening to Gene Kelly, Fred Astaire and musical shows. After his mother bought a piano, he would spend many hours a day on the piano, figuring out how to play songs. In high school, he got into deejaying at parties in the street and events in the neighborhoods, and ended up in an alternative rock club in Chicago, Smart Bar. Smooth was given the job as a DJ as their former DJ moved and took his name Smooth because some of the bartenders in the bar said: "Joe mixes it so smoothly." He got the idea for "Promised Land" while he was on tour in Europe with Farley "Jackmaster" Funk. He saw how well house music was received in Europe and wrote "Promised Land" with inspiration from classic Motown songs. He was determined to write a classic song with the same type of spirit, what inspired him to make the song. To create it, he used a Roland TR-707, TR-727, Ensoniq Mirage and Juno 106.

He told in an interview, "Then from that it was like, okay, we need some words to capture the feeling of this music. And so that's why I sat down and wrote the lyrics to 'Promised Land'." Smooth originally used his own vocals but at the time he did so much in the background and wanted somebody else to be the lead. So he had Anthony Thomas, whom he had worked with earlier on a track called "Going Down", doing the vocals with Don Connolly performing the more high end, falsetto vocals. Smooth gained international acclaim with the release of the track and it became a big club-hit. It spoke of how humans, as brothers and sisters, should unite in love and thrive in paradise. It was big also in South Africa to the point when Nelson Mandela was released from prison. Smooth was contacted by Mandela's people and CNN about creating a new song to play during his release, which resulted in "They Want to Be Free".

He told in 2025, "'Promised Land' is a song of hope, love, peace. And I think that resounded with the people of Africa. For me, it's a song for the people. It makes me proud that the song has stood the test of time. It has transitioned, you know, over these 40 years and that it has found a place as a house anthem."

== Impact and legacy ==
In 1994, French DJ Laurent Garnier named "Promised Land" one of his favourites of all time, saying, "I played this recently at the Leisure Lounge. It's a classic — beautiful lyrics, a positive song. Joe Smooth gave it to me when we met once at the Hacienda. It'll always be in my box." In 1995, British DJ Graham Gold also named it one of his favourite songs, adding, "I got it in '89 when I wasn't known for playing house. It's one of those wicked emotional records where the lyrical and musical content is so uplifting that you never get tired of hearing it." Same year, British hardhouse and trance music record producer Jon the Dentist named it one of his favourites, saying, "It's got uplifting vocals. I hate singing but I'm always singing along when I play it. I'm sure people are thinking, who's that prat in the DJ box. It's what deep house should be all about."

In 1996, British electronic dance and clubbing magazine Mixmag ranked the song number 20 in its "100 Greatest Dance Singles of All Time" list, adding, "There's 'Someday' and 'Strings of Life' and 'Chime' and 'Keep On Moving', but the one record that, for me, sums up the excitement of that period of music more than any other is the incredible spiritual burst of optimism that is Joe Smooth's 'Promised Land'." In 1998, DJ Magazine ranked it number four in their list of "Top 100 Club Tunes". In October 2004, "Promised Land" appeared in the video game Grand Theft Auto: San Andreas. Within the game, the song could be heard playing on the fictional house radio station SF-UR. In 2018, Mixmag listed it as one of "The 30 Best Vocal House Anthems Ever". In 2019, Spin Magazine ranked "Promised Land" among "The 40 Best Deep House Tracks of All Time". In 2025, Billboard ranked it number 24 in their list of "The 50 Best House Songs of All Time".

== Track listing ==
- 12", US (1987)
1. "Promised Land" (Club Mix)
2. "Promised Land" (Underground Mix)
3. "Promised Land" (Radio Mix)
- 7" single, UK (1988)
1. "Promised Land" (Radio Mix)
2. "Promised Land" (Underground Mix)
- 12", West Germany (1988)
1. "Promised Land" (Club Mix) – 5:07
2. "Promised Land" (Underground Mix) – 4:10
3. "Promised Land" (Freestyle Mix) – 5:07
- 12" single, UK (1988)
1. "Promised Land" (Club Mix) – 5:08
2. "Promised Land" (Underground Mix) – 4:11
3. "Promised Land" (Freestyle Mix) – 5:10

== Charts ==
Chart (1989)	Peak position
UK Singles (OCC)	56

== The Style Council version ==
"Promised Land"

Single by The Style Council
- B-side: "Can You Still Love Me?"
- Released: February 13, 1989
- Genre: House
- Length: 3:45 (pianopella); 7:04 (longer version)
- Label: Polydor
- Songwriter: Joe Smooth
- Producer: The Style Council

The Style Council singles chronology
"It Didn't Matter" (1987)	"Promised Land" (1989)

Music video
- "Promised Land" on YouTube

British band the Style Council released a cover of "Promised Land" in February 1989 as a single only by Polydor. Along with the track "Can You Still Love Me", "Promised Land" was the group's only entry on the US Billboard Hot Dance Club Play chart, where it peaked at No. 19. The song also reached No. 22 on the Irish Singles Chart. Technically, the Style Council couldn't release a cover of the record until it was released by Joe Smooth in the UK. The day his version of "Promised Land" was released there, they released their version. In 2025, Smooth told, "The original probably didn't get the momentum that it could have gotten because they were both in the independent charts at the same time. You know, I looked at it as, okay, this is going to give it a whole different audience. The fact that The Style Council released their version on the same day, they did keep the original version a little more underground."

=== Track listing ===
- 7-inch single, UK (1989)

A. "Promised Land" (Radio Edit) – 2:50
B. "Can You Still Love Me" (Vocal) – 4:18

- 12-inch vinyl, UK (1989)

A1. "Promised Land" (Longer Version) – 7:04
A2. "Promised Land" (Pianopella Version) – 3:45
B1. "Can You Still Love Me?" (Dub) – 4:18
B2. "Can You Still Love Me?" (Vocal) – 4:18

- CD single, UK (1989)
1. "Promised Land" (Radio Edit) – 2:50
2. "Promised Land" (Longer Version) – 7:04
3. "Can You Still Love Me?" (Vocal) – 4:18
4. "Can You Still Love Me?" (Dub) – 4:18

=== Charts ===
Chart (1989)	Peak position
Ireland (IRMA)	22
UK Singles (OCC)	27
Hot Dance Club Play (Billboard)	19
