= Mark Knight (DJ) =

British DJ and producer (born 1973)

- Born: 20 June 1973 (age 53); Maidstone, Kent, England
- Genres: Tech house, house, dance, UK garage
- Occupations: Record producer, remixer, DJ
- Instruments: Keyboards, turntables
- Years active: 2001–present
- Label: Toolroom Records
- Website: djmarkknight.com

Mark Knight (born 20 June 1973) is a British disc jockey and house music producer. He is the founder of Toolroom Records, one of the biggest house, tech house and dance labels of the United Kingdom.

== Career ==
Knight founded record label Toolroom Records in 2003, which hosts artists including David Guetta, Deadmau5, and Jaguar Skills. He has released several singles on his own label, and was nominated at the 52nd annual Grammy awards for his work on the Black Eyed Peas album The E.N.D. Along with Funkagenda, Knight won the Track of the Season award for his release "Man with the Red Face" at the 2008 DJ Awards.

In 2015, Knight released dancefloor anthem "Second Story" which BBC Radio 1 DJ Pete Tong deemed his "essential new tune" for June, following on from being inducted into Tong's Hall of Fame that same year. Knight's debut album A Year in the Life, released in 2016, was a retrospective mix of his releases from the previous year. His second album, Untold Business, was released in 2021. In 2022, Knight collaborated with Lukas Setto to produce the single "Get with You Tonight", which was released to positive reviews.. In 2024, the release of the track "I Got All This Love", produced in collaboration with James Hurr and Darius Syrossian, was positively received in Europe and in the USA.

== Discography ==
=== Singles ===
- 2008 Mark Knight & Funkagenda - Man With The Red Face (Original Mix)
- 2009 Mark Knight & Koen Groeneveld - Put Your Hands Up
- 2010 Mark Knight & Funkagenda - Antidote (Original Club Mix)
- 2010 Mark Knight & D.Ramirez v Underworld - Downpipe (Original Club Mix)
- 2012 Mark Knight - Together (Original Club Mix)
- 2013 Mark Knight - Your Love (Original Club Mix)
- 2013 Sander van Doorn & Mark Knight V Underworld - Ten
- 2014 Mark Knight (feat. Skin) - Nothing Matters (Original Club Mix)
- 2014 Mark Knight - The Return Of Wolfy
- 2014 Mark Knight & Discoworker Feat Robbie Leslie - The Diary Of A Studio 54 DJ (Original Mix)
- 2014 Mark Knight - In And Out (Original Mix)
- 2015 Mark Knight & Adrian Hour - Freak Out (Original Mix)
- 2015 Mark Knight & Adrian Hour feat Indiana - Dance On My Heart
- 2015 Mark Knight - Ironing Man
- 2015 Mark Knight & Prok & Fitch - Into My Life
- 2016 Mark Knight - Yebisah
- 2016 Mark Knight - In The Pocket (Original Mix)
- 2017 Mark Knight, Tuff London - Jus' Come (Original Mix)
- 2018 Mark Knight Feat. Shovell - Selecao (Original Mix)
- 2018 Mark Knight Feat. Mr V - We Get High From The Music (Original Mix)
- 2018 Mark Knight & Danny Howard - You Can Do It Baby (Original Mix)
- 2019 Mark Knight - The General (Original Mix)
- 2020 Mark Knight - Mona Lisa (Extended Mix)
- 2020 Mark Knight & Rene Amesz - All 4 Love (feat. Tasty Lopez) (Extended Mix)
- 2020 Mark Knight (feat. Chenai & Mr. V) - Tonight (Extended Mix)
- 2021 Mark Knigh & Maxinne (feat. MC Flipside) - That Soul (Extended Mix)
- 2021 Mark Knight & Siege - Give It Up (Extended Mix)
- 2021 Mark Knight & Beverley Knight (ft. London Community Gospel Choir) - Everything's Gonna Be Alright (Extended Mix)
- 2021 Mark Knight, Darius Syrossian & Prospect Park - Get This Feeling (Extended Mix)
- 2021 Mark Knight, James Hurr & Laura Davie - Movin (Extended Mix)
- 2022 Mark Knight, Armand Van Helden - The Music Began To Play
- 2022 Mark Knight & James Hurr (feat. Cari Golden) - You Are A God (Extended Mix)
- 2022 Mark Knight & Gene Farris - I Can't Go For That (Extended Mix)
- 2022 Mark Knight, Crusy - Daddy Shhh
- 2022 Mark Knight, Lukas Setto - Get With You Tonight (Extended Mix)
- 2022 Mark Knight & Joey Musaphia (feat. Juliet Roberts) - Miss You (Extended Mix)
- 2023 Mark Knight, Green Velvet, James Hurr - The Greatest Thing Alive
- 2023 Mark Knight, James Hurr - Lady (Hear Me Tonight)
- 2023 Mark Knight, Nitro Deluxe - Brutal
- 2023 Mark Knight, Todd Terry, James Hurr (ft. Darryl James, David Anthony) - Make You Happy
- 2023 Armand Van Helden, Mark Knight - Down To Earth (Extended Mix)
- 2024 Mark Knight, Wh0, James Hurr (feat. Kathy Brown) - Turn Me Deeper
- 2024 Mark Knight, Darius Syrossian, James Hurr - I Got All This Love
- 2024 Mark Knight, James Hurr - You Take Me Higher
- 2024 Mark Knight, Beverley Knight (feat. London Community Gospel Choir) - Everything's Gonna Be Alright
- 2024 Mark Knight, Harry Romero, Chus & Ceballos (feat. Cevin Fisher) - The Machines
- 2025 Mark Knight, Saliva Commandos - Don Dadda
- 2025 Mark Knight, Dario Nunez - Route 143
- 2025 Mark Knight, James Hurr - I Don't Wanna Come Down
- 2025 Mark Knight, Roland Clark - Televised
- 2026 Mark Knight, Pietro, Rome Fortune - Shut It Down
- 2026 Mark Knight, Wh0 - Clap Your Hands
- 2026 Armand Van Helden, Mark Knight, D. Ramirez - You

=== Remixes ===
- 2005 Soul Central - Strings Of Life (Martijn ten Velden & Mark Knight Toolroom Mix)
- 2009 Faithless - Music Matters (Mark Knight Remix)
- 2010 Tensnake - Coma Cat (Mark Knight Remix)
- 2010 Faithless - Sun To Me (Mark Knight Remix)
- 2011 Florence and the Machine - You've Got the Love (Mark Knight Remix)
- 2014 Marlon Hoffstadt, Dansson - Shake That (Mark Knight Remix)
- 2019 David Guetta, Raye - Stay (Don't Go Away) (Mark Knight Extended Mix)
- 2019 C.O.T. - Let It Go (Mark Knight Extended Edit)
- 2019 DJ Lora - 20 Girls (Mark Knight Edit)
- 2019 Booka Shade - Trespass 2019 (Mark Knight Remix)
- 2019 Dido - Give You Up (Mark Knight Remix)
- 2020 Mason - Drowning In Your Love (feat. Jem Cooke) (Mark Knight Extended Mix)
- 2020 Anane - Get On The Funk Train (Michael Gray & Mark Knight Mix)
- 2020 Jasper Street Co. - Paradise (Mark Knight & Michael Gray Remix)
- 2020 Dosem - Right Time (Mark Knight Remix)
- 2020 Andrea Giudice & Larry Cadge - Baby (Mark Knight Rework)
- 2021 Ingram - D.J.'s Delight (Mark Knight & Michael Gray Extended)
- 2021 M&S presents The Girl Next Door - Salsoul Nugget (If You Wanna) (Mark Knight Remix)
- 2021 SG Lewis, Nile Rodgers - One More (Mark Knight Remix)
- 2021 Tim Baresko - Llego La (Mark Knight Remix)
- 2021 AVIRA - The Worship (Mark Knight Extended Remix)
- 2021 Ministers De La Funk feat. Jocelyn Brown - Believe (Mark Knight Extended Remix)
- 2022 Avicii & Sebastien Drums - My Feelings For You (Mark Knight Remix)
- 2024 Curtis Mayfield - Move On Up (Mark Knight Remix)
- 2025 Joe Smooth - Promised Land (Mark Knight & James Hurr Extended Remix)
