= Kathy Brown =

American singer (born 1960)

- Born: July 12, 1960 (age 66)
- Origin: South Carolina, U.S.
- Genres: Dance, house
- Occupation: Singer
- Years active: 1993–present

Kathy Brown (born July 12, 1960) is an American dance and house singer from South Carolina. Her credits include vocals on the songs "Turn Me Out (Turn to Sugar)" and "Strings of Life (Stronger on My Own)".

== Career ==
Brown began singing in her local gospel choir. After joining the contemporary R&B group Sweet Cinnamon. Kathy met with New York-based producer David Shaw through a mutual friend. This collaboration led to her first single, "Can't Play Around", released in 1993, which was a number-13 hit on the US Billboard Hot Dance Music/Club Play chart.

Brown scored number-one success as the lead singer of Praxis, a musical project assembled by producers Cevin Fisher and David Shaw. Praxis's "Turn Me Out", first released in 1994, has been remixed and re-released several times since, with two subsequent US Billboard Hot Dance Music/Club Play chart entries, including 1997's "Turn Me Out (Turn To Sugar)", which hit number one. "Turn Me Out" returned to the dance chart in 2003 with new remixes, this time climbing to number 42. Brown collaborated with David Morales on 1999's "Joy", which climbed to number four on the Hot Dance Music/Club Play chart.

In 2004, Brown was the lead vocalist on British act Soul Central's "Strings of Life (Stronger on My Own)" which reached number six on the UK Singles Chart and number one on the UK Dance Chart. The single was also a hit in Europe, reaching number 28 on the Eurochart. "Strings of Life" samples Rhythim Is Rhythim's 1989 house classic of the same name.

Brown's vocals animate other cuts such as "Voodoo Magic" and "Time & Time Again" with the Major Boys. Brown's rendition of "You Give Good Love" reached the Top 10 of the UK Dance Chart in August 2002. In the spring 2006 she recorded "Get Another Love", released on Defected Records. The track went on to score in the Top 10 of the BBC Radio 1 Dance Chart.

In 2008, Brown and dance outfit White Knights released "Sound of the City". The single, written by Jason Gardiner and Nick Tcherniak about Soho, London, peaked at number six on the UK Upfront Club chart.

In the fall of 2010, Brown reconnected with producer David Shaw and partner Deep Influence to produce two tracks; "Feel the Music" and "Love and Pain" on the duo's digitally distributed Kontinuous Music.

In 2023, she guested on "Stardust", the debut single by Portuguese-British singer Maya Blandy, a track produced by The Herbaliser's Jake Wherry.

== Discography ==
=== Singles ===
List of singles, with selected chart positions
Title	Year	Peak chart positions				
Title	Year	US Dance	AUS	BEL (FL)	NLD	UK
"Can't Play Around"	1993	13	—	—	—	—
"Turn Me Out" (Praxis featuring Kathy Brown)	1994	1	67	—	—	35
"I Appreciate"	1995	—	—	—	—	—
"Joy"	1999	4	—	—	—	63
"Happy People"	1999	—	—	—	—	—
"Love Is Not a Game" (featuring J Majik)	2000	—	—	—	—	34
"Give It Up" (featuring Eminence)	2001	—	—	—	—	—
"Over You" (featuring Warren Clarke)	2001	—	—	—	—	42
"Sooky Sooky"	2001	—	—	—	—	—
"You Give Good Love"	2002	—	—	—	—	82
"Don't Give Up"	2003	—	—	—	—	83
"Voodoo Magic" (with Major Boys)	2003	—	—	—	—	97
"Share the Blame" (featuring J Majik)	2003	—	—	—	—	77
"Never Again"	2003	—	—	—	—	81
"Strings of Life (Stronger on My Own)" (with Soul Central)	2004	—	49	24	43	6
"Time and Time Again" (featuring Major Boys)	2004	—	—	—	—	—
"Now It's Over" / "The Curse" (featuring J Majik and Wickaman)	2005	—	—	—	—	—
"Dare Me"	2006	—	—	—	—	—
"Get Another Love"	2006	—	—	—	—	—
"Crazy World"	2007	—	—	—	—	—
"Ocean Drums" (featuring Jerry Ropero and Michael Simon)	2007	—	—	—	—	—
"Light Up My Life" (with Danism)	2008	—	—	—	—	—
"Sound of the City" (vs. White Knights)	2008	—	—	—	—	—
"Feel the Music"	2010	—	—	—	—	—
"Love and Pain"	2010	—	—	—	—	—
"Compassion" (featuring Data)	2011	—	—	—	—	—
"Can't Get You Outta My Mind" (with BODÉ)	2020	—	—	—	—	—

== See also ==
- List of number-one dance hits (United States)
- List of artists who reached number one on the U.S. dance chart
