= Start to Feel =

Studio album by Cosmic Gate
- Released: 26 June 2014
- Recorded: Armada Music
- Genre: Progressive trance
- Length: 1:29:04
- Label: Armada Music
- Producer: Cosmic Gate

Cosmic Gate chronology
Back 2 the Future (2011)	Start to Feel (2014)	Wake Your Mind; Sessions 001 (2015)

Singles from Start to Feel
- 1. "Crushed" Released: 1 July 2013; 2. "So Get Up" Released: 23 September 2013; 3. "Falling Back" Released: 16 May 2014; 4. "Fair Game" Released: 20 June 2014; 5. "Telefunken" Released: 18 July 2014; 6. "Alone" Released: 10 November 2014; 7. "Going Home" Released: 9 March 2015

Start to Feel is the sixth studio album by German progressive trance duo Cosmic Gate. It was released on June 26, 2014 through Armada Music.

== Track listing ==
1. "Happiness" (6:21)
2. "Falling Back" (4:39) (with Eric Lumiere)
3. "Fair Game" (4:56) (with Ørjan Nilsen)
4. "Alone" (4:51) (with Kristina Antuna)
5. "No One Can Touch You Now" (5:49) (with Mike Schmid)
6. "Telefunken" (4:39) (with Jerome Isma-Ae)
7. "Run Away" (4:57) (with Eric Lumiere)
8. "Going Home" (4:33) (with Emma Hewitt)
9. "Sparks After the Sunset" (4:02) (with Sarah Lynn)
10. "Yai" (5:41)
11. "So Get Up" featuring Ithaka) (4:26)
12. "Try" (4:19) (with Jaren)
13. "Start to Feel" (5:45) (with Cary Brothers)
14. "Shine Forever" (5:32) (with Alexander Popov and Jannika)
15. "Crushed" (4:54)
16. "Tormenta" (4:43) (with KhoMha)
17. "Falling Back" (Radio Edit) (3:39) (with Eric Lumiere) iTunes bonus track
18. "All My Life" (5:11) (with Jonathan Mendelsohn) iTunes bonus track

== Charts ==
Chart (2014)	Peak position
Dutch Albums (Album Top 100)	21
