= Fire Wire (song) =

2001 single by Cosmic Gate

Fire Wire is the 5th single released by the German trance duo Cosmic Gate.

Released in 2001, Fire Wire charted #9 on the UK Singles Chart, making it Cosmic Gate's best-selling single to date. It was included on their 2001 album Rhythm & Drums as track #3. Fire Wire was remixed by other DJs such as DJ Scott, Klubdoctorz and others.

In 2011, Fire Wire was remixed by Cosmic Gate, Rank 1, Wippenberg, Dimitri Vegas & Like Mike and DJ Delicious in Cosmic Gate's remix album Back 2 The Future.

== Charts ==
Chart (2001)	Peak position
UK Dance (OCC)	3
UK Singles (OCC)	9
