= Soul Central =

British music production duo

Soul Central are a British music production duo consisting of Matt McKillop and Paul Timothy.

== Biography ==
The group originally found success in 2005 with "Strings of Life (Stronger on My Own)" on the UK Singles Chart, a cover of "Strings of Life" by Derrick May. It also reached number 1 on the UK Dance Chart. The track featured vocals from house singer Kathy Brown and was produced by Andy Ward and Paul Timothy, achieving a number through Defected Records. The Danny Krivitt re-edit also appeared on the Ministry of Sound compilation album, The Annual 2005. Their re-interpretation “Strings of Life / Un Amore Supremo” was described by 909Originals as putting "a truly unique stamp" on the techno classic. A Balearic version of the track made its debut on BBC Radio 1.

The follow-up single "Need You Now" was an instrumental, and failed to match the success of the previous single, peaking at number 109 in the UK.

In May 2006, Soul Central released "In-Ten-City", a single promoted by Pete Tong on his BBC Radio 1 show. The track was released by the record company Soul Heaven/Defected and featured Billie on vocals. The song's title appeared to pay tribute to the Chicago, Illinois-based R&B and house-music act "Ten City" (derived from intensity).

In August 2007, "Time After Time" (featuring Abigail Bailey) was released. It did not appear on the UK Singles Chart, but debuted at number 11 on the UK Indie Chart.

In 2008, Soul Central remixed "Glitter", a number-one hit song by the Japanese singer Ayumi Hamasaki. The remix appeared on her album Ayu-mi-x 6: Gold.

In 2019, Soul Central released "Un Amore Supremo", a Balearic single featuring production and writing credits for Paul Timothy and Matt McKillop. The track later formed the foundation for "Strings Of Life / Un Amore Supremo", combining the two works and further elevating the single's profile.

In 2020, subsequent tracks released digitally and on vinyl include "The Destroyer", as featured by Graeme Park on the live stream Hacienda House Party 2, with Kevin Saunderson, Arthur Baker, and Louie Vega. "Pimp Life EP" was the duo's formative vinyl release for the newly launched Electric Shrine label, exclusive to Juno music and followed by another 2 limited edition EP's. Digital originals followed with "Ice Queen" and "What Ya Gonna Do", complementing their remix of Ken 45 - Your Body which lent into the NU Disco and Indie Dance scene.

The duo participated in a live orchestral performance of “The Destroyer”, while continuing to appear at festivals and hotspots such as Café Del Mar and Pikes Ibiza for the iconic Back To Mine series. In 2023, Soul Central received a Grammy nomination for their release on DJ Spen’s Quantize Recordings, collaborating with Crystal Waters and Robin S on “Love One Another.”

== Discography ==
=== Singles ===
List of singles, with selected chart positions
Title	Year	Peak chart positions	
Title	Year	UK	AUS
"Strings of Life"	2004	86	—
"Strings of Life (Stronger on My Own)" (featuring Kathy Brown)	2005	6	49
"Need You Now"	2006	109	—
"In-Ten-City" (featuring Billie)	2006	—	—
"Time After Time" (featuring Abigail Bailey)	2007	—	—
"Un Amore Supremo"	2019	—	—
