= Joe Smooth =

American music producer and DJ

Joseph Lorenzo Jr. Welbon (born May 9, 1963), known by the stage name Joe Smooth, is an American house music DJ and Record producer, who gained international acclaim during the early 1980s. By the new millennium he held the reputation of working with acts like Destiny's Child, Ludacris, New Order, Whitney Houston, and many others across genres. He is often credited as essential to the creation of house music as a genre, with co-production of the Chip E "Jack Trax" EP, and became an influence to major groups like Daft Punk, who often played Joe Smooth's music during early live shows.

Joe Smooth has earned gold and platinum record awards for his work. In 2015 he started his own record label, Indie Art Music, focusing on producing music in all genres and all areas of the music industry. In 2023 the label merged with the Atlantic Traxx Group run by legendary industry music manager and A&R Michael Hague to form IAM TRAXX which will continue the original label's ethics of releasing quality dance and electronic music of all genres from both major and upcoming artists worldwide.

== Biography ==
=== Early life ===
Joe Smooth is a self-taught musician and started creating original music at the age of 12. During his teenage years, he began to make a name for himself as a DJ in the underground Chicago music scene. He is credited as essential to the creation of house music as a genre and the support of the culture surrounding it. During his 20s he became an essential DJ for Smart Bar from 1983 to 1985 at which point he became main dj and musical director at Limelight and Charlie Club in Chicago. In 1990 Joe Smooth opened the second iteration of The Warehouse with partners Julian Jumpin Perez and Rocky Jones of DJ International.

=== Career ===
Joe Smooth gained international acclaim with the release of his late 1980s tracks "Promised Land" (featuring Anthony Thomas), "They Want to be Free," (featuring Joe Smooth on vocals) a song commissioned by CNN and Nelson Mandela's support team to be played in the background of his televised release from prison." He is best known for "Promised Land," which is considered one of the top house records of all time and spoke of how humans, as brothers and sisters, should unite in love and thrive in paradise. Joe Smooth's song has been covered several times and is still played today. Originally released in 1987, it peaked at No. 56 in the UK Singles Chart in February 1989, following the Top 40 success of a cover version by The Style Council. An album of the same title became available in 1988, and a music video was produced for the single. A follow-up album, Rejoice, was released in 1990, which featured the hit single "They Want to be Free."

Joe Smooth helped influence a decade of house and dance music elements in mainstream pop throughout the 1990s.

By the new millennium he was approached to work with many pop, R&B, and other genre icons such as Destiny's Child, Whitney Houston, and Cisqo.

In October 2004, "Promised Land" appeared in the video game Grand Theft Auto: San Andreas. Within the game, the song could be heard playing on the fictional House Music radio station SF-UR.

He later launched his own record label Indie Art Music. The label works with notable producers and artists from all over the globe including George Clinton amongst others. Indie Art Music set out with the goal of creating mainstream music in all genres with the ability to distribute, market, publish, and produce all within one single company. While the focus is on mainstream areas of the industry, Indie Art Music developed and worked with new artists like Amy DB of Chicago, Greg Tanoose of Austin, among others. Merging in 2023 with the Atlantic Traxx Group run by legendary industry music manager and A&R Michael Hague to form IAM TRAXX the joint label continues the original label's ethics of releasing quality dance and electronic music of all genres from both major and upcoming artists worldwide. In 2023 he formed a joint partnership with Michael Hague's established Angel Artists management company (Goldie, Foxy Brown, Tyra Banks, Tyree, Mark Picchiotti, Man Parrish, Bobby 'O', Beatmasters, The Grid as well as several Oscar, Grammy and Brit award winning artists), forming artist/music management company I.A.M Management representing and working with a plethora of artists side by side with various Grammy award winning producers and artists along with an extensive list of various industry contacts of both Joe and Michael's to make sure their clients get the best out of their careers.

=== Current work ===
Joe Smooth is a musician and producer, who has worked as a remixer, producer, engineer, and writer. He has earned gold and platinum record awards for his work, work behind the scenes with Grammy award-winning artists. Notable artists he has worked with include Bros, Whitney Houston, Donnell Jones, Destiny's Child, Sisqó, Frankie Knuckles, Marshall Jefferson, A Guy Called Gerald, Lil Louis, D'Bora, Tyree Cooper, Fast Eddie, Fingers Inc., Art of Noise, Sterling Void, Pet Shop Boys, Janet Jackson, the Style Council, New Order, and Steve Hurley. He launched a record label in 2015, Indie Art Music which merged with the Atlantic Traxx Group in 2023 forming IAM Traxx, and has topped digital charts Traxsource and Beatport for song sales. As well as working as Joe Smooth, he also works as Smooth Angel with Mike Angel on productions and remixes focusing on a US and UK mix for each commission and their own releases.
