= Weller at the BBC =

Musical compilation

Compilation album by Paul Weller
- Released: 3 November 2008
- Recorded: 1990–2008
- Genres: Rock, Indie
- Label: Universal Records
- Producer: Various

Paul Weller chronology
22 Dreams (2008)	Weller at the BBC (2008)	Just a Dream - 22 Dreams Live (2009)

Weller at the BBC is a 2008 live compilation of Paul Weller's BBC performances recorded between 1990 and 2008. Four physical versions were released: a 4-disc CD box set, a 2-disc CD set of highlights, 3-disc LP set and a DVD-Video plus a 13-disc download-only version with 188 tracks from iTunes.

== Track listing ==
=== 4-disc box set ===
Disc 1:

1. Fly on the Wall (Johnnie Walker – Live 5.9.92)
2. Pink on White Walls
3. Amongst Butterflies
4. Wild Wood (Saturday Sequence – Johnnie Walker – 2.10.93)
5. Hung Up
6. Out of the Sinking (band version)
7. Clues
8. Whirlpools' End (Lunchtime Show – Emma Freud – 26.10.94)
9. Out of the Sinking (acoustic version) (Lunchtime Show – 1.11.1994)
10. Broken Stones (band version)
11. Time Passes
12. The Changingman
13. I Walk on Gilded Splinters (Evening Session – 8.5.95)
14. Broken Stones (acoustic version)
15. You Do Something To Me (Simon Mayo – 12.9.95)
16. Brushed
17. Peacock Suit
18. Up in Suzes' Room
19. Friday Street
20. Mermaids
21. The Poacher (Evening Session Live – 10.6.97)

Disc 2:

1. Driving Nowhere (Mark Goodier – 23.11.97)
2. Friday Street (acoustic version) (BBC Radio 4 Kaleidoscope – Live in the Studio 19.9. 97)
3. Science (BBC Radio 1 Jo Wiley – 1997)
4. Wishing on a Star
5. Thinking of You (BBC Radio 2 The Drivetime Show With Johnnie Walker – 1.9.04)
6. Corrina, Corrina
7. Early Morning Rain
8. Foot of the Mountain (Mark Lamarr For Jonathan Ross – 8.1.05)
9. To The Start of Forever
10. Out of the Sinking (BBC Radio 2 Janice Long – 4.3.05)
11. Paper Smile
12. Come On/Let's Go (The Drivetime Show With Stuart Maconie – 28.7.05)
13. Amongst Butterflies
14. Frightened
15. That's Entertainment (Mark Lamarr: Sold on Song – 11.2.06)
16. All I Wanna Do (Is Be With You)
17. Cold Moments
18. Push It Along
19. Pretty Flamingo (Mark Lamarr: God's Jukebox – 5.7.08)

Disc 3:

1. My Ever Changing Moods (Town and Country Club 05.12.1990)
2. A Man of Great Promise (Town and Country Club 05.12.1990)
3. Kosmos (Town and Country Club 05.12.1990)
4. Speak Like a Child (Town and Country Club 05.12.1990)
5. Just Like Yesterday (Town and Country Club 05.12.1990)
6. Work To Do (Town and Country Club 05.12.1990)
7. Pity Poor Alfie (Town and Country Club 05.12.1990)
8. What's Goin On (London Royal Albert Hall 13.10.1992)
9. Uh Huh Oh Yeh! (Always There To Fool You!) (London Royal Albert Hall 13.10.1992)
10. Hercules (London Royal Albert Hall 13.10.1992)
11. Bull-Rush / Magic Bus (London Royal Albert Hall 13.10.1992)
12. Above The Clouds (London Royal Albert Hall 13.10.1992)
13. Everything Has A Price To Pay (London Royal Albert Hall 13.10.1992)
14. Headstart For Happiness (London Royal Albert Hall 13.10.1992)
15. Into Tomorrow (London Royal Albert Hall 13.10.1992)
16. Porcelain Gods (Phoenix Festival 13.07.1995)
17. Stanley Road (Phoenix Festival 13.07.1995)
18. Can You Heal Us (Holy Man) (Phoenix Festival 13.07.1995)

Disc 4:

1. Shadow of the Sun (Phoenix Festival 13.07.1995)
2. I Walk on Gilded Splinters w/ Noel Gallagher (Phoenix Festival 13.07.1995)
3. Out of the Sinking (Finsbury Park 09.06.1996)
4. Hung Up (Finsbury Park 09.06.1996)
5. Sunflower (Finsbury Park 09.06.1996)
6. Broken Stones (Finsbury Park 09.06.1996)
7. Fly on the Wall (Finsbury Park 09.06.1996)
8. Tales From the Riverbank (Finsbury Park 09.06.1996)
9. Peacock Suit (London Victoria Park 08.08.1998)
10. Heavy Soul (London Victoria Park 08.08.1998)
11. Science (London Victoria Park 08.08.1998)
12. I Didn't Mean To Hurt You (BBC Radio Theatre 09.11.1998)
13. Brand New Start (BBC Radio Theatre 09.11.1998)
14. Wild Wood (BBC Radio Theatre 09.11.1998)
15. Friday Street (BBC Radio Theatre 09.11.1998)
16. The Changingman (BBC Radio Theatre 09.11.1998)

=== 2-disc Highlights ===
Disc 1:

1. Fly on the Wall
2. Wild Wood
3. Hung Up
4. Clues
5. Out of the Sinking
6. Broken Stones
7. You Do Something To Me
8. Brushed
9. Peacock Suit
10. The Poacher
11. Driving Nowhere
12. Friday Street
13. Thinking of You
14. Corrina, Corrina
15. Early Morning Rain
16. To The Start of Forever
17. Come On/Let's Go
18. Amongst Butterflies
19. That's Entertainment
20. All I Wanna Do (Is Be With You)
21. Push It Along
22. Pretty Flamingo

Disc 2:

1. My Ever Changing Moods (Town and Country Club 05.12.1990)
2. Kosmos (Town and Country Club 05.12.1990)
3. Just Like Yesterday (Town and Country Club 05.12.1990)
4. What's Goin On (London Royal Albert Hall 13.10.1992)
5. Everything Has A Price To Pay (London Royal Albert Hall 13.10.1992)
6. Headstart For Happiness (London Royal Albert Hall 13.10.1992)
7. Into Tomorrow (London Royal Albert Hall 13.10.1992)
8. Can You Heal Us (Holy Man) (Phoenix Festival 13.07.1995)
9. Shadow of the Sun (Phoenix Festival 13.07.1995)
10. I Walk on Gilded Splinters w/ Noel Gallagher (Phoenix Festival 13.07.1995)
11. Sunflower (Finsbury Park 09.06.1996)
12. Tales From The Riverbank (Finsbury Park 09.06.1996)
13. Peacock Suit (London Victoria Park 08.08.1998)
14. Science (London Victoria Park 08.08.1998)
15. I Didn't Mean To Hurt You (BBC Radio Theatre 09.11.1998)
16. Brand New Start (BBC Radio Theatre 09.11.1998)
17. The Changingman (BBC Radio Theatre 09.11.1998)

=== DVD-Video ===
Later with Jools Holland
No.	Title	Length
1.	"Sunflower"
2.	"Has My Fire Really Gone Out?"
3.	"You Do Something To Me"
4.	"I Should Have Been There To Inspire You"
5.	"Heavy Soul"
6.	"Picking Up Sticks"
7.	"From The Floorboards Up"
8.	"Savages"
9.	"Come On/ Let's Go"
10.	"Push It Along"
11.	"22 Dreams"

Later Presents Paul Weller in Concert
No.	Title	Length
1.	"Out of the Sinking"
2.	"Broken Stones"
3.	"Porcelain Gods"
4.	"Wild Wood"
5.	"Takes From The Riverbank"
6.	"Foot of the Mountain"
7.	"Into Tomorrow"

BBC Electric Proms
No.	Title	Length
1.	"Blink And You'll Miss It"
2.	"From The Floorboards Up"
3.	"Don't Go To Strangers"
4.	"Porcelain Gods/ I Walk on Gilded Splinters"
5.	"In The City"
6.	"Wild Blue Yonder"
7.	"Down in the Tube Station at Midnight"
8.	"Broken Stones"
9.	"Town Called Malice"

Top of the Pops
No.	Title	Length
1.	"Uh Huh Oh Yeh"
2.	"The Changingman"
3.	"Peacock Suit"
4.	"Mermaids"
5.	"From The Floorboards Up"
6.	"Town Called Malice"

=== 13-Disc Digital Download Edition ===
Disc 1: Various Radio Sessions Volume 1
No.	Title	Length
1.	"Fly on the Wall (Johnnie Walker – Live 5.9.92.)"	3:32
2.	"Pink on White Walls (Saturday Sequence – Johnnie Walker – Transmitted 2.10.93)"	2:46
3.	"Foot of the Mountain (Johnnie Walker – Transmitted 2.10.93)"	3:36
4.	"Amongst Butterflies (Saturday Sequence – Johnnie Walker – Transmitted 2.10.93)"	2:31
5.	"Wild Wood (Saturday Sequence – Johnnie Walker – Transmitted 2.10.93. .)"	3:34
6.	"Hung Up (Lunchtime Show – Emma Freud – Transmitted 26.10.94.)"	2:59
7.	"Out of the Sinking (Lunchtime Show – Emma Freud – Transmitted 26.10.94.)"	3:47
8.	"Clues (Lunchtime Show – Emma Freud – Transmitted 26.10.94.)"	3:55
9.	"Whirlpools' End (Lunchtime Show – Emma Freud – Transmitted 26.10.94.)"	6:50
10.	"Hung Up (Lunch Time Show – 1.11.94)"	2:57
11.	"Black Sheep Boy (Lunch Time Show – 1.11.94)"	2:07
12.	"Out of the Sinking (Lunch Time Show – 1.11.94)"	3:27
13.	"Wild Wood (Lunch Time Show – 1.11.94)"	3:34
14.	"Broken Stones (Evening Session – Transmitted 8/5/1995 Recorded 26 April 1995)"
15.	"Woodcutter's Son (BBC Radio One's The Evening Session Version)"	4:15
16.	"My Whole World Is Falling Down (Evening Session – Recorded 26.4.95 Transmitted 8.5.95)"	3:43
17.	"Time Passes (Evening Session – Transmitted 8/5/1995 Recorded 26 April 1995)"	4:15
18.	"The Changingman (Evening Session – Transmitted 8/5/1995 Recorded 26 April 1995)"	3:46
19.	"I Walk on Gilded Splinters (Evening Session – Transmitted 8/5/1995 Recorded 26 April 1995)"	3:21

Disc 2

1. Reason to Believe (Gary Crowley Greater London Radio 16 May 1995) 2:16
2. Black Sheep Boy (Gary Crowley Greater London Radio 16 May 1995) 2:12
3. Fly on the Wall (Gary Crowley Greater London Radio 16 May 1995) 3:30
4. Broken Stones (Simon Mayo – Recorded 31 August 1995 Transmitted 8/5/1995) 2:29
5. You Do Something to Me (Simon Mayo – Recorded 31 August 1995 Transmitted 8/5/1995) 3:23
6. Porcelain Gods (Gary Crowley Show 29 July 1996 – Greather London Radio) 5:07
7. Peacock Suit (Gary Crowley Show 29 July 1996 Greater London Radio) 3:27
8. All the Pictures on the Wall (Gary Crowley Show 29 July 1996 – Greather London Radio) 3:47
9. Foot of the Mountain (Gary Crowley Greater London Radio 29 July 1996) 4:52
10. Up in Suzes' Room (Gary Crowley Show 29 July 1996 – Greather London Radio) 4:26
11. The Circle (Gary Crowley Show 29 July 1996 – Greather London Radio) 2:31
12. Driving Nowhere (Gary Crowley Show 29 July 1996 – Greather London Radio) 2:58
13. I Shall Be Released (Gary Crowley Show 29 July 1996 – Greather London Radio) 3:02
14. As You Lean into the Light (Greater London Radio 24 April 1997) 2:45
15. Brushed (Evening Session – Live 10/6/1997) 3:46
16. Peacock Suit (Evening Session – Live 10/6/1997) 3:04
17. Up in Suzes' Room (Evening Session – Live 10/6/1997) 4:35
18. Friday Street (Evening Session – Live 10/6/1997) 2:30
19. Mermaids (Evening Session – Live 10/6/1997) 3:12
20. The Poacher (Evening Session – Live 10/6/1997) 3:15
21. Heavy Soul, Pt. 1 & 2 (Evening Session – Live 10/6/1997) 7:42

Disc 3

1. Driving Nowhere (Mark Goodier – Transmitted 23 November 1997) 2:49
2. Waiting on an Angel (Mark Goodier Transmitted 23.11.97) 3:58
3. Friday Street (Kaledoscope Live in the Studio 19 September 1997) 2:30
4. Science (Jo Whiley Recorded 1997) 3:34
5. Wishing on a Star (The Drivetime Show With Johnnie Walker Date 1/9/2004) 3:29
6. Thinking of You (The Drivetime Show With Johnnie Walker Date 1/9/2004) 3:10
7. Corrina, Corrina (Mark Lamarr For Jonathan Ross 8/1/2005) 2:26
8. Early Morning Rain (Mark Lamarr For Jonathan Ross 8/1/2005) 3:59
9. Foot of the Mountain (Mark Lamarr For Jonathan Ross 8/1/2005) 3:20
10. Early Morning Rain (Janice Long 4/3/2005) 3:49
11. To the Start of Forever (Janice Long 4/3/2005) 4:24
12. Out of the Sinking (Janice Long 4/3/2005) 3:07
13. Paper Smile (The Drivetime Show With Stuart Maconie) 3:01
14. Come On / Let's Go (The Drivetime Show With Stuart Maconie) 3:00
15. Roll Along Summer (Jonathan Ross 10/6/2006) 3:42
16. I Wanna Make It Alright (Jonathan Ross 10/6/2006) 3:35
17. All I Wanna Do (Is Be With You) 4:07
18. Cold Moments (Mark Lamarr – God's Jukebox 5/7/2008) 4:56
19. Push It Along (Mark Lamarr – God's Jukebox 5/7/2008) 2:48
20. Pretty Flamingo (Mark Lamarr – God's Jukebox 5/7/2008) 2:41

Disc 4 – London Town and Country Club 05.12.1990

1. My Ever Changing Moods 5:50
2. A Man of Great Promise 2:25
3. Round & Round 4:41
4. Kosmos 6:43
5. Homebreakers 5:49
6. The Strange Museum 3:29
7. The Whole Point II 2:43
8. Speak Like a Child 2:56
9. Just Like Yesterday 5:35
10. Precious 3:54
11. Headstart for Happiness 3:22
12. Work to Do 2:55
13. Pity Poor Alfie 3:22

Disc 5 – London Royal Albert Hall 13.10.1992 Disc 1

1. What's Goin On? 4:00
2. Uh Huh Oh Yeh! (Always There to Fool You!) 3:35
3. Man in the Corner Shop 3:22
4. (When You) Call Me 3:31
5. Hercules 4:05
6. Bull-Rush / Magic Bus 5:12
7. Round & Round 4:04
8. Above the Clouds 4:00
9. Arrival Time 8:27
10. Everything Has a Price to Pay 3:34

Disc 6: – London Royal Albert Hall 13.10.1992 (Disc 2)
No.	Title	Length
1.	"Fly on the Wall"	3:43
2.	"Clues"	4:25
3.	"Amongst Butterflies"	2:33
4.	"Headstart for Happiness"	3:25
5.	"Ohio"	3:27
6.	"Into Tomorrow"	3:18
7.	"I Didn't Mean to Hurt You"	4:11
8.	"Long Hot Summer"	5:22
9.	"Bitterness Rising"	6:07
10.	"All Year Round"	5:00
11.	"Kosmos"	5:57

Disc 7 – Phoenix Festival 13.07.1995

1. The Changingman 3:59
2. Hung Up 2:44
3. Has My Fire Really Gone Out? 3:44
4. Whirlpools' End 6:04
5. Uh Huh Oh Yeh! 3:09
6. Out of the Sinking 3:43
7. I Didn't Mean to Hurt You 3:55
8. Porcelain Gods 6:40
9. Stanley Road 4:12
10. You Do Something to Me 3:33
11. Can You Heal Us (Holy Man) 4:05
12. Shadow of the Sun 8:42
13. Sunflower 3:58
14. Into Tomorrow 3:15
15. Broken Stones 3:07
16. Woodcutter's Son 5:41
17. The Swamp Song feat. Noel Gallagher 2:46
18. I Walk on Gilded Splinters feat. Noel Gallagher 3:58

Disc 8 – London Finsbury Park 09.06.1996

1. The Changingman 3:56
2. I Walk on Gilded Splinters 4:18
3. Out of the Sinking 3:32
4. Hung Up 2:41
5. Sunflower 4:02
6. Broken Stones 3:26
7. Fly on the Wall 3:19
8. Wild Wood 3:33
9. Tales from the Riverbank 3:22
10. Foot of the Mountain 5:04
11. You Do Something to Me 3:32
12. Can You Heal Us (Holy Man) 4:08
13. Woodcutter's Son 5:30
14. Whirlpools' End 7:48

Disc 9 – Cardiff 11.05.1997

1. I Walk on Gilded Splinters 4:19
2. Peacock Suit 2:55
3. Porcelain Gods 7:00
4. Heavy Soul 7:10
5. Broken Stones 3:21
6. Friday Street 2:26
7. The Changingman 3:30
8. Woodcutter's Son 6:06
9. Mermaids 3:06
10. Sunflower 4:01
11. Into Tomorrow 3:22

Disc 10 – London Victoria Park 08.08.1998
Tracks 1, 2, 3, 4, 5, 6, 8, 10, 11, 12, 13, 14 and 17 were previously released as part of Modern Greats the best of Paul Weller in 1998 on the bonus Live CD Live Classics. Also broadcast as a highlights set on Lamacq Live.

1. Into Tomorrow 3:30
2. Peacock Suit 2:58
3. Friday Street 2:22
4. Mermaids 3:10
5. Sunflower 4:00
6. Out of the Sinking 3:37
7. Science 3:54
8. Heavy Soul 8:09
9. As You Lean into the Light 2:59
10. Wild Wood 3:43
11. Up in Suzes' Room 4:42
12. Can You Heal Us (Holy Man)
13. The Changingman 3:34
14. Porcelain Gods 5:26
15. Woodcutter's Son 5:23
16. I Walk on Gilded Splinters w/ Noel Gallagher 4:21
17. Broken Stones 3:44

Disc 11: – BBC Radio Theatre 09.11.1998 (Lamacq Live)
No.	Title	Length
1.	"Into Tomorrow"	3:41
2.	"Out of the Sinking"	3:56
3.	"I Didn't Mean to Hurt You"	4:12
4.	"Heavy Soul"	5:20
5.	"Can You Heal Us (Holy Man)"	4:38
6.	"Brand New Start"	4:13
7.	"Wild Wood"	3:49
8.	"Friday Street"	2:21
9.	"Mermaids"	3:01
10.	"The Changingman"	3:42
11.	"Porcelain Gods"	5:55
12.	"Broken Stones"	3:40

Disc 12: BBC Radio Theatre 2000.
No.	Title	Length
1.	"He's The Keeper"	5:00
2.	"Frightened"	4:06
3.	"Back in the Fire"	4:49
4.	"There Is No Drinking, After You're Dead"	4:49
5.	"Stanley Road"	3:57
6.	"You Do Something To Me"	3:54
7.	"Sweet Pea, My Sweet Pea"	4:28
8.	"With Time and Temperance"	5:50
9.	"Picking Up Sticks"	5:05
10.	"Love-Less"	5:35
11.	"Sunflower"	4:07
12.	"Woodcutter's Sun"

Disc 13: Sold On Song 11.02.2006 recorded for Radio 2 as Paul received Lifetime Achievement Award at the BRIT Awards.
No.	Title	Length
1.	"Hung Up"	3:01
2.	"Wild Wood"	4:08
3.	"English Rose"	1:25
4.	"Rolling Along Summer"	3:22
5.	"Let It Be Me"	3:21
6.	"Back in the Fire (Clip)"	0:48
7.	"Amongst Butterflies"	2:51
8.	"Frightened"	4:22
9.	"To the Start of Forever"	3:55
10.	"That's Entertainment"	3:28
