= Lenzman =

Dutch drum and bass producer (1978/1979–2026)

- Born: Teije van Vliet; 1978 or 1979; Leiden, Netherlands
- Died: 11 July 2026 (aged 47)
- Genres: Drum and bass; Liquid Funk
- Occupations: DJ; record producer; musician; record label owner
- Years active: 2007–2026
- Labels: The North Quarter; Metalheadz
- Website: thenorthquarter.nl

Teije van Vliet (1978 or 1979 – 11 July 2026), better known by the stage name of Lenzman, was a Dutch drum and bass producer who was signed to Metalheadz. In 2016 he launched his own record label, The North Quarter, which has released music by himself, Redeyes, and FD.

His musical style can generally be categorized under the Liquid Funk subgenre. On one occasion, he incorporated 1990s Hip Hop into drum and bass.

Lenzman's remix of the Children of Zeus song Still Standing was voted as Best Remix at the 2016 Drum & Bass Arena awards.

Lenzman was diagnosed with terminal kidney cancer in January 2023. He died on 11 July 2026 at the age of 47.

== Discography ==
=== Albums ===
- Looking At The Stars (2014)
- Golden Age EP (2016)
- All for You (2016)
- Earth Tones (2017)
- Bobby (2019)
- A Little While Longer (2021)

=== Singles ===
- No More Tears [with Switch] / Allure (Phuzion, 2007)
- I Want You / Close To me (Future Retro, 2007)
- Caught Up / The Blues (Spearhead, 2007)
- Respiration [with Submorphics] / Way Back When [with Submorphics] (Phunkfiction, 2008)
- String City (Fokuz, 2008)
- Ever So Slightly / Little Brother (Integral, 2008)
- Bright Lights / Last Day On Earth (Spearhead, 2009)
- Lonely Heart (Nu-Directions, 2009)
- Lose You [featuring Cliff] / Bear Trap [with Treez] (C.I.A. Deep Kut, 2009)
- High & Low [with Redeyes] / Thieves In The Night [with Redeyes] (Integral, 2009)
- Emeralds [featuring Jo-S] / Mesmerized (SGN:LTD, 2009)
- Sugar Hill / Memory Loss (C.I.A. Deep Kut, 2009)
- Bittersweet [featuring Riya] / Rags To Riches (SGN:LTD, 2010)
- More Than I Can Take / Silhouette (Critical Modulations, 2010)
- Fade Away [featuring Jo-S] / Flamethrower (Soul:R, 2010)
- Open Page [featuring Riya] / Coincidence [featuring Jo-S] (Metalheadz, 2010)
- Bittersweet Part 2 [featuring Riya] / Take It Back (SGN:LTD)
- Ice Cold Soul [with Switch] / Lose You VIP [featuring Cliff] (C.I.A. Records, 2011)
- Stellar [with Treez, featuring Jo-S) / Stuck (Subtitles Recordings, 2011)
- Masquerade / Masquerade (DJ Die, Interface & William Cartwright Remix) (Metalheadz Platinum, 2011)
- Narrow Margin [with Total Science and S.P.Y] (Subtitles Recordings, 2011)
- Lasers / Broken Dreams (Metalheadz, 2011)
- How Did I Let U Go [featuring Riya] / Wordsworth (Metalheadz, 2012)
- Catharsis [with Ulterior Motive] (Subtitles Recordings 2012)
- Empty Promise / Broken Dreams (Makoto Remix) (Metalheadz, 2013)
- My Tearz / Paper Faces (Metalheadz, 2014)
- Ever So Slightly (Artificial Intelligence Remix) / Clouded Judgement (Integral Records, 2014)
- Suggestions EP (with Random Movement & Kasper) (Fokuz Recordings, 2016)
- Golden Age EP (Metalheadz, 2016)
- All For You EP (The North Quarter, 2016)
- In My Mind [featuring IAMDDB] (The North Quarter, 2017)

=== Remixes ===
- BCee & Lomax - "Can't Say No" (Spearhead, 2008)
- BCee "Glitter Balls" (Spearhead, 2009)
- Madmen & Poets "Afraid Of Jazz" (Phunkfiction, 2009)
- Total Science featuring MC Conrad "Soul Patrol" (C.I.A. Records, 2009)
- Bachelors Of Science "The Ice Dance" (Horizons Music, 2010)
- Pendulum "The Island (Pendulum song)" (Warner Music UK / Breakbeat Kaos, 2010)
- DJ Die & Interface featuring William Cartwright "Bright Lights" (Clear Skyz / Toolroom Records, 2010)
- Heavy1 "Xiphactinus" (Demand Records, 2011)
- Delilah (musician) "Love You So" (Warner Music UK, 2011)
- Natalie Duncan "Sky Is Falling" (Verve Records, 2012)
- Total Science & S.P.Y featuring Kevin King "Past Lives" (C.I.A. Records, 2012)
- Alex Clare "Treading Water" (Island Records, 2012)
- Shapeshifter (band) "Gravity" (Truetone Recordings, 2013)
- Ever So Slightly (with Phil Tangent, Artificial Intelligence Remix) / Clouded Judgement (Integral, 2014)
- Ice Cold Soul / Conversations (Remixes) (C.I.A. Records, 2014)
- LSB "Hurting" (Spearhead Records, 2015)
- Artificial Intelligence "What You Had" (Metalheadz, 2015)
- Calculon & Dave Owen feat. Christina Tamayo "Ben Carlos" (Rubik Records, 2015)
- Random Movement "I Stayed Around" (Fokuz Recordings, 2016)
- Submorphics "Burning Love" (V Records, 2016)
- Children of Zeus feat. DRS "Still Standing" (The North Quarter, 2016)
- Ulterior Motive "Stay" feat. James Sunderland (The Fourth Wall Remix EP, 2016)
- Macca & Loz Contreras "Better World" (Fokuz Recordings - 2017 Recap, 2017)
- Redeyes "What She Wants" (Modern Soul 3 LP Sampler, 2017)
- Amy Steele "The Wolves" (Mixtape Collection Vol 13, 2017)
- Calculon & Dave Owen "Ben Carlos" (The Rubik Files Vol. 1, 2018)
- BCee feat. Thomas Oliver "Black Sky" (Northpoint Remixes, 2018)
- T.R.A.C. feat. Submorphics "Higher Ground" (Life in Motion. 2018)
- Tali, Roy Green & Protone "Paper Wasp" (Fokuz Recap 2019, 2019)
- Ill Truth & Satl feat. Charli Brix "In Your Soul" (Summetry Vol. 1, 2019)
- Azekel "Don't Wake the Babies" (Quarter To Quarter, 2020)
- Goldie "The Ballad Celeste" (Metalheadz, 2020)
- Redeyes "Late Night Jam" (The North Quarter, 2020)

=== Production ===
- MC DRS – "Holding On" (Soul:R, 2012)
- MC DRS – "Raindrops" (Soul:R, 2012)
