= FabricLive.25 =

Compilation album by High Contrast
- Released: December 2005
- Label: Fabric
- Producer: High Contrast

High Contrast chronology
High Society (2004)	FabricLive.25 (2005)	Tough Guys Don't Dance (2007)

FabricLive chronology
FabricLive.24 (2005)	FabricLive.25 (2005)	FabricLive.26 (2006)

FabricLive.25 is a DJ mix compilation album by High Contrast, as part of the FabricLive Mix Series.

== Track listing ==
1. Adam F - 8Ball - Breakbeat Kaos
2. London Elektricity - Power Ballad - Hospital Records
3. DJ Marky, Bungle & DJ Roots - Restart - Innerground Records
4. Logistics - Life Rhythm - Hospital Records
5. Cyantific Vs Logistics - Flashback - Hospital Records
6. Funky Technicians - Desperate Housewives - Advanced Recordings
7. Martyn - Nxt 2 u - Play:musik
8. Cyantific - Ghetto Blaster - Hospital Records
9. Jenna G - Woe - Bingo Beats
10. Matrix Vs Futurebound - Strength 2 Strength - Metro Recordings/Viper Recordings
11. Artificial Intelligence - The Big Picture - Widescreen Recordings
12. Craggz And Parallel Forces - Love Insane - Valve Recordings
13. Danny Byrd - Soul Function - Hospital Records
14. Blame - Solar Burn - Charge Recordings
15. Logistics - Summer Sun - Hospital Records
16. Chris S.U. & SKC - What's Happening? - Hospital Records
17. State Of Mind - Real McCoy - CIA Records
18. Nero - Bitch I'm Gone - Formation Records
19. Total Science - Going In Circles (A.I. Remix) - CIA Records
20. Klute - Hell Hath No Fury - Commercial Suicide
21. Sparfunk & Joe Solo - Rapture - Ram Records
22. High Contrast - Days Go By - The Contrast
