= Recognise (album) =

Studio album by Fred V & Grafix
- Released: 31 March 2014
- Genre: Drum and bass; house
- Length: 57:53
- Label: Hospital
- Producer: Fred V; Grafix; Panda

Fred V & Grafix chronology
Recognise (2014)	Oxygen (2016)

Singles from Recognise
- 1. "Recognise" Released: 17 March 2014; 2. "Forest Fires" Released: 16 June 2014

Recognise is the debut studio album by British drum and bass production duo Fred V & Grafix. It was released on 31 March 2014 by Hospital Records. It entered the UK Albums Chart at number 106.

A remix album, entitled Unrecognisable, was released on 24 November 2014. It includes the new original track "3D Glasses". "Hydra (Chords Remix)" was released on Beatport in advance as a promotional single from the album.

== Singles ==
"Catch My Breath" (featuring Kate Westall) was first released as part of Hospital Records' We Are 18 compilation, released on 27 January 2014.

The album's lead single "Recognise" was released on 17 March 2014, two weeks before the album. It failed to chart but received airplay on BBC Radio 1. The album's second single, "Forest Fires", features vocals from drum and bass musician Etherwood and was released on 16 June 2014. Originally premiered by UKF, the song accumulated over 250,000 YouTube views and the official video was later posted by THUMP. The song entered the UK Singles Chart at number 77, the UK Dance Chart at number 23 and the UK Indie Chart at number 5, making it the duo's first charting single.

== Track listing ==
No.	Title	Writer(s)	Producer(s)	Length
1.	"Hydra"	Fred Vahrman; Josh Jackson	Fred V & Grafix	4:44
2.	"Maverick Souls"	Vahrman; Jackson	Fred V & Grafix	4:08
3.	"Recognise"	Vahrman; Jackson	Fred V & Grafix	5:22
4.	"Shine" (featuring Tudor)	Vahrman; Jackson; Louis Read; Tudor J Davies	Fred V & Grafix	4:09
5.	"Major Happy"	Vahrman; Jackson	Fred V & Grafix	4:25
6.	"Let Your Guard Down" (featuring Panda and Iain Horrocks)	Vahrman; Jackson; Callum Buchanan; Iain Horrocks	Fred V & Grafix; Panda	3:21
7.	"Bladerunner"	Vahrman; Jackson	Fred V & Grafix	6:03
8.	"Sick of All Your Secrets" (featuring Josie)	Vahrman; Jackson; Davies; Josie Radford	Fred V & Grafix	4:12
9.	"Catch My Breath" (featuring Kate Westall)	Vahrman; Jackson; Kate Westall	Fred V & Grafix	3:48
10.	"Forest Fires" (featuring Etherwood)	Vahrman; Jackson; Edward Allen	Fred V & Grafix	3:26
11.	"Green Destiny"	Vahrman; Jackson	Fred V & Grafix	5:13
12.	"Better Times Are Coming" (featuring Josie)	Vahrman; Jackson; Radford	Fred V & Grafix	3:48
13.	"Clouds Cross Skies"	Vahrman; Jackson	Fred V & Grafix	5:14
Total length:				57:53

Unrecognisable
No.	Title	Length
1.	"Let Your Guard Down" (featuring Panda and Iain Horrocks) (Hugh Hardie Remix)	5:10
2.	"Forest Fires" (featuring Etherwood) (Etherwood Remix)	5:37
3.	"Major Happy" (Frederic Robinson Remix)	4:33
4.	"Sick of All Your Secrets" (featuring Josie) (Logistics Remix)	4:23
5.	"Recognise" (Emperor Remix)	4:56
6.	"Better Times Are Coming" (featuring Josie) (Keeno Remix)	5:42
7.	"Hydra" (Chords Remix)	5:36
8.	"Maverick Souls" (Dan Dakota Remix)	3:38
9.	"Clouds Cross Skies" (Urbandawn Remix)	6:47
10.	"Bladerunner" (LoKo Remix)	4:49
11.	"Green Destiny" (Subwave Remix)	5:39
12.	"Forest Fires" (featuring Etherwood) (Taiki Nulight Remix)	5:06
13.	"3D Glasses"	4:34
Total length:		1:06:24

== Charts ==
Chart (2014)	Peak position
UK Albums (OCC)	106
UK Dance Albums (OCC)	11
UK Independent Albums (OCC)	21
