= Confidential (High Contrast album) =

High Contrast Confidential

Compilation album by High Contrast
- Released: 27 April 2009
- Genre: Drum and bass
- Length: 145:44
- Label: Hospital
- Producer: Lincoln Barrett

High Contrast chronology
Tough Guys Don't Dance (2007)	High Contrast Confidential (2009)	The Agony and the Ecstasy (2012)

Professional ratings
Review scores
Source	Rating
Allmusic	4/5 stars
Sputnikmusic	4/5 stars

High Contrast Confidential is the fourth album and the second double album from the Welsh drum and bass producer High Contrast, released on 27 April 2009 on the Hospital Records label. It is an assortment of handpicked songs he has written in the past. The first disc includes a premium selection of singles from his previous three albums but the second disc includes some of his remixes from the past.

The Album Art contains aspects of High Contrast's previous albums. The backdrop is the same as True Colours, he has the suit and cocktail from High Society and the phone pictured on the cover of Tough Guys Don't Dance is lying on the floor.

== Track listing ==
=== Disc 1 - The Originals ===
No.	Title	Origin	Length
1.	"Racing Green"	High Society	6:21
2.	"Return of Forever"	True Colours	8:19
3.	"If We Ever"	Tough Guys Don't Dance	5:20
4.	"Seven Notes In Black"	Non-album single	5:29
5.	"Kiss Kiss Bang Bang"	Tough Guys Don't Dance	5:41
6.	"Twilight's Last Gleaming"	High Society	7:36
7.	"Tread Softly"	Tough Guys Don't Dance	6:10
8.	"Lovesick"	High Society	7:14
9.	"Music Is Everything"	True Colours	7:36
10.	"The Persistence Of Memory"	High Society '	6:29
11.	"Basement Track"	High Society	5:41
12.	"When The Lights Go Down"	Non-album single	6:54

=== Disc 2 - The Remixes ===
1. Adele - "Hometown Glory"
2. The Streets - "Has It Come To This?"
3. High Contrast - "The Basement Track" (HC's Upstairs Downstairs Remix)
4. Omni Trio - "Renegade Snares"
5. Eric Prydz - "Pjanoo"
6. London Elektricity - "Remember The Future"
7. Utah Saints - "Something Good 08"
8. Ils - "No Soul"
9. Missy Elliott - "We Run This"
10. Blaze - "Most Precious Love"
11. Blue Sonix - "This Feeling"
12. Basement Jaxx - "Hey U"
13. London Elektricity - "My Dreams"

== Certifications ==
Region	Certification	Certified units/sales
United Kingdom (BPI)	Gold	100,000^{‡}
^{‡} Sales+streaming figures based on certification alone.

== Release history ==
Region	Date	Label	Format	Catalog
United Kingdom	24 April 2009	Hospital Records	29 x File, FLAC	NHS151DD2
United Kingdom	27 April 2009	Hospital	double CD	NHS151CD
