= FabricLive.44 =

Compilation album by Commix
- Released: February 2009
- Label: Fabric
- Producer: Commix

Commix chronology
Call to Mind (2007)	FabricLive.44 (2009)

FabricLive chronology
FabricLive.43 (2009)	FabricLive.44 (2009)	FabricLive.45 (2009)

Professional ratings
Review scores
Source	Rating
Allmusic	4/5 stars

FabricLive.44 is a 2009 album by English electronic group Commix. The album was released as part of the FabricLive Mix Series. It was awarded Best Compilation in Best of British awards 2009 by DJ Mag.

== Track listing ==
1. Commix - Life We Live - Soul:R
2. Rufige Kru - Sometime Sad Day - Metalheadz
3. D-Bridge - Creatures of Habit - Exit
4. Alix Perez - The Reckoning - Alix Perez
5. Data - The Causeway - Influence
6. Logistics - Murderation - Hospital
7. Commix - Justified - Metalheadz
8. Spectrasoul - Buried - 31 Records
9. Calibre - Can't Get Over You - Soul:R
10. Lynx & Alix Perez ft. Kemo - Dangerous - Soul:R
11. Commix - Belleview (D-Bridge's Belle-reviewed Mix) - Metalheadz
12. Spectrasoul & Ben E - Suppression - Spectrasoul
13. Calibre - In Denial - Soul:R
14. Commix - Bear Music - Hospital
15. OAK - No Sunrise - Brand Nu
16. Breakage - Old School Ting - Breakage
17. Instra:mental - No Future - NonPlus+
18. Photek - Yendi - Science
19. Instra:mental - Photograph - Darkestral
