= Ultraviolet (Fred V & Grafix song) =

Single by Fred V & Grafix

from the album Oxygen
- B-side: "Comb Funk"
- Released: 18 March 2016
- Genre: Drum and bass; liquid funk
- Length: 4:13
- Label: Hospital
- Songwriters: Fred Vahrman; Josh Jackson; Tudor Davies
- Producer: Fred V & Grafix

Fred V & Grafix singles chronology
"Forest Fires" (2014)	"Ultraviolet" (2016)

Music video
- "Ultraviolet" on YouTube

"Ultraviolet" is a single by English drum and bass record production duo Fred V & Grafix. It was released on 18 March 2016 as the lead single from their second studio album, Oxygen (2016). "Ultraviolet" features vocals from Bristol-based singer-songwriter Chelsea Watts. The B-side track "Comb Funk" features vocal samples from singer Shannon Kitchen. Both tracks have been played on BBC Radio 1 and 1Xtra by British DJs MistaJam and Friction.

== Track listing ==
Digital download
No.	Title	Length
1.	"Ultraviolet"	4:13
2.	"Comb Funk"	4:13

== Release history ==
Country	Release date	Format
Worldwide	18 March 2016	12"; digital download

== Personnel ==
- Fred Vahrman – producer, writer
- Josh "Grafix" Jackson – producer, writer
- Chelsea Watts – vocals ("Ultraviolet")
- Shannon Kitchen – vocals ("Comb Funk")
- Lewis Hopkin – mastering
- Songs in the Key of Knife – publishing
- Ricky Trickartt – artwork
