= Right Beside You =

Right Beside You may refer to:

- Right Beside You (Sophie B. Hawkins song)
- Right Beside You (Jakwob song)
- Right Beside You, a song by Building 429 from the album Listen to the Sound
- Right Beside You a 2016 album by Jeff White
