= Logistics (musician) =

- Born: Matt Gresham; 30 July 1981 (age 45)
- Origin: Cambridge, England
- Genres: Drum and bass
- Occupations: Producer, disc jockey
- Years active: 2004–present
- Label: Hospital Records

Matt Gresham (born 30 July 1981), better known by his stage name Logistics, is an English drum and bass music producer and DJ from Cambridge, England. He is signed to Hospital Records and has released eight albums.

== Biography ==
Gresham grew up listening mainly to guitar based music such as Rage Against the Machine, and downtempo electronic music. He took no interest in drum and bass until he was introduced to the "Music Box" LP released by Full Cycle Records, which appealed to him as he described it "like downtempo tunes with double time beats".

He creates his music using the Ableton sequencer. His music style tends to be towards the more soul-influenced styles of drum and bass but is also targeted at a club audience rather than a home audience, which is described as such by Hospital Records as "bridging the gap between a lacklustre subgenre, liquid funk, and more exciting, dancefloor orientated drum and bass". His two brothers—Dan Gresham (known as Nu:Tone) and Nick Gresham (known as Other Echoes and, formerly, Bastille)—are also producers signed to Hospital Records. Matt has also collaborated with Dan under the name Nu:Logic.

The first release Gresham was involved in was a collaborative work as Nu:Logic, on Tangent Recordings in 2003. He then went on to release his first work under the name Logistics, "Come To You / Music", on Nu:Tone's own label, Brand.nu, which led to his signing to Hospital Records. At the time, Gresham was taking a degree in graphic design at Goldsmiths College, but he left to pursue a professional career in music production, after achieving success in the drum and bass scene. After leaving college, he released tracks such as "Together" and "Spacejam" (from the Spacejam EP) and "The Trip" (from Weapons of Mass Creation 2) which attracted the attention of Grooverider and Andy C.

The Trip (2004)
Excerpt from "The Trip", released on Hospital Records' compilation Weapons of Mass Creation 2.

His 2006 album "Now More Than Ever", won BBC 1Xtra's 2007 Xtra Bass award. London Elektricity's Tony Colman, the label manager of Hospital Records, described the album in an interview as (at the time) "the most eagerly anticipated debut album ever to be released on Hospital."

He released his seventh studio album, Electric Sun, on 25 March 2016.

On 30 March 2018, the album Hologram was released; the single "Lotus Flower" off this album was released in late 2017.

== Discography ==
Studio albums

Title	Year
Now More Than Ever	2006
Reality Checkpoint	2008
Crash Bang Wallop	2009
Spacejams	2010
Fear Not	2012
Polyphony	2014
Electric Sun	2016
Hologram	2018
Earthling	2026

Singles and EPs

Title	Featured artists	Label	Year
Rock The Jazzbar E.P.	Nu:Tone feat. Logistics	Tangent Recordings	2003
Free My Soul / Replay	SKC+Safair / Logistics	Hospital Records	2004
Come To You / Music	Danism / Logistics	BrandNu Recordings	2004
I Want To Know / Hold On Be Strong	Commix / Logistics	Advanced Recordings	2004
The Future Sound Of Cambridge	Nu:Tone / Logistics / Commix	Hospital Records	2004
Millionaire / Front To Back	Logistics	Innerground Records	2004
Surround / Deep Joy	Commix / Logistics	BrandNu Recordings	2004
Spacejam EP	Logistics	Hospital Records	2004
Play The Game / Sin City	Friction and Logistics	Valve Recordings	2005
Release The Pressure EP	Logistics	Hospital Records	2005
Weapons of Mass Creation 2 Sampler	Logistics / CLS+Wax	Hospital Records	2005
Uprock / Static	Logistics	M*A*S*H	2005
Beatbox Master / Girl From Mars	Logistics	Hospital Records	2006
Blackout / Krusty Bass Rinser	Logistics	Hospital Records	2006
City Life	Logistics	Hospital Records	2006
Flashback / Can't Let Go	Cyantific + Logistics	Hospital Records	2006
Blackout / Bounce	Logistics	Hospital Records	2006
Wide Lens EP	Logistics	Hospital Records	2007
Reality Checkpoint Part One	Logistics	Hospital Records	2008
Reality Checkpoint Part Two	Logistics	Hospital Records	2008
Jungle Music / Toytown	Logistics	Hospital Records	2009
Warehouse (Ill.Skillz Remix) / 1 N 2	Logistics / Jonny L	Hospital Records	2010
Brighter Day / 88 MPH	Cyantific and Logistics	Cyantific Records	2010
Gridline / They Could Love	Ill.Skillz vs. Logistics	Ill.Skillz Recordings	2010
Fifteen Years of Hospital Records: Sampler One	High Contrast / Logistics	Hospital Records	2011
Somersaults / Triangles	Logistics	Hospital Records	2014
Waveforms	Logistics	Hospital Records	2019
Headspace	Logistics	Hospital Records	2020
Love Letters	Logistics	Hospital Records	2022
End Sequence	Logistics	Hospital Records	2023

Remixes

Artist	Remix	Label	Year
Mood II Swing	I Got Love (Logistics Remix)	Bingo	2005
Friction & Nu Balance	Slipstream (Logistics Remix)	Playaz Recordings	2005
Mutt	Blue (Logistics Remix)	Crisis Recordings	2006
Syncopix	Together Again (Logistics Remix)	Syncopix Records	2006
Leviticus	Burial (Logistics Remix)	Philly Blunt Records	2006
London Elektricity	The Great Drum & Bass Swindle (Logistics Remix)	Hospital Records	2007
ShockOne	Further Away From Me (Logistics Remix)	SGN:LTD	2008
Blue Sonix	Luv Me (Logistics Remix)	Spearhead Records	2008
Matrix & Futurebound	Family (Nu:tone & Logistics Remix)	Viper / Metro	2008
BCee	Consumed (Logistics Remix)	Spearhead Records	2009
Danny Breaks	Droppin Science Volume 1 (Logistics Remix)	Hospital Records	2009
Way Out West	The Gift (Logistics Remix)	Deconstruction	2009
Zed Bias	Neighbourhood (Logistics Remix)	Locked On	2009
Booka Shade vs M.A.N.D.Y	Donut (Logistics Remix)	Get Physical	2010
Shapeshifter	Lifetime (Logistics Remix)	Hospital Records	2010
Devlin ft. Yasmin	Runaway (Nu:Tone and Logistics Remix)	Universal / Island Records	2010
S.P.Y	By Your Side (Logistics Remix)	Spearhead Records	2010
Sky Ferreira	One (Logistics Remix)	Capitol Records	2010
Wretch 32 feat. Example	Unorthodox (Logistics Remix)	Ministry Of Sound	2011
London Elektricity	The Plan That Cannot Fail (Logistics Remix)	Hospital Records	2011
Rebecca Ferguson	Nothing's Real But Love (Logistics Remix)	RCA Records	2012
Afrojack & Shermanology	Can't Stop Me (Logistics Remix)	3beat	2012
Russ Chimes	Back 2 You (Logistics Remix)	Positiva	2012
Taku Inoue	Night Falls (Logistics Remix)	Namco	2012
Electric Guest	This Head I Hold (Nu:Logic Remix)	Warner Music	2013
Capital Cities	Safe and Sound (Nu:Logic Remix)	Capitol Records	2013
Four Tet	Angel Echoes (Logistics remix)	Domino	2014
Birdy	Wings (Nu:Logic Remix)	Warner Music	2014
Maduk	Believe (Logistics Remix)	Liquicity	2014
Fred V & Grafix	Sick Of All Your Secrets (Logistics Remix)	Hospital Records	2014
The Writers Block	Don't Look Any Further (Logistics Remix)	Ultra Music	2014
Above & Beyond	Blue Sky Action (Logistics Remix)	Anjuna Beats	2015
Saint Raymond	I Want You (Logistics Remix)	Warner Music	2015
Russ Chimes	We Need Nothing To Collide (Logistics Remix)	Hospital Records	2015
Andreya Triana	Gold (Logistics Remix)	Counter Records	2015
Etherwood	Light My Way Home (Logistics Remix)	Hospital Records	2016
Wilkinson ft. Wretch 32	Flatline (Nu:Logic Remix)	Virgin EMI	2016
WRLD & Father Dude	Galaxies (Logistics Remix)	NEST HQ	2016
BCee & Charlotte Haining	First Love (Logistics Remix)	Spearhead Records	2020
Blue Sonix	Luv Me (Logistics Remix)	Spearhead Records	2021
London Elektricity	Never Trust A Hippy (Logistics Remix)	Hospital Records	2021
Logistics	Jungle Music (DRS & Dynamite x Logistics Remix)	Hospital Records	2021
