= Jakwob =

English music producer (born 1989)

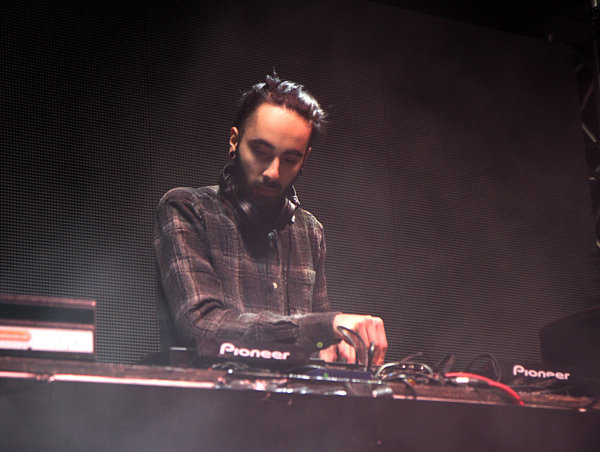
- Jakwob in 2012

Background information
- Born: James Edward Jacob; 28 March 1989 (age 37)
- Origin: Hereford, England
- Years active: 2009-present

James Edward Jacob (born 28 March 1989), also known by his stage name Jakwob, is a British music producer, songwriter, DJ and composer.

== Early life ==
Jacob was born in Hereford and grew up in Lincoln. His parents are Anglo Indian and Scottish. As a multi-instrumentalist, in his early teenage years, he was involved in many local bands – starting out in jazz but soon moving on to death metal and folk.

== 2009–present: Mainstream success as Jakwob ==
In 2009, Jacob won acclaim in the blog world for his bootleg of Ellie Goulding's "Starry Eyed". In November 2009, he was given his first airplay on national radio when his remix of Ellie Goulding's "Under the Sheets" was played on BBC Radio 1 as Zane Lowe's 'Hottest Record in the World'. (A title which was also given to "Electrify" and "Please Ft. Kano".) He released his debut single "Here with Me" on his own label, Boom Ting Recordings on 13 September 2010.

== Film scores ==
Jacob's first feature film score was for Molly Manning Walker's 2023 How to Have Sex. The film premiered at the 2023 Cannes film festival and won the Un Certain Regard prize. In 2024, it was nominated for 3 BAFTA Film Awards.

Year	Title	Role
	Sugar	Composer
	Major Players	Composer
	Our Fault: London	Composer
2026	Your Fault: London	Composer
2025	National Theatre Live: Inter Alia	Composer
2025	What It Feels Like for a Girl	Composer & Music Consultant
2025	My Fault: London	Composer
2023	How to Have Sex	Composer & Music Consultant
2022	On Your Behalf	Composer
2022	Wings	Composer
2019	Mothering	Composer
2018	Reach	Composer
2015	Holy Thursday	Composer
2015	More Hate Than Fear	Composer

== Production and songwriting ==
Year	Artist	Song title	Label	Credit
2026	Little Simz	Sugar Girl: Thats A No No	AWAL	Producer/Co Writer
2026	Little Simz	Sugar Girl: Game On ft JT	AWAL	Producer/Co Writer
2026	Little Simz	Sugar Girl: Open Arms ft Deela	AWAL	Producer/Co Writer
2026	Little Simz	Sugar Girl: Telephone ft 070 Shake	AWAL	Producer/Co Writer
2026	Erin Lecount	American Dream	Good As Gold	Additional Production
2026	Nia Archives	Feelingz Go Numb	Island Records	Composer, producer
2025	Erin Lecount	808 Hymn	Good As Gold	Additional Production
2025	Jorja Smith	With You	FAMM	Co-Producer
2025	Erin Lecount	Marble Arch	Good As Gold	Co-Producer
2025	Kam-BU	Metropolis	Believe UK	Producer/Co Writer
2025	Charlotte Plank	Was It All A Dream?	Sony RCA	Producer/Co Writer
2025	Jakwob	Nick & Noah	My Fault: London (Original Motion Picture Score)	Composer/Producer/Mixer
2025	Jakwob	Florida	My Fault: London (Original Motion Picture Score)	Composer/Producer/Mixer
2025	Jakwob	Arrival	My Fault: London (Original Motion Picture Score)	Composer/Producer/Mixer
2025	Jakwob	The Race	My Fault: London (Original Motion Picture Score)	Composer/Producer/Mixer
2025	Jakwob	Scars	My Fault: London (Original Motion Picture Score)	Composer/Producer/Mixer
2025	Jakwob	Burning Tees	My Fault: London (Original Motion Picture Score)	Composer/Producer/Mixer
2025	Jakwob	I Know What You Want	My Fault: London (Original Motion Picture Score)	Composer/Producer/Mixer
2025	Jakwob	What The Hell Are You Doing To Me	My Fault: London (Original Motion Picture Score)	Composer/Producer/Mixer
2025	Jakwob	Confessions	My Fault: London (Original Motion Picture Score)	Composer/Producer/Mixer
2025	Jakwob	Happy In Love	My Fault: London (Original Motion Picture Score)	Composer/Producer/Mixer
2025	Jakwob	Drive!	My Fault: London (Original Motion Picture Score)	Composer/Producer/Mixer
2025	Jakwob	Home Time	My Fault: London (Original Motion Picture Score)	Composer/Producer/Mixer
2024	Jakwob	Best Holiday Ever	How To Have Sex (Original Motion Picture Soundtrack)	Composer/Producer/Mixer
2024	Jakwob	Are chips vegetables?	How To Have Sex (Original Motion Picture Soundtrack)	Composer/Producer/Mixer
2024	Jakwob	I thought you were the fun one?	How To Have Sex (Original Motion Picture Soundtrack)	Composer/Producer/Mixer
2024	Jakwob	Are you on your ones?	How To Have Sex (Original Motion Picture Soundtrack)	Composer/Producer/Mixer
2024	Jakwob	TARA TARA TARA	How To Have Sex (Original Motion Picture Soundtrack)	Composer/Producer/Mixer
2024	Jakwob	Two coats any bags? Yeah that's 4 pounds	How To Have Sex (Original Motion Picture Soundtrack)	Composer/Producer/Mixer
2024	Jakwob	I'm asleep	How To Have Sex (Original Motion Picture Soundtrack)	Composer/Producer/Mixer
2024	Jakwob	Fuck the beach	How To Have Sex (Original Motion Picture Soundtrack)	Composer/Producer/Mixer
2024	Jakwob	He lives on my street	How To Have Sex (Original Motion Picture Soundtrack)	Composer/Producer/Mixer
2024	Jakwob	Oh ah malia	How To Have Sex (Original Motion Picture Soundtrack)	Composer/Producer/Mixer
2024	Jakwob	We got this	How To Have Sex (Original Motion Picture Soundtrack)	Composer/Producer/Mixer
2024	Little Simz	Drop 7: Mood Swings	Forever Living Originals	Producer/Co Writer
2024	Little Simz	Drop 7: Fever	Forever Living Originals	Producer/Co Writer
2024	Little Simz	Drop 7: Torch	Forever Living Originals	Producer/Co Writer
2024	Little Simz	Drop 7: SOS	Forever Living Originals	Producer/Co Writer
2024	Little Simz	Drop 7: I Aint Feeling It	Forever Living Originals	Producer/Co Writer
2024	Little Simz	Drop 7: Power	Forever Living Originals	Producer/Co Writer
2024	Little Simz	Drop 7: Far Away	Forever Living Originals	Producer/Co Writer
2024	Lapsley	4AM Ascension Day	Believe UK	Producer/Co Writer
2024	Shygirl	Making The Beast	Fabric Records	Producer/Co Writer
2024	Kam-BU	Bring Me Up	Believe UK	Producer/Co Writer
2024	Beckah Amani	Sober	Believe UK	Producer/Co Writer
2024	Deto Black	D-Ride	Payday Records	Producer/Co Writer
2024	Charlotte Plank	Stargirl	Sony RCA	Producer/Co Writer
2024	Nono	Fenomenal	Helix Records	Producer/Co Writer
2023	Nia Archives	Baiana	Island Records	Producer/Co Writer
2023	Nia Archives	So Tell Me...	Island Records	Producer/Co Writer
2023	Nia Archives	That's Tha Way Life Goes	Island Records	Producer/Co Writer
2023	Nia Archives	No Need 2 Be Sorry, Call Me?	Island Records	Producer/Co Writer
2023	Nia Archives	Conveniency	Island Records	Producer/Co Writer
2023	Nia Archives	Sunrise Bang Your Head Against Tha Wall	Island Records	Producer
2023	Yunè Pinku	Sports	Platoon	Producer/Co-writer
2023	Nia Archives	Off Wiv Ya Headz	Island Records	Producer
2023	Erin LeCount	Heaven	Good As Gold	Co-Producer
2023	Erin LeCount	Heartbreak Hotel	Good As Gold	Co-Producer
2023	Erin LeCount	Bday Blues	Good As Gold	Co-Producer
2023	p-rallel	I Know	Black Butter	Producer/Co-writer
2023	CLIP	Can U Feel Meh	CLIP	Producer/Co-writer
2023	Truman	Charley Boy	Rank Records	Producer/Co-writer
2023	Betty	Mum Says	EYC Records	Producer/Co-writer
2023	P-rallel	It's A Lundun Thing	Black Butter	Producer/Co-producer
2023	P-rallel	I Know	Black Butter	Producer/Co-producer
2023	P-rallel	Superstylin	Black Butter	Producer/Co-producer
2023	P-rallel	Destination Unknown	Black Butter	Producer/Co-producer
2023	P-rallel	Go	Black Butter	Producer/Co-producer
2023	P-rallel	Walk Away	Black Butter	Producer/Co-producer
2023	P-rallel	By My Side	Black Butter	Producer/Co-producer
2023	Charlotte Plank	Redline	Sony RCA	Mixer
2023	Charlotte Plank	Let You Down	Sony RCA	Mixer
2022	Nia Archives	Ode 2 Maya	Island Records	Producer/Co-writer
2022	Nia Archives	Forbidden Feelings	Island Records	Producer/Co-writer
2022	Nia Archives	18 & Over	Island Records	Producer/Co-writer
2022	Nia Archives	Luv Like	Island Records	Producer/Co-writer
2022	Nia Archives	Part of Me	Island Records	Producer/Co-writer
2022	Nia Archives	Gud Gubyez	Island Records	Producer/Co-writer
2022	Louis Dunford	Summer in the Manor	Sony RCA	Producer
2022	Louis Dunford	Henry The Brave	Sony RCA	Producer
2022	Louis Dunford	Bossman	Sony RCA	Producer
2022	Erin LeCount	Killing Time	Good As Gold	Producer
2022	Meyy	Blush	Unity Records	Producer/Co-writer
2022	Kam-BU	Eton Mess	Off Grid	Producer/Co-writer
2021	Deyah	Jericho	High Mileage, Low Life	Producer/Mixer
2021	Deyah	Room 21	High Mileage, Low Life	Producer/Mixer
2021	Deyah	Hush	High Mileage, Low Life	Producer/Mixer
2021	Little Simz	Rollin Stone	AWAL	Producer/Co-writer
2021	Emma Bradley	Over And Out	Twrk	Producer/Co-writer
2021	Lucy Tun	Monarchy	Hello Friendly	Producer/Co-writer
2021	Shygirl	Cleo	Because Music	Producer/Co-writer
2020	Tender Central	Body	Hello Friendly	Producer/Co-writer
2020	Tender Central	Prelude	Hello Friendly	Producer/Co-writer
2020	Tender Central	Of The Sea	Hello Friendly	Producer/Co-writer
2020	Tender Central	Ashes	Hello Friendly	Producer/Co-writer
2020	Tender Central	Human	Hello Friendly	Producer/Co-writer
2020	Tender Central	I'm Here	Hello Friendly	Producer/Co-writer
2020	Tender Central	Morning	Hello Friendly	Producer/Co-writer
2020	Tender Central	Interlude	Hello Friendly	Producer/Co-writer
2020	Tender Central	Tender Central	Hello Friendly	Producer/Co-writer
2020	Tender Central	Hands And Limbs	Hello Friendly	Producer/Co-writer
2020	Tender Central	Lion	Hello Friendly	Producer/Co-writer
2020	Tender Central	The Garden	Hello Friendly	Producer/Co-writer
2020	Louis Dunford	London's Requiem	Sony RCA	Producer
2020	Louis Dunford	When We Were Hooligans	Sony RCA	Producer
2020	Louis Dunford	Ballad of Benjamin	Sony RCA	Producer
2020	Louis Dunford	Regretamine	Sony RCA	Producer
2020	Louis Dunford	Hello Depression	Sony RCA	Producer
2019	Barney Fletcher	Christ Flow	TaP Records	Producer/Co-writer
2019	Barney Fletcher	Better Than You	TaP Records	Producer/Co-writer
2019	T.Williams & James Jacob	The Remedy	Strictly Rhythm	Producer/Co-writer
2018	Aurora	Queendom	Decca Records	Producer/Co-writer
2018	Aurora	Gentle Earthquakes	Decca Records	Producer/Co-writer
2018	Aurora	Soft Universe	Decca Records	Producer/Co-writer
2018	Jaykae	Honey Dew	Ministry of Sound	Producer/Co-writer
2018	Ryan Ashley	Shame	Ryan Ashley	Producer/Co-writer
2018	Joseph J Jones	Mercy	Communion Records	Producer/Co-writer
2017	Celeste	Chocolate	Bank Holiday Records	Producer/Co-writer
2016	Meridian Dan	Don't Feed The Animals	Universal Music Group	Producer/Co-writer
2016	Tender Central	Wake Me Up	Boom Ting Recordings	Producer/Co-writer
2016	Tender Central	Burn Bright	Communion Records	Producer/Co-writer
2016	Riz MC	Englistan	Riz Mc	Producer/Co-writer
2015	Little Simz	Time Capsule	AWAL	Producer/Co-writer
2015	Little Simz	Devour	AWAL	Producer/Co-writer
2015	Sakima	Energy	Boom Ting Recordings	Producer/Co-writer
2014	Kyla La Grange	Cut Your Teeth	Epic	Producer
2014	Kyla La Grange	Maia	Epic	Producer
2014	Kyla La Grange	Cannibals	Epic	Producer
2014	Kyla La Grange	I Don't Hate You	Epic	Producer
2014	Kyla La Grange	White Doves	Epic	Producer
2014	Kyla La Grange	The Knife	Epic	Producer
2014	Kyla La Grange	Fly	Epic	Producer
2014	Kyla La Grange	Never That Young	Epic	Producer
2014	Kyla La Grange	Get It	Epic	Producer
2014	George the Poet	Its Yours	Which?	Producer/Co-writer
2013	Laura Welsh	Betrayal	Polydor	Producer/Co-writer
2012	Charli XCX	Forgiveness	Charli XCX	Producer/Co-writer

== Remix discography ==
Artist Name	Track title	Label
Alan Pownall	A Life Worth Living	Mercury Records
Audio Bullys	Only Man	Face Piece Records
Banfi	June	Universal Music Group
Bring Me the Horizon	Can You Feel My Heart	Epitaph Records
Chiddy Bang	Ray Charles	Virgin Records
Culture Shock	City Lights	RAM Records
Dan le Sac vs Scroobius Pip	Get Better	Sunday Best Recordings
Ellie Goulding	Starry Eyed	Polydor
Ellie Goulding	Under the Sheets	Neon Gold Records
Escape the Fate	Issues	Epitaph Records
Etherwood	Light My Way Home	Hospital Records
Frankmusik	Confusion Girl	Island Records
Get Cape. Wear Cape. Fly	Collapsing Cities	Atlantic Records
Hybrid Minds	Mountains	Hybrid Music
I Blame Coco	Self Machine	Island Records
Icona Pop (feat. Charli XCX)	I Love It	TEN Music Group
Jessie J	Do It Like a Dude	Universal Music Group
Katie Melua	The Flood	Dramatico Records
Killa Kela	Everyday	100% Records
Kimberly Anne	Lair	Universal Music Group
Kid Sister	Day Dreaming	Universal Music Group
Klarkarussell	Sun Don't Shine	Universal Music Group
Lana Del Rey	Video Games	Polydor
Linden Jay (feat. Shola Ama)	Lose Again	Universal Music Group
Lily Allen	The Fear	Regal Recordings
Melissa Steel	You Love Me?	Atlantic Records
M.I.A.	Pull Up the People	XL Recordings
Matisyahu (feat. Akon)	One Day	Epic Records
Mr Fogg	Moving Parts	Kicking Ink Recordings
Penguin Prison	Animal	Downtown Records
Robyn	Dancing on My Own	Konichiwa Records
Sigma	Nobody to Love	3 Beat Records
Sinead Harnett	Paradise	Rinse FM
Smiler (feat. Professor Green & Tawiah)	Top of the World	Ministry of Sound
Tiësto vs Diplo (feat. Busta Rhymes)	Catch 'Em By Surprise	Ultra Music
The Temper Trap	Fader	Infectious Music
The Two Bears	Angel	Southern Fried Records
Usher	Numb	LaFace Records
Wilkinson	Take You Higher	RAM Records
William Orbit	Nimrod	Sanctuary Records

== Artist discography ==
As Jakwob
Year	Single/EP	Peak chart positions				Label
Year	Single/EP	UK	UK Dance	UK Indie	BEL	Label
2010	"Here With Me"	—	—	—	—	Boom Ting Recordings
2011	"Right Beside You" (featuring Smiler)	—	—	—	18	Boom Ting Recordings
2012	"Electrify" (featuring Jetta)	130	27	—	—	Boom Ting Recordings
2012	"Blinding" (featuring Rocky Nti)	—	—	26	—	Boom Ting Recordings
	The Prize (Mixtape): Turn To Stone; Slaves Ft 14th; Sailing Ft Roses Gabor; Stay; Islands Ft Ghostpoet; Please Ft Kano; Erupt Ft Youngman; Feeling The Desire; Let It Fall Ft Rocky Nti; The Prize Ft Mr Hudson	—				Boom Ting Recordings
2013	"Fade" (featuring Maiday)	35	6	5	66	Boom Ting Recordings
2014	"Somebody New" (featuring Tiffani Juno)	47	16	2	—	Digital Sound Boy
2014	"No Place Like Home" (featuring Rational)	—				Digital Sound Boy
2015	"Spaced"	—				Boom Ting Recordings
2015	"Footwork"	—				Boom Ting Recordings
2015	"Deeper"	—				Boom Ting Recordings
2016	"Work It Out EP"	—				Boom Ting Recordings
2016	"Feel So Good EP"	—				Turbo Recordings
2016	"Bring The Heat EP"	—				Boom Ting Recordings
2016	"Inside" (featuring Hife)	—				Do Not Sleep
2016	"Balance"	—				This Ain't Bristol
2017	"Lifted"	—				Boom Ting Recordings

As Get Hot
Year	Single/EP	Label
2014	Drugs	Lucky Number Music
2014	Party	Lucky Number Music
2015	Fight	Lucky Number Music
2018	TBA	Last Gang Records

As Kindred
Year	Single/EP	Label
2015	Killa	MTA
2016	Kill With Kindness	Clans
2017	Jungle Sound	Clans

As James Jacob
Year	Single/EP	Label
2016	The Point	Strictly Rhythm
2017	Together	Madhouse
2017	Flow	Food Music
2018	The Learning Process	Strictly Rhythm
2019	Cargo	TTR White
2019	The Remedy	Strictly Rhythm
