= Electrification (disambiguation) =

Electrification may refer to:

== Technology ==
- Electrification, the process of converting a system to use electricity as its energy source
  - Electrification of transport
  - Rail electrification
  - Electricity as part of a catalytic processes
- Rural electrification, the process of bringing electrical power to rural and remote areas

== Physics ==
- (An object is) charged with (static) electricity, see triboelectric effect (contact electrification)
- The species that lead to charge, electric charge

== Music ==
- Electrified (Dressy Bessy album), 2005
- Electrified (Pink Cream 69 album), 1998
- Electrify (song), a song by British DJ and producer Jakwob from his upcoming debut studio album
- "Electrify", a song by the Beastie Boys from the album Hello Nasty.
- "Electrified", a song by Gotthard from the album Silver
