= The Agony and the Ecstasy =

The Agony and the Ecstasy may refer to:

- The Agony and the Ecstasy (novel), a 1961 novel by Irving Stone about the painter Michelangelo
  - The Agony and the Ecstasy (film), a 1965 film starring Charlton Heston, partly based on the novel
- The Agony and the Ecstasy (album), a 2012 release by High Contrast
- "The Agony and the Ecstasy", a song by Smokey Robinson from the 1975 album A Quiet Storm
- The Agony and the Ecstasy cartoon series featuring Lobster Random
- The Agony and the Ecstasy, 2012 exhibition by artist Parker Ito

== See also ==
- Drunk on the Pope's Blood/The Agony Is the Ecstacy, 1982 EP by The Birthday Party and Lydia Lunch
- The Agony Without the Ecstasy, 2000 EP by Fosca
- Agony and Ecstasy: My Life in Dance, autobiography of Czech ballet dancer Daria Klimentová
