= Forest Fires (song) =

Single by Fred V & Grafix featuring Etherwood

from the album Recognise
- Released: 16 June 2014
- Genre: Drum and bass
- Length: 3:26
- Label: Hospital
- Songwriter(s): Fred Vahrman; Josh Jackson; Edward Allen
- Producer(s): Fred V & Grafix

Fred V & Grafix singles chronology
"Recognise" (2014)	"Forest Fires" (2014)	"Ultraviolet" (2016)

Etherwood singles chronology
"Forest Fires" (2014)	"You'll Always Be a Part of Me" (2015)

Music video
- "Forest Fires" on YouTube

"Forest Fires" is a song by English drum and bass record production duo Fred V & Grafix, featuring vocals from fellow drum and bass musician Etherwood. It was released as the second single from their debut album, Recognise, on 16 June 2014. The song reached number 77 in the UK Singles Chart after support from BBC Radio 1. The song featured twice on the Bad Education episode "Sports Day".

== Track listing ==
Digital download
No.	Title	Length
1.	"Forest Fires"	3:26
2.	"Forest Fires" (Etherwood remix)	5:36
3.	"Forest Fires" (Taiki Nulight remix)	5:06
4.	"Forest Fires" (Massappeals remix)	4:12
5.	"Forest Fires" (Loire remix)	3:41

== Chart performance ==
=== Weekly charts ===
Chart (2013)	Peak position
UK Dance (OCC)	23
UK Indie (OCC)	5
UK Singles (Official Charts Company)	77

== Release history ==
Country	Release date	Format
Worldwide	16 June 2014	Digital download

== Personnel ==
- Fred Vahrman – producer, writer
- Josh "Grafix" Jackson – producer, writer
- Edward "Etherwood" Allen – lead vocals, writer
- Josie Radford – backing vocals
- Tom Kelsey – mastering
- Edgar Dewsbery – mastering
- Songs in the Key of Knife – publishing
- Ricky Trickartt – artwork
