= Nu:Tone =

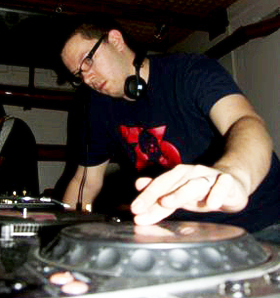
- Nu:Tone in Zurich in 2006

Background information
- Born: Dan Gresham; 23 August 1976 (age 49)
- Origin: Cambridge, England
- Genres: Drum and bass, liquid funk
- Occupations: Producer, disc jockey
- Years active: 2001–present
- Label: Hospital
- Website: http://www.nutone.org/

Dan Gresham, better known by the stage name Nu:Tone, is a British drum and bass producer who is signed to the Hospital Records label.

== Background ==
He signed to Hospital records in May 2003, and released his first album Brave Nu World in 2005. His second album Back of Beyond was released in June 2007. The third album, Words and Pictures, was released on 28 February 2011 on Hospital Records, and was made available on 2xLP, CD, MP3, and limited edition vinyl. Words and Pictures features contributions from 4hero, Ben Westbeech, Natalie Williams, Logistics, and Heidi Vogel, among others. His brothers, Matt Gresham, known as Logistics and Nick Gresham, known as Other Echoes are also active in the drum and bass scene. He also releases music with his brother Matt as the duo Nu:Logic.

== Discography ==
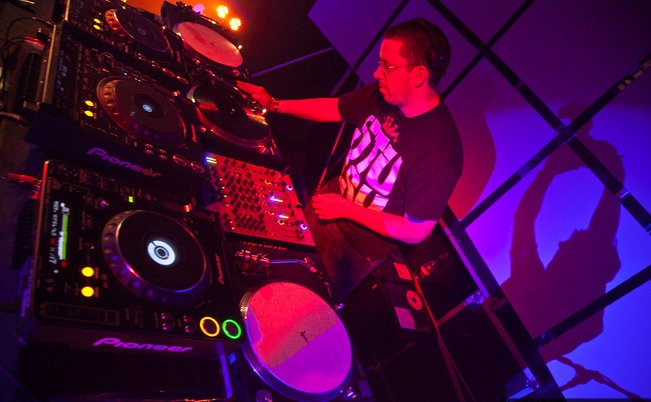
Nu:Tone in 2009

=== Studio albums ===
Year	Album details
2005	Brave Nu World: Released: 14 March 2005; Label: Hospital Records; Formats: CD, digital download, vinyl
2007	Back of Beyond: Released: 18 June 2007; Label: Hospital Records, Third Ear; Formats: CD, digital download, vinyl
2011	Words and Pictures: Released: 28 February 2011; Label: Hospital Records; Formats: CD, digital download, vinyl
2014	Future History: Released: 10 November 2014; Label: Hospital Records; Formats: CD, digital download, vinyl
2021	Little Spaces: Releasing: 26 February 2021; Label: Hospital Records; Formats: CD, digital download, vinyl

=== Compilations ===
Year	Album details
2008	Medical History: Released: 7 March 2008; Label: Hospital Records; Formats: Digital Download

=== Singles ===
- Grand Central/The Boss (12") (Beta Recordings, 2001)
- e.Spresso/Chupa Meus Samples (12") (Chihuahua Records, 2001)
- 123Fm/Get It On (12") (Tangent Records, 2003)
- Our House/GMAS (12") (BrandNu Recordings, 2003)
- Vital Organ (Taken from Soul:ution Sampler 1 12") (Soul:R, 2003)
- What Goes Around Comes Around/Don't Go Changing (12") (New ID, 2003)
- Jazm (taken from Jazz&Bass Session IV CD/LP) (New ID, 2004)
- Breathless/Feel It (12") (Hospital Records, 2004)
- Millie's Theme (taken from The Future Sound of Cambridge EP) (Hospital Records, 2004)
- Three Bags Full/Strange Encounter (12") (Hospital Records, 2005)
- Seven Years/Stay Strong (12") (feat Natalie Williams) (Hospital Records, 2005)
- Three Bags Full (12") (Hospital Records, 2005)
- Upgrade [with Syncopix] (12") (Hospital Records, 2006)
- The Things That Lovers Do/Missing Link (12") (Hospital Records, 2006)
- Boy Who Lost His Smile (taken from The Future Sound of Cambridge 2 EP) (Hospital Records, 2006)
- Beliefs (feat Pat Fulgoni) (12") (Hospital Records, 2007)
- System (Matrix and Futurebound Remix)/The Second Connection (12") (Hospital Records, 2007)
- Hyper Hyper / Set Me Free (12") (Hospital Records, 2010)
- Shine In (feat Natalie Williams) / Bleeper (feat. Logistics) (Hospital Records, 2011)
- Sweeter / Do It Right (12") (Hospital Records, 2020)
- One Day at a Time (feat. Lalin St. Juste) (Hospital Records, 2021)

=== Remixes ===
- Phuturistix & Jenna G – "Beautiful" (Hospital Records, 2003)
- Lenny Fontana Presents Black Sun – "Spread Love" (Hospital Records, 2003)
- London Elektricity – "Different Drum" (Hospital Records, 2003)
- Roni Size – "Strictly Social" (Liquid V, 2004)
- Danism – "Come to You" (BrandNu Recordings, 2004)
- Stress Level & TC1 – "Take Control" (Renegade Recordings, 2004)
- Ikon – "Vai E Vem" (Jalapeño Records, 2004)
- London Elektricity – "Fast Soul Music" (Hospital Records, 2004)
- Shapeshifter – "Long White Cloud" (Truetone Recordings, 2005)
- Hardkandy – "Advice (ft. Terry Callier)" (Catskills Records, 2006)
- Quantic – "Perception" (Tru Thoughts Recordings, 2006)
- Alice Russell – "To Know This" (Tru Thoughts Recordings, 2006)
- Tenorio Jr. – "Nebulosa" (Mr Bongo Recordings, 2007)
- London Elektricity – "This Dark Matter" (Hospital Records, 2008)
- Utah Jazz – "Runaway" (Liquid V, 2008)
- Roni Size – "It's Jazzy" (Liquid V, 2008)
- 4hero – "Look Inside" (Raw Canvas Records, 2008)
- Lenzman – "Caught Up" (Spearhead Records, 2008)
- Shy FX & T Power – Feelings (Digital Soundboy Recording Co., 2008)
- Matrix & Futurebound – "Family" (Metro Recordings, 2008)
- Dekata Project – "At Least We Can Dance" (Doshiwa Records, 2010)
- Devlin (MC) & Yasmin – "Runaway" (Universal Island Records, 2010)
- Jess Mills – "Vultures" (Island, 2011)
- Beardyman – "Where Does Your Mind Go" (Sunday Best Recordings, 2011)
- Unicorn Kid – "Wild Life" (Ministry of Sound, 2011)
- Above & Beyond – "There's a Thing Called Love" (Anjuna Beats, 2011)
- Emeli Sandé – "Heaven" (Virgin, 2011)
- Ms. Dynamite – "Neva Soft" (Relentless, 2011)
- Professor Green – "Read All About It (ft. Emeli Sandé)" (Virgin, 2011)
- Marlon Roudette – "New Age" (Warner, 2011)
- Afrojack & Steve Aoki – "No Beef" (Wall Recordings, 2011)
- Adele – "Rolling in the Deep" (Hospital Records, 2011)
- Emeli Sandé – "Next To Me" (Virgin, 2011)
- Plan B – "Lost My Way" (Atlantic, 2012)
- Professor Green – "Are You Getting Enough?" (Virgin, 2013)
- Itch – "Homeless Romantic" (Red Bull Records, 2013)
- Sick Individuals & Axwell – "I Am" (Virgin, 2013)
- Street Child World Cup feat. London Elektricity, S.P.Y, Diane Charlemagne – "I Am Somebody" (Hospital Records, 2014)
- Tujamo & Plastik Funk ft. Sneakbo – "Dr Who" (3 Beat, 2014)
- BCee – "Back to the Streets" (Spearhead, 2014)
- Billon feat. Maxine Ashley – "Special" (VIP remix features on Future History) (Virgin EMI, 2014)
- Zed Bias feat. Fox – "Something About This" (Hospital Records, 2015)
- Sandy Rivera feat. April – BANG! (Sony Music, 2015)
- TIEKS – "Sunshine" (Hospital Records, 2015)
- Kwabs – "Walk" (Hospital Records, 2017)
- Jonny L – "Bass Break" (Spearhead, 2019)
- Barrington Levy – "Here I Come" (DMC, Hospital Records, 2019)
- Solah - "Time" (Hospital Records, 2026)

=== Production ===
- Jenna G – "Quick Love" (Bingo Beats, 2006)
