= S. P. Y =

S.P.Y
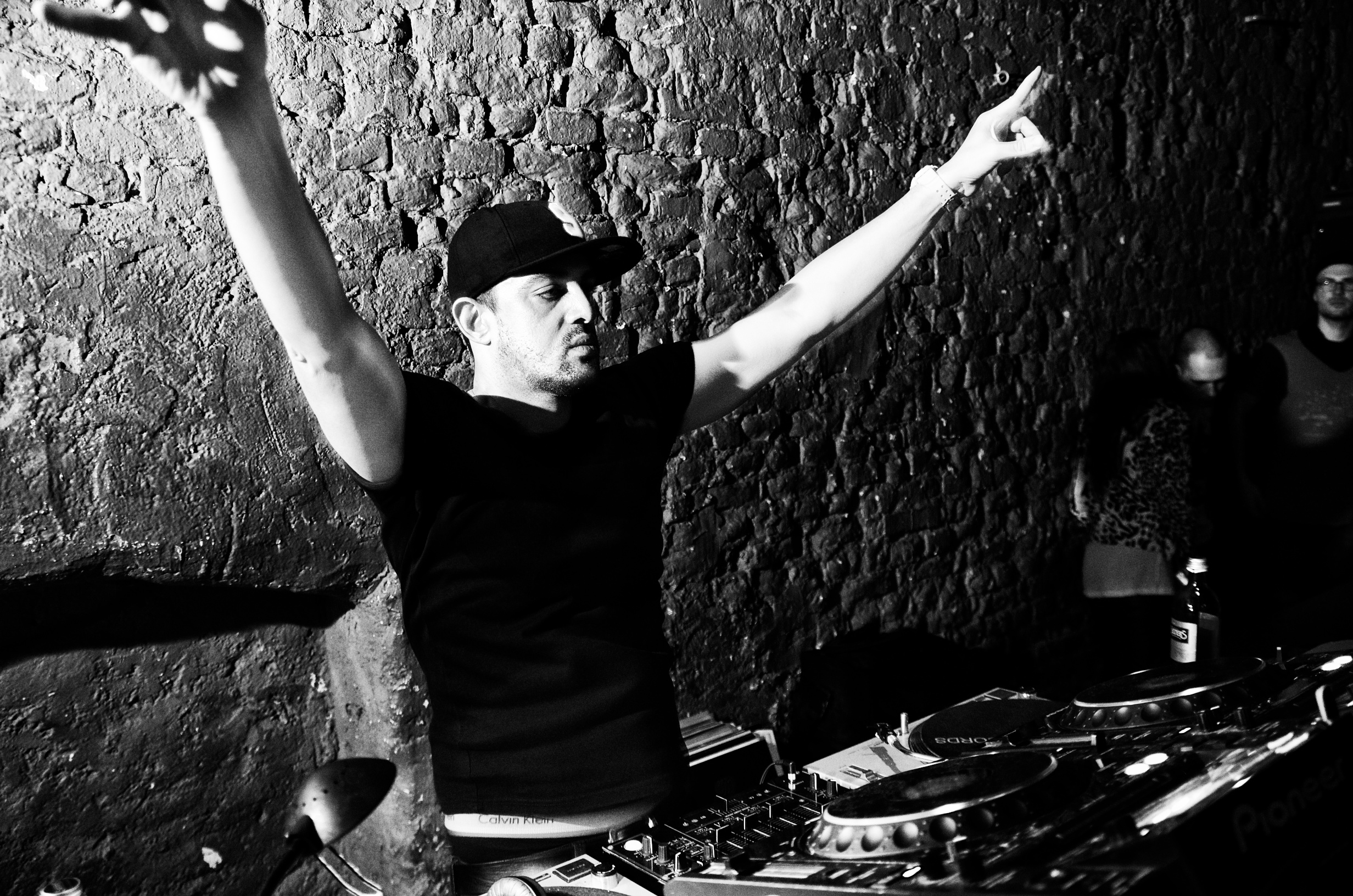
- S.P.Y performing in 2012

Background information
- Born: Carlos Barbosa de Lima Junior; 30 December 1976 (age 49)
- Origin: São Paulo, Brazil
- Genres: Drum and bass; liquid funk; UK garage
- Occupations: DJ; record producer; musician
- Years active: 2005–present
- Labels: Metalheadz, Hospital, Nest HQ
- Website: www.spydnb.com

Carlos Lima, known professionally as S.P.Y, is a Bristol-based Brazilian DJ, record producer and musician from São Paulo, Brazil. He is influenced by genres such as house, UK garage, R&B and the jungle sound. He primarily releases his music through Hospital Records, the UK-based independent drum and bass music label. His DJ name was Spyder, but two months before the release of his first track he had to change it because another producer from America also released an EP under the same name. He left the last three letters out and changed his name to S.P.Y or SPY.

== Music career ==
S.P.Y moved to London from São Paulo initially to pursue a career as graphic designer in 2003. In that time, he hosted a club night in Camden; however, he did not receive any music to play due to the club's modest size. S.P.Y then decided to create music himself, using the Mac he bought for his graphic work.

He got his first single released by Metalheadz in 2005 and with a release on Hospital's Medschool imprint following in 2006. He collaborated with various artist and delivering remixes before signing to Hospital Records in 2012. Hospital released his first album, What the Future Holds. This album won the award in the category "best album" at the Drum & Bass Awards 2012.

In 2013, S.P.Y was selected to write the theme song for the 2014 Street Child World Cup in collaboration with London Elektricity and Diane Charlemagne.

S.P.Y released his second album, Back to Basics in 2014, in two parts because he had a lot of tracks to choose from.

In January 2015, S.P.Y was selected to create the Essential Mix for BBC Radio 1.

== Discography ==
=== Albums ===
Album title	Album details
What the Future Holds	Released: 24 Sep 2012; Label: Hospital Records (NHS219); Format: LP, CD, download
Back to Basics Chapter One	Released: 28 Apr 2014; Label: Hospital Records (NHS252); Format: LP, CD, download
Back to Basics Chapter Two	Released: 1 Sep 2014; Label: Hospital Records (NHS260); Format: LP, CD, download
Hospital Mixtape: S.P.Y	Released: 24 May 2016; Label: Hospital Records (NHS290CD); Format: CD, mixed
Dubplate Style	Released: 29 March 2019; Label: Hospital Records (NHS346CD); Format: CD, mixed

=== Remixes ===
- Friction & Fabio - "Pusherman VIP" (2008)
- The Kox - "Its OK" (2009)
- BCee - "Generations (2009)
- Total Science - "Nosher" (with Marky) (2009)
- deadmau5 - Strobe (with DJ Marky) (2009)
- Total Science - "Squash" (2010)
- Total Science ft. Conrad - "Soul Patrol" (with Marky) (2010)
- Digital + Outrage - "Final Demand" (2010)
- Random Movement - "Can't Resist" (2010)
- Pessimist - "Whispers Of Scandal" (2010)
- DJ Zinc feat. Ms Dynamite - "Wile Out" (with DJ Marky) (2010)
- Redeyes - "My Valentine" (2010)
- London Elektricity - "Elektricity Will Keep Me Warm" (2011)
- Krome & Time - "Ganja Man" (with Total Science) (2011)
- Marco Del Horno fest. Emi Green - "This Town Is Ours" (2011)
- Chase & Status & Sub Focus feat. Takura - "Flashing Lights" (2011)
- Wretch 32 feat. Etta Bond - "Forgiveness" (2011)
- Rufige Kru - "Terminator" (2011)
- Delilah - "Go" (2011)
- True Tiger feat. Professor Green & Maverick Sabre - "In The Air" (2011)
- Zero7 - "In The Waiting Line" (2011)
- Submotion Orchestra - "All Yours" (2012)
- High Contrast - "Wish You Were Here" (2012)
- Siren - "Snorkel" (2012)
- The Others - "The Way You Make Me" (2012)
- Alix Perez - "Annie's Song" (2013)
- Black Sun Empire - "Potemkin" (2013)
- The Upbeats - "Diffused" (2013)
- Chris Malinchak - "So Good To Me" (2013)
- James Zabiela - "Perserverance" (2013)
- Five Knives - "All Fall Down" (2013)
- Camo & Krooked - "Loving You Is Easy" (2013)
- Artificial Intelligence - "Let It Be" (with DJ Marky) (2013)
- Little Dragon - "Underbart" (2014)
- Seinabo Sey - "Hard Time" (2014)
- Etherwood - "Spoken" (2014)
- Lane8 feat. Bipolar Sunshine - "I Got What You Need (Every Night)" (2014)
- Dom & Roland - "Glowbug" (2014)
- Street Child World Cup feat. London Elektricity And Diane Charlemagne - "I Am Somebody" (2014)
- A Sides & MC Fats - "Moment In Time" (2014)
- Sigma feat. Ella Henderson - "Glitterball" (2015)
- Michael Calfan - "Treasured Soul" (2015)
- Enter Shikari - "The Last Garrison" (2015)
- Dimitri Vegas, Moguai & Like Mike Feat. Julian Perretta - "Body Talk (Mammoth)" (2015)
- Pierce Fulton - "Kuaga (Lost Time)" (2015)
- Etherwood- "Souvenirs" (2015)
- Bodhi - "88" (with Shadow Child) (2015)
- Maverick Sabre - "Walk Into The Sun" (2015)
- Tough Love - "So Freakin Tight" (2015)
- Klingande feat. M-22 - "Somewhere New" (2016)
- London Elektricity - "Why Are We Here?" (2016)
- BCee feat. Philipa Hanna - "Back To The Street" (2016)
- Fred V & Grafix - "Ultraviolet" (2016)
- Digital - "Deadline" (2016)
- TC feat. Jakes - "Rep" (2016)
- Fourward - "Over" (2017)
- Metrik - "We Got It" (2017)
- Andy C & Randall - "Sound Control" (2017)
- Macca & Loz Contreras - "Always Yours" (2017)
- Blake & Poly & Bryson - "Temporary Love" (2017)
- DC Breaks - "Never Stop" (2017)
- Congo Natty & Peter Bouncer - "Junglist" (2018)
- Sigma feat. Jack Savoretti - "You And Me As One" (2019)
- Kings Of The Rollers - "You Got Me" (2020)
- Bryan Gee - "Fighter" (2020)
- Shy FX - "Bye Bye Bye" (2020)
- Rag'n'Bone Man - "All You Ever Wanted" (2021)
- Sonic - "Piano Anthem" (2021)
