= The First Note Is Silent =

Single by High Contrast featuring Tiësto and Underworld

from the album The Agony and the Ecstasy
- B-side: "Fearful Symmetry"
- Released: 28 October 2011
- Genre: Drum and bass
- Length: 3:37 (Radio Edit); 5:57 (Original Mix)
- Label: Hospital
- Songwriter(s): Lincoln Barrett; Tijs Verwest; Karl Hyde; Rick Smith
- Producer(s): High Contrast; Tiësto

High Contrast singles chronology
"In-A-Gadda-Da-Vida" / "Forever and a Day" (2010)	"The First Note Is Silent" (2011)	"The Agony and the Ecstasy" (2012)

Tiësto singles chronology
"Maximal Crazy" (2011)	"The First Note Is Silent" (2011)	"What Can We Do (A Deeper Love)" (2011)

Underworld singles chronology
"Diamond Jigsaw" (2011)	"The First Note Is Silent" (2011)	"Caliban's Dream" (2012)

"The First Note Is Silent" is a song by Welsh disc jockey and producer High Contrast in collaboration with Dutch disc jockey and producer Tiësto and Welsh electronic music band Underworld. It was released as digital download and 12" vinyl on 28 October 2011 by Hospital Records in the United Kingdom as the first single from High Contrast's fifth studio album The Agony and the Ecstasy.

== Music video ==
The music video was premiered on High Contrast's official YouTube channel on 7 October 2011. It was directed by High Contrast himself.

== Track listing ==
Digital Download (NHS195DD)

1. "The First Note Is Silent" (Radio Edit) - 3:37
2. "The First Note Is Silent" - 5:57
3. "The First Note Is Silent" (Instrumental) - 5:38
4. "Fearful Symmetry" - 6:00

12" (NHS195)

1. "The First Note Is Silent" - 5:57
2. "Fearful Symmetry" - 6:00

Digital download - Tiësto Remix

1. "The First Note Is Silent" (Tiësto Remix) - 8:10

== Charts ==
Chart (2011)	Peak position
UK Singles (OCC)	48
