= Commix =

- Origin: Cambridge, England, United Kingdom
- Genres: Drum and bass, liquid funk
- Years active: 2002–present
- Labels: Metalheadz, Hospital Records, 31 Records
- Members: George Levings
- Past members: Conrad Whittle; Guy Brewer
- Website: http://www.myspace.com/commix

Commix is an English drum and bass project from Cambridge, now solely composed of George Levings.

== History ==
Based in Cambridge, Commix originally composed of George Levings, Guy Brewer and Conrad Whittle. As a DJ/production team, they began working together in 2002 and the trio released a series of 12-inch singles on the Aquasonic, Tangent Recordings, Good Looking Records, Creative Source and Brand.nu labels, with notable tracks including 2003's "Feel Something", and 2004's "Herbie" and "Surround". After Whittle's departure, Commix was signed to Goldie's label Metalheadz in 2005.

Commix's signature track, "Satellite Song", was featured on the Metalheadz compilation Winter of Content, while two other club favourites ("Urban Legend" and "If I Should Fall") were paired up on a 12-inch single. Their debut album, Call To Mind, was released in summer 2007, to generally positive reviews. Call To Mind was the second release of an artist album on Metalheadz, after Goldie's Rufige Kru alter-ego's Malice in Wonderland. The duo has also notably remixed tracks by artists including Bebel Gilberto, Adam F and DJ Die.

Brewer left the group in March 2012, leaving Levings the only member. Brewer now produces techno under the alias 'Shifted'. In 2016, new material appeared on Commix' SoundCloud page which pays more tribute to sound design rather than on samples. Additionally, the second studio album was announced for release on Metalheadz. The sampler "Generation 1" was released in April 2016, marking the first release after five years.

=== Influences ===
Commix's sound has been influenced by many different musical genres. Their sound features elements of Liquid Funk, Techno, Soul and even House. Levings previously played saxophone, flute and piano, before venturing into the Hip-Hop and electronic music scenes. Similarly, Brewer had a wide-ranging interest in music before being introduced to Drum and Bass.

Levings as a solo artist introduced a style less reliant on samples but rather on sound design. The SoundCloud page states that Commix will prospectively appear "with a renewed sense of purpose".

== Controversy ==
In June of 2023 it was brought to light that George Levings of Commix had been offering music tuition whilst not providing the lessons over a three year period, amounting in ~£10,000 debt owed to 25 people. This has caused the record labels Metalheadz and Hospital Records to remove Commix from their artist rosters, and his actions have caused the Drum and Bass community to distance themselves from the name Commix. The initial information about this controversy was on Dogs On Acid, the main Drum and Bass online forum, with a follow-up video from Weaver Beats on YouTube.

== Discography ==
=== Albums ===
- Call To Mind (2007)
- Dusted (Selected Works 2003-2008) (2012)

=== Compilations ===
- The Future Sound of Cambridge (2004)
- The Future Sound of Cambridge 3 (2008)
- FabricLive.44 (Feb 2009)
- Metalheadz (with Goldie) (2009)
- "Re:Call to Mind" (2010)

=== Singles ===
- "Feel Something / Soul Rebels" (2003)
- "Give You Everything / I'll Take You There" (2003)
- "Something Better / All You Need" (2003)
- "I Want To Know / Hold On Be Strong" (with Logistics) (2004)
- "You'll See / Trojan" (2004)
- "Herbie / Variations" (2004)
- "Take You Higher / Gets Me Higher" (with Greg Packer) (2004)
- "Together" (2004)
- "Brass Eye / Solitude" (with SKC & Bratwa) (2004)
- "Surround / Deep Joy" (2004)
- "Black Queen / Five Reasons (Syncopics Remix) (with Hotbox) (2005)
- "Satellite Song" (2005)
- "Urban Legend / If I Should Fall" (2005)
- "Midas Touch" (2005)
- "Five Reasons" (2005)
- "Providence / Hot Flush" (2005)
- "How You Gonna Feel" (feat. Steve Spacek) (2006)
- "The Perfect Blue" (2006)
- "Be True / Satellite Type 2" (2007)
- "Faceless (Marcus Intalex Remix) / Solvent" (2007)
- "Talk To Frank / Electric" (2007)
- "Envious / Justified" (2009)
- "Double Double" (2011)
- "Generation 1" (2016)
- "Generation 2" (2016)
- "Old School String / Kosmos 2251 / Shine Bright" (2017)
- "Reminisce" (2018)
- "Dispatch Dubplate 12" (2018)
- "Generation 3" (2018)
- "Loves Cruel Game" (2018)
- "Only" (2018)
- "Spaces" (2018)
- "Visions" (2018)
- "Black Sand" (2018
- "Acid Lake" (2018)
- "Destination" (2018)
- "Whatever You Want" (2018)
- "Identify" (2018)
- "Backchat / Games" (2018)
- "Valley Groove / Stuck In A Loop" (with Adred & TC1) (2019)

=== Remixes ===
- DJ Fresh – When The Sun Goes Down (Commix Remix) (2004)
- Bebel Gilberto – Aganjú (2004)
  - (Commix Vocal Mix) (2004)
  - (Commix Dub Mix) (2004)
- DJ Die – Autumn (Remixed by Commix) (2004)
- Suv – Suenos Different (Commix Remix) (2004)
- Vice Versa – Luck of the Draw (Commix Remix) (2004)
- Tactile – Aldabra (Commix Remix) (2006)
- Brooklyn – Stages (Commix Remix) (2006)
- DJ Trax – Tomorrows New Dawn (Commix Remix) (2006)
- Rufige Kru – Is This Real (I'm Not Sure – Remix) (2007)
- The Nextmen – Dig No Wrong (Commix Remix) (2007)
- Origin Unknown – Lunar Bass (Commix VIP) (2008)
- Alex Reece – Basic Principles (Commix Remix) (2010)
- Avalanches – Tonight (Commix Remix) (2012)
- SpectraSoul – Away With Me (CMX Remix) (2013)
- DJ Suv - Suenos Different (Commix Remix) (2015)
- I Wannabe - Dreams (Commix Remix) (2018)
- Data – The Causeway (Commix Remix) (2020)
- Kid Drama – Impulse 1 (Commix Remix) (2021)
