= Etherwood =

- Born: Edward Allen
- Origin: Lincoln, England
- Genre: Drum and bass
- Occupations: Record producer; singer-songwriter; guitarist; remixer
- Years active: 2011–present
- Labels: Hospital; Med School
- Website: etherwood.co.uk

Edward "Woody" Allen is a British record producer and singer-songwriter from Lincoln, England. He has released four studio albums, five singles and numerous remixes under the name Etherwood.

== Biography ==
Edward discovered drum and bass during the late '90s but didn't release his first production until 2012. The first recording to bear his name was a Jakwob and Etherwood remix of Lana Del Rey's "Video Games"; he also played guitar as part of Jakwob's band. He made his proper debut that November, when he appeared on Hospital Records' Sick Music 3 compilation with "Give It Up," an emotive track laced with multiple melodic keyboard lines. The similarly emotive "Spoken" was placed on Hospitality Drum & Bass 2013 in January 2013

His eponymous debut album Etherwood was released on 4 November 2013 through Hospital Records' imprint label Med School. It entered the UK Albums Chart at number 91, the UK Dance Chart at number 4 and the UK Indie Chart at number 11. Allen has also received airplay on BBC Radio 1 and 1Xtra shows. He also peaked at number four on Billboard 's "Next Big Sound" chart, and won the "Best Newcomer DJ" and "Best Newcomer Producer" awards at the 2013 D&B Arena awards. He was described by Nozstock: The Hidden Valley as "undoubtedly one of the most promising young talents in the scene today".

Allen provided guest vocals for Fred V & Grafix's song "Forest Fires", released on 16 June 2014, which entered the UK Singles Chart at number 77. He curated the first of Hospital Records' Hospital Mixtape compilation series, and Hospital Mixtape: Etherwood was released on 23 May 2014.

The lead single from Etherwood's second album, "You'll Always Be a Part of Me", was released on 16 March 2015. It was followed by the second single "Souvenirs" (feat. Zara Kershaw), which was released on 8 June 2015, and the third single "Light My Way Home" (feat. Eva Lazarus), released on 28 August 2015. His second studio album, entitled Blue Leaves, was released on 4 September 2015 and entered the UK Albums Chart at number 47.

Two singles, "Bear's Breeches" (feat. Anile) and "Fire Lit Sky" were released in 2017 before the release of his third album, "In Stillness".

== Discography ==
=== Studio albums ===
Title	Album details	Peak chart positions		
Title	Album details	UK	UK Dance	UK Indie
Etherwood	Released: 4 November 2013; Label: Med School; Format: Digital download, CD, vinyl	91	4	11
Blue Leaves	Released: 4 September 2015; Label: Med School; Format: Digital download, CD, vinyl	47	3	5
In Stillness	Released: 2 March 2018; Label: Med School; Format: Digital download, CD, vinyl	–	–	–
Neon Dust	Released:24 September 2021; Label: Hospital Records; Format: Digital download, CD, vinyl	–	–	–

=== Extended plays ===
Title	Details
Lost in the Right Direction	Released: 14 June 2019; Label: Med School; Formats: Digital Download, vinyl
Isolation Jams	Released: 24 July 2020; Label: Hospital; Formats: Digital Download
Shoreline	Released: 29 August 2024; Label: Stillness Music; Formats: Digital Download

=== Singles ===
==== As lead artist ====
Year	Title	Album
2015	"You'll Always Be a Part of Me"	Blue Leaves
2015	"Souvenirs" (featuring Zara Kershaw)	Blue Leaves
2015	"Light My Way Home" (featuring Eva Lazarus)	Blue Leaves
2017	"Fire Lit Sky"	In Stillness
2017	"Bear's Breeches" (featuring Anile)	In Stillness
2019	"See the Sky" (featuring Thomas Oliver)	Lost in the Right Direction
2020	"Little Bit Lighter" (with BCee and Charlotte Haining)	Life as We Know It
2021	"I Will Wave to You" / "Heterize"	Neon Dust
2021	"Lighthouse" (featuring Zara Kershaw)	Neon Dust
2021	"Dahlia"	Neon Dust
2021	"Follow the River" (featuring Lily Budiasa)	Neon Dust
2024	"Lucid"	Shoreline
2024	"Where the Flowers Grow" (featuring Zara Kershaw)	Shoreline
2024	"Illuminate" (featuring Riya)	Shoreline
2025	"Sinking Sand"	TBA
2025	"Evermade" (with LSB)	TBA
2025	"Tangara" (with Hugh Hardie)	Non-album single
2025	"Deep Dive"	TBA

==== As featured artist ====
Year	Title	Peak chart positions			Album
Year	Title	UK	UK Dance	UK Indie	Album
2014	"Forest Fires" (Fred V & Grafix featuring Etherwood)	77	23	5	Recognise
2020	"Fall Beneath You" (Keeno featuring Etherwood)	—	—	—	I Live, I Learn
2021	"Bloodstream" (In:Most featuring Etherwood)	—	—	—	Cloud Nine
"—" denotes single that did not chart or was not released in that territory.

=== Promotional singles ===
Year	Title	Album
2015	"Amen Roadtrip"	Hospitality 2015
2015	"Sunlight Splinters"	Blue Leaves

=== Other appearances ===
Year	Title	Album
2012	"Give It Up"	Sick Music 3
2013	"In the Moment"	Hospital Christmas Cracker 2013
2016	"Eyes on Me" (Etherwood & Royalston)	Ten Years of Med School
2017	"Because of You" (S.P.Y & Etherwood)	Hospital: We Are 21
2018	"Haltija"	Forza Horizon 4: Hospital Soundtrack
2018	"Coming Back" (Electrosoul System & Etherwood)	Electrosoul System Presents: LiquiDNAtion (Vol. 2)
2018	"Latida"	Hospital Christmas Cracker 2018
2019	"Take the Flame" (Royalston featuring Etherwood)	Voodoo Love Dance
2020	"American Fruity"	Sick Music 2020
2020	"Nowhere to Go But Everywhere"	Med School: Graduation
2020	"Do You Ever" (DRS and Dynamite featuring Etherwood)	Playing in the Dark
2021	"Naperone"	Forza Horizon 5: Hospital Soundtrack
2023	"More to Life" (Visionobi featuring Etherwood)	Weather the Storm
2023	"Outro" (Visionobi featuring Etherwood)	Weather the Storm
2024	"Subliminal" (Fred V and Etherwood featuring FJ Law and Allknight)	Luminous
2024	"Got Me Falling" (Etherwood and Blean)	Headsbass: Volume 14
2024	"We Felt It"	Liquidcity: Lunar

=== Remixes ===
Year	Song	Artist
2011	"Video Games" (with Jakwob)	Lana Del Rey
2011	"Right Beside You"	Jakwob
2012	"Electrify"	Jakwob featuring Jetta
2012	"For My Sins"	Jess Mills
2012	"Moon Kids"	Laurelle & Alexander
2013	"Fade"	Jakwob featuring Maiday
2013	"Fade" (Etherwood VIP)	Jakwob featuring Maiday
2013	"Mess Around"	Indiana
2014	"All Night"	Camo & Krooked
2014	"Ready for Your Love"	Gorgon City featuring MNEK
2014	"Cut Your Teeth"	Kyla La Grange
2014	"Forest Fires"	Fred V & Grafix featuring Etherwood
2014	"War Rages On"	Alex Clare
2014	"Heart Weighs a Ton"	Alex Metric featuring Stefan Storm
2014	"Light in the Dark"	SpectraSoul featuring Terri Walker
2015	"Alone No More"	Philip George & Anton Powers
2015	"Never Let Go of the Microscope"	Enter Shikari
2016	"Blurred Memories"	Bop & Synkro
2016	"Sycamore"	John Metcalfe
2016	"What the Future Holds"	S.P.Y featuring Ian Shaw
2016	"Impossible to Say"	London Elektricity featuring Pete Simpson
2018	"We Know"	Hunrosa
2019	"Better Half of Me"	Tom Walker
2021	"Anywhere Away from Here"	Rag'n'Bone Man & Pink
2021	"Anywhere Away from Here" (Etherwood 138 Remix)	Rag'n'Bone Man & Pink
2022	"Morning Sun"	Terror & Jim Lawton
2022	"Nothing More"	Askel & Elere featuring YENAIS
2022	"Coming Down"	Maduk
2022	"Giving It Out"	Above & Beyond featuring Zoë Johnston
2024	"In My Head"	Artybr>featuring Jay Sorrow
2024	"From the Ashes"	Alpha Rhythm
