= Fade (Jakwob song) =

Single by Jakwob featuring Maiday
- Released: 15 March 2013
- Recorded: 2012–13
- Genre: Trip hop; electronica
- Length: 3:23
- Label: Boom Ting Recordings

Jakwob singles chronology
"Blinding" (2012)	"Fade" (2013)

"Fade" is a song by British music producer and DJ Jakwob, with vocals courtesy of Maiday. The song was released as a single on 15 March 2013 as a digital download in the UK. The song peaked at number 35 on the UK Singles Chart.

== Music video ==
A music video to accompany the release of "Fade" was first released onto YouTube and VEVO on 10 February 2013 at a total length of three minutes and twenty-six seconds. The music video was directed by Billy Boyd Cape and features a performance from Nicole O'Neill. In just 40 days the video peaked 1 million views. As of May 2020, its view count is over 3.5 million.

== Track listing ==
Digital download
No.	Title	Length
1.	"Fade" (Vocal) (feat. Maiday)	3:23
2.	"Fade" (Instrumental) (feat. Maiday)	3:18
3.	"Fade" (Wilkinson Remix) (feat. Maiday)	4:44
4.	"Fade" (Etherwood Remix) (feat. Maiday)	5:11

Digital download – remix EP
No.	Title	Length
1.	"Fade" (Club VIP) (feat. Maiday)	5:14
2.	"Fade" (Club Mix) (feat. Maiday)	6:00
3.	"Fade" (Etherwood VIP) (feat. Maiday)	5:51
4.	"Fade" (feat. Maiday) (video)	3:26

== Chart performance ==
On 24 March 2013 the song entered the UK Singles Chart at number 35, becoming his first top 40 single in the UK. On 14 April 2013 the song re-entered the Top 40 at 37.

=== Weekly charts ===
Chart (2013)	Peak position
Belgium (Ultratip Bubbling Under Flanders)	16
UK Dance (OCC)	6
UK Indie (OCC)	5
UK Singles (OCC)	35

== Release history ==
Country	Release date	Format	Label
United Kingdom	15 March 2013	Digital download	Boom Ting Recordings
