= High Society (High Contrast album) =

Studio album by High Contrast
- Released: 20 September 2004
- Length: 72 minutes approx.
- Label: Hospital Records
- Producer: High Contrast

High Contrast chronology
True Colours (2002)	High Society (2004)	FabricLive.25 (2005)

Professional ratings
Review scores
Source	Rating
AllMusic	3.5/5 stars
Resident Advisor	4/5

High Society is the second album from the Welsh drum and bass producer High Contrast, released in 2004 on the Hospital Records label.

== Composition ==
The album has been described as drum & bass with elements of samba, jazz, 2-step, bossa nova, hip-hop, rare groove and Detroit techno. The album features collaborations with Dynamite MC of Reprazent, Spoonface and Nolay.

== Reception ==
BBC gave a positive review of the album, praising the album for its genre blending and a warm sound. Resident Advisor described the album as "easy, accessible tunes featuring melodies and rhythms that don't sound too poppy or commercial, yet not hard enough to scare newbies away," recommending the album to fans of liquid drum & bass and Hospital Records. DJ Mag opined that the album's success contributed to High Contrast's increasing prominence. The album became the top selling drum & bass album in the UK in 2004.

== Track listing ==
1. Lovesick – 7:14
2. Tutti Frutti – 6:06
3. High Society (featuring Dynamite MC) – 5:25
4. Brief Encounter – 5:44
5. Racing Green – 6:46
6. Angels and Fly (featuring NoLay) – 5:12
7. Natural High – 6:25
8. The Persistence of Memory – 6:29
9. Twilight's Last Gleaming – 7:36
10. Only Two Can Play (featuring Spoonface) – 4:32
11. Yesterday's Colours – 5:50
12. The Basement Track – 5:41
