= Hospitality in the Park =

British music festival

Coordinates: 51.571°N 0.101°W

Hospitality in the Park is an outdoor one-day music festival held annually in Finsbury Park, London, England. Held since 2016, when it launched it was the first outdoor event in the UK based solely around drum and bass music.

Taking place over the course of a single day, previous festivals have featured over 150 artists and performers spread across a multitude of arenas, representing the spectrum of drum and bass music. Despite the increased maximum capacity of 12,000 revellers, every event so far has sold-out.

Hospitality in the Park is run by record label Hospital Records. The festival attracts a worldwide audience, with many people travelling great distances to reach the event. Record label boss Tony Colman (aka London Elektricity) offered a prize at the 2017 event for the guests who had travelled furthest to get there. Entrants included people from all over Europe, visitors from California and Canada, and the eventual winners, who had come from Australia and New Zealand respectively.
