= The Agony and the Ecstasy (album) =

Studio album by High Contrast
- Released: 12 February 2012
- Genre: Drum and bass
- Label: Hospital

High Contrast chronology
Confidential (2009)	The Agony and the Ecstasy (2012)	The Road Goes On Forever (2012)

The Agony and the Ecstasy is the fifth album by Welsh drum and bass producer High Contrast, released on 12 February 2012 on the Hospital Records label. It was preceded by 2009's Confidential.

The release earned favorable reviews from publications such as The Leader, in which writer Emma Mackintosh labeled the album as "short and to the point" while also telling readers to "give this a couple of listens" for sure.

== Track listing ==
1. "The Agony & The Ecstasy" (featuring Selah Corbin)
2. "The Road Goes On Forever"
3. "Wish You Were Here" (featuring Selah Corbin)
4. "Almost Human" (featuring Clare Maguire)
5. "The Only Way There" (featuring Selah Corbin)
6. "The First Note Is Silent" (featuring Tiësto and Underworld)
7. "Emotional Vampire"
8. "Two Hundred & Thirty Eight Days" (featuring Underworld)
9. "Not Waving, But Drowning" (featuring Jessy Allen and Lung)
10. "Father, Can't You See I'm Burning?"
11. "The Stand"
12. "All There Is" (featuring Liane Carroll)
