= Nu:Logic =

- Origin: Cambridge, England
- Genres: Drum and bass; melodic drum & bass
- Years active: 2003–present
- Labels: Hospital Records
- Members: Dan Gresham (Nu:Tone); Matt Gresham (Logistics)

Nu:Logic is a collaboration between drum and bass producer brothers Dan Gresham (Nu:Tone) and Matt Gresham (Logistics), both of Cambridge, England.

== History ==
=== 2003-2013: Beginnings and What I've Always Waited For ===
Their first release, "Warriors/Not the Only One", in 2003 was the first release which Matt Gresham was involved in, and in 2004, they were featured on Hospital Records' Weapons of Mass Creation Vol. 1. From then on, Logistics and Nu:Tone went on as solo artists until 2010 saw the release of their New Technique EP. This was followed by continued solo work until they collaborated once more in 2013 with the single "Morning Light" which was released 25 March 2013 on their first together produced LP, called What I've Always Waited For. On 17 June 2013, they released the single "Everlasting Days" (ft. Lifford), which included the track "We Live There" (ft. DRS), from their album.

=== 2017-present: Somewhere Between the Light ===
In May 2017, Nu:Tone posted a picture of the art work of Nu:Logic's new album Somewhere Between the Light, scheduled to be released on 30 June 2017 on Hospital Records. Additionally, "Side by Side", a song included in the album, was premiered on BBC Radio 1.

== Discography ==
=== Albums ===
- What I've Always Waited For (2013)
- Somewhere Between the Light (2017)

=== Singles ===
- "Weapons of Mass Creation LP" (2004)
- "New Technique EP" (2010)
- "Morning Light / Grizzly" (2013)
- "Everlasting Days / We Live There" (feat. Lifford; feat. DRS) (2013)
- "Watercolours" (2016)
- "The Sound of Your Smile" (2018)

=== Remixes ===
- Logistics – "We Are One" (2012)
- Electric Guest – "This Head I Hold" (2013)
- Birdy – "Wings" (2014)
- Wilkinson – "Flatline" (2016)
- Camo & Krooked – "Like I Do (feat. James Hersey)" (2017)
- Netsky – "Iron Heart" (2019)
- Jimmy Riley & Tarrus Riley - Pull Up Selector (2019)
