= True Colours (High Contrast album) =

Studio album by High Contrast
- Released: 28 October 2002
- Genre: Drum and bass
- Label: Hospital
- Producer: High Contrast

High Contrast chronology
True Colours (2002)	High Society (2004)

Professional ratings
Review scores
Source	Rating
AllMusic	4/5 stars

True Colours (released in the United States as True Colors) is the debut studio album by Welsh drum and bass producer High Contrast. Disc 1 is unmixed, and later released as a single CD album. The second disc is mixed and features most of the tracks of the first disc, and also includes the tracks "Suddenly" and "Full Intention."

== Track listing ==
=== Disc one ===
1. "Return of Forever" – 8:19
2. "Music Is Everything" – 7:29
3. "True Colours" – 6:08
4. "Global Love" – 6:11
5. "Exposé" – 6:20
6. "Passion" – 5:48
7. "Make It Tonight" – 6:25
8. "Remember When" – 7:17
9. "Savoir Faire" – 6:10
10. "Fools Gold" – 6:46
11. "Mermaid Scar" – 7:23

=== Disc two ===
1. "Music Is Everything" – 4:27
2. "Global Love" – 2:13
3. "Savoir Faire" – 2:57
4. "Suddenly" – 2:57
5. "Remember When" – 3:41
6. "Passion" – 2:13
7. "True Colours" – 5:21
8. "Mermaid Scar" – 4:54
9. "Return of Forever" – 7:01
10. "Exposé" – 3:53
11. "Full Intention" – 5:55
12. "Make It Tonight" – 6:36
