= Bachelors of Science (group) =

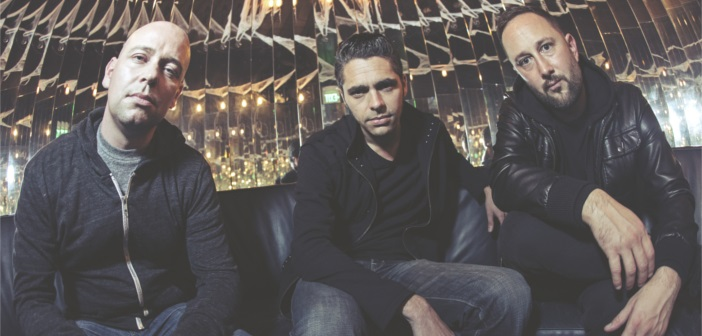

Background information
- Origin: San Francisco, California, U.S.
- Genres: Drum and bass, liquid funk
- Years active: 2006–present
- Labels: CODE Recordings
- Members: Phil "Rene" Collis; Chris Doe; Lukeino Argilla
- Website: bachelorsofscience.com

Bachelors of Science is the stage name of Phil "Rene" Collis, Chris Doe and Lukeino Argilla. They met in California and formed a successful act, quickly becoming one of the top drum and bass producers in the electronic music scene. Focusing primarily on the subgenre of liquid funk, Bachelors of Science have released multiple albums and singles to critical acclaim, gaining airplay from DJs such as Brian Gee, Bailey, LTJ Bukem, Grooverider, Annie Mac, High Contrast, Doc Scott, Flight, Alix Perez, DJ Lee, Redeyes, Makoto, State of Mind, JuJu, BigBud and L Double.

Their track, "Bachelors of Science – Strings Track (Apex Remix)" has been awarded "Best Drum & Bass Track" at the 2009 beatport Music Awards.

In 2012, Bachelors of Science launched their record label CODE Recordings.

== Discography ==
=== Albums ===
- Science Fiction (2008)
- Remixes Vol 1 (2009) [Collection of remixes and unreleased rarities during the Science Fiction project]
- Warehouse Dayz (2010)
- Remixes Vol 2 (2011)
- The Space Between (2015)
- Within This Moment (2022)

=== Singles ===
- "The Pressure" (2006)
- "Rhodes Ahead" (2006)
- "Jah No Dead" (2006)
- "Stages" (Commix Remix) / "Wicked Ways" (2006)
- "Science Fiction" LP Sampler (2007)
- "Ask You Why" / "Jah No Dead" (Atlantic Connections Remix) (2008)
- "Strings Track" (Apex Remix) (2008)
- "Song for Lovers" / "Spanish Sun" (Bungle Remix) (2009)
- "Song for Lovers" (Lynx Remix) / "Match Point" (2009)
- "Warehouse Dayz" LP Sampler (2010)
- "Pakistan Flood Relief EP" (2010)
- "Beast / Morning Sun" (2012)
- "Beats Still Own The Rhythm" (2014)
- "Don't Hold Back" / "Cartier" (2014)

=== Remixes ===
- Seasick Steve - "The Jungle" (2009)
- Death Cab for Cutie - "Brothers on a Hotel Bed" (2009)
- The XX - "Infinity" (2010)
- Robyn - "None of Dem" (2010)
- Home Video - "Every Love That Ever Was" (2011)
- Silver Swans - "Best Friend in Love" (2011)

=== Compilations ===
- Kings of Drum & Bass: mixed by 4Hero and DJ Marky (2010)
- Drum & Bass Arena Summer Anthems (2009)
- Drum & Bass Arena Anthems (2009)
