= Right Beside You (Jakwob song) =

Single by Jakwob featuring Smiler
- Released: 8 May 2011
- Recorded: 2011
- Genre: Electronic
- Length: 3:09
- Label: Mercury Records

Jakwob singles chronology
"Here With Me" (2010)	"Right Beside You" (2011)	"Electrify" (2012)

"Right Beside You" is a song by British electronic producer Jakwob from his upcoming debut studio album. The song was released as a single on 8 May 2011 as a digital download in the United Kingdom. It features raps from Smiler, and the chorus's vocals provided by Nikki Ambers from SoundGirl.

== Music video ==
A music video to accompany the release of "Right Beside You" was first released onto YouTube on 3 June 2011 at a total length of three minutes and twenty seconds.

== Track listing ==
UK Digital download
No.	Title	Length
1.	"Right Beside You" (Original Version)	3:09
2.	"Boomer"	3:27
3.	"Right Beside You" (DJ Fresh Future Jungle Remix)	4:56
4.	"Right Beside You" (Jakwob V.I.P Mix)	4:19

== Chart performance ==
Chart (2011)	Peak position
Belgium (Ultratop 50 Flanders)	18

== Release history ==
Country	Release date	Format	Label
United Kingdom	8 May 2011	Digital download	Island Records
