= Random Movement =

DJ and drum and bass musician

- Origin: Winter Haven, Florida, United States
- Genres: Drum & Bass; Breakbeat
- Occupations: Record Producer, DJ
- Years active: 2003–present
- Labels: Flight Pattern, Innerground Records, Soul:r, Liquid V, C.I.A, Integral
- Members: Michael Richards
- Past members: Jack Sheets (aka "Mister Shifter")
- Website: www.randommovement.org

Random Movement is the stage name of DJ and drum and bass musician Michael Richards. As a recording artist, he has many releases on Innerground Records, Fokuz Recordings, V Recordings, and his own label, Flight Pattern.

== Biography ==
In 2003, Richards and Jack Sheets (aka "Mister Shifter") founded Random Movement. Jack Sheets later left in 2006.

In 2009, he started regularly releasing DJ mixes through his own podcast.

== Discography ==
=== Albums ===
- 2009: Lucky Guess (Innerground Records)
- 2019: Lost On Purpose (Flight Pattern)

=== EPs/LPs ===
- 2008: Her Song EP (Innerground Records)
- 2011: Back In My Life EP (Driven AM Recordings)
- 2012: The Note From Next Door EP (Phuzion Digital)
- 2015: Sleazy Bitch EP (Fokuz Recordings)
- 2015: Meat Sauce EP (Fokuz Recordings)
- 2015: Ruffled Feathers EP w/ MixMaster Doc (Fokuz Recordings)
- 2015: God Complex EP (Innerground Records)
- 2016: Suggestions EP (Fokuz Recordings)
- 2017: Life Is Permanent EP (Flight Pattern Records)
- 2017: Hit The Ground Running EP w/ Jaybee (Flight Pattern Records)
- 2018: Patterns Vol. 1 w/ Atlantic Connection (Flight Pattern Records)
- 2018: Patterns Vol. 2 w/ Atlantic Connection (Flight Pattern Records)
- 2022: The Remember Sessions Vol. 1 (Flight Pattern Records)
- 2022: The Remember Sessions Vol. 2 (Flight Pattern Records)
- 2022: The Remember Sessions Vol. 3 (Flight Pattern Records)
- 2023: The Remember Sessions Vol. 4 (Flight Pattern Records)
- 2023: The Remember Sessions LP (Flight Pattern Records)

=== Singles ===
Year	Release	Label
2005	Stars In The Dark / Struggle To The Grave	Bassbin
2005	Love Nights / Red	Innerground Records
2005	What A Woman / Lifegiver	Orgone Recordings
2006	Scarlet Trouble / Methods Of Thought (with Focus)	Bingo Beats
2006	Time To Rock / Morning Glory	Bassbin
2006	Infinite / They Locked Me Down	Progress
2006	Stare At The Sun / Last Nights Dream	Timeless Recordings
2006	Intersections PM / Wise Words (with Kubiks & Lomax)	Progress LTD
2007	Reaching Deeper / Face To Face	Creative Source
2007	Thick Liquid / Sabina	Innerground Records
2008	Groove Thing / How Many Ways	Future Retro
2008	Believe No Other / The Student	Westbay International
2008	Till' Doomsday / Lesson & Aftermath	C.I.A. Deep Kut
2009	Scotch Bonnet / P Style (with Squash)	Intrigue Music
2009	Rattled System / Big Changes	Integral Records
2009	Flag Man / Ain't Going Nowhere (with BCee)	Future Retro
2010	Lucky Guess Album Sampler Part 1	Innerground Records
2010	Lucky Guess Album Sampler Part 2	Innerground Records
2011	Many Things / Perpetual (with Ben Soundscape)	Intrigue Music
2011	Risk / Easy On The Motion (with Mutt & Calculon feat. Kevin King)	Rubik Records
2011	Risk VIP / Heard It In My Head	Rubik Digital
2011	2 Dogs Down / Follow My Own Path Dig My Own Grave	Influence Records
2012	Essential Forms (Klute Remix) / Same Ol' Me (with Mute & Mako, Jaybee)	Mars Recordings
2012	Feelings Translated / Dirt Dobber	Innerground Records
2013	Sounds Of The Innerground Part 2 (with DIalogue)	Innerground Records
2013	Corrupt Level / Alone This Way (No Need To Stay)	Good Looking Records
2013	Dancing Feat / I'm Nobody's Fool	Rubik Records
2014	Ahead Of It All / When The Daylight Comes	V Records
2014	Dancing Feat (Remixes)	Rubik Records
2015	Girl / Future Blues	Occulti Music
2016	Saturated Fats (with Mixmaster Doc)	Peer Pressure
2016	Same Old Feelings	Intrigue Records
2016	You Got Somethin' / Future Fondler	Flight Pattern
2016	I Stayed Around (Lenzman Reinterpretation) / Meet You There	Fokuz Recordings
2016	Nobody's Business (If I Do)	Prestige Music
2017	Life Is Permanent	Flight Pattern
2017	Many Things / Perpetual (with Ben Soundscape)	Intrigue Music
2017	Scotch Bonnet / P Style (with Squash)	Intrigue Music
2021	Patty Melt	Innerground Records
2023	Melon Rind	Galacy Records

=== Remixes ===
- 2008: Peyo & Cloud Nine – That's What You Do to Me
- 2009: DJ Marky & Makoto – Secret Place
- 2010: Dan Marshall – Smoke And Mirrors
- 2013: Technicolour & Komatic feat. Jayma – Vermillion
- 2013: XRS & MC Fats – Lovin
- 2013: Makoto – Girl I'm Running Back 2 U
- 2013: Dynamic & Command Strange – A Girl Like You
- 2014: Kill Paris feat. Marty Rod – Silence Of Heartbreak
- 2014: Vigorous – Pain & Sorrow
- 2014: DJ Chap – Let Me Love You
- 2014: Clart & Kalum – Musical Paradise
- 2015: Simplification – Love Forever
- 2015: Lurch – Confessions
- 2015: Blockwork – Morning Music
- 2015: Rowpieces – Super Soul
- 2015: Vandera feat. Lickz – Ring The Alarm
- 2015: Broken Drums – Smile
- 2015: Malaky & Skeletone & Satl – Future Blues
- 2015: Dub FX – Run
- 2016: Oktiv & AudioSketch – Come For Me
- 2016: Surplus – Do It
- 2016: Bachelors Of Science – On The Line
- 2016: DJ Chap – Let Me Love You
- 2016: Akuratyde – Still Perfect
- 2016: Blade – Moments and Memories
- 2016: DJ Chap – Let Me Love You
- 2016: Simplification & Translate – Come Back
- 2018: Technicolour & Komatic – Vermillion
- 2018: Bert H & High N Sick – Salat
- 2018: Noisefloor Feat. Angel Stamford – My Heart
- 2019: Skeletone & Critical Event Feat. LaMeduza – Hard Times
- 2019: Actraiser – Starsigns
- 2020: Flaco – You Should Be Here (with Makoto)
- 2020: Akuratyde – Plume
- 2020: Bank – Breathless
- 2021: Nuex – Lucid Nights
- 2021: Melinki – It's Over
- 2021: T.R.A.C. – Invisible Sounds
