= Electrify (song) =

Single by Jakwob featuring Jetta
- Released: 2 March 2012
- Recorded: 2011
- Length: 3:44
- Label: Mercury Records
- Songwriter(s): Rocky Nti, James Jacob, Steve Jones.

Jakwob singles chronology
"Right Beside You" (2011)	"Electrify" (2012)	"Blinding" (2012)

"Electrify" is a song by British DJ and producer Jakwob. The song, lyrics written by Rocky Nti, James Jacob and Steve 'Dub' Jones was released as a single on 2 March 2012 as a digital download in the United Kingdom. It features vocals from Jetta, and incorporates sample replays of Indian music recreated by UK producer Mark Summers of SCORCCiO Sample Replays.

== Music video ==
A music video to accompany the release of "Electrify" was first released onto YouTube on 23 January 2012 at a total length of three minutes and forty-six seconds.

== Track listing ==
UK Digital download
No.	Title	Length
1.	"Electrify"	3:44
2.	"Electrify" (Jakwob's V.I.P. Mix)	4:06
3.	"Electrify" (Cyantific Remix)	4:49
4.	"Electrify" (Seamus Haji's Big Love Remix)	6:18
5.	"Electrify" (Mike Delinquent Remix)	4:48
6.	"Electrify" (Sega Bodega Remix)	5:14
7.	"Electrify" (Etherwood Remix)	4:42

== Chart performance ==
Chart (2012)	Peak position
UK Dance (OCC)	27
UK Singles (Official Charts Company)	130

== Release history ==
Country	Release date	Format	Label
United Kingdom	2 March 2012	Digital download	Mercury Records
