= Keeno =

- Born: Will Keen; 26 February 1994 (age 32)
- Origin: Winchester, Hampshire, England
- Genres: Drum and bass; orchestral
- Occupations: Record producer; remixer
- Years active: 2010-present
- Labels: Hospital; Med School; Liquid Tones; Subsphere; Influenza Media; Keeno Music

Will Keen (born 26 February 1994), known by his stage name Keeno, is a British record producer and DJ from Winchester, known for adding orchestral elements to drum and bass. His debut album, Life Cycle, was released on 30 June 2014 through Hospital Records' imprint label Med School. It entered the UK Albums Chart at number 198, the UK Dance Chart at number 13 and the UK Indie Chart at number 34. Keeno has also received airplay on BBC Radio 1 and 1Xtra drum and bass shows.

His song "Nocturne", released on 9 December 2013, was used as the title screen for the 2014 racing game Forza Horizon 2.

Keeno's second album, Futurist, was released on his 22nd birthday, 26 February 2016. The album's first instant grat single, "At Twilight", was released on 12 February 2016.

He released his third studio album, All the Shimmering Things, in November 2017.

After the closure of Hospital Records' MedSchool imprint, Keeno was taken under contract with Hospital Records in 2019 and in March 2020, his first single, "Troopers Peak / Old School Lane" was released on the label. His fourth studio album, titled I Live I Learn was released on 27 November 2020.

== Personal life ==
From the age of seven, Keen took part in a choir. He went to Winchester College and later studied music at the University of Manchester, although he left in January 2015 prior to graduation in order to pursue his music career full-time.

== Discography ==
=== Studio albums ===
Title	Album details	Peak chart positions		
Title	Album details	UK	UK Dance	UK Indie Breakers
Life Cycle	Released: 30 June 2014; Label: Med School; Format: Digital download, CD, vinyl	198	13	5
Futurist	Released: 26 February 2016; Label: Med School; Format: Digital download, CD, vinyl	—	18	13
All the Shimmering Things	Released: 3 November 2017; Label: Med School; Format: Digital download, CD, vinyl	—	5	—
I Live I Learn	Released: 27 November 2020; Label: Hospital; Format: Digital download, CD, vinyl	—	—	—
LIGHT / DARK	Released: 26 June 2026; Label: Keeno Music; Format: Digital download, CD, vinyl	—	—	—

=== Extended plays ===
Title	Details	Track listing
Sweetest Sin (with Whiney)	Released: 17 September 2012; Label: Subsphere; Formats: Digital download	"Sweetest Sin" (with Whiney); "One More Time" (with Whiney featuring Louisa Bass); "Doesn't Matter"; "Fire" (with Whiney)
Nocturne	Released: 9 December 2013; Label: Med School; Formats: Digital download	"Nocturne"; "Tunnels" (featuring Louisa Bass); "Hold Ya" (featuring Whiney); "Whispers of the Waves" (featuring Louisa Bass); "Green Flash"; "Golden Light"
Preludes	Released: 13 April 2015; Label: Med School; Formats: Digital download, Vinyl	"One More Moment" (featuring Cepasa); "Origin"; "The Moon Under the Water"; "Dignity Found" (with Whiney)
Music for Orchestra: Drums & Bass	Released: 7 April 2017; Label: Med School; Formats: Digital download, Vinyl	"Enigma"; "Shelter from the Storm" (featuring Rou Reynolds); "Fading Fast"; "Insomnia of an Anxious Mind"
Troopers Peak / Old School Lane	Released: 11 March 2020; Label: Hospital Records; Formats: Digital download	"Troopers Peak"; "Old School Lane"
Fall Beneath You (feat. Etherwood) / Equinox	Released: 19 June 2020; Label: Hospital Records; Formats: Digital download	"Fall Beneath You"; "Equinox"
Courage	Released: 17 March 2023; Label: Keeno Music (self-released); Formats: Digital download	"Hypnotised (ft. Diandra Faye)"; "Courage"; "Disappear (ft. Fæ Vie)"; "Frenzy (ft. Vio.let)"; "Lights On"; "Colours of Your Heart"; "Hypnotised (ft. Diandra Faye) (Cinematic Mix)"; "Lights On (Cinematic Mix)"; "Disappear (ft. Fæ Vie) (Cinematic Mix)"

=== Singles ===
Year	Title	Album
2010	"Winding" / "Hurt"	Non-album singles
2011	"The View" / "You Know That Feelin' When"	Non-album singles
2012	"Rephrase & Rewind" (featuring Fifi Smart)	Non-album singles
2013	"Little Son"	Non-album singles
2013	"Tinderbox"	Non-album singles
2017	"All the Shimmering Things"	All the Shimmering Things
2017	"Light Cascading" (featuring Becca Jane Grey)	All the Shimmering Things
2017	"Cosmic Creeper"	All the Shimmering Things
2020	"Behind the Glass" (featuring Kate Wild)	Non-album singles
2024	"Perfect Memory"	Non-album singles

=== Promotional singles ===
Year	Title	Album
2013	"Nocturne"	Life Cycle
2014	"As One" (featuring Pat Fulgoni)	Life Cycle
2014	"Innocence"	Life Cycle
2014	"Scripted" (featuring Louisa Bass)	Life Cycle
2016	"At Twilight"	Futurist

=== Other appearances ===
Year	Song	Release	Label
2012	"No More" (with Whiney)	Sick Music 3	Hospital
2013	"Painted"	Access	Limitless
2013	"Isokime"	New Blood 013	Med School
2014	"Scripted (VIP)" (featuring Louisa Bass)	Hospital Christmas Cracker 2014	
2015	"Dignity Found" (with Whiney)	Hospitality 2015	
2015	"Ranua" (Muffler featuring Keeno)	Stone Cold	Spearhead Records
2015	"Artificial Skin" (London Elektricity featuring Keeno and Emer Dineen)	Are We There Yet?	Hospital
2017	"Never Too Long (Whiney featuring Keeno)"	Talisman	Med School
2018	"While The World Sleeps"	Forza Horizon 4: Hospital Soundtrack	Hospital
2018	"Brave Face"	Forza Horizon 4: Hospital Soundtrack	Hospital
2019	"Kosa (Makoto featuring Keeno)"	Tomodachi Sessions	Hospital
2020	"Still Beautiful (DRS x Dynamite MC featuring Keeno x Obsel)"	Playing In The Dark	Hospital
2021	"Wobbo Dub" (Degs featuring Whiney x Unglued x Keeno x Royalston)"	Mixtape Sprayout, Vol. 2	Hospital
2021	"Communications"	Forza Horizon 5: Hospital Soundtrack	Hospital
2024	"Indispensable"	Lunar	Liquicity
