= Fred V & Grafix =

English drum and bass duo

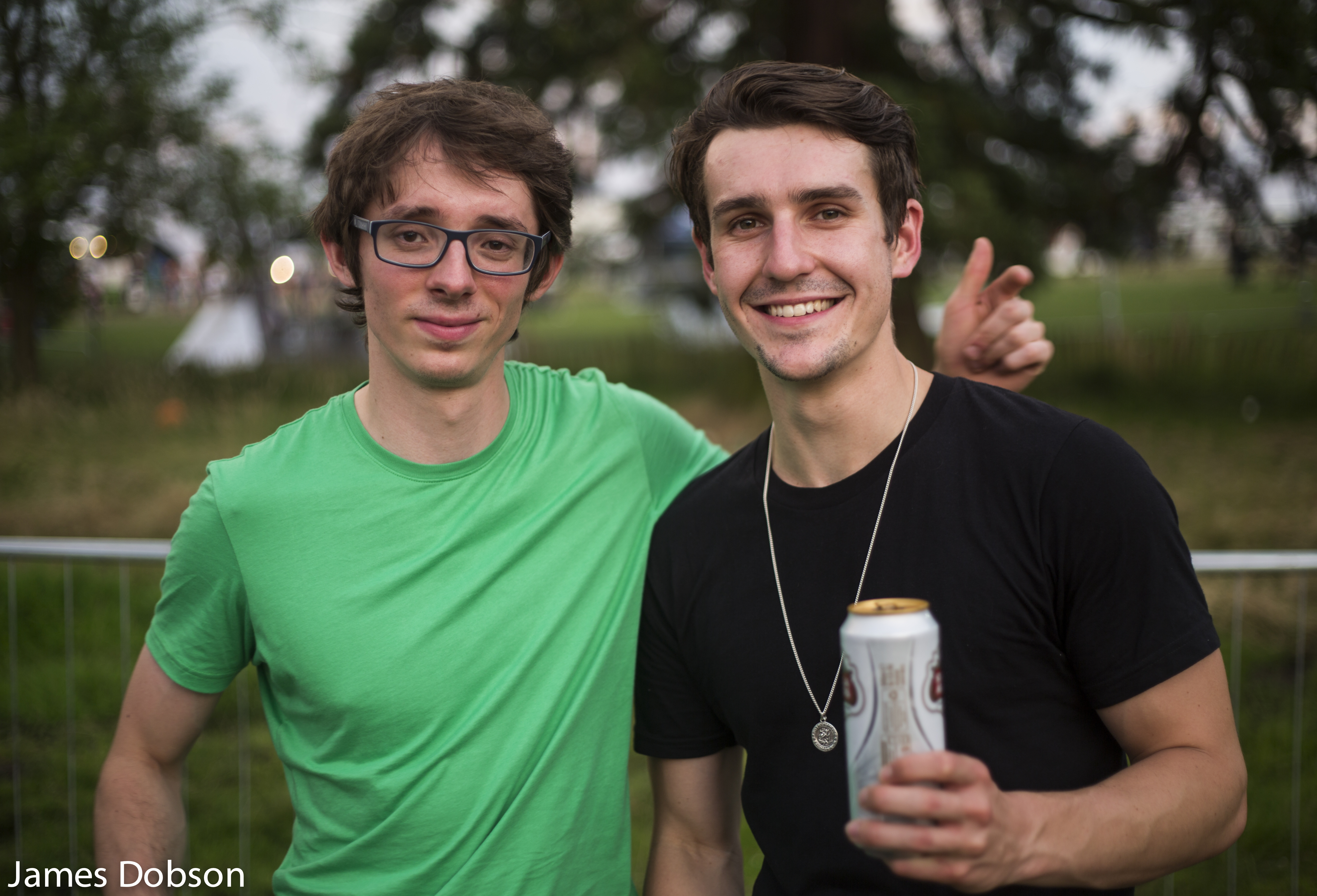
- Fred V and Grafix in 2014

Background information
- Origin: Exeter, Devon, England, United Kingdom
- Genre: Drum and bass
- Years active: 2009–2018, 2026-Current
- Label: Hospital
- Members: Frederick Vahrman (Fred V); Joshua Jackson (Grafix)

Fred V & Grafix are an English drum and bass duo made up of Frederick "Fred V" Vahrman (born 12 January 1990) and Joshua "Grafix" Jackson (born 14 June 1991). The duo was signed to Hospital Records and hailed from Devon, England. They have guested on BBC Radio 1 shows including Annie Mac. They released their debut album Recognise in 2014, which entered the UK Albums Chart at number 106. The album's second single "Forest Fires" (featuring Etherwood) entered the UK Singles Chart at number 77.

In December 2018, the duo announced their split and the continuation of their solo careers.

On 11 May 2026, Drum and Bass record label Hospital Records (who Fred V and Grafix were signed to prior to their split) hinted at the duos possible imminent return in an Instagram post on both Fred V and Grafix and Hospital Records pages.

On 12 May 2026, Fred V and Grafix officially confirmed their return with the revival of the track 'Rain is Falling', the last track they worked on (but never released) as a duo seven years ago before their split. The song features vocals from Lottie Jones, who has previously been a vocalist on multiple of Fred V's independent songs.

== Discography ==
=== Studio albums ===
Title	Details	Peak chart positions		
Title	Details	UK	UK Dance	UK Indie
Recognise	Released: 31 March 2014; Label: Hospital Records; Formats: Digital download, CD	106	11	21
Oxygen	Released: 24 June 2016; Label: Hospital Records; Formats: Digital download, CD	163	7	20
Cinematic Party Music	Released: 29 September 2017; Label: Hospital Records; Formats: Digital download, CD	—	—	—

=== Extended plays ===
Title	EP details	Tracks
Goggles	Released: 11 March 2013; Label: Hospital Records; Formats: Digital download	1. "Goggles"; 2. "Games People Play"; 3. "Denmark Road"; 4. "Basilisk"

=== Singles ===
Year	Single	Peak chart positions			Album
Year	Single	UK	UK Dance	UK Indie	Album
2009	"Groove Melon"	—	—	—	Non-album singles
2011	"Long Distance" / "Room to Breathe"	—	—	—	Non-album singles
2012	"Just a Thought" (featuring Reija Lee)	—	—	—	Non-album singles
2013	"Here with You" / "Minor Happy" (featuring Collin McLoughlin)	—	—	—	Non-album singles
2014	"Recognise"	—	—	—	Recognise
2014	"Forest Fires" (featuring Etherwood)	77	23	5	Recognise
2016	"Ultraviolet" / "Comb Funk"	—	—	—	Oxygen
2016	"Like the Sun"	—	—	—	Oxygen
2017	"Hurricanes (Wild Love)"	—	—	—	Cinematic Party Music
2017	"Sugar"	—	—	—	Cinematic Party Music
2017	"Colours Fading"	—	—	—	Cinematic Party Music
"—" denotes single that did not chart or was not released.

=== Remixes ===
Year	Artist	Song	Label
2011	Emeli Sandé (featuring Naughty Boy)	"Daddy"	Virgin Records
2011	C.J. Bolland	"Camargue"	Control
2012	Camo & Krooked	"All Fall Down"	Hospital Records
2012	Wretch 32 (featuring Ed Sheeran)	"Hush Little Baby"	Ministry Of Sound / Jewels
2012	Rudimental (featuring John Newman)	"Feel the Love"	Asylum Records / Black Butter Records
2012	Daddy's Groove & Little Nancy	"It's Not Right, But it's Okay"	Strictly Rhythm Records
2012	Skepta	"Hold On"	Hospital Records
2012	Madeon	"Icarus"	popcultur / Columbia
2013	Sub Focus (featuring Alex Clare)	"Endorphins" (with Sub Focus)	RAM Records
2014	Netsky (featuring Beth Ditto)	"Running Low"	Sony Music Entertainment
2014	MNEK	"Every Little Word"	Ministry Of Sound
2014	Hybrid	"Be Here Now"	Sony Computer Entertainment Europe
2015	Secondcity (featuring Ali Love)	"What Can I Do"	Ministry Of Sound
2015	Kele	"Closer"	Wichita
2015	Carmada	"Maybe"	Owsla / Circus
2016	Philip George & Dragonette	"Feel this Way"	3 Beat
2016	Mat Zo (featuring Sinead Egan)	"The Enemy"	Mad Zoo
2016	Dabin (featuring Daniela Andrade)	"Hold"	Kannibalen
2016	Dillon Francis (featuring Will Heard)	"Anywhere"	Sony Music Entertainment
2017	Stanton Warriors (featuring Eska)	"Still Here"	Punks Music
2017	Bakermat (featuring Kiesza)	"Don't Want You Back"	Sony Music Entertainment
2018	Becky Hill	"Sunrise In the East"	Polydor / Eko
2018	Camo & Krooked (featuring ROBB)	"Slow Down"	RAM / Mosaik

=== Other appearances ===
Year	Song	Release	Label
2011	"One of These Days"	Outcast EP	Mainframe Recordings
2011	"Decades"	Make Way for the New Generation	Talkin Beatz
2011	"White Lies"	Make Way for the New Generation	Talkin Beatz
2011	"Find My Way"	Fifteen Years Of Hospital Records	Hospital Records
2012	"Major Happy"	Sick Music 3	Hospital Records
2012	"Vanishing Point"	Hospital Christmas Cracker 2012	Hospital Records
2013	"Purple Gates"	Hospitality Drum & Bass 2013	Hospital Records
2013	"Downpour (Lush Guitar)"	Hospital Christmas Cracker 2013	Hospital Records
2014	"Catch My Breath" featuring Kate Westall	We Are 18	Hospital Records
2015	"Major Happy VIP"	Hospital Mixtape: Fred V & Grafix	Hospital Records
2015	"This Can't Wait"	Hospital Mixtape: Fred V & Grafix	Hospital Records
2016	"Constellations"	Hospitality Drum & Bass 2016	Hospital Records
2017	"Tension" (with Metrik)	We Are 21	Hospital Records
2018	"Auckland Sunrise"	Forza Horizon 4: Hospital	Hospital Records
2018	"Sunrise"	Forza Horizon 4 (Unreleased song)	
2026	"Rain Is Falling"	Hospital30	Hospital Records
