= MC D.R.S. =

British rapper

DRS (Dirty Rap Scallion) is a British rapper, born Delroy Pottinger. He was one third of UK hip hop trio, Broke 'n' £nglish, and has collaborated with the likes of Calibre, Marcus Intalex, Lynx, LTJ Bukem, Icicle and LSB and the late MC Conrad.

In the 1990s, he landed a spot as the resident MC at Club Xtreme and came into contact with drum and bass artist LTJ Bukem and rapper MC Conrad. He was one of only a few rappers at the time who could keep up with the fast speed of drum and bass, and went on to appear on many of Bukem's tracks.

He released his debut LP I Don't Usually Like MC's But... on Manchester drum n bass label Soul:R. The album featured production from a host of drum n bass names including dBridge, Lynx, Marcus Intalex, Genotype, Dub Phizix, S.P.Y and Enei.

His second LP, Mid Mic Crisis (2015), was also released on Soul:R.

In 2018 and 2020, he released two EP's for the label Space Cadet, titled Space Cadet and Space Cadet II, respectively. Both EP's feature drum and bass artists such as Mozey, Zero Tolerance, and Skeptical.

In 2019, He collaborated with drum and bass DJ and producer LSB on the album The Blue Hour.
