= High Contrast =

Welsh musical artist (born 1979)

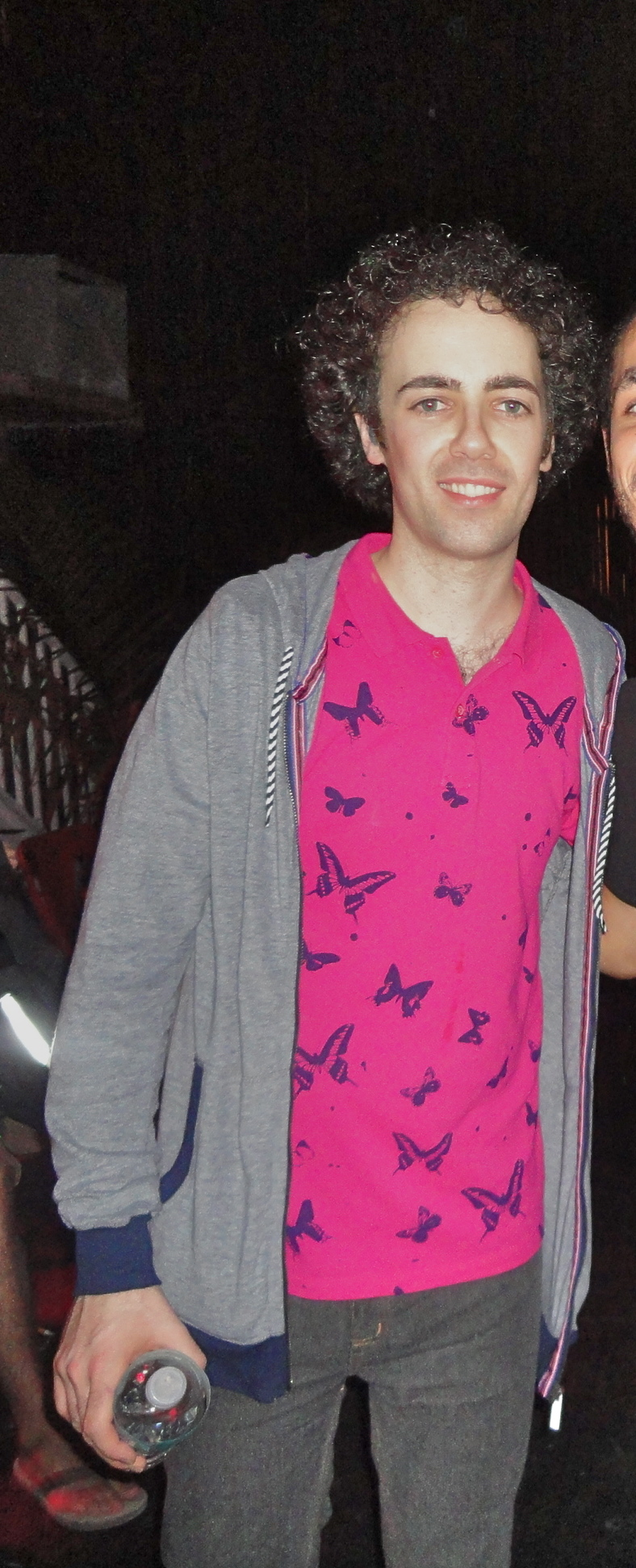
- High Contrast in Miami, Florida (2011)

Background information
- Born: Lincoln Barrett; 18 September 1979 (age 47); Penarth, Vale of Glamorgan, Wales
- Genres: Drum and bass; liquid funk
- Years active: 2000–present
- Labels: Hospital; 3Beat

Lincoln Barrett (born 18 September 1979), better known by the stage name High Contrast, is a Welsh electronic music producer, DJ and record producer. He produces drum and bass music, and his 2009 album Confidential reached BPI gold certification (100,000 units sold in the UK).

== Career ==
=== Early work ===
Barrett was born in Penarth, near Cardiff, and grew up more interested in films and film soundtracks than rock or pop music; he cites Wendy Carlos's A Clockwork Orange soundtrack album and the Vangelis soundtrack for Blade Runner as defining musical influences. Whilst studying film making in Newport, he heard J Majik's Arabian Nights which turned the then 17-year-old Barrett on to drum and bass music. Barrett used to work in Cardiff's only electronic record shop, Catapult. A short time after he began to make music, he was given a DJ residency at Cardiff's drum and bass night, named Silent Running. During his residency at Silent Running, Barrett played alongside artists such as Grooverider and London Elektricity.

=== 2000s ===
In June 2002, Barrett's debut album, True Colours, was released on Hospital Records, with "Return of Forever" and "Global Love" finding their way into the UK Singles Chart. His second album was High Society.

On 6 April 2003, High Contrast was featured on the BBC Radio 1 Essential Mix show. His mix included liquid funk mostly from the Hospital Records label. On 9 January 2005, this Essential Mix was replayed on Radio 1 when another drum and bass artist, Andy C, was unable to deliver his mix. In October 2005, Barrett launched his own record label, The Contrast. The first single, "Days Go By" / "What We Do" was released in early November 2005.

In 2007, he delivered his second effort, selected as "Essential Mix of the Year" by Pete Tong. His third album Tough Guys Don't Dance was released in October 2007. The second single from the album, "If We Ever", was supported on Radio 1 by Annie Mac, Zane Lowe and Jo Whiley helping it to reach number 1 in the DnB chart, number 1 in the dance chart and number 4 in the Indie chart.

In 2008, High Contrast remixed the #1 single "No Way to Say" for Japanese pop singer Ayumi Hamasaki's remix album, Ayu-mi-x 6: Silver. He also made successful remixes of "Hometown Glory" by Adele and "Pjanoo" by Eric Prydz, which were later included on the album, Confidential. He played them during his take over for the Rob Da Bank show on BBC Radio 1 in January 2009.

=== 2010s ===
He played at the 2011 Coachella Valley Music and Arts Festival. Barrett currently is a resident DJ at the following clubs: Aperture at Clwb Ifor Bach (The Welsh Club) in Cardiff; and at Roxy in Prague. He was also on regular rotation at Fabric in London.

High Contrast played a key role in selecting and producing the music for the Athletes Parade at the 2012 Summer Olympics opening ceremony. Half a dozen tracks by High Contrast were played and are present in the event's official soundtrack, Isles of Wonder.

In July 2014, High Contrast's new single with Clare Maguire "Who's Loving You" was announced. A double release, 'Part 2' was Special Delivery on Annie Mac's BBC Radio 1 show, followed by 'Part 1' as "Hottest Record in the World" for Zane Lowe.

In 2015, he remixed the R&B track "Muhammad Ali" by the group Faithless. The same year, the mix was included in the group's '2.0' remix album release, and also incorporated into the second half of their live performances of the song.

He signed with 3Beat in April 2016 and released his first single on the label, "Remind Me".

In 2017, a new song, titled "Shotgun Mouthwash", was featured on the T2 Trainspotting soundtrack.

High Contrast's remix of "The One" by Jorja Smith was Nominated for a Grammy at the 62nd Annual Grammy Awards

=== 2020s ===
On 13 November 2020, he released the album titled Notes From The Underground.

On 24 June 2022, he followed up with the album titled True Colours for the first time on his own label Highly Contrasting.

On 23 February 2024, he released a single with two songs Anti/Thesis Vol. 1.

== Personal life ==
His father, Paul "Legs" Barrett, used to manage Shakin' Stevens. His mother, Lorraine Barrett, was the Welsh Assembly member for Cardiff South and Penarth until May 2011.

Lincoln is a vegan.

== Discography ==
=== Albums ===
- True Colours (2002)
- High Society (2004)
- Tough Guys Don't Dance (2007)
- The Agony and The Ecstasy (2012) (UK #45)
- Night Gallery (2017)
- Notes from the Underground (2020)
- Restoration (2024)

=== Compilation albums ===
- FabricLive.25 (2005)
- Watch the Ride - High Contrast (2008)
- Hospitality Presents This is Drum + Bass (2009)
- Confidential (2009) (UK #68), BPI: Gold
- Isles of Wonder (2012)
- Derestoration (2025)

=== EPs ===
- The Road Goes On Forever (EP) (2012)
- Questions (EP) (2017)

=== Singles ===
Year	Single	Peak chart positions	Certifications	Album
Year	Single	UK	Certifications	Album
2001	"Make It Tonight" / "Mermaid Scar"	—		True Colours
2001	"Passion" / "Full Intention"	—		True Colours
2002	"Return of Forever"	—		True Colours
2002	"Global Love"	68		True Colours
2003	"The Basement Track"	65		High Society
2004	"Twilight's Last Gleaming"	74		High Society
2004	"Angels and Fly" (featuring NoLay)	—		High Society
2004	"Racing Green" / "St. Ives"	73		High Society
2005	"When the Lights Go Down" / "Magic"	—		Non-album single
2005	"Days Go By" / "What We Do"	—		Non-album single
2007	"Everything's Different" / "Green Screen"	—		Tough Guys Don't Dance
2007	"If We Ever" / "Pink Flamingos"	—	BPI: Silver	Tough Guys Don't Dance
2007	"In-A-Gadda-Da-Vida" / "Forever and a Day"	—		Tough Guys Don't Dance
2011	"The First Note Is Silent" (featuring Tiësto and Underworld)	48		The Agony and the Ecstasy
2012	"The Agony and the Ecstasy" (featuring Selah Corbin)	—		The Agony and the Ecstasy
2012	"The Road Goes On Forever"	—		The Agony and the Ecstasy
2013	"Spectrum Analyser" / "Some Things Never Change"	—		Non-album single
2014	"Who's Loving You" (featuring Clare Maguire)	—		Non-album single
2016	"How Love Begins" (with DJ Fresh featuring Dizzee Rascal)	58		Non-album single
2016	"Remind Me"	—	BPI: Silver	Night Gallery
2017	"Shotgun Mouthwash"	—		Night Gallery
2017	"Questions" (featuring Boy Matthews)	—		Night Gallery
2017	"The Beat Don't Feel the Same" (featuring Boy Matthews)	—		Night Gallery
2017	"Save Somebody" (featuring Callum Beattie)	—		Night Gallery
2018	"God Only Knows"	—		Non-album single
2019	"Days Go By (2019)"	—		Non-album single
2019	"Going Up"	—		Notes from the Underground
2019	"Snare the Blame"	—		Notes from the Underground
2020	"Time is Hardcore" (featuring Kae Tempest and Anita Blay)	—		Notes from the Underground
2020	"Rhythm is Changing" (featuring LOWES)	—		Notes from the Underground
2021	"Met Her at a Dance in Leicester" (featuring UK Apache and Ady Suleiman)	—		Notes from the Underground
2021	"Bourgeious Imagery" (with Alan Fitzpatrick)	—		Machine Therapy
2021	"Don't Need You" (with Bou)	—		Non-album single
2022	"Kiss Kiss Bang Bang"	—		Non-album single
2023	"Can't Give You Up"	—		Non-album single
2023	"You Don't Understand" (feat. Jamie McCool)	—		Non-album single
2024	"Anti/Thesis: Vol. 1"	—		Non-album single
2024	"Be No Rain"	—		Restoration
2024	"Loved You So"	—		Restoration
2024	"Happy People"	—		Restoration
2024	"Remember Me"	—		Restoration

=== Remixes ===
- "What Do You Believe In?" by Rag'n'Bone Man
- "Pictures in My Head" by M.J. Cole
- "Edge of Seventeen" by Stevie Nicks
- "Kaleidoscope" by Tiesto
- "Wall" by Enter Shikari
- "Baggy Bottom Boys" by Jokers of the Scene
- "Ready for the Weekend" by Calvin Harris
- "In for the Kill (Skream's Let's Get Ravey Mix)" by La Roux
- "Most Precious Love" by Blaze featuring Barbara Tucker
- "Hometown Glory" by Adele
- "Pjanoo" by Eric Prydz
- "Reload It" by Kano
- "Time to Pretend" by MGMT
- "Something Good '08" by Utah Saints
- "Papua New Guinea" by Future Sound of London
- "I Found U" by Axwell
- "It's Too Late" by The Streets
- "Talk" by Coldplay
- "Gold Digger" by Kanye West
- "Flashing Lights" by Kanye West
- "We Run This" by Missy Elliott
- "My Dreams" by London Elektricity featuring Robert Owens
- "Remember the Future" by London Elektricity
- "Headlock" by Imogen Heap
- "Barcelona" by D.Kay & Epsilon
- "Hey U" by Basement Jaxx
- "Thugged Out Bitch" by Dillinja
- "Girls & Boys (Aquasky song)" by Aquasky and El Horner
- "Renegade Snares" by Omni Trio
- "Back for More" by Influx Datum
- "Karma (Comes Back Around)" by Adam F & Guru
- "No More" by Roni Size featuring Beverley Knight and Dynamite MC
- "No Soul" by ILS
- "Spaced Invader" by Hatiras
- "This Feeling" by Blue Sonix
- "Born Free" by M.I.A.
- "Blue Orchid" by The White Stripes
- "Show Me Love" by Robin S.
- "Run" by Joel Compass
- "California Love" by 2Pac featuring Dr. Dre
- "Let Go for Tonight" by Foxes
- "Love On a 45" by MJ Cole
- "The One" by Jorja Smith
- "So Many People" by Two Door Cinema Club
- "Ultraviolet" by Freya Ridings
- "Leave a Light On" by Tom Walker
- "Sometimes the Going Gets a Little Tough" by Finn
- "Savage" by MIST
- "The Difference" by Flume
- "Freedom" by Sub Focus & Wilkinson featuring Empara Mi (Remix vs. Sub Focus & Wilkinson)
- "Mine Right Now" by Sigrid
- "Better Off Without You" by Becky Hill featuring Shift K3Y
- "24/7" by NOISY
- "Lord It's a Feeling" by London Grammar
- "Paradise" by James Vincent McMorrow
- "Foreign Things" by Amber Mark
- "No Bad Days by Bastille
- "Stella" by Housty
- "listen up" by SOLOMON
- "Beyond Horizons" by Anna Phoebe
- "Definition Of Happy" by Nitin Sawhney feat. I Am Roze
