= Total Science =

British drum & bass duo

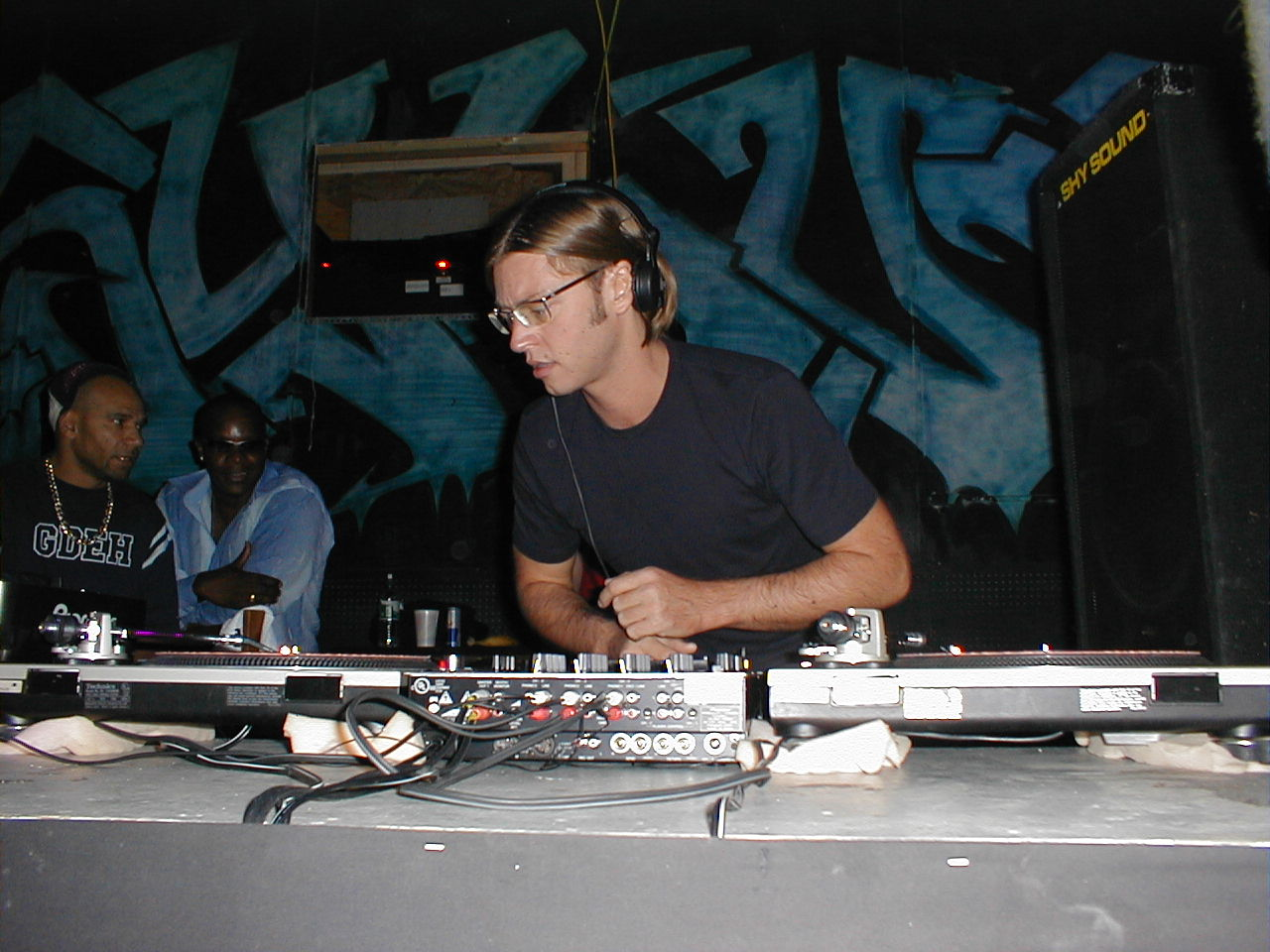
Part of drum n bass duo Total Science

Total Science is the stage name of drum and bass producers Jason Greenhalgh and Paul Smith.

The pair first met in 1987, both living on Blackbird Leys estate in Oxford, England and brought together through a mutual love of hip hop. Distracted by the arrival of hardcore in the early nineties, the pair's record collecting was quickly followed by DJing, and eventually production. Greenhalgh launched his career under the moniker Q Project with "Freestyle Fanatic" in 1991. In 1994, the pair started recording together under the name Funky Technicians, with "You Gotta Believe" the first in a series of records which pushed the label away from the darkside movement and toward labels like Lucky Spin, Basement, and Good Looking. After six years of recording singles for others, the pair established the CIA label in the closing months of 1997 with the help of Brillo from Timeless Recordings. The release of their Silent Reign EP for Goldie's Metalheadz was another important release for the project, coming before a Bad Company remix of "Champion Sound" for their own label. Their debut album, Advance, was released in 2000, and featured downtempo experiments logged as a series of "Breaks" on the majority of their early EPs.

Jason Greenhalgh (AKA Q Project) is well known for his release "Champion Sound", a popular jungle anthem of the 1990s.

== Discography ==
- Advance (2000)
- Audio Works 01 (2001)
- Audio Works 03 (2002)
- Audio Works 04 (2002)
- Audio Works 02 (2003)
- Audio Works 05 (2003)
- Audio Works 06 (2004)
- Good Game (2004)
- Mars Needs... Total Science (2006)
- See Your Face (2013)
