= Hospital Records =

British independent record label

- Founded: 1996
- Founder: Tony Colman; Chris Goss
- Distributors: Proper Music Distribution (Physical); Believe Music (Digital)
- Genre: Drum and bass; electronic; liquid funk; breakbeat
- Country of origin: UK
- Location: Shoreditch, East London
- Official website: hospitalrecords.com

Hospital Records is a British independent record label based in East London. Primarily releasing drum and bass, the label was started in 1996 by Tony Colman (London Elektricity) and Chris Goss and has grown to become one of the most well-known labels within UK dance music. The label has been home to artists including Netsky, Camo & Krooked, Logistics, Nu:Tone, Metrik, Fred V & Grafix, High Contrast, and S. P. Y and releases music from across the DnB genre. In Shoreditch, East London, Hospital runs the publishing company Songs in the Key of Knife and their worldwide events brand, Hospitality. Until the end of 2019, Hospital also ran an experimental label called Med School Music.

== Hospitality ==
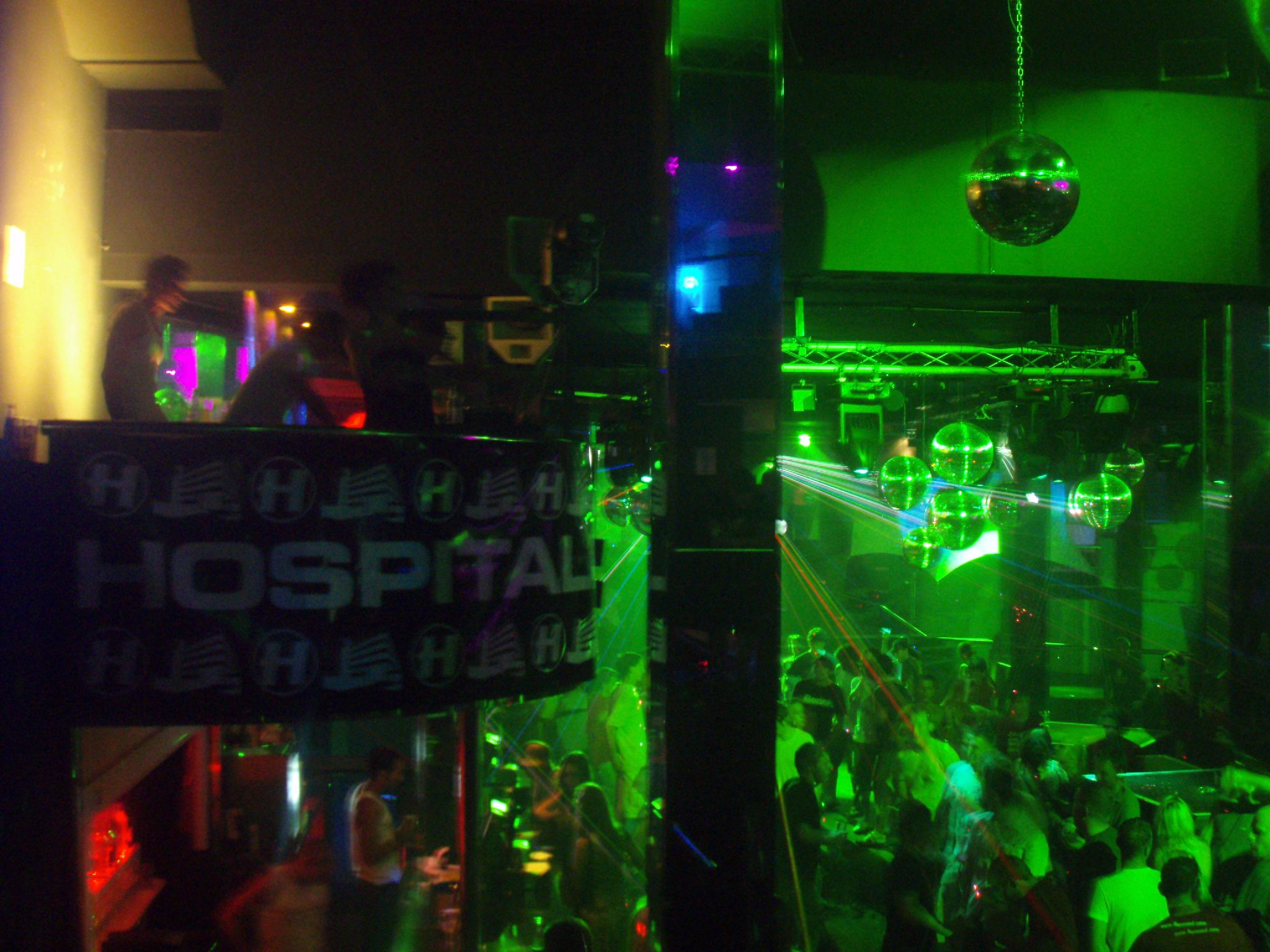
A Hospitality night at Heaven Ibiza, 2007

'Hospitality' is Hospital Records's event brand. Drum and bass events involving a set of artists from the label are often advertised as 'Hospitality' events, with events and festivals such as 'Hospitality Brixton', 'Hospitality In The Woods' & Hospitality 'On The Beach'.

In 2014 Hospital Records celebrated its 18th birthday by revisiting some of the venues it had used for past Hospitality events. The first event took place at 02 complex in Greenwich, London. This was formerly the Matter nightclub. On 4 May Hospitality visited Heaven near Charing Cross station in central London.

In 2017, the label turned 21, a milestone marked by the release of a 'best of' compilation album featuring a selection of tracks produced by the label during its lifetime. Named 'We are 21', the album was released as a precursor to a year of planned events celebrating the breadth and variety of the entire drum and bass spectrum. These include the follow-up to 2016's award-winning Hospitality in the Park festival in London's Finsbury Park, where a sold-out crowd of over 10,000 watched more than 100 artists performing across 5 stages in a single day. The festival marked a step into unknown territory for the label, is by far the largest Hospitality event ever planned. The day was later described by label boss Tony Colman (Aka London Elektricity) on his weekly podcast as, "One of the best days of my life."

Hospitality in the Park 2017 set out to be even more ambitious. 2,500 extra tickets were made available, taking the crowd capacity up to 12,500. Despite this, the event sold out once more. With many more performers than at even the record-breaking 2016 event – this time appearing in one of eight different arenas – the festival further broadened its already eclectic focus. Hospitality in the Park has returned for the following 2 years.

Other big events for the label included the sold-out Hospitality in the Dock, which took place in April 2017 in London's sprawling Grade I listed tobacco dock. This was the biggest indoor event ever held by Hospital Records, again showcasing a wide variety of acts across a number of stages. Hospitality in the Dock built on the success of Hospitality in the Park 2016 and further underlined the importance of the label to both the industry and the genre. The unprecedented size, scale, and success of these events have cemented the reputation of Hospital Records as one of the leading players in the industry.

In 2018, another main event, Hospitality on the Beach, took place at The Garden Resort in Tisno, Croatia. The event was a 5-day beach festival that included boat parties, beach-side stages as well as sets featuring artists from the Hospital and Med School labels, along with many other artists from other labels such as Critical Music and Spearhead Records. The event has returned for 2019 and will also return for 2020.

Hospital Records provides a number of compilation albums throughout the year named 'Hospitality'. The albums contain tracks, VIP mixes, and remixes from both artists of the label as well as artists outside the label, such as Genetic Bros, Cyantific, Sub Zero, and TC. All of the albums contain about 30 tracks, as well as a mix (mixed by recognised DJs such as London Elektricity, Stanza, and Tomahawk) containing all of the tracks in the album.

== Sublabels and subsidiaries ==
=== Soulvent Records ===
In May 2020, Hospital Records first showed interest to support Drum-and-bass label Soulvent Records. In June 2022, it was announced that the label will join Hospital as an imprint.

=== Songs in the Key of Knife ===
Working in partnership with long-established music publishers Fairwood Music Ltd, Nichion Inc and Westbury Music Ltd, Songs in the Key Of Knife makes every effort to develop the careers of both established and emerging writers whilst maximising the potential of their works. The artists signed to these publishing deals may or may not be directly affiliated with Hospital Records.

=== Clinic Talent ===
In 2015 Hospital created its in-house booking agency, Clinic Talent. Clinic Talent manages bookings for a range of DJs, MCs, and live acts, some signed to Hospital and some from other labels. Acts include Hospital CEO London Elektricity. Clinic Talent is managed by Blu Mar Ten.

=== Med School ===
In 2006, an imprint particularly designed for newcomers was set up, some of which were S.P.Y., Keeno and Etherwood. The label ceased operations in 2019.

== Artists ==
The following musicians are signed to Hospital Records and/or its sublabels.

- Anaïs
- Askel & Elere
- Blu Mar Ten
- Bop
- Camo & Krooked
- Cyantific
- MC Conrad
- Danny Byrd
- Degs
- Doktor
- Dynamite MC
- Emz
- Enei
- Etherwood
- Flava D
- Fred V
- Gabriella Bongo
- Grafix
- High Contrast
- Hugh Hardie
- Imo-Lu
- Inja
- In:Most
- Ivy
- Iyre
- Kanobie
- Keeno
- Kings of the Rollers
- Lens
- Logistics
- London Elektricity
- Makoto
- Metrik
- Mitekiss
- Netsky
- Nu:Logic
- Nu:Tone
- P Money
- S. P. Y
- Solah
- Stay-C
- Subten
- Subwave
- Sudley
- Sweetie Irie
- T-Man
- MC Tempza
- Unglued
- Urbandawn
- Visionobi
- Voltage
- Whiney
- Winslow

== Podcast and Forza ==
Tony Colman was the original host of the Hospital Records Podcast. He was occasionally joined by a guest from the label or an up-and-coming unsigned artist. Colman often played demos from budding producers on the podcast.

Starting in April 2022, the Hospital-signed DJ Degs took over as the main host of the podcast.

The podcast has won the BT Digital Music Award for Best Podcast in 2006, 2007 and 2008.

From Forza Horizon 2 to 4, Colman and fellow founder Chris Goss appeared on in the in-game radio station for Hospital Records. Colman stopped appearing in the series after Horizon 4, with Goss' co-host being Degs for Forza Horizon 5 and Dynamite MC for Forza Horizon 6.

== Awards ==
From 2009 to 2011 and 2014 to 2021, Hospital Records has won the Best Label title at the Drum & Bass Arena Awards.
