= Dance music =

Music composed specifically to facilitate or accompany dancing

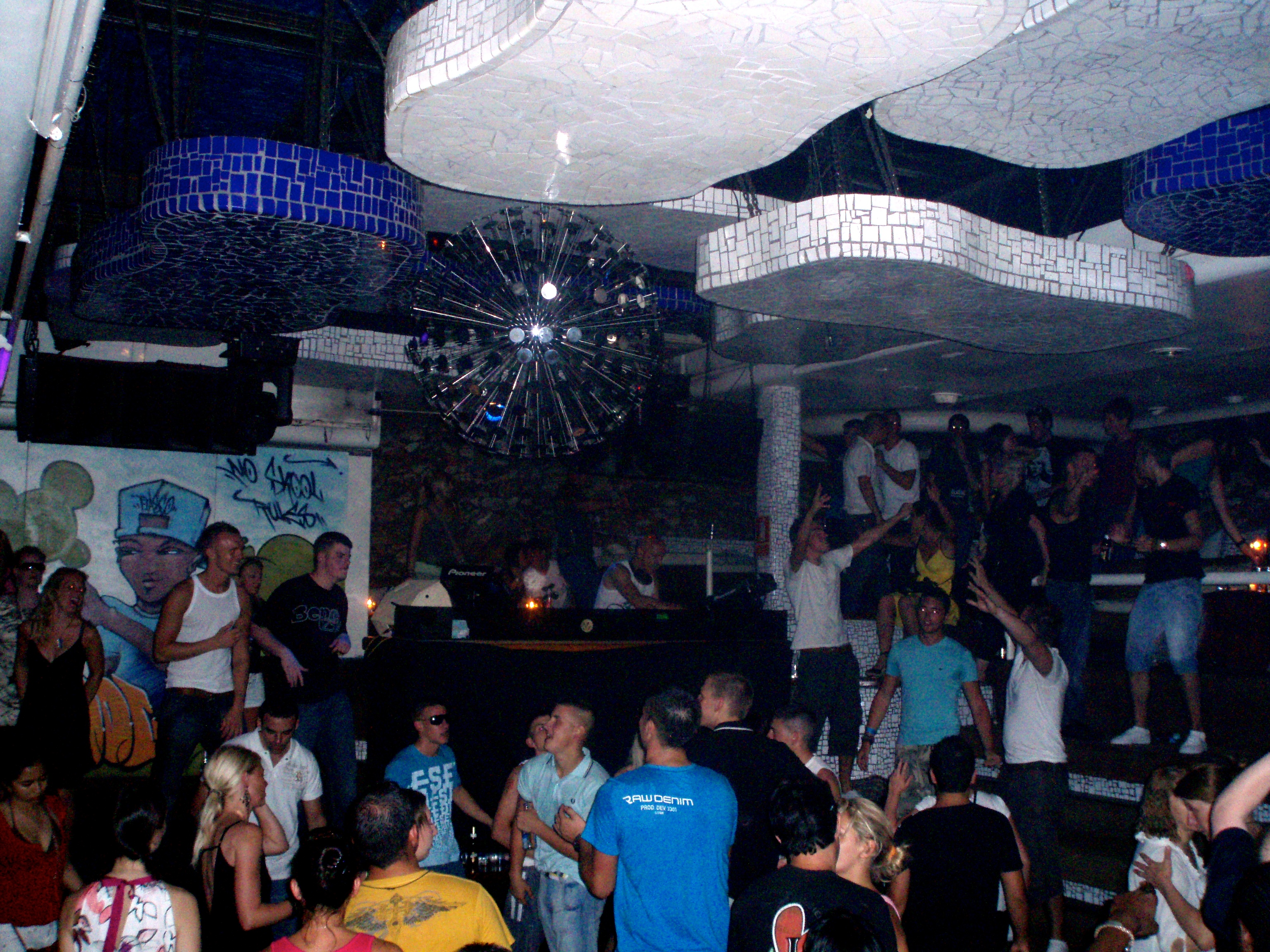
- People dancing to a club DJ's music
- Stylistic origins: Folk
- Cultural origins: Ancient, worldwide
- Derivative forms: Disco

Subgenres
- Electronic dance music

Soft and Furious - Lucidity
An example of dance music

Dance music is music composed specifically to facilitate or accompany dancing. It can be either a whole piece or part of a larger musical arrangement. In terms of performance, the major categories are live dance music and recorded dance music. While there exist attestations of the combination of dance and music in ancient history (for example Ancient Greek vases sometimes show dancers accompanied by musicians), the earliest Western dance music that we can still reproduce with a degree of certainty are old-fashioned dances. In the Baroque period, the major dance styles were noble court dances (see Baroque dance). In the classical music era, the minuet was frequently used as a third movement, although in this context it would not accompany any dancing. The waltz also arose later in the classical era. Both remained part of the romantic music period, which also saw the rise of various other nationalistic dance forms like the barcarolle, mazurka, ecossaise, ballade and polonaise.

Modern popular dance music initially emerged from late 19th century's Western ballroom and social dance music. During the early 20th century, ballroom dancing gained popularity among the working class who attended public dance halls. Dance music became enormously popular during the 1920s. In the 1930s, known as the Swing era, Swing music was the popular dance music in America. In the 1950s, rock and roll became the popular dance music. The late 1960s saw the rise of soul and R&B music. Dominican and Cuban New Yorkers created the popular salsa dance in the late 1960s which stemmed from the Latin music genre of salsa. The rise of disco in the early 1970s led to dance music becoming popular with the public. By the late 1970s, electronic dance music was developing. This music, made using electronics, is a style of popular music commonly played in nightclubs, radio stations, shows and raves. Many subgenres of electronic dance music have evolved.

== Origins ==
Dancing to rhythmic music has long been a cherished tradition in civilizations around the world, where dynamic movements synchronized with percussion instruments such as drums, bells, and rattles serve as integral expressions of cultural identity, social cohesion, and spiritual significance.

Folk dance music accompanies traditional dance and may be contrasted with historical/classical, and popular/commercial dance music. An example of folk dance music in the United States is the old-time music played at square dances and contra dances.

== Historical dance music ==
While there exist attestations of the combination of dance and music in ancient times (for example Ancient Greek vases sometimes show dancers accompanied by musicians), the earliest Western dance music that we can still reproduce with a degree of certainty are the surviving medieval dances such as carols and the Estampie. The earliest of these surviving dances are almost as old as Western staff-based music notation.

=== By period ===
The Renaissance dance music was written for instruments such as the lute, viol, tabor, pipe, and the sackbut.

In the Baroque period, the major dance styles were noble court dances (see Baroque dance). Examples of dances include the French courante, sarabande, minuet and gigue. Collections of dances were often collected together as dance suites.

In the classical music era, the minuet was frequently used as a third movement in four-movement non-vocal works such as sonatas, string quartets, and symphonies, although in this context it would not accompany any dancing. The waltz also arose later in the classical era, as the minuet evolved into the scherzo (literally, "joke"; a faster-paced minuet).

Both remained part of the romantic music period, which also saw the rise of various other nationalistic dance forms like the barcarolle, mazurka and polonaise. Also in the romantic music era, the growth and development of ballet extended the composition of dance music to a new height. Frequently, dance music was a part of opera.

== Popular dance music ==
Modern popular dance music initially emerged from late 19th century's Western ballroom and social dance music.

=== By genre ===
Dance music works often bear the name of the corresponding dance, e.g. waltzes, the tango, the bolero, the can-can, minuets, salsa, various kinds of jigs and the breakdown. Other dance forms include contradance, the merengue (Dominican Republic), and the cha-cha-cha. Often it is difficult to know whether the name of the music came first or the name of the dance.

Ballads are commonly chosen for slow-dance routines. However ballads have been commonly deemed the opposite of dance music in terms of their tempo. Originally, the ballad was a type of dance as well (hence the name "ballad", from the same root as "ballroom" and "ballet"). Ballads are still danced on the Faeroe Islands.

==== Dansband ====
"Dansband" ("Dance band") is a term in Swedish for bands who play a kind of popular music, "dansbandsmusik" ("Dance band music"), to partner dance to. These terms came into use around 1970, and before that, many of the bands were classified as "pop groups". This type of music is mostly popular in the Nordic countries.

==== Disco ====
Disco is a genre of dance music containing elements of funk, soul, pop, and salsa. It was most popular during the mid to late 1970s, though it has had brief resurgences afterwards. The first notable fully synthesized disco hit was "I Feel Love" by Donna Summer. Looping inspired the electronic dance music genre.

==== Electronic ====
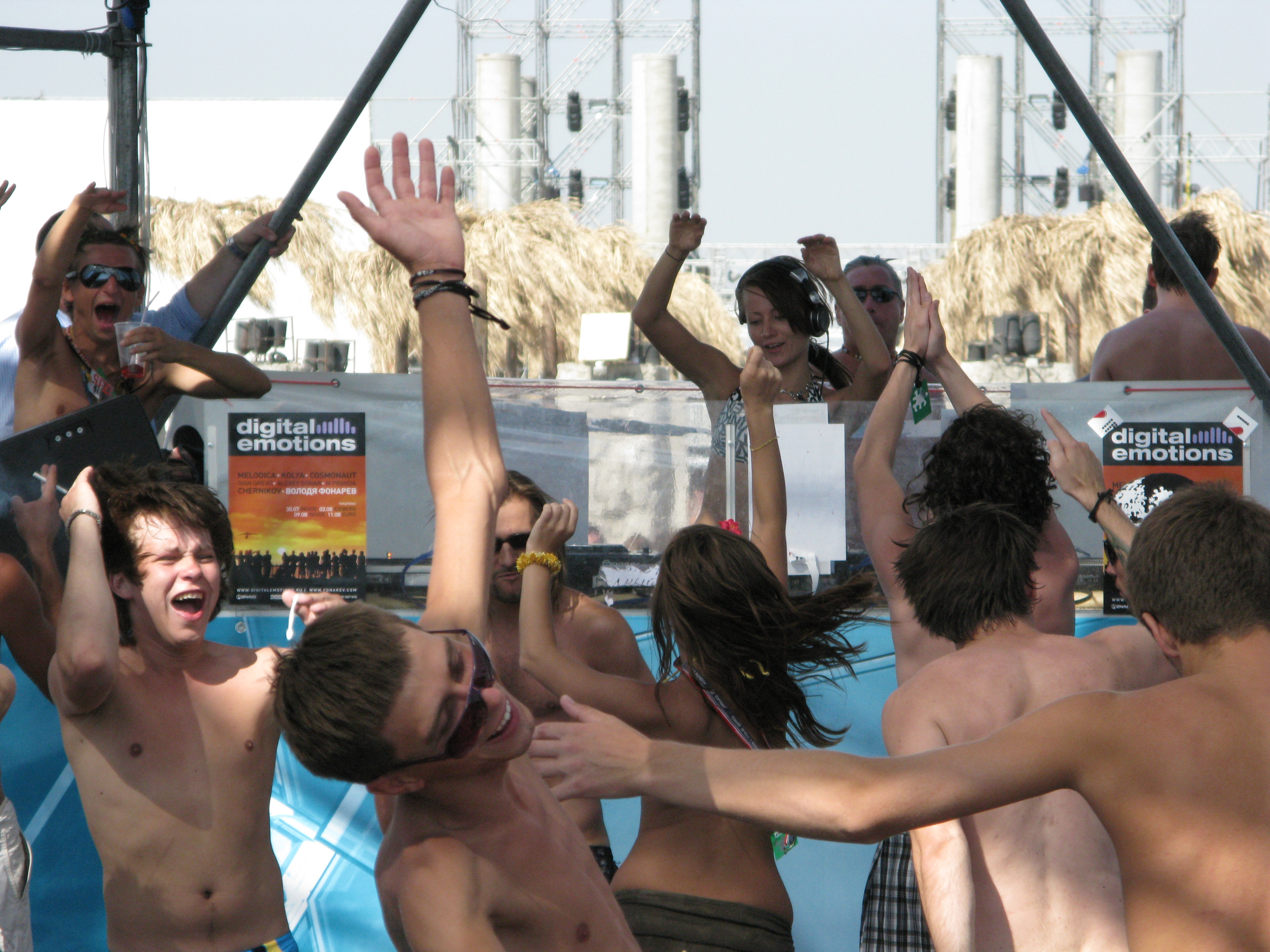
Dance party in Kazantip Festival, Crimea. Electronic dance music.

By 1981, a new form of dance music was developing. This music, made using electronics, is a style of popular music commonly played in dance music nightclubs, radio stations, shows and raves. During its gradual decline in the late 1970s, disco became influenced by electronic musical instruments such as synthesizers. sampling and segueing as found in disco continued to be used as creative techniques within trance music, techno music and especially house music.

Electronic dance music experienced a boom in the late 1980s. In the UK, this manifested itself in the dance element of Tony Wilson's Haçienda scene (in Manchester) and London clubs like Delirium, The Trip, and Shoom. The scene rapidly expanded to the Summer Of Love in Ibiza, which became the European capital of house and trance. In 2018, the release of Fisher's "Losing It", a significant tech-house crossover by the Australian EDM producer, marked a notable shift in trends within the dance music landscape.

Many music genres that made use of electronic instruments developed into contemporary styles mainly due to the MIDI protocol, which enabled computers, synthesizers, sound cards, samplers, and drum machines to interact with each other and achieve the full synchronization of sounds. Electronic dance music is typically composed using synthesizers and computers, and rarely has any physical instruments. Instead, this is replaced by analogue and digital electronic sounds, with a 4/4 beat. Many producers of this kind of music however, such as Darren Tate and MJ Cole, were trained in classical music before they moved into the electronic medium.

Associated with dance music are usually commercial tracks that may not easily be categorized, such as "The Power" by Snap!, "No Limit" by 2 Unlimited, "Gonna Make You Sweat (Everybody Dance Now)" by C+C Music Factory, and the Beatmasters' "Rok da House" but the term "dance music" is applied to many forms of electronic music, both commercial and non-commercial.

Some of the most popular upbeat genres include house, techno, gqom, drum & bass, jungle, hardcore, electronica, industrial, breakbeat, trance, psychedelic trance, UK garage and electro. There are also much slower styles, such as downtempo, chillout and nu jazz.

Many subgenres of electronic dance music have evolved. Subgenres of house include acid house, kwaito, electro house, hard house, funky house, deep house, afro house, tribal house, hip house, tech house and US garage. Subgenres of drum & bass include techstep, hardstep, jump-up, intelligent D&B/atmospheric D&B, liquid funk, sambass, drumfunk, neurofunk and ragga jungle. Subgenres of other styles include progressive breaks, booty bass, Goa trance, hard trance, hardstyle, minimal techno, gabber techno, breakcore, broken beat, trip hop, folktronica and glitch. Speed garage, breakstep, 2-step, bassline, grime, UK funky, future garage and the reggae-inspired dubstep are all subgenres of UK garage.

=== By decade ===
==== 1900s–1910s ====
During the early 20th century, ballroom dancing gained popularity among the working class who attended public dance halls.

==== 1920s ====
Dance music became enormously popular during the 1920s. Nightclubs were frequented by large numbers of people at which a form of jazz, which was characterized by fancy orchestras with strings instruments and complex arrangements, became the standard music at clubs. A particularly popular dance was the fox-trot. At the time this music was simply called jazz, although today people refer to it as "white jazz" or big band. Marabi evolved in South Africa in the 1920s, rooted in South African folk music, ragtime, jazz and blues. People were able to dance endlessly without having to have been familiar with the songs being played, before.

==== 1930s–1940s ====
Genres: Swing music, mbube, Congolese rumba, Western swing. Duke Ellington, Benny Goodman and Glenn Miller gained swing jazz hits.

==== 1950s ====
Genres: Rock and roll, kwela

In 1952, the television showed that American Bandstand switched to a format where teenagers dance along as records are played. American Bandstand continued to be shown until 1989. Since the late 1950s, disc jockeys (commonly known as DJs) played recorded music at nightclubs.

==== 1960s ====
Genres: Rock and roll, R&B, funk, mbaqanga

In 1960, Chubby Checker released his song "The Twist" setting off a dance craze. The late 1960s saw the rise of soul and R&B music which used lavish orchestral arrangements.

==== 1970s ====
Genres: Disco, funk, R&B, hip hop

In 1970, the television show Soul Train premiered featuring famous soul artists who would play or lipsync their hits while the audience danced along. In the early '70s, Kool and the Gang, Ohio Players, and B.T. Express were popular funk bands. By the mid-1970s, disco had become one of the main genres featured. In 1974, Billboard added a Disco Action chart of top hits to its other charts (see List of Billboard number one dance club songs). Donna Summer, the Bee Gees, the Village People and Gloria Gaynor gained pop hits. Disco was characterized by the use of real orchestral instruments, such as strings, which had largely been abandoned during the 1950s because of rock music. In contrast to the 1920s, however, the use of live orchestras in night clubs was extremely rare due to its expense. The disco craze reached its peak in the late 1970s when the word "disco" became synonymous with "dance music" and nightclubs were referred to as "discos".

==== 1980s ====
Genres: Funk, hip hop, new jack swing, R&B, bounce, Miami bass, boogie, disco, jaiva, contemporary R&B, new wave, dark wave, Italo disco, Euro disco, post-disco, synth-pop, dance-pop, dance-rock, house, kwaito, acid house, hip house, techno, freestyle, electro, hi-NRG, EBM, cosmic disco, Balearic beat, new beat

==== 1990s ====
Genres: New jack swing, contemporary R&B, dancehall, hip hop, G-funk, Miami bass, house, Italo dance, Italo house, Eurodance, Europop, hip house, electro, electroclash, progressive house, French house, techno, minimal techno, trance, alternative dance, drum and bass, jungle, big beat, breakbeat, breakbeat hardcore, rave, hardcore, happy hardcore, speed garage, UK garage, soca, reggaeton, trance, psytrance, Goa trance, Afro house

==== 2000s ====
Genres: Electropop, dance-pop, snap, crunk, dancehall, reggaeton, dance-punk, nu-disco, electro house, minimal techno, dubstep, grime, bassline, UK funky, contemporary R&B, hip hop, drum and bass, progressive house, hardstyle, funky house

==== 2010s ====
Genres: Electropop, synthpop, gqom, glitchpop, hip house, nu-disco, new wave, new rave, trance, house, hi-NRG, hard NRG, dance-pop, electro-industrial, deep house, drum and bass, dubstep, techstep, liquid funk, electro house, progressive house, breakbeat, hardstyle, dubstyle, drumstep, hip hop, ghetto house, Jersey club, trap, drill, moombahton, moombahcore, dancehall, tropical house, UK garage, Europop, hyperpop

== Radio formats ==
The Dance/Mix Show Airplay chart tracks the most popular tracks played by radio stations using a "dance music" format. Modern dance music is typically a core component of the rhythmic adult contemporary and rhythmic contemporary formats, and an occasional component of the contemporary hit radio format in the case of dance songs which chart.

Mixshows are radio programmes which feature a sequence of dance music tracks where each track's outro is mixed into the intro of the next.

== See also ==
- Dance competition music
- Computational musicology
- Dance party
- List of electronic music genres
- Electronic dance music
- Electronic body music
- Gospel music
- Rock music
- Soul music
