= Konflict =

Scottish musical duo

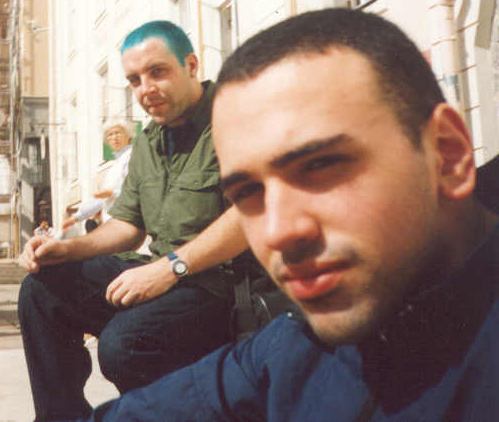
- Rodgers and Okan at Tallinn Town Hall Square, c. 2001

Background information
- Also known as: Kemal and Rob Data
- Origin: Glasgow, United Kingdom
- Genres: Drum and bass, neurofunk
- Years active: 1998–2000 as Konflict, 2000–2002 as Kemal and Rob Data
- Labels: Renegade Hardware, Negative, Cryptic Audio, Underfire, Audio Blueprint, Moving Shadow, Black Sun Empire Recordings, Deeper Realms, DSCI4, Cyanide, Nerve, Industry
- Members: Kemal Okan; Robert Rodgers

Konflict is a drum and bass duo consisting of Kemal Okan and Robert Rodgers.

== Description ==
Kemal Okan and Robert Rodgers, both from Glasgow, United Kingdom, had their origins in the Detroit techno scene, with their preferred sound being the minimal style of Techno. Kemal started to DJ at an early age and worked at the iconic 23rd Precinct record store in Glasgow. Their techno background can be heard as it had a strong influence in their music. In 1998, they released their first track under the alias Konflict. The track was a remix of a trance tune named Share of Bitterness by Paragliders. It was released on a Scottish label named WAQT Recordings.

Their first breakthrough occurred when they signed to Renegade Hardware in 1999. Their most notable releases on this label include Roadblock, The Beckoning, the Maelstrom EP and their hit, Messiah, which in 2010 was named the number one most essential Drum and Bass track of that decade by the influential Knowledge Magazine. After a struggle over the release of Messiah, when Kemal and Rob left Renegade Hardware in 2000, they abandoned the Konflict name as it was owned by and exclusively signed to the label. They continued to make music as Kemal and Rob Data and started their own label, Negative Recordings.

Rob Data gave up recording new music with Kemal in 2002 and Negative Recordings was discontinued afterwards, Kemal started his own Cryptic Audio label, through which he released music until 2004. On its first release, Kemal used the alias Paranoid User, which was the only known occasion when he released under a different pseudonym.

Besides releases on Renegade Hardware and their own labels, their music appeared on labels such as Outbreak, Moving Shadow, Underfire, Audio Blueprint, Timeless, DSCI4, Cyanide Recordings, and Industry Recordings. Kemal also co-operated with other artists such as Dom & Roland, Technical Itch, Paul Reset, Black Sun Empire, Sinthetix|Rob F and Impulse, and Dresden Codex.

In 2004, Kemal was quoted to be "fed up with the current state of the Drum and Bass scene" and returned to his studies. He continued to work on music production as he joined the arabesque world music formation Nomad'iqa and produced their first album. He also produced an album for Velahavle, a Bosnian Trip hop-Electronica band from Sarajevo that was released in 2005.

In 2024, Konflict reunited to perform at a drum and bass festival in Mexico. Kemal had also begun to record and release new solo music since around this time.

== Influence ==
Their music has been cited as being heavily influential in the development of the neurofunk subgenre, which can be recognised in releases later that decade. Artists such as Phace have stated that Konflict had a great influence on their sound, as Florian from Phace puts it; "I have to point out Optical and Konflict as my favourite producers of all the time. They practically paved the way for the sound we love and try to continue nowadays." The more widely known Pendulum, also named Kemal and Konflict as one of their biggest Drum & Bass influences in their early years.

== Trivia ==
The title of their track "Bios-Fear" together with Stakka & Skynet got its name because of the computer trouble they experienced while writing the tune (probably it was BIOS related). "Kemal and Rob came down from Glasgow to Brighton for a few days and we all went in the studio and out of it came 'Bios-Fear'. Named because at the time because our PC had a complete meltdown and Kemal and Rob spent hours trying to revive it."

It took Kemal only a few days to write the remix of Crisis, a breaks tune by Paul Reset; "I asked if he fancied taking on one of my breaks tunes. I met him for a coffee and gave him the parts to "Crisis" (originally released on NB004) and within a couple of days – he'd finished it, the man was a genius in the studio." It was the biggest release in the history of Nerve Recordings, but as the distributor went bankrupt, they were never able to determine how many were sold.

The track Stranded, a collaboration between Black Sun Empire and Kemal, was made after Kemal was literally stranded at Amsterdam Airport Schiphol, and then stayed with the three Dutch members in Utrecht for several days.

Kemal's last releases were The Anthem (Kemal Remix) in 2006 and Tamghra Nouchen (Kemal & Dresden Codex Remix) in 2011. These two tracks were composed years before, and were released years later after Kemal left the scene, due to delays and problems with label managements.

== Discography ==
=== Singles and EPs ===
- RoadBlock / State of Mind (1999)
- Bad Acid / Doorway (featuring Usual Suspects) (1999)
- Cyanide / Outpost (1999)
- Obsidian / Pendulum (2000)
- Beckoning (2000)
- Maelstrom / Celestial / New World Order / Beckoning (Usual Suspects Remix) (2000)
- Messiah / Kontempt (featuring Kemal & Paul Reset) (2000)
- Messiah VIP (2000)

=== Remixes ===
- Paragliders – Share of Bitterness (Konflict Remix) (1998)
- Karl K – Synapse (Konflict Remix) (1999)
- Tipple – Hope (Konflict Remix) (1999)
- UFO! – My Personal Blackmail (Konflict's Negative Remix) (2000)
- Usual Suspects – Killa Bees (Konflict Remix) (2000)
- State of Play – Poor Mans Deal (Konflict Mix) (2000)
- Tha Countamen & Alley Cat – Payload (Konflict Remix) (2000)
- Faith in Chaos – Possession (Konflict Remix) (2002)
- Bulletproof – The Nephilim (Konflict Remix) (2002)
- DeeJay Delta feat. Full Kontakt – Midnight Train (Kemal Remix) (2026)
