= Audio (musician) =

British DJ and producer

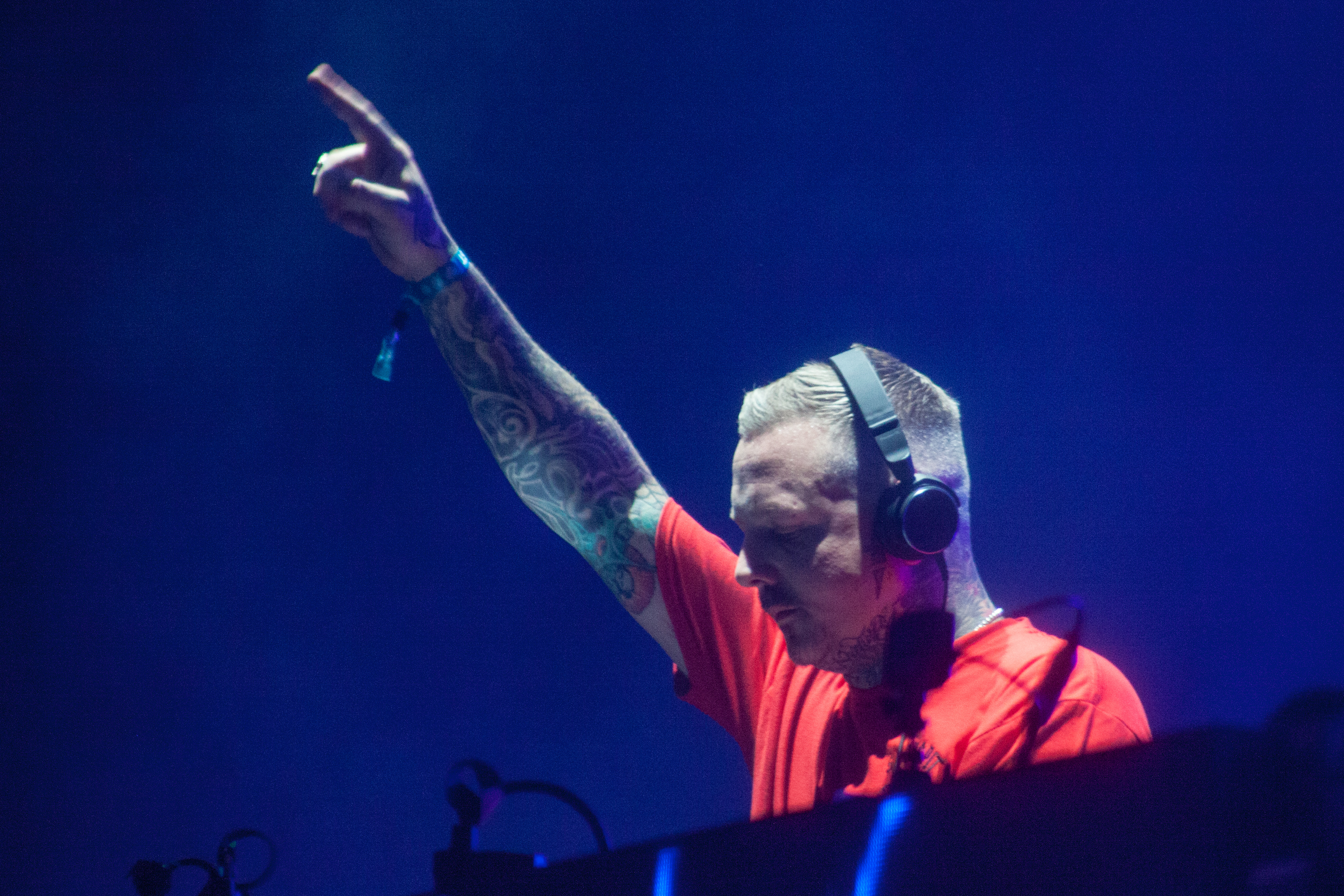
- Audio performing at festival Beats for Love in 2019 (Ostrava, Czech Republic)

Background information
- Birth name: Gareth Greenall
- Born: Redhill, Surrey, England
- Origin: Redhill, Surrey, England
- Genres: Drum and bass; breakbeat; neurofunk
- Occupation(s): Turntablist, record producer
- Years active: 1997–present
- Labels: RAM Records, Blackout Music, Virus Recordings, Snake Pit Records
- Website: www.ramrecords.com/artist/audio audiosnakepit.bandcamp.com/music

Gareth Greenall, better known by his stage name Audio, is a British DJ and producer from Redhill, England. Currently signed to RAM Records and his own label Snake Pit Records, he has released three albums on Virus Recordings. Greenall is also part of the record production group Pixel Fist.

== Biography ==
Attending the "Dance Kiss FM" events in London as a teenager, Audio became familiar with the jungle and drum and bass scene and soon booked his own party with DJs Ed Rush & Optical. He was hired as studio engineer at the UK hard house label Alphamagic and later became an A&R.

In 2014, Audio signed with RAM Records and had his first release shortly thereafter, "Heads Up" / "Stampede".

In 2019, Audio founded Snake Pit Records. Shortly after, he released the first single on the new label titled "Frog March".

Greenall and Ed Rush form the duo Killbox.

== Discography ==
=== Albums ===
Year	Release	Label
2008	To the Edge of Reason	Tech Freak Recordings
2010	Genesis Device	Virus Recordings
2012	Soul Magnet	Virus Recordings
2013	Force of Nature	Virus Recordings
2016	Beastmode	RAM Records
2021	[ unsocial ]	RAM Records
2024	Where the Chaos Lies	Blackout Music NL

=== Singles ===
Year	Release	Label
2007	"Missing"	Subtitles Music
2009	"Furyen"	Subtitles Music
2009	"Planet Fall / Pandorum"	Virus Recordings
2010	"Rage / Fear of Life" (w/ the Funktion)	RUN DNB
2010	"Collision"	Genesis Device
2010	"Sector 9 / Loudener"	Position Chrome
2011	"The Journey, Pt. 2"	Virus Recordings
2011	"Vacuum / Exit Wound"	RUN DNB
2012	"Fall Back / Rust"	Renegade Hardware
2012	"Timerider / Jarhead"	Bad Taste Recordings
2013	"Creator & Destroyer / Burn It Down"	Forbidden Society Recordings
2013	"Bag of Bones"	Blackout Music NL
2014	"Heads Up / Stampede"	RAM Records
2014	Nil by Mouth EP	RAM Records
2015	"Shatterdome / 2 Stroke"	RAM Records
2015	"Make It Happen / Napalm"	RAM Records
2016	"Now the Future / Drop It Human"	RAM Records
2016	"Beastmode Sampler"	RAM Records
2017	"Rat Race"	Blackout Music NL
2019	"Dungeon" (with Synergy)	Blackout Music NL
2019	"Mirage" (with IMANU)	Vision Recordings
2019	"Frog March"	Snake Pit Records
2019	"Darkseid"	Snake Pit Records
2019	"Dead Stock"	Snake Pit Records
2019	"Ultrasonic"	Snake Pit Records
2019	"Atomize / Glass House"	Snake Pit Records
2020	"Elements"	Snake Pit Records
2020	"Genesis Device (Remixes)"	Virus Recordings
2020	"Marauder"	Blackout Music NL
2020	"Confined"	Surveillance Music
