= Wormhole (album) =

Studio album by Ed Rush & Optical
- Released: 16 November 1998
- Recorded: 1997–1998
- Studio: Virus Studios, London
- Genre: Techstep, neurofunk, drum and bass
- Length: 144:15 (CD); 71:51 (LP)
- Label: Virus Recordings
- Producer: Ed Rush & Optical

Ed Rush & Optical chronology
Wormhole (1998)	The Creeps (Invisible And Deadly!) (2000)

Professional ratings
Review scores
Source	Rating
AllMusic	4/5 stars
Melody Maker	4/5 stars

Wormhole is the debut album by the English drum and bass act Ed Rush & Optical. Recorded between 1997 and 1998, the album was issued on 16 November 1998 through their self-run Virus Recordings label on vinyl and CD formats. The CD edition was a double disc, the second disc containing an hour-long continuous mix while the LP was a five-disc boxset, with a single track per side. On 26 November 2012 the album was reissued on both formats with new artwork, the LP edition being pressed on green vinyl.

Since the album's initial release in 1998, it has gained praise amongst critics, with some even considering it as one of the best drum and bass albums of all time. Wormhole is also considered to be the first neurofunk (a subgenre of drum and bass) album recorded.

The recordings were produced and mixed in Optical's custom built studio, based in Rob Playford's Moving Shadow offices, St Anne's Court, SOHO, London between 1997 and '98. The final mastering was done by Stuart Hawkes at Metropolis Studios in Chiswick, London.

Studio Equipment:

Mackie 32/8 32 channel, 2 x Emu E6400 Ultra (1x8 outs, 1x16 outs), Alesis Quadraverb, Focusrite Green Eq x2, Focusrite Green Compressor, Focusrite ISA430 Producer Pack, Lexicon Alex, Lexicon MPX1, Alesis MidiVerb4, TC Electronics Fireworx, TC Electronics Finalizer, Joe Meek VC1, Drawmer MX40, CryBaby Wah Pedal, Boss Pedals - (Too many to list but all the popular ones), Novation Basstation, OSCar, Sequential Circuits Pro1, Prophet 5, Wurlitzer, PPG Wave 2.1, Neumann TLM 103 mic, Fender Strat 1972, Oberheim/Viscount GM1000, Korg Z1, Kawai K1r, BSS DPR-402 Compressor, Unitor8 Midi output, Kenton Midi to CV box, Yamaha NS-10M monitors, Dynaudio BM15 monitors. Apple LCII computer. Cubase SX 1. All top quality, shielded, balanced, gold core, custom made wiring throughout, with a fully balanced +10db signal path.

In 2016, Optical left a YouTube comment stating, "Half the drums were my original recordings of drummers I know...other half were taken from 70's funk tunes and resampled many times to get them to sound unique and solid...none of them were sped up as I always cut my drums into individual hits, reprogram them in my sequencer and use them at original pitch to keep their chunky sound intact."

== Track listing ==
CD 1
No.	Title	Artist(s)	Length
1.	"Mystery Machine"	Ed Rush & Optical	7:25
2.	"Splinter"	Fortran (Ed Rush, Optical & Fierce)	7:11
3.	"Slip Thru"	Optical	6:47
4.	"Millenium"	Optical	6:13
5.	"Glass Eye"	Ed Rush & Optical	8:01
6.	"Compound"	Ed Rush & Optical	8:07
7.	"Fixation"	Ed Rush & Optical	7:56
8.	"Point Blank"	Ed Rush & Optical	7:07
9.	"Dozer"	Ed Rush & Optical	6:14
10.	"Wormhole"	Ed Rush & Optical	6:14
11.	"Lithosphere"	Ed Rush & Optical	1:40
Total length:			Disc 1 73:30

CD 2
No.	Title	Artist(s)	Length
1.	"Point Blank"	Ed Rush & Optical	4:57
2.	"Millenium"	Optical	4:35
3.	"Splinter"	Fortran (Ed Rush, Optical & Fierce)	4:46
4.	"Fixation"	Ed Rush & Optical	5:19
5.	"Void"	Optical	4:24
6.	"Dozer"	Ed Rush & Optical	4:16
7.	"Slip Thru"	Optical	4:33
8.	"Wormhole"	Ed Rush & Optical	4:11
9.	"Medicine (Matrix remix)"	Ed Rush & Optical	3:35
10.	"Compound"	Ed Rush & Optical	3:08
11.	"Lifespan"	Ed Rush & Optical	6:00
12.	"Mystery Machine"	Ed Rush & Optical	5:10
13.	"Grow Bag"	Ed Rush & Optical	4:26
14.	"Glass Eye"	Ed Rush & Optical	4:23
15.	"Crisis"	Ed Rush & Optical	5:37
16.	"Lithosphere"	Ed Rush & Optical	1:21
Total length:			Disc 2 70:50; Total 144:15

LP Edition
No.	Title	Artist(s)	Length
1.	"Mystery Machine"	Ed Rush & Optical	7:25
2.	"Splinter"	Fortran (Ed Rush, Optical & Fierce)	7:11
3.	"Slip Thru"	Optical	6:47
4.	"Millenium"	Optical	6:13
5.	"Glass Eye"	Ed Rush & Optical	8:01
6.	"Point Blank"	Ed Rush & Optical	7:07
7.	"Compound"	Ed Rush & Optical	8:06
8.	"Fixation"	Ed Rush & Optical	7:56
9.	"Wormhole"	Ed Rush & Optical	6:49
10.	"Dozer"	Ed Rush & Optical	6:15
Total length:			71:51
