= Optical (musician) =

British musician

- Born: Matthew Quinn; London, England
- Other names: Teknarchi, Morpheus, Matt Quinn, Arteq, Fly By Wire, Little Matt, Area 39
- Occupations: Musician, DJ, producer, record label owner
- Years active: 1992–present
- Musical career
- Genres: Electronic; jungle; drum and bass; breakbeat hardcore; techstep; neurofunk
- Instruments: Sampler, turntable, drum machine, synthesizer
- Labels: Moving Shadow; Metalheadz; Prototype; Virus Recordings; V Recordings; 31 Records; Metro Recordings

Matt Quinn, known by his stage name Optical, is a British musician, producer and DJ. He is co-founder and owner of Virus Recordings, a widely regarded drum and bass record label. He is best known as one half of drum and bass duo Ed Rush and Optical (with his long-time musical partner Ed Rush), whose debut album Wormhole has been described as pivotal in the development of the neurofunk subgenre. He is also the brother of Jamie Quinn also known as Matrix.

== Early years ==
Quinn started making music as a teenager, and performing as a DJ on the UK free festival scene with Bedlam, Spiral Tribe and Techno Travellers Soundsystem including the legendary Castlemorton Common Festival. He had his first releases in 1992 using the name Little Matt, released on Fat Chuna Recordings, and also under his short-lived hardcore jungle alias Teknarchi in 1993, and later as a techno producer (under various monikers such as Fly By Wire featured on Carl Cox's F.A.C.T 2 release, and Morpheus). He worked as a sound engineer and producer from 1992 onwards, (including production credits for the 1994 Jungle anthem "Leviticus - Burial") for several London music studios including Great Asset Studios (Gray's Inn Road, Clerkenwell, London), Pirate Club Studios (Roller Express, Lea Valley), Fokus Records Studios (London) and JAL/Stage1 Studios (London). His breakthrough successes as Optical include "To Shape The Future" 12" published 1997 on Metalheadz, "Grey Odyssey" featured on Grooverider's successful mix album "The Prototype Years", also "Moving 808's" and in collaboration with Ed Rush and Fierce on "Cutslo/Alien Girl" both on Prototype Recordings.

Along with his drum and bass musician and DJ career he has worked on many remixes and collaborated as a composer, producer, programmer and sound engineer for other notable artists including Rob Playford's label Moving Shadow for which he was credited on Goldie's "Saturnz Return" and Grooverider on whose 1998 MOBO Award-winning album "Mysteries of Funk" he was credited as writer and producer.

He went on to receive the accolade of 'Best Producer' at the 1998 Muzik Magazine Dance Music Awards in London.

== Ed Rush & Optical ==
In 1995 he first met his main future musical collaborator, another upcoming drum and bass artist Ed Rush with whom he would form a musical partnership. Shortly after, Rob Playford gave Optical a small space in his Soho office building to use as his studio, and in this studio the duo recorded and released the first of several 12" singles both as Ed Rush & Optical and in collaborations with other artists. Having recorded a dozen or so joint recordings in that studio, the duo considered that a lot of their material produced at the time was not fitting the style for labels like Metalheadz, Prototype and other labels they were associated with but that they still wanted to release it, as the music had been played by the two in clubs with a great reaction from those attending. So they decided to start their own imprint Virus Recordings in 1998.

The first single release was in early 1998, "The Medicine/ Punchbag" and the first full LP release by the duo on the label was their renowned long-play "Wormhole", released the same year, the album that is generally considered one of the defining points in the evolution of the drum and bass genre. The album is recognized as the recording that introduced the sub-genre of drum and bass known today as neurofunk and Optical, as the more technical musician in the duo, is considered by the wider music production community to be one of the genre's original sonic architects.

In 2000, DJ Craze used their track "Watermelon" in his beat-juggling routine which helped him win his 3rd DMC World Championship. They released their second album in 2000, The Creeps (Invisible And Deadly!) which broadened their palette by introducing vocals to the mix and won best album and best producers at the Knowledge DnB awards. Their third album, The Original Doctor Shade was released in 2003 and featured a collaboration with turntablist DJs, Scratch Perverts. In 2005 they took part in the 40 Artists, 40 Days project organised by the Tate Gallery in the run up to London's successful bid to win the right to host the 2012 Olympics and Paralympics. 2006 saw the release of their fourth album Chameleon which saw them using a live band for the first time and three years later followed with Travel the Galaxy. Their track Frontline was use in the soundtrack to the 2008 video game Wipeout HD. In 2014, Ministry of Sound described them as one of the most influential artists in drum and bass. Their most recent album No Cure was released in October 2015.

2015 also saw the release of their first headline mix on the long running Fabriclive series of mix CDs, FabricLive.82. They had a long relationship with the London club Fabric having played at the opening weekend in 1999 and appearing on the first drum and bass mix released by Fabric in 2002 (FabricLive.06 mixed by Grooverider). Following Islington Council's decision to revoke Fabric's licence in September 2016, Ed Rush & Optical took part in a benefit show to challenge the decision. In November 2016 agreement was made to reopen the club. As well as numerous club appearances they have performed at many well known festivals including Boomtown (2018/2022/2025) EDC (2011/13/14/15/17), Dour Festival (2006/2015), Nocturnal Wonderland (2001,2011/2019), Glastonbury (1999 and 2014) Bestival in 2013,

== Virus recordings ==
Although the Virus imprint was initially intended for self-publishing the duo's own Ed Rush & Optical material (a practice that is common in indie and dance music), Virus' subsequent releases have featured many notable drum and bass artists like Fierce, Matrix, Cause 4 Concern, Noisia, Bad Company, Pendulum, Ram Trilogy (Andy C, Shimon, Ant Miles), Audio, Mefjus, The Upbeats, Optiv & BTK, Insideinfo and many others.

== Discography ==
=== Early works ===
==== Singles/EPs ====
- "Little Matt & Uprock - Techno Travellers EP" Fat Chuna (1992)
- "Little Matt & Dark Deas - Give It In" Fat Chuna (1993)
- "Durban Poison - Babylon Timewarp (Little Matt's Remix)" Subliminal Records (1993)
- "Flashback / You Cannot - Teknarchi" Fokus Recordings (1993)
- "Morpheus - Aftermath EP" Blame Technology (1994)
- "Morpheus - Transistor EP" Blame Technology (1994)
- "Just Another Artist - Rhythm / Lust" Just Another Label (1994)
- "Just Another Artist - Good Love / Full Circle" Just Another Label (1994)
- "Morpheus vs The Warlock - Disconnected EP" Blame Technology (1995)
- "Flute FX / Attitude - Area 39" Bear Necessities (1994)
- "Hed F.U.K - Tranquillity / It's A Dope Thing" Bear Necessities (1995)
- "Mental Patient / Twisted Brain - Area 39" Bear Necessities (1995)
- "Morpheus - Spikey Trance EP" Blame Technology (1995)
- "Tuneful / You Cannot - Nut-E-1 & Teknarchi" Bear Necessities (1995)
- "Dreaming / Whatever - Area 39" Too'z Up Records (1995)
- "Sparkling - Little Matt" React (1995)
- "The Planet Spins - Area 39" Bear Necessities (1995)
- "Phat & Phuturistic - Little Matt" Jumpin n Pumpin Records (1995)
- "Silver Haze - Little Matt" Virgin (1995)
- "Cap Columbie - Arteq" Jumpin' & Pumpin' (1996)
- "Fly By Wire - Terminus" Blame Technology (1996)
- "Photofit - Flying Squad / Burning Waterfall" Narcotix Inc (1996)
- "Schar's World - Fly By Wire" Carl Cox F.A.C.T 2 (Worldwide Ultimatum 1997)

=== As Optical ===
==== Albums ====
- "20 Years of Optical Pt1" Virus Recordings (2016)
- "20 Years of Optical Pt2" Virus Recordings (2016)

==== Singles/EPs ====
- "No Time / T.H.X." Celluloid Records (1996)
- "Cut Throat Flow / Lazy Gun" Bear Necessities (1996)
- "Sleepless" React (1996)
- "Cryogenisis" React (1997)
- "The Shining / Dark Skies" Metro Recordings (1997)
- "Grey Odyssey" Prototype (1997)
- "Swift Glide" Metalheadz (1997)
- "To Shape The Future / Raging Calm" Metalheadz (1997)
- "Dom & Optical - Quadrant Six / Concrete Shoes" Moving Shadow (1997)
- "Dom & Optical - Quadrant Six Remix/ Rage Roll" Moving Shadow (1997)
- "Moving 808's / High Tek Dreams" Prototype Recordings (1997)
- "Bounce / The End Pt1" 31 Records (1997)
- "Search / The End Pt2" - Fortran (Ed Rush, Optical, Fierce) 31 Records (1998)
- "Ed Rush, Optical & Fierce - Cutslo (Lokuste Mix) / Alien Girl" Prototype Recordings (1998)
- "Edtrafiencial" No U-Turn (2009)
- "Optical Vs Matrix - Data Life / Crossfire" Ad Hoc Recordings (1998)
- "Optical & Ryme Tyme / Bad Company" Virus Recordings (1999)
- "Rock Baby / Driver - Jagged Edge" (Optical & Rymetyme) V Recordings (2000)
- "Electric Music / Kung-Fu" Virus Recordings (2008)
- "Infection / Optical & BTK" Dutty Audio (2016)

==== Optical remixes ====
- God is God - Laibach (Mute 1996)
- Start - NOHA (Noise 1 1997)
- Test Anxiety - Toenut (Mute 1997)
- Lethal But Steady - Bliss 'n' Tumble (Additive 1997)
- To Shape The Future Remix (Metalheadz 1997)
- Chemical #1 - Jesus Jones (Food 1997)
- Still - Boymerang - Dom & Optical VIP (Prototype Recordings 1997)
- Weapon VIP - Optical & Fierce (Virus 1997)
- System - Nemesis - Optical & Fierce Remix (Renegade Hardware 1998)
- Temper Temper - Goldie (FFRR 1998)
- Dub Me Crazy - Boom Boom Satellites (R&S Records 1998)
- Bye Bye Lover - The Chemical Pilot (Eruption Records 1998)
- Blue Monday - Orgy (F-111 Records 1998)
- Rainbows of Colour - Grooverider (Higher Ground/Sony 1998)
- Simple Man - Josh Wink (Ovum/Columbia 1998)
- Moving Thru Air - Jonny L (XL Recordings 1998)
- Secretly - Skunk Anansie (Virgin 1999)
- We Enter - Rymetyme (No-U-Turn 1999)
- Killa Bees - Usual Suspects - Optical & Fierce Remix (Renegade Hardware 1999)
- The Only Ryme That Bites - Mc Tunes vs 808 State (ZTT 1999)
- Blanket - Urban Species ft Imogen Heap (Beechwood Music 1999)
- Directrix - Divine Styler (Mo Wax 2000)
- Sonar - Optical & Trace Remix (Prototype Recordings 2000)
- Love Dump - Static X (F-111 Records 2000)
- Chemical - Sugizo - Fabio & Optical Remix (Invader Recordings 2000)
- Quadrant 6 - Dom & Optical VIP (Moving Shadow 1999)
- To Shape The Future Amen VIP (1999)
- Solarize - J Majik (Infrared 2001)
- Spaced Invader - Hatiras (Breakbeat Science Records 2002)
- Smarty Pants - Ed Rush & Optical - Goldtrix & Optical Remix (Virus Recordings 2003)

==== Production credits ====
- Burial - Leviticus (Philly Blunt Records 1994)
- Baby Gone Bizzerk EP - Bam Bam (Kickin' Records 1995)
- Piper - Jonny L - Grooverider Remix (XL Recordings 1997)
- Mysteries of Funk - Grooverider (Higher Ground/Prototype Recordings 1998)
- Saturn's Return - Goldie (FFRR 1998)
- Magnetic - Jonny L (XL Recordings 1998)
- El Oslo - Soul Coughing (Warner Bros Records 1998)
- Sleepwalk (Temperament) - Matrix (Virus Recordings 1999)
- Share The Fall (Grooveriders Jeep Style Mix) - Roni Size/Reprazent (Talkin' Loud 1997)
- Dirty Harry (Grooverider Remix) - Adam F (F-Jams 1997)
- Bachelorette (Grooverider Remix) - Bjork (One Little Indian 1997)
- Charade (Grooverider Remix) - Rachid (Deep Jungle 1998)
- Deep End (Grooverider's Deep Mix) - Sirenes (Columbia 1997)
- Rockit (Grooverider Remix) - Herbie Hancock (S3 1997)
- James Bond Theme (Grooverider's Jeep Remix) - Moby (Mute 1997)
- Temper Temper (Grooverider Remix) - Goldie (Polygram 1997)
- Pacific State (Grooverider Jeep Mix) - 808 State (ZTT 1998)
- Believe (Grooverider Remix) - Goldie (FFRR 1998)
- B-Boy Stance (Grooverider Remix) - Freestylers (Freskanova 1998)
- Pack Jam (Grooverider Remix) - The Jonzun Crew (Tommy Boy 1998)
- L-Train (Grooverider Remix) - Shootyz Groove (Reprise Records 1998)
- Fools Gold (Grooverider Remix) - Stone Rose's (Virgin 1998)
- Blame (Grooverider Jeep Dub) - Everything But The Girl (Virgin 1999)
- Rolling (Grooverider Remix) - Soul Coughing (Higher Education 1999)
- On The Double - Cypress Hill ft Grooverider (Higher Ground 1999)
- Codename John - The Crow (New Identity Records 2000)
- Codename John - Be With You (Prototype Recordings 2000)

=== As Ed Rush & Optical ===
==== Albums ====
- Wormhole Virus Recordings (1998)
- The Creeps (Invisible And Deadly!) Virus Recordings (2000)
- The Original Doctor Shade Virus Recordings (2003)
- Virus Vaults Virus Recordings (2005)
- Chameleon Virus Recordings (2006)
- Travel the Galaxy Virus Recordings (2009)
- No Cure Virus Recordings (2015)

==== Singles ====
- Funktion / Naked Lunch V Recordings (1997)
- Lifespan / Crisis Virus Recordings (1998)
- Medicine / Life Crisis Virus Recordings (1998)
- The Medicine / Punchbag Virus Recordings (1998)
- Wormhole Album Sampler Virus Recordings (1998)
- Zardoz / Satellites Virus Recordings (1998)
- Bacteria / Gasmask Virus Recordings (1999)
- Watermelon / Sick Note Virus Recordings (1999)
- Socom EP Virus Recordings (2000)
- KerbKrawler / Capsule Virus Recordings (2001)
- Pod Virus Recordings in (2001)
- Pacman (Ram Trilogy Remix) / Vessel Virus Recordings (2002)
- Innocence / Rehab Quarantine Recordings (2002)
- Remixes Vol. 1 Virus Recordings (2004) (UK #77)
- The Remixes Vol. 2 Virus Recordings (2004)
- Reece / Sick Note (Illskills Remix) Virus Recordings (2005)
- Reece / Taxi Driver Virus Recordings (2005)
- Crack Ball / Ride The Beast RUN DNB (2010)
- Brain Bucket / Falling Through Vision Recordings (2010)

==== DJ mixes ====
  - Radio 1 Essential Mix (1999)
  - Out of the Box (2004)
  - Virus Vaults (2005)
  - FabricLive.82 Fabric (2015)

==== Ed Rush & Optical remixes ====
- Watching Windows - Roni Size / Represent (Talkin' Loud 1997)
- Mindscan - Ram Trilogy (Ram Records 1999)
- Funktion Remix (Planet V/Ultra 1999)
- The Shining - Optical - Ed Rush & Optical Remix (Metro 1999)
- Bluesy Baby - Ram Jam World (WEA Japan 1999)
- Spaced Invader - Hatiras (Canvas 2001)
- We Want Your Soul - Adam Freeland (Maximise Profit 2003)
- Deadline - Digital (31 Records 2003)
- The Message - Cymande - Bootleg (2003)
- Beastman - Ram Trilogy (Ram Records 2004)
- Lyric On My Lip - Tali (Full Cycle Records 2004)
- You Got The Love - Candi Statton (2006)
- High Top - Sigma (Viper Recordings 2009)
- Split The Atom - Noisia (Division 2010)
- Serious - Manufactured Superstars (Magik Muzik 2011)
- Evolution - Ram Trilogy (Ram Records 2013)
