= Xtra Bass =

Annual drum and bass tour of the UK

- Genre: Drum and bass, Jungle
- Dates: 5–11 March (7 days)
- Locations: England, Scotland, Wales
- Years active: 2002 - present
- Website: website

Xtra Bass is a free week-long drum and bass tour of the UK hosted by the BBC's digital radio station BBC Radio 1Xtra. 2007 was the fifth year of the tour and features appearances by well-established drum and bass DJs such as DJ Bailey, L Double, Fabio & Grooverider and Crissy Criss among others.

The tour covers 7 cities in 7 days, and the itinerary for 2007 is as follows:

- 5 Mar 2007 Oxford, England
- 6 Mar 2007 Bristol, England
- 7 Mar 2007 Birmingham, England
- 8 Mar 2007 Sheffield, England
- 9 Mar 2007 Glasgow, Scotland
- 9 Mar 2007 London, England
- 10 Mar 2007 Swansea, Wales
- 11 Mar 2007 London, England

== See also ==
- List of electronic music festivals
- Live electronic music
