= Cereal Killaz =

American record producer

- Also known as: zarbizarre
- Origin: Orlando, Florida, United States
- Genres: Breakbeat, electronica, nu skool breaks
- Years active: 2005–present
- Labels: Scrape Recordings, Mechanoise Records, BreaksFM, Trans:verse Records, INgrooves
- Members: Alan Linhart
- Past members: K. Crooks

Cereal Killaz is an American record producer and DJ outfit, now consisting solely of Alan Linhart (a.k.a. zarbizarre - born August 6, 1975, in Philadelphia, Pennsylvania) and raised in Bowie, Maryland, United States. The music style of the act is classified as breakbeat and nu skool breaks, and has many other influences including nu metal, Florida breaks, drum and bass, industrial and indie rock. The Cereal Killaz have been listed by Annie Nightingale of BBC Radio 1 as one of the movers and shakers in the breakbeat scene.

== Biography ==
The Cereal Killaz began in Orlando, Florida, in 2005 as a collaboration between Alan Linhart (also known as zarbizarre) and K. Crooks (also known as Kostek). Their first release was a 12" vinyl dual single titled "Reality/Sheshone".

The duo released singles on Mechanoise Records, Trans:verse records, BreaksFM Records, Krispy Beatz Recordings and Inzpired Recordings.

The Cereal Killaz is one of but a few US acts to have performed at the Breakspoll International Breakbeat Awards, with their set from the performance airing on Annie Nightingale's BBC Radio1 radio show., and music by the Cereal Killaz has gone into a regular rotation in her shows. In addition, Cereal Killaz also had a guest mix on Jay Cunning's Kiss 100 London radio show, playing a mixed set of original material and remixes.

In addition to original material, Cereal Killaz has produced remixes for dance artists including Mephisto Odyssey, Rektchordz, Stormtrooperz, Metachemical, and Likwid Inzpiration

In 2007, zarbizarre & Kostek parted ways, and zarbizarre continued carrying on the name with original productions and remixes after returning to the Washington, D.C., area, releasing new singles on Scrape Recordings.

Cereal Killaz as a DJ act performs a mixing style called harmonic mixing, which is a style of DJing that matches the key of a song as well as the beats to create more interesting musical blends and mixes.

== Discography ==
=== Compilation album appearances ===
- Miami Aftermath WMC 2008 (March 2008, INgrooves)

=== Singles ===
- "Reality"
- "Sheshone"
- "Besieged"
- "Substance D"
- "Dopamarine"
- "No Mercy"
- "Progress Beta"

=== Remixes ===
- "Metachemical - Network Psychology (Cereal Killaz Remix)"
- "Likwid Inzpiration - You Were (Cereal Killaz Remix)"
- "Mephisto Odyssey - Watch You Go (Cereal Killaz Remix)"
- "Rektchordz - Lojack (Cereal Killaz Remix)"
- "Stormtrooperz - Devil May Cry (Cereal Killaz Remix)"
- "Stormtrooperz - Spirits (Cereal Killaz Remix)"
