= Grooverider Presents: The Prototype Years =

Compilation album by DJ Grooverider
- Released: 1997
- Genre: Drum and bass
- Label: Prototype Recordings

Professional ratings
Review scores
Source	Rating
AllMusic	4.5/5 stars

Grooverider Presents: The Prototype Years is a drum and bass compilation album by DJ Grooverider. It was released in 1997 on his label, Prototype Recordings.

A second CD containing a DJ mix of every track on the first CD, including four other tracks released on Prototype Recordings, was included with the CD version of the album. "Subway" by Ed Rush appears on the compilation vinyl disc, but not on the compilation CD, for unknown reasons. "Subway" is later included in the DJ mix CD.

== Track listing ==
First CD / Vinyl 1:

1. Codename John - Dreams of Heaven
2. John B - Secrets
3. Optical - Grey Odyssey
4. Matrix - Mute
5. Codename John - Deep inside
6. Dillinja - Silver Blade
7. Ed Rush & Fierce - Locust
8. Codename John - Warned
9. Boymerang - Still
10. Lemon D - City Lights

Mix CD / Vinyl:

1. Optical - Grey Odyssey
2. Ed Rush - Subway
3. Matrix - Mute
4. Lemon D - Going Gets Tuff (also known as "Going Gets Tough")
5. John B - Secrets
6. Dillinja - Silver Blade
7. Codename John - Dreams of Heaven
8. Boymerang - Still
9. Cybotron feat. Dillinja - Threshold
10. Codename John - Deep Inside
11. Ed Rush & Fierce - Locust
12. Lemon D - City Lights
13. Codename John - Warned
14. Boymerang, Dom & Roland, Optical - Still VIP Mix
