= FabricLive.06 =

Compilation album by Grooverider
- Released: October 22, 2002
- Genre: Electronic music
- Length: 20:00:00
- Label: Fabric
- Producer: Grooverider

Grooverider chronology
Mysteries of Funk (1998)	FabricLive.06 (2002)	The Harder They Come (2002)

FabricLive chronology
FabricLive.05 (2002)	FabricLive.06 (2002)	FabricLive.07 (2002)

Professional ratings
Review scores
Source	Rating
Resident Advisor	3.5/5 stars

FabricLive.06 is a DJ mix compilation album by Grooverider, as part of the FabricLive Mix Series.

== Track listing ==
No.	Title	Length
1.	"You Got Me Burning" (featuring Peshay)	5:59
2.	"Alien Girl" (featuring Fierce, Optical, Ed Rush)	4:45
3.	"The Mexican" (featuring Danny C)	4:34
4.	"Rebirth" (featuring Mampi Swift)	4:35
5.	"What I Need" (featuring Special Forces)	4:14
6.	"Hotspot" (featuring Total Science)	2:28
7.	"Bitch Muzzle" (featuring Twisted Individual)	3:35
8.	"Subway" (featuring Ed Rush)	3:09
9.	"Truly One" (featuring Origin Unknown)	4:41
10.	"The Lighter" (featuring DJ SS)	1:48
11.	"The Pulse" (featuring Bad Company)	4:20
12.	"Amen Slag" (featuring Optimus Prime)	4:41
13.	"Deadline" (featuring Digital)	3:36
14.	"It Ain't Too Loud" (featuring Dillinja)	2:31
15.	"Back for More" (featuring Influx Datum)	4:53
16.	"Milky Way" (featuring Ram Trilogy)	3:48
17.	"Kloakin' King" (featuring Krust)	4:42
18.	"Wasteground" (featuring Calyx)	2:01
