= All Crews =

UK Dance Music Book

All Crews: Journeys Through Jungle / Drum & Bass Culture
- Author: Brian Belle-Fortune
- Language: English
- Subject: Jungle; Drum and bass
- Genre: Non-fiction
- Publication date: 1999
- Publication place: United States
- ISBN: 9780954889708

All Crews: Journeys Through Jungle / Drum & Bass Culture is a non-fiction book written by author, DJ and journalist Brian Belle-Fortune. Described by music journalist Bill Brewster as a 'Jungle History', the book chronicles the development of the jungle and drum and bass style of UK dance music, and its emergence from earlier breakbeat hardcore and acid house styles.

All Crews explores the origins of jungle and drum and bass sound through a selection of non-fiction articles, creative writing pieces and interviews with key jungle and drum and bass artists. Belle-Fortune also examines and interviews the pirate radio stations, labels, crews, promoters and ravers that the scene grew from and revolved around.

== Background ==
Before writing All Crews, author, journalist and DJ Belle-Fortune conceived and co-produced BBC Radio 1Xtra's 'One in the Jungle' and worked on television projects relating to Jungle and Underground Youth Culture for BBC South, Channel 4 and MTV.

In 2021 Belle-Fortune appeared on The Guardian's panel discussion 'Black and British: 30 years of jungle and drum’n’bass'. The discussion was featured on Black History Month's official website and has now been archived in the online Black Music Library.

Belle-Fortune has been interviewed about the impact of All Crews multiple times by various media outlets and magazines, including Bulgarian magazine Avtora.com. He has also appeared on Richard Pup's podcast about his experience as a writer living with M.S.

== Legacy ==
=== Critical reception ===
The book was positively received by the music press, both when it was originally released and when it was re-released in 2004. It regularly features in shortlists of important books about the history of bass music, including those compiled by Mixmag, Attack Magazine, Identification of Music, and online music blogs like readsnriddims.com.

When talking to UKF music journalist Ben Murphy described All Crews as an 'excellent' guide to Drum and Bass. Beatportal also referenced All Crews as source material in an online feature about the 'definitive history of Drum and Bass'. Nottingham arts and culture magazine Leftlion, reviewed the 2005 edition and labelled it a 'classic'. In 2013 Romanian music magazine Awkmo published a feature about the prevalence of bootlegged copies in the Romanian Drum and Bass scene in Timișoara.

In 2020, Reverb quoted interviews from All Crews in a feature about the use of samplers in the development of Jungle Drum and Bass from Breakbeat Hardcore

All Crews has also been referenced in multiple other books about DJing, club culture and Jungle Drum and Bass. In Bill Brewster and Frank Broughton's title Last Night a DJ Saved My Life All Crews is quoted extensively in the chapter about Jungle.

Martin James also references All Crews multiple times in his title State of Bass, as do Ben Murphy and Carl Loben in their bass music title Renegade Snares.

From the 26th April to the 26th of August 2024 an early edition of All Crews was featured as an artefact in the Beyond The Bassline exhibition at the British Library curated by Aleema Gray and Mykaell Riley.

=== Academic reception ===
The book has been cited as a source in articles and journals across a broad range of disciplines including: media studies, cultural studies, sociology of identity, popular dance studies, technological studies in popular music, psychedelic research, histiography and even contemporary archaeology.

In late 2021, Dr Chris Christodoulou, senior lecturer at Westminster School of Arts held an academic panel discussion about the book's importance as an academic text entitled 'The impact and significance of Brian Belle-Fortune’s ‘All Crew Muss Big Up’.

== Synopsis ==
The book is a collection of chapters that vary in writing style, length and format. Each chapter covers a range of topics relating to Jungle Drum & Bass culture.

The earlier chapters in the book examine the beginnings of Jungle Drum & Bass, and also explore the origins of key elements of the scene, including: crews, DJs, MCs, producers, pressing houses, labels, raves and promoters. Later chapters in the book cover other issues relating to Jungle Drum & Bass like violence in clubs; the scene's portrayal in the media and Jungle Drum & Bass's global impact.

Several chapters of All Crews are creative pieces informed by Belle-Fortune's own experiences within the scene. Belle-Fortune's creative voice combines London slang with Jungle Drum & Bass terminology.

One chapter of All Crews about the origins of the MC was written by MC Navigator.

== Editions ==
Initially published in 1999 as All Crew Muss Big Up, it was well received by the Jungle Drum & Bass Community, but sold out quickly, fell out of print and developed a cult following. It was reprinted in 2004 and re-released as All Crews: A Journey Through Jungle Drum & Bass Culture, featuring both the original text and also updated interviews and writing. All Crews has also been translated into Russian and Italian. While it is currently out of print, another updated edition is forthcoming in 2023.

Prior to the first edition of All Crews being published, several early versions of the book were produced. These have become extremely rare and hard to obtain, with Belle-Fortune himself comparing them to a 'white label' or 'Dubplate' edition of the book
