= Mysteries of Funk =

Studio album by Grooverider
- Released: 1998
- Genres: Drum and bass, jungle
- Length: 1:52:21
- Label: Sony
- Producer: Grooverider

Mysteries of Funk is an album by the English drum and bass artist Grooverider, released in 1998. The album's first single was "Rainbows of Colour".

The album peaked at No. 50 on the UK Albums Chart.

== Production ==
The album was engineered by Optical.

== Critical reception ==
Professional ratings
Review scores
Source	Rating
AllMusic	4.5/5 stars
Robert Christgau	(dud)
The Encyclopedia of Popular Music	3/5 stars
Melody Maker	4.5/5 stars
Rolling Stone	3/5 stars

The Washington Post thought that, "with its jazzy trumpets and congas and its ethereal synths, it seems to owe as much to the Star Trek TV show (which is sampled on several cuts) as to James Brown." Rolling Stone concluded that "there's something dutiful about the music, as if Grooverider simply made a record because he thinks that's what big-time DJs are supposed to do."

The Observer wrote that "the best passages of Mysteries of Funk entwine d'n'b's percussive intricacy with languorous jazzy moods of a Miles Davis hue ... Against this are dull 10-minute tracks stuck in a tape loop." The New York Times called Mysteries of Funk "an elegant record with many textures, many instruments and blissful serenity amid hurtling beats."

AllMusic wrote that the album "succeeds most when Groove is wrapping his drum'n'bass two-step around a distinctly mainstream attention to house and fusion ambience."

== Track listing ==
Disc 1
No.	Title	Length
1.	"Cybernetic Jazz"	12:18
2.	"Rainbows of Colour (feat. Roya Arab)"	8:21
3.	"On the Double"	8:45
4.	"Time & Space (feat. Sophie Barker)"	7:10
5.	"Where's Jack the Ripper"	9:14
6.	"Fly with Me"	1:56
7.	"C Funk (feat. Cleveland Watkiss)"	11:46

Disc 2
No.	Title	Length
1.	"Starbase 23"	10:20
2.	"Time & Space (feat. Sophie Barker) (Heaven Mix)"	3:03
3.	"Rivers of Congo"	8:28
4.	"Imagination [Part 1 & 2] (feat. Sophie Barker)"	8:25
5.	"560 Degrees"	7:21
6.	"Imagination [Part 3] (feat. Sophie Barker)"	4:55
7.	"Stay with Me"	10:01
8.	"Rainbows of Colour (feat. Roya Arab) (Heaven's Breath Mix)"	0:18

== Credits ==
- Grooverider – lead member, producer, programming, keyboards
- Optical – engineer
- Tom Harrison – bass
- Roya Arab – composer, performer, vocals
- Cleveland Watkiss – vocals
- Sophie Barker – vocals
- Andrew Blick – trumpet
