= Hardstep =

Subgenre of drum and bass

- Stylistic origins: Oldschool jungle; breakbeat hardcore; darkcore
- Cultural origins: Mid-1990s, United Kingdom
- Derivative forms: Techstep

Hardstep is a subgenre of drum and bass which emerged in the mid-1990s. It is characterized by a gritty production style that consists of an inner-city feel. The breaks are less choppy than oldschool jungle, and have faster and harder simple electronic melodies. One characteristic is an accentuated, and yet sparse percussive beat.

The genre found favor with junglists, and though it has been overtaken in popularity by techstep, the fans of the style still remain. Early hardstep artists include DJ Hype, DJ Ellis Dee, Grooverider, Phantasy, Jumping Jack Frost and DJ Zinc.
