= Ed Rush =

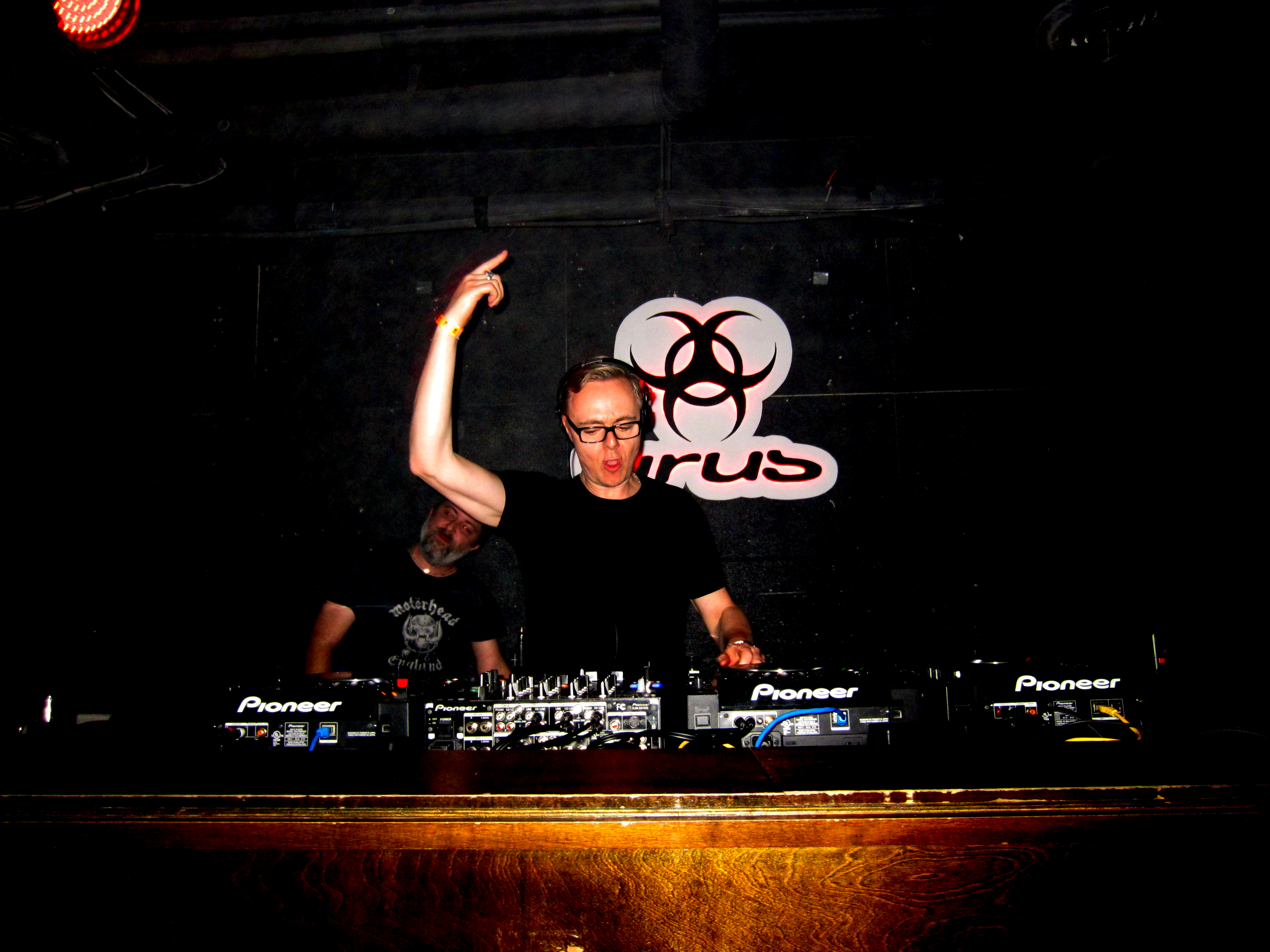
- Ed Rush in 2015
- Born: London, England
- Other name: Ben Dylan
- Occupations: Musician, DJ, producer
- Years active: 1992–present
- Musical career
- Genres: Electronic; jungle; drum and bass; breakbeat hardcore; techstep; neurofunk
- Instruments: Sampler, turntable, drum machine, synthesizer
- Labels: Metalheadz; No U-Turn; Prototype; Virus Recordings

Ben Settle, better known by the stage name Ed Rush, is an English musician and DJ who produces drum and bass music. Rush has been releasing records since 1992 primarily with Optical (Matt Quinn), his musical partner since 1997. Along with Optical, he is also the co-founder of the record label Virus Recordings, which releases his records along with other drum and bass acts. He is most associated with the aggressive styles of drum and bass music known as techstep, darkcore and neurofunk.

== Early career ==
Rush's first releases were a pair of self-released white label 12" singles, the Prince Jammy-sampling "I Wanna Stay in the Jungle" and "Look What They've Done" in late 1992. In early 1993, Rush begun playing on the London pirate radio station Don FM, where he was to first meet future production partner DJ Trace, resulting in the duo releasing the track "Don Bad Man", produced by engineer Nico Sykes. Shortly after, Rush recorded "Bludclot Artattack", which was released on Sykes' No U Turn Records. This release helped to influence the rave scene away from hardcore and into drum and bass. Rush's work grew increasingly uncompromising and dark: writing in the book Energy Flash: a Journey Through Rave Music and Dance Culture, Simon Reynolds wrote "Ed Rush's No U-Turn tracks 'Gangsta Hardstep' and 'Guncheck' took the explosive energy of hardcore and imploded it, transforming febrile hyperkinesis into molasses thick malaise."

As notoriety grew, Rush continued to collaborate, such as on "The Mutant" with DJ Trace in 1995. Additional releases on Grooverider's Prototype label and Goldie's Metalheadz further helped to establish Rush's reputation as a prominent drum and bass artist. In 1996, Rush and Trace coined the dense, hard style of jungle they were working on as "techstep" which went on to become the dominant style of drum and bass in the late 1990s. Rush's work with Trace and Nico on No U-Turn Records was compiled on the album Torque in 1997.

Together with Audio he forms the duo Killbox.

== Collaboration with Optical ==
In 1995 Rush met Matt Quinn, who worked under the stage name Optical. They met at the Music House, a dubplate mastering company in Islington, London where dubplates would be made for their DJ sets. Rob Playford, owner of the label Moving Shadow, gave them space in his Soho office building to allow them to build their own studio. They released their debut single Funktion in 1997, and followed it up in 1998 with their debut album, Wormhole, which has been described as the greatest drum and bass album of all time and introduced the style of drum and bass now known as Neurofunk. In 2000, DJ Craze used their track "Watermelon" in his beat-juggling routine, helping him win his 3rd DMC World Championship. In 2000, they released their second album, The Creeps (Invisible And Deadly!), which broadened their palette by introducing vocals to the mix Their third album, The Original Doctor Shade was released in 2003 and featured a collaboration with turntablist DJs, Scratch Perverts. In 2005, they took part in the 40 Artists, 40 Days project organised by the Tate Gallery in the run up to London's successful bid to win the right to host the 2012 Olympics and Paralympics. 2006 saw the release of their fourth album Chameleon which saw them using a live band for the first time and three years later followed with Travel the Galaxy. Their track Frontline was use in the soundtrack to the 2008 video game Wipeout HD. In 2014, Ministry of Sound described them as one of the most influential artists in drum and bass.

Their most recent album, No Cure, was released in October 2015. The same year also saw the release of their first headline mix featured as part of the long running Fabriclive series of mix CDs, FabricLive.82. They had a long relationship with the London club Fabric having played at the opening weekend in 1999 and appearing on the first drum and bass mix released by Fabric in 2002 (FabricLive.06 mixed by Grooverider). Following Islington Council's decision to revoke Fabric's licence in September 2016, Ed Rush & Optical took part in a benefit show to challenge the decision. In November 2016 agreement was reached to reopen the club.

In addition to many club appearances, Rush and Optical have appeared at festivals, including Glastonbury in 1999 and 2014, and Bestival in 2013.

They have also collaborated and remixed several other artists including: Goldie, Skunk Anansie,Lil' Louis (French Kiss) and Rudimental featuring John Newman (Not Giving In). They themselves have been remixed by other artists such as Pendulum, who remixed their track Bacteria in 2004.

As well as his work with Optical, Rush has also released house music under the name Ben Dylan.

Ed Rush is a play on the phrase "head rush", which was slang in the rave scene for a temporary whiteout caused by too many Es.

== Discography ==
=== Solo discography ===
Albums

- Torque No U-Turn (1997) with Trace and Nico
- Light Of The Void Blackout Music (2024)

Singles

- I Wanna Stay In The Jungle (1992)
- Look What They've Done (1992)
- Bludclott Artattack No U-Turn (1993)
- Don Bad Man Lucky Spin Recordings (1993)
- Selecta Jet Star Records (1994)
- The Force Is Electric / Gangsta Hardstep No U-Turn (1995)
- Guncheck No U-Turn (1995)
- Westside Sax / August No U-Turn (1995)
- Baracuda Part 1 Deejay Recordings (1996)
- Technology / Neutron No U-Turn (1996)
- Killamanjaro / Subway Prototype (1996)
- Mad Different Methods Nu Black (1996)
- Mothership No-U-Turn (1996)
- What's Up / August (Remix) No U-Turn (1996)
- Sector 3 / Comatone (Nutcut) No U-Turn (1996)
- Skylab / Density / The Raven Metalheadz (1996)
- Sector 3 / Coma Tone No U-Turn (1996)
- Cutslo (Lokuste Remix) / Alien Girl Prototype (1998)
- Kinetic / Tenshi Space Recordings (2005)
- Edtrafiencial No U-Turn (2009) with Trace, Fierce, Nico and Optical
- Book Of Sight / Arcadia Virus Recordings (2010)
- Dark Days / Lost In Tha Game AudioPorn Records (2011)
- Pheromone (2013)
- Scarabs / Box Car Piranha Pool (2014)

=== With Ed Rush & Optical ===
Albums

- Wormhole Virus Recordings (1998)
- The Creeps (Invisible And Deadly!) Virus Recordings (2000)
- The Original Doctor Shade Virus Recordings (2003)
- Chameleon Virus Recordings (2006)
- Travel the Galaxy Virus Recordings (2009)
- No Cure Virus Recordings (2015)

Singles

- Funktion / Naked Lunch V Recordings (1997)
- Lifespan / Crisis Virus Recordings (1998)
- Medicine / Life Crisis Virus Recordings (1998)
- The Medicine / Punchbag Virus Recordings (1998)
- Wormhole Album Sampler Virus Recordings (1998)
- Zardoz / Satellites Virus Recordings (1998)
- Bacteria / Gasmask Virus Recordings (1999)
- Watermelon / Sick Note Virus Recordings (1999)
- Socom EP Virus Recordings (2000)
- KerbKrawler / Capsule Virus Recordings (2001)
- Pod Virus Recordings in (2001)
- Pacman (Ram Trilogy Remix) / Vessel Virus Recordings (2002)
- Innocence / Rehab Quarantine Recordings (2002)
- Remixes Vol. 1 Virus Recordings (2004) (UK #77)
- The Remixes Vol. 2 Virus Recordings (2004) (UK #69)
- Reece / Sick Note (Illskills Remix) Virus Recordings (2005)
- Reece / Taxi Driver Virus Recordings (2005)
- Crack Ball / Ride The Beast RUN DNB (2010)
- Brain Bucket / Falling Through Vision Recordings (2010)

DJ Mixes

- Out of the Box (2004)
- Virus Vaults (2005)
- FabricLive.82 Fabric Recordings (2015)
