= Grooverider =

British DJ (born 1967)

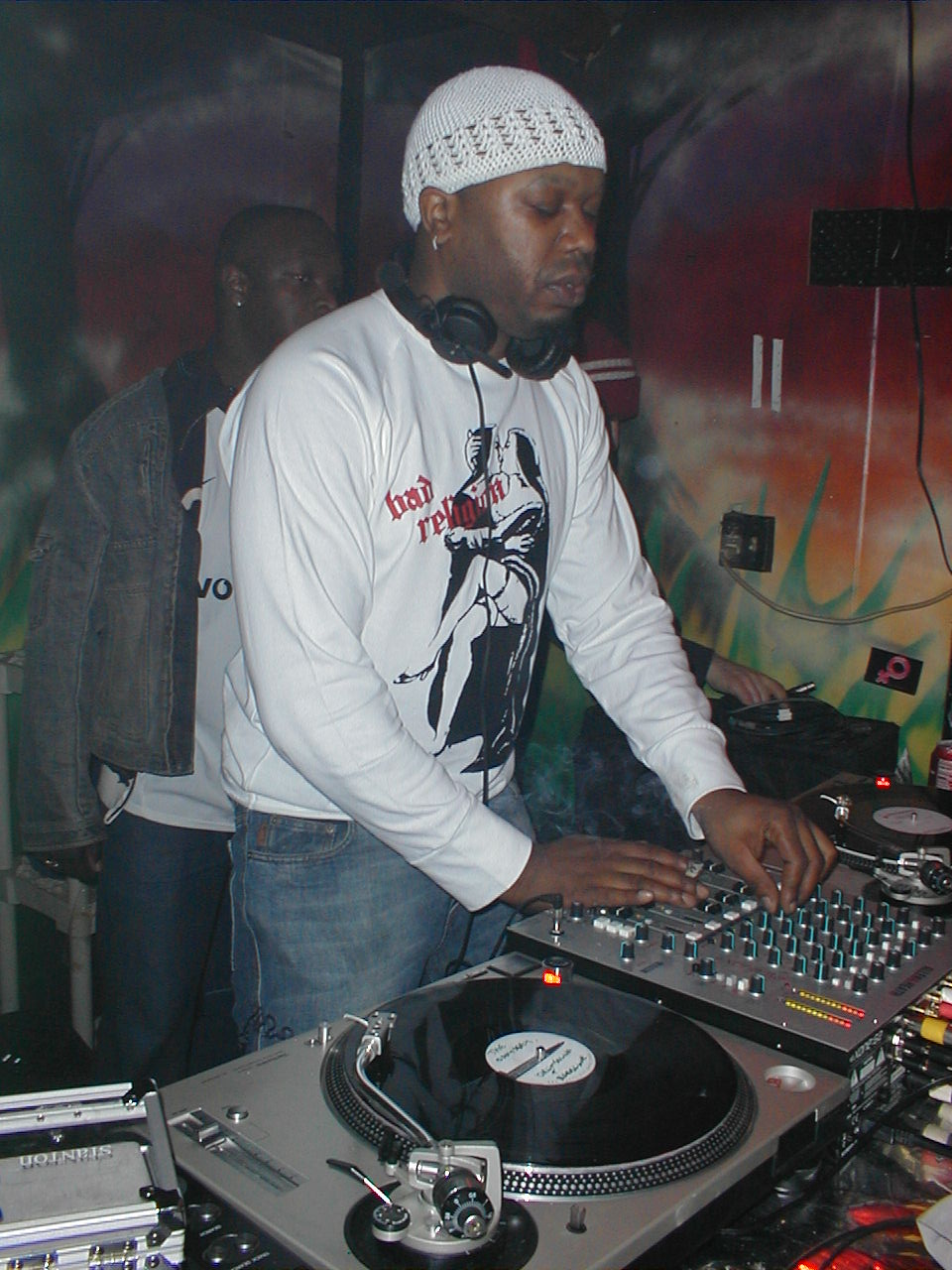

Background information
- Also known as: Codename John, Inta Warriors
- Born: Raymond Bingham; 16 April 1967 (age 59); Streatham, London, England
- Genres: Drum and bass
- Occupations: Producer, DJ
- Years active: 1980s–present
- Website: http://www.grooverider.co.uk

Raymond Bingham (born 16 April 1967 in Streatham, London, England), better known as Grooverider, is a British drum and bass DJ. He and DJ partner Fabio are regarded as "originators" of the scene.

== Biography ==
Grooverider began his DJing at illegal raves and warehouse parties in the UK in the late 1980s, and rose to prominence with partner Fabio through his sets at club nights such as the groundbreaking 'Rage' at Heaven. Grooverider was also on the London pirate radio station, Faze 1, in the mid-1980s alongside Fabio and DJs including Colin Dale, Dave Angel, and Booker T. He originally played soul, hip hop and disco but later played house, upon being converted whilst hearing "Mysteries of Love" by Mr. Fingers.

Fabio and Grooverider began playing house at Brixton club Mendozas. From there the pair went on to a venue in Barrington Road in Brixton, but it was not until 1991 that they would really make their mark. That year, Grooverider and Fabio took up a residency at Rage and the breakbeat hardcore scene exploded. Throughout the 1990s, Grooverider released tracks as Codename John and helped build the reputations of Matrix and Boymerang with releases on his own record label, Prototype.

With Fabio, he hosted a radio show on Kiss 100 from 1994 to 1997. In 1997, Grooverider compiled the album Prototype Years which featured the best tracks by various artists who appeared on his label. Prototype is known for its sporadic releases, which have included drum and bass work by Dillinja, Drumsound & Bassline Smith, Ed Rush, Photek and Optical. In 1998, he and Fabio brought their radio show to a national audience on BBC Radio 1.

As a recording artist, Grooverider has released one album, Mysteries of Funk (Sony 1998), produced in conjunction with Optical, and a number of remixes including his reworkings of Jonny L's "Piper" plus Roni Size/Reprazent's "Share the Fall". In 2005, he was holding a weekly Sunday session called Grace at the London club, Herbal.

On 24 November 2007, Grooverider was arrested at Dubai International Airport for possession of 2.16 grams of cannabis, which he claimed he had forgotten was in a pair of his trousers. "I must have forgotten the spliff," he said in an interview. "It was a small amount. Back home I would not even get prosecuted." On 19 February 2008, he was sentenced to four years' imprisonment, to be followed by immediate deportation (four years is the mandatory sentence for drug possession in the United Arab Emirates). He was pardoned and released on 3 September 2008, during the holy month of Ramadan that traditionally sees the pardoning of select prisoners in UAE. In an interview with BBC, Grooverider described his experience and the conditions in which he was placed as "appalling".

Grooverider returned to the BBC Radio 1 drum and bass show with Fabio in October 2008, until it finally ended in March 2012. Since September 2016, they have brought their long-running radio show to London's Rinse FM.

== Selected discography ==
=== Albums ===
- Mysteries of Funk (Higher Ground, 1998) – UK No. 50

=== Singles ===
- "Sinister (The Influence Remix)" (Reinforced Records, 1993)
- "Your Love Is Yours" (as Inta-Warriors) (Dee Jay, 1993)
- "Dreams of Heaven" (as Inta-Warriors) (Dee Jay, 1993)
- "Dreams of Heaven" / "Kindred" (as Codename John) (Prototype, 1994)
- "Deep Inside" / "Inta" (as Codename John) (Prototype, 1994)
- "The Warning" (as Codename John) (Metalheadz, 1997)
- "Rainbows of Colour" / "Jack the Ripper" / "Mysteries of Funk" (Higher Ground, 1998)

=== Mixes and compilations ===
- Grooverider Presents: The Prototype Years (Higher Ground, 1997)
- Essential Rewindz (Renegade Hardware, 2000)
- Pure Drum & Bass (Telstar, 2000)
- The Harder They Come (Renegade Hardware, 2002)
- FabricLive.06 (Fabric, 2002)
- Fabio & Grooverider – Drum & Bass Arena (Resist, 2004)
- Grooverider / Loxy & DJ Ink – Guerrilla Warfare (Renegade Hardware, 2005)
- Andy C & Grooverider – Drum & Bass Arena (Resist, 2007)

=== Remixes ===
- Carl Cox – "I Want You (State of the Arts Mix)" (Perfecto, 1991)
- Isotonik – "Different Strokes (Grooverider Mix)" (FFRR, 1991)
- Doc Scott – "NHS (Inter Natty Remix)" (Absolute 2, 1992)
- Tronik House – "Uptempo (Grooverider Mix)" (KMS, 1992)
- The Renegade – "Terrorist (Groove Rider Remix)" (Moving Shadow, 1994)
- UB40 – "One in Ten (The John Remix)" (DEP International, 1996)
- Jonny L – "Piper (Grooverider Remix)" (XL Recordings, 1997)
- The Stone Roses – "Fools Gold (Grooverider's Mix)" (Jive Electro, 1999)
