= Techstep =

Heavy subgenre of drum and bass

- Stylistic origins: Drum and bass; industrial; hardstep; darkcore; techno; Belgian hardcore techno
- Cultural origins: Mid-1990s, Great Britain
- Derivative forms: Breakcore; darkstep; neurofunk

Other topics
- List of drum and bass artists; drum and bass record labels

Techstep is a dark subgenre of drum and bass that was created in the mid-1990s.

== Style ==
It is characterized by a dark, sci-fi mood, near-exclusive use of synthesised or sampled sound sources, hardstep kicks and snares and influences from industrial and techno music, what some writers have described as a "clinical" sound. Although described as having a "techy" feel, techstep's relationship with techno should not be overstated. It shares the technique of creating a high-energy collage from abstract, synthetic noises, including samples, bleeps and squelches: it rarely uses instruments that have not been processed by effects. Similarly, quantized drum-machine kit and percussion sounds are favored over naturalistic human breakbeats. However, it usually adheres to drum and bass norms in other regards, especially in terms of musical structure, with the emphasis on the "drop". Techstep saw jungle music's obsession with bass change, from aiming for low and deep to exploring timbre, artists aiming to outdo each other with ever more distorted and "twisted" bass sounds.

== History ==
Techstep developed from jungle music and hardstep around 1995. The name of the genre was coined by Ed Rush and Trace, who were both instrumental in shaping the sound of techstep. In this case, "tech" did not refer to the smoother style of Detroit techno, but to the raver, more caustic hardcore sounds that were popular in Belgium in the earlier part of the decade, often known as Belgian techno. Techstep was a reaction to the appearance of more pop and virtuosic musical elements on jungle and drum 'n' bass tracks, which were seen as an adulteration of "true" or "original" jungle. Instead the genre was infused with a simpler, colder sound that stripped away most R&B elements, and replaced them with a more hardcore sound, and ideological influences like dystopian films like Blade Runner and RoboCop.
One of the first incarnations of the techstep sound is DJ Trace's remix of T-Power's "Mutant Jazz" which appeared on S.O.U.R. Recordings in 1995. This remix, co-produced by Ed Rush and Nico, features the trademark stepping beats and distorted Reese bassline which would become symbolic of the techstep genre. The Torque compilation (No U Turn), the Techsteppin' compilation (Emotif), Breakage LP (Penny Black 1997), and Platinum Breakz 1, 2, and MDZ 01 (Metalheadz) feature some selections of techstep tracks.

Some of the original techstep producers eventually developed the neurofunk style. These included early pioneers Ed Rush and Optical. Artists such as Teebee and Noisia further developed the Neurofunk sound. Moving Shadow and Metalheadz were important labels in the development of the style.

== See also ==
- Digital hardcore
- Breakbeat
- Breakbeat hardcore
- Dubstep
- Breakcore
- Darkstep
