= Darkcore =

UK rave subgenre of breakbeat hardcore

- Stylistic origins: Breakbeat hardcore
- Cultural origins: Early 1990s, United Kingdom
- Derivative forms: Drum and bass

Darkcore (also referred to as darkside hardcore) is a music subgenre of breakbeat hardcore in the UK rave scene, that emerged from late 1992. It is recognised as being one of the direct precursors of the genre now known as drum and bass.

== Origins ==
By late 1992, breakbeat hardcore was beginning to fragment, and darkcore was one of the subgenres to emerge, in contrast with 4-beat. Darkcore is often characterised by dark-themed samples such as horror movie elements, cries for help, sinister sounding stabs and synthesizer notes, along with syncopated breakbeats in addition to 4-to-the-floor beats and low frequency basslines. It also saw the introduction of effects such as pitch shifting and time stretching to create mood.

== Notable releases ==
Notable releases include Top Buzz's "Living in the Darkness" (Basement, 1993), DJ Hype's "Shot in the Dark" (Suburban Base, 1993), Origin Unknown's "Valley of the Shadows" (RAM Records, 1993), Ed Rush's "Bloodclot Artattack" (No U Turn, 1993), Rufige Cru's "Terminator" (Reinforced Records, 1992), Doc Scott's "Here Comes the Drumz" (Reinforced Records, 1992), 4hero's "Journey from the Light" (Reinforced Records, 1993), and Omni Trio's "Feel Good" (Moving Shadow, 1993).

== See also ==
- Breakbeat hardcore
- Jungle
- Drum and bass
