= Neurofunk =

Subgenre of drum and bass

- Stylistic origins: Drum and bass; funk; techstep; house; techno; dark ambient; industrial music; film score
- Cultural origins: Late 1990s, United Kingdom
- Derivative forms: Glitch hop

Fusion genres
- Neurohop

Other topics
- List of jungle and drum and bass artists; drum and bass record labels

Neurofunk (also known informally as neuro) is a subgenre of drum and bass which emerged from England in the mid-to-late 1990s as a stylistic diversion from techstep.

== History ==
Music critic Simon Reynolds coined the term neurofunk in a December 1997 article in The Wire. He also discussed it in his 1998 book Energy Flash: A Journey Through Rave Music and Dance Culture. He described it as a stylistic shift from techstep and as "the fun-free culmination of jungle's strategy of cultural resistance: the eroticization of anxiety".

Early examples of such music diverging from techstep, leading to Reynolds coining the term neurofunk, include Ed Rush and Optical's Funktion (1997) single for V Recordings, as well as on their first album Wormhole (1998) for Virus Recordings. As with any musical subgenre, there is no clearly defined and agreed explanation as to how neurofunk might have evolved since Reynolds coined the term.

== Characteristics ==
Simon Reynolds distinguished the emerging style from techstep by its cleaner production, intricate basslines, and emphasis on subtle changes in timbre. He also identified a shift toward more regular two-step rhythms and away from the dense polyrhythms of earlier jungle.

Later neurofunk production emphasizes bass sounds with complex, changing timbres. Techniques described by Computer Music include wavetable synthesis, frequency modulation synthesis, filtering, distortion, and resampling. Modulation creates movement in the bass sound's midrange harmonics, while a consistent low-frequency component provides its underlying weight. The magazine cites Noisia, Phace, and Mefjus as examples of producers whose bass sounds involve extensive processing and resampling.
