= Drum and bass =

Type of electronic music

- Other names: DnB; drum 'n' bass; D&B
- Stylistic origins: Jungle; breakbeat hardcore; techno; dub; reggae fusion; house; ambient; darkcore; electronica; breakbeat; industrial
- Cultural origins: Early 1990s, United Kingdom
- Typical instruments: Drum machine; sampler; synthesizer; turntables; computer
- Derivative forms: Dubstep; UK garage; grime; footwork

Subgenres
- Darkstep; hardstep; jump up; liquid funk; neurofunk; techstep; drumfunk; technoid; drill 'n' bass

Fusion genres
- Breakcore; digital hardcore; raggacore

Regional scenes
- Sambass

Other topics
- List of jungle and drum and bass artists; drum and bass record labels; history of drum and bass; junglist; breakcore; glitch; experimental music

An example of a D&B song in the subgenre of liquid D&B. Example music: Niemo - Small Talk Build IV

Drum and bass (D&B), also known as drum 'n' bass (DnB or D'n'B), is a genre of electronic dance music that emerged in the United Kingdom in the early 1990s. It is characterised by fast breakbeats (typically 165–185 beats per minute) with heavy bass and sub-bass lines, samples, and synthesizers.

Originating in the UK jungle scene in the early 1990s, drum and bass drew on elements of reggae, dub, hip-hop, breakbeat hardcore, techno, and house. By the mid-1990s, it had become one of the most distinctive and technically innovative styles within the broader electronic dance music movement. The style of drum and bass often incorporates an array of influences from other genres including ambient, funk, jazz, soul, rock, and pop. The genre has since developed multiple subgenres and maintains both an underground and mainstream presence worldwide.

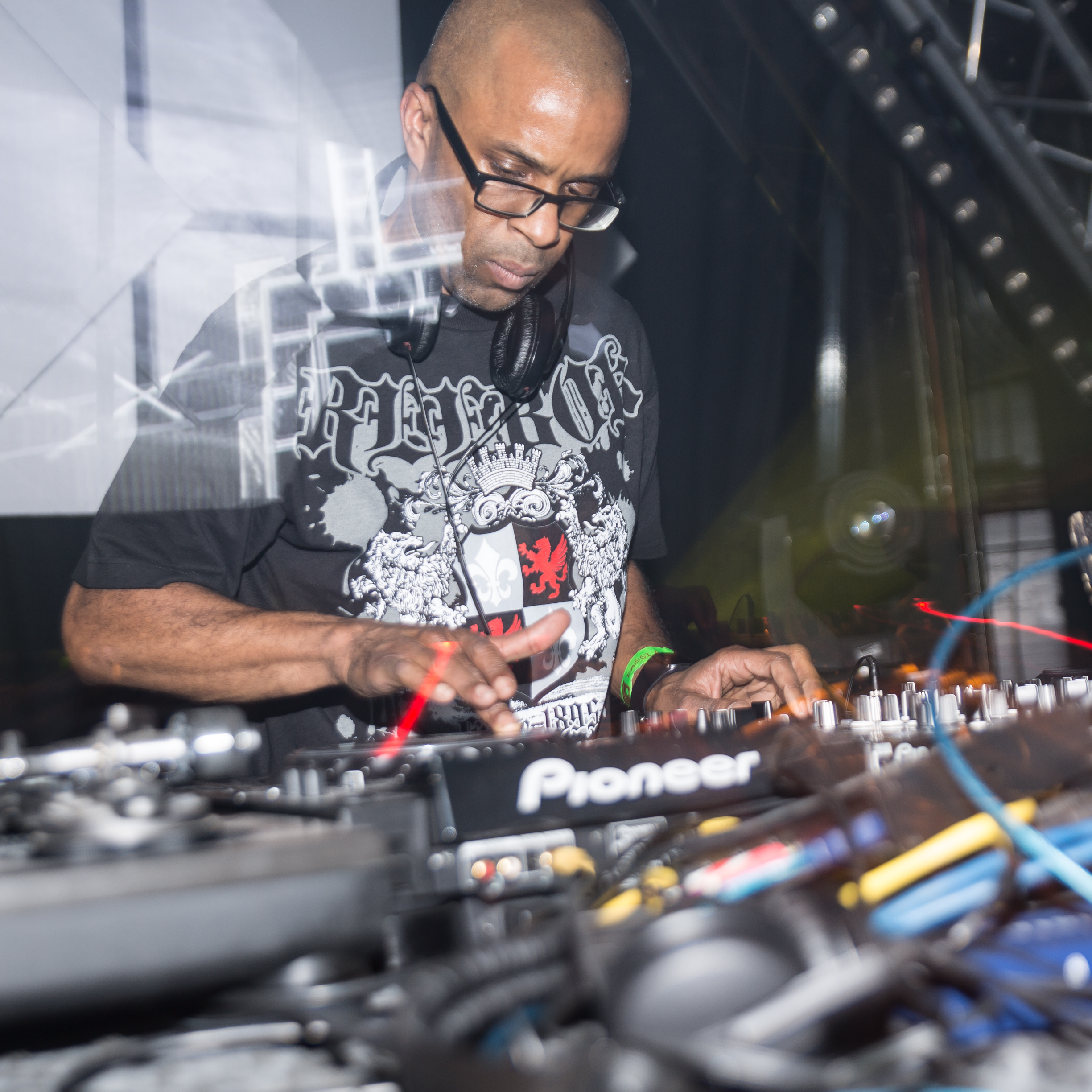
DJ Dextrous, a trailblazer in the early days of Jungle music, seen here during a performance in Switzerland in 2015.

The popularity of drum and bass at its commercial peak ran parallel to several other UK dance styles. A major influence was the original Jamaican dub and reggae sound that influenced jungle's bass-heavy sound. Another feature of the style is the complex syncopation of the drum tracks' breakbeat. Drum and bass subgenres include breakcore, ragga jungle, hardstep, darkstep, techstep, neurofunk, ambient drum and bass, liquid drum and bass, jump up, drumfunk, sambass, and drill 'n' bass. Drum and bass has influenced other genres such as big beat, dubstep, trip hop and has been influenced by hip-hop, house, ambient music, techno, jazz, rock and pop.

Drum and bass is dominated by a relatively small group of record labels. Major international music labels had shown very little interest in the drum and bass scene until BMG Rights Management acquired RAM in February 2016. Since then, the genre has seen a significant growth in exposure. Whilst the origin of drum and bass music is in the UK, the genre has evolved considerably with many other prominent fanbases located all over the world.

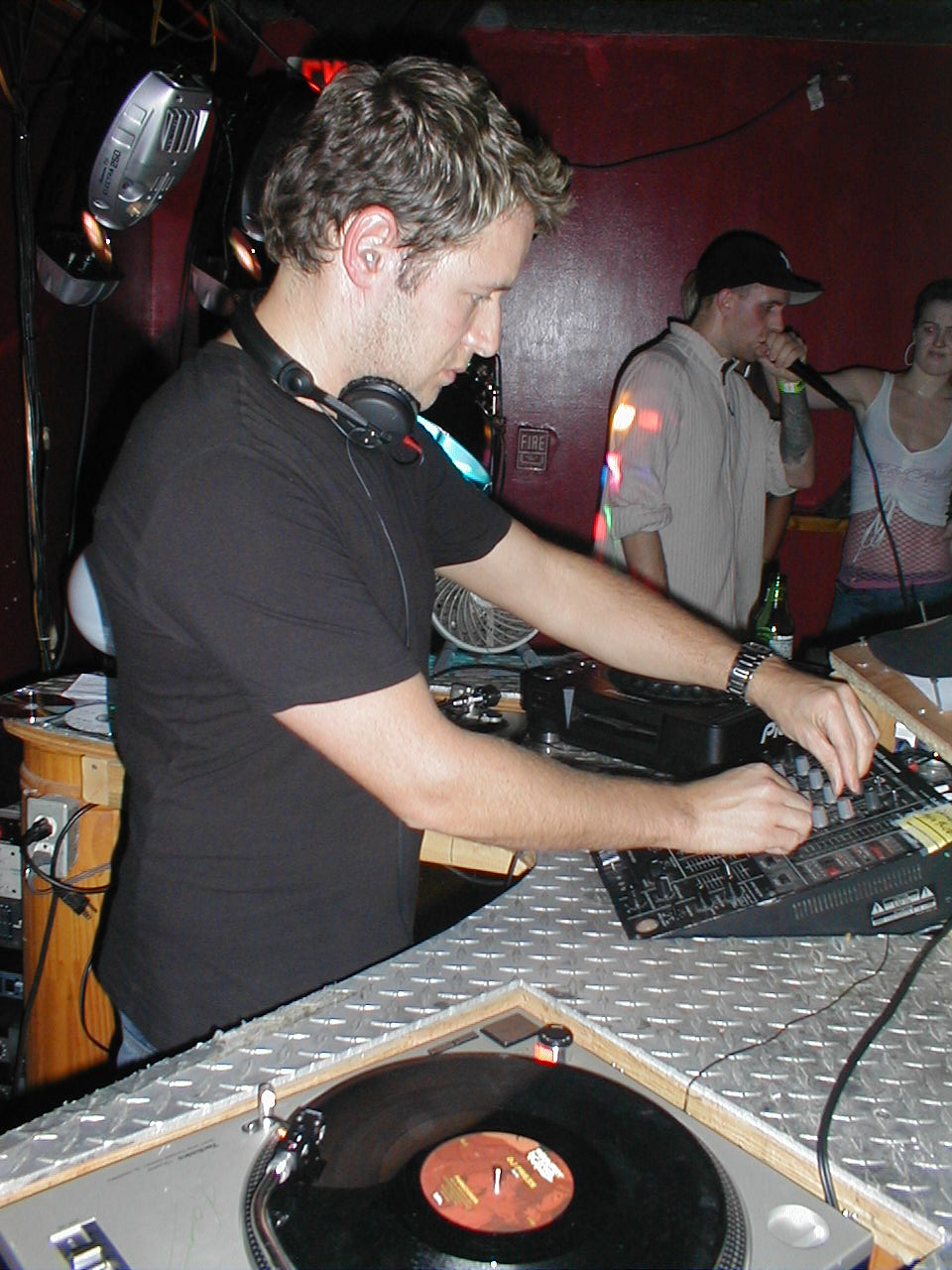
Adam F performs at Listen at Club Alchemy in New Haven, Connecticut, on 3 September 2006.

== History ==
=== Origins ===
Drum and bass traces its roots to the UK rave scene and breakbeat hardcore of the late 1980s. Tracks such as Lennie De Ice's We Are I.E. (1991) combined breakbeats with reggae-influenced basslines and are often cited as precursors to jungle and drum and bass. Early producers including 4hero, Doc Scott, LTJ Bukem, Goldie, and Grooverider began shaping the sound by stripping away elements of hardcore rave music and emphasising bass and complex drum patterns.

=== Mid-1990s: Jungle and mainstream recognition ===
By 1994, jungle—a style closely related to and often overlapping with early drum and bass—had entered mainstream UK youth culture. It was associated with sound system traditions, MC culture, and samples from reggae and dancehall. The genre further developed, incorporating and fusing elements from a wide range of existing musical genres, including the raggamuffin sound, dancehall, MC chants, dub basslines, and increasingly complex, heavily edited breakbeat percussion. Despite the affiliation with the ecstasy-fuelled rave scene, jungle also inherited associations with violence and criminal activity, both from the gang culture that had affected the UK's hip-hop scene and as a consequence of jungle's often aggressive or menacing sound and themes of violence (usually reflected in the choice of samples). However, this developed in tandem with the often positive reputation of the music as part of the wider rave scene and dancehall-based Jamaican music culture prevalent in London. By 1995, whether as a reaction to, or independently of this cultural schism, some jungle producers began to move away from the ragga-influenced style and create what would become collectively labelled, for convenience, as drum and bass.

=== Late 1990s: Expansion and subgenres ===
Additional subgenres emerged in mid-1990s including techstep, influenced by techno and science-fiction aesthetics. Parallel to these, more melodic and accessible forms like liquid funk emerged, pioneered by artists such as High Contrast and Calibre. Drum and bass became more polished and technically sophisticated in the mid-late 1990s. Subgenres such as hardstep, jump up, ragga, jazzstep and what was known as intelligent drum and bass emerged. Roni Size & Reprazent's album New Forms (1997) won the Mercury Prize, signalling wider critical recognition. Drum and bass began to expand its reach from pirate radio to commercial stations and gain widespread acceptance in the late 1990s, when darker styles such as neurofunk developed.

The 2000s saw drum and bass spread globally, with scenes developing in continental Europe, North America, Australia, and Brazil (where "sambass" fused local rhythms with D&B).

The emergence of related styles such as liquid funk in the 2000s brought a wave of new artists incorporating new ideas and techniques, supporting continual evolution of the genre.

=== 2010s – 2020s: Digital era and resurgence ===
With the growth of digital distribution and streaming platforms, drum and bass continued to evolve in the 2010s. Artists such as Pendulum, Chase & Status, and Netsky achieved mainstream chart success while maintaining ties to the underground scene.

In the 2020s, the genre has experienced renewed popularity. In 2021, Pitchfork noted a "rising zoomer affinity" for the genre in the 2020s. Streaming in the UK grew by approximately 94% between 2021 and 2024, with a majority of listeners under age 34. Emerging artists such as Nia Archives, Bou, and goddard., alongside established acts like Chase & Status, Sub Focus, and Hybrid Minds, have brought drum and bass to wider audiences through festivals, collaborations, and viral tracks. Purple Sneakers described a "drum n' bass Renaissance" occurring at the time of the publication of their articles in 2023.

== Musical features ==
Drum and bass incorporates a number of scenes and styles, from the highly electronic, industrial sounds of techstep to the use of conventional, acoustic instrumentation that characterise the more jazz-influenced end of the spectrum. The sounds of drum and bass are extremely varied due to the range of influences behind the music. Drum and bass could at one time be defined as a strictly electronic musical genre, with the only "live" element being the DJ's selection and mixing of records during a set. "Live" drum and bass using electric, electronic and acoustic instruments played by musicians on stage emerged over the ensuing years of the genre's development.

=== Influences ===
A very strong influence on jungle and drum and bass, thanks to the British African-Caribbean sound system scene, is the original Jamaican dub and reggae sound, with pioneers such as King Tubby, Peter Tosh, Sly & Robbie, Bill Laswell, Lee Perry, Mad Professor, Roots Radics, Bob Marley and Buju Banton heavily influencing the music. This influence has lessened over time, but is still evident, with many tracks containing ragga vocals.

As a musical style built around funk or syncopated rock and roll breaks, James Brown, Al Green, Marvin Gaye, Ella Fitzgerald, Gladys Knight & the Pips, Billie Holiday, Aretha Franklin, Otis Redding, the Supremes, the Commodores, Jerry Lee Lewis, and even Michael Jackson acted as funk influences on the music. Jazz pioneer Miles Davis has been named as a possible influence. Blues artists such as Lead Belly, Robert Johnson, Charlie Patton, Muddy Waters and B. B. King have also been cited by producers as inspirations. Even modern avant-garde composers such as Henryk Gorecki have received mention. One of the most influential tracks in drum and bass history was "Amen Brother" by The Winstons, which contains a drum solo that has since become known as the "Amen break", which, after being extensively used in early hip-hop music, went on to become the basis for the rhythms used in drum and bass.

Kevin Saunderson released a series of bass-heavy, minimal techno cuts as Reese/The Reese Project in the late '80s, which were hugely influential in drum and bass. One of his more famous basslines (Reese—"Just Want Another Chance", Incognito Records, 1988) was indeed sampled on Renegade's Terrorist and countless others since, being known simply as the 'Reese' bassline. He followed these up with equally influential (and bassline-heavy) tracks in the UK hardcore style as Tronik House in 1991–1992. Another Detroit artist who was important to the scene was Carl Craig. The sampled-up jazz break on Craig's Bug in the Bassbin was also influential on the newly emerging sound. DJs at the Heaven nightclub on "Rage" nights used to play it as fast as their Technics record decks would go, pitching it up in the process.

By the late 1980s and early 1990s, the tradition of breakbeat use in hip-hop production had influenced the sound of breakbeat hardcore, which in turn led to the emergence of jungle, drum and bass, and other genres that shared the same use of broken beats. Drum and bass shares many musical characteristics with hip-hop, though it is nowadays mostly stripped of lyrics. Grandmaster Flash, Roger Troutman, Afrika Bambaata, Run DMC, Mac Dre, Public Enemy, Schooly D, N.W.A, Kid Frost, Wu-Tang Clan, Dr. Dre, Mos Def, Beastie Boys and the Pharcyde are very often directly sampled, regardless of their general influence.

Clearly, drum and bass has been influenced by other music genres, though influences from sources external to the electronic dance music scene perhaps lessened following the shifts from jungle to drum and bass, and through to so-called "intelligent drum and bass" and techstep. It still remains a fusion music style.

Some tracks are illegally remixed and released on white label records (technically bootleg), often to acclaim. For example, DJ Zinc's remix of Fugees' "Ready or Not", also known as "Fugee Or Not", was eventually released with the Fugees' permission after talk of legal action, though ironically, the Fugees' version infringed Enya's copyright to an earlier song. White labels, along with dubplates, played an important part in drum and bass musical culture.

=== Drum elements ===
==== Sampling ====
The Amen break was synonymous with early drum and bass productions but other samples have had a significant impact, including the Apache, Funky Drummer, "Soul Pride", "Scorpio" and "Think (About It)" breaks. Early pioneers often used Akai samplers and sequencers on the Atari ST to create their tracks.

==== Synthesis ====
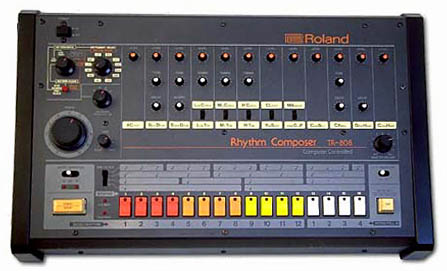
The Roland TR-808 Rhythm Composer, produced 1980–1984, had a bass drum sound which became very important in drum and bass.

Of equal importance is the TR-808 kick drum, an artificially down-pitched or elongated bass drum sound sampled from Roland's classic TR-808 drum machine, and a sound which has been subject to a large amount of experimentation over the years.

==== Rhythm composition ====
Many drum and bass tracks have featured more than one sampled breakbeat in them and a technique of switching between two breaks after each bar developed. A more recent commonly used break is the "Tramen", which combines the Amen break, a James Brown funk breakbeat ("Tighten Up" or "Samurai" break) and an Alex Reece drum and bass breakbeat.

The relatively fast drum beat forms a canvas on which a producer can create tracks to appeal to almost any taste and often will form only a background to the other elements of the music. Syncopated breakbeats remain the most distinctive element as without these a high-tempo 4/4 dance track could be classified as techno or gabber.

The complex syncopation of the drum tracks' breakbeat is another facet of production on which producers can spend a very large amount of time. The Amen break is generally acknowledged to have been the most-used (and often considered the most powerful) break in drum and bass.

=== Bass elements ===
The genre places great importance on the bassline, in this case a deep sub-bass musical pattern which can be felt physically through powerful sound systems due to the low-range frequencies favoured. There has been considerable exploration of different timbres in the bass line region, particularly within techstep. The bass lines most notably originate from sampled sources or synthesizers. Bass lines performed with a bass instrument, whether it is electric, acoustic or a double bass, are less common.

=== Atmospheric elements ===
Atmospheric pads and samples may be added over the fundamental drum and bass to provide different feels. These have included "light" elements such as ambient pads as found in ambient electronica and samples of jazz and world musics, or "dark" elements such as dissonant pads and sci-fi samples to induce anxiety in the dancer.

=== Vocal and melodic elements ===
Old-school DnB usually included an MC providing vocals. Some styles (such as jazz-influenced DnB) also include melodic instruments soloing over the music.

=== Tempo ===
Drum and bass is usually between 160 and 180 BPM, in contrast to other breakbeat-based dance styles such as nu skool breaks, which maintain a slower pace at around 130–140 BPM. A general upward trend in tempo has been observed during the evolution of drum and bass. The earliest forms of drum and bass clocked in at around 130 bpm in 1990/1991, speeding up to around 155–165 BPM by 1993. Since around 1996, drum and bass tempos have predominantly stayed in the 170–180 range. Recently, some producers have started to once again produce tracks with slower tempos (that is, in the 150-170 bpm range), but the mid-170s tempo is still a hallmark of the drum and bass sound.

A track combining the same elements (broken beat, bass, production techniques) as a drum and bass track, but with a slower tempo (say 140 BPM), might not be drum and bass, but instead may qualify as a drum and bass-influenced breakbeat track.

=== Drop ===
Many mixing points begin or end with a "drop". The drop is the point in a track where a switch of rhythm or bassline occurs and usually follows a recognisable build section and breakdown. Sometimes, the drop is used to switch between tracks, layering components of different tracks, as the two records may be simply ambient breakdowns at this point. Some DJs prefer to combine breakbeats, a more difficult exercise. Some drops are so popular that the DJ will "rewind" or "reload" or "lift up" the record by spinning it back and restarting it at the build. The drop is often a key point from the point of view of the dance floor, since the drum breaks often fade out to leave an ambient intro playing. When the beats re-commence they are often more complex and accompanied by a heavier bassline, encouraging the crowd to begin dancing.

== Live performance ==
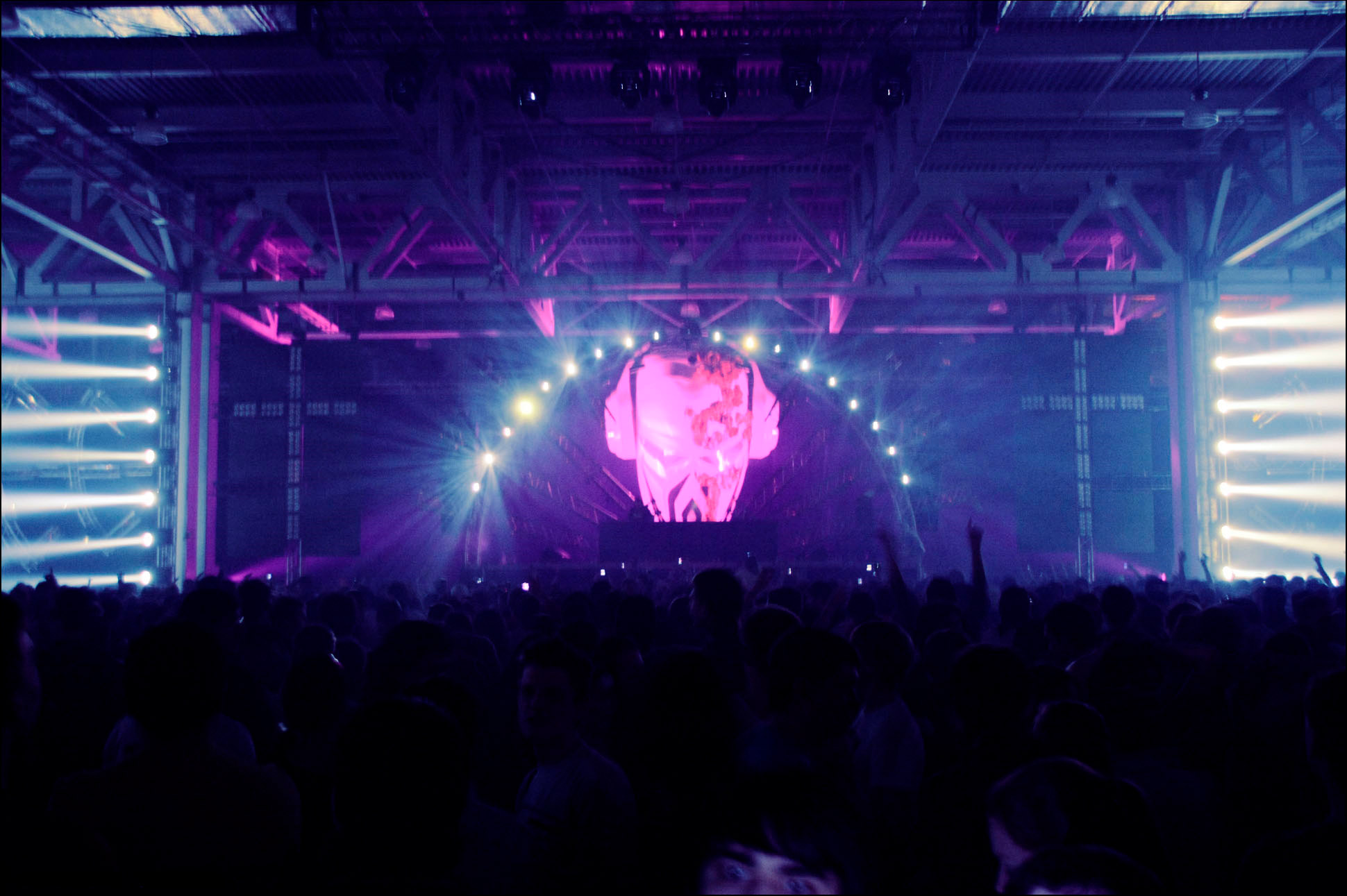
Aphrodite in 2009 at Pirate Station, the world's largest drum and bass festival at that time, in Moscow

Drum and bass exhibits a full frequency response which can sometimes only be fully appreciated on sound systems which can handle very low frequencies, including sub-bass frequencies that are often felt more than heard. As befits its name, the bass element of the music is particularly pronounced, with the comparatively sparse arrangements of drum and bass tracks allowing room for basslines that are deeper than most other forms of dance music. Drum and bass tracks are meticulously designed to create a hard-hitting emotional impact, with the drums complementing the bass to deliver a pulsating, powerful experience. Consequently, drum and bass parties are often advertised as featuring uncommonly loud and bass-heavy sound systems.

However, there are many albums specifically designed for personal listening. The DJ mix is a particularly popular form of release, with a popular DJ or producer mixing live, or on a computer, a variety of tracks for personal listening. Additionally, there are many albums containing unmixed tracks, suited for home or car listening.

=== DJ performance ===
Although this practice has declined in popularity, DJs are often accompanied by one or more MCs, drawing on the genre's roots in hip-hop and reggae/ragga.

MCs do not generally receive the same level of recognition as producer/DJs, and some events are specifically marketed as being MC-free. There are relatively few well-known drum and bass MCs, mainly based in London and Bristol, including Stevie Hyper D (deceased), MC Conrad (deceased), the Ragga Twins, Dynamite MC, MC Skibadee (deceased) and MC Tali.

=== Live instrument performance ===
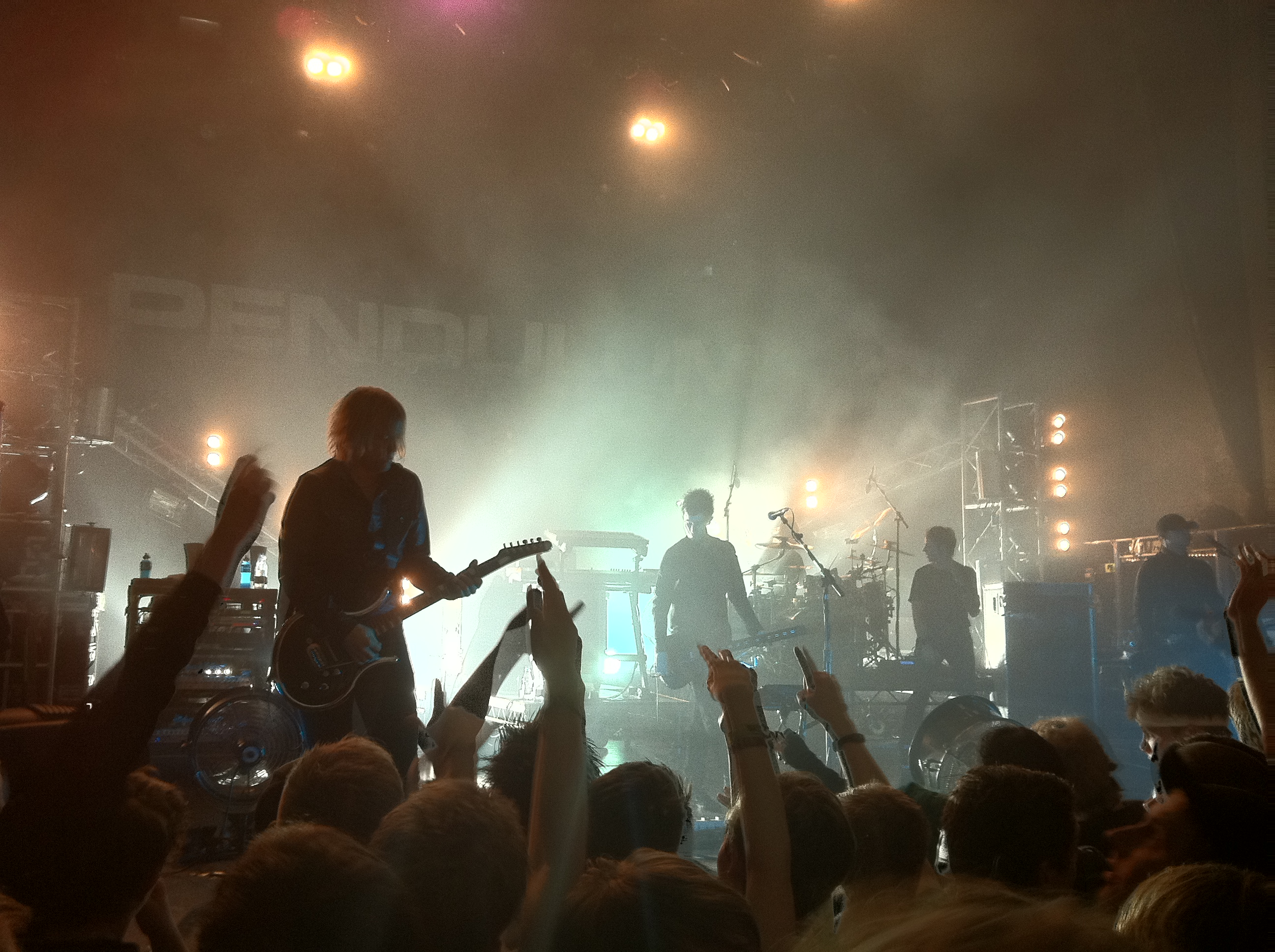
Pendulum performing live in 2010

Many musicians have adapted drum and bass to live performances, which feature instruments such as drums (acoustic or electronic), samplers, synthesizers, turntables, bass (either upright or electric) and guitars (acoustic or electric). Samplers have also been used live by assigning samples to a specific drum pad or key on drum pads or synthesizers. MCs are frequently featured in live performances.

== Subgenres ==
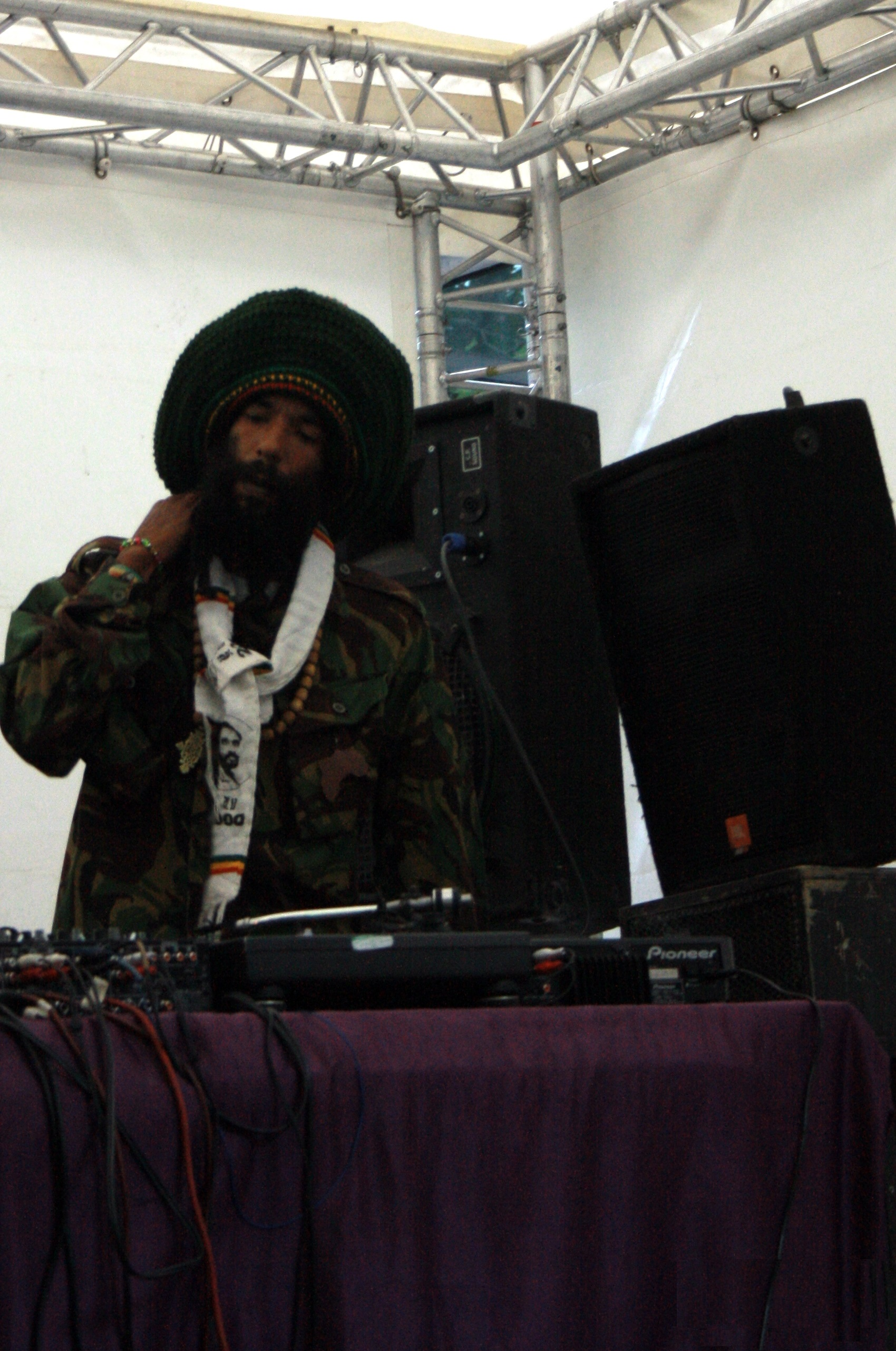
Congo Natty, a ragga jungle artist

Smaller scenes within the drum and bass community have developed and the scene as a whole has become much more fractured into specific subgenres, which have been grouped into "light" (influenced by ambient, jazz, and world music) and "heavy" (influenced by industrial music, sci-fi, and anxiety) styles, including:

=== Mainstream drum and bass ===
- Jump-up, appearing in the mid-1990s, employs heavy and energetic drum and bass, characterised by robotic and heavy bass sounds. It also is generally less serious and contains more humour than other subgenres.
- Drumstep or halftime is a combination of drum and bass and dubstep, where the beat structure is half time, while the remaining elements still adhere to the usual sub-bass and tempo of drum and bass.
- Drill 'n' bass (also known as fungle and spunk jazz) consists of very complex and chopped up rhythms, rapid and irregularly syncopated basslines and often ambient elements similar to earlier subgenres of IDM (like ambient techno). The subgenre was developed by names like Squarepusher, Luke Vibert (known as Plug) and Aphex Twin.

=== Light drum and bass ===
- Intelligent drum & bass or intelligent jungle is a smoother style, influenced by ambient music, chillout, jazz and soul music. It was pioneered by such artists as Omni Trio, Peshay, William Orbit, Seba, Blu Mar Ten, Deep Blue, Photek, LTJ Bukem and his label Good Looking Records, and the label Moving Shadow.
- Jazzstep, jazzy jungle, jazz & bass or drum & jazz demonstrates heavy influence by jazz and trip hop. It uses typical jazz scales, rhythms and instrumentation. It was pioneered by artists such as Alex Reece and LTJ Bukem, and was also utilized in DJ sets by early trip hop producers and DJs such as Kruder & Dorfmeister, Nightmares on Wax, Kid Loco, Thievery Corporation, and Mr. Scruff.
- Liquid drum and bass (or simply "liquid") draws heavily on harmonic and melodic grooves.
- Sambass, a Brazilian drum and bass style, incorporates elements from samba, bossa nova and other Latin music styles. Pioneered by artists such as DJ Marky.

=== Heavy drum and bass ===
- Darkstep is characterised by fast drums and a general dark mood, drawing influences from dark ambient, industrial and hardcore music.
- Techstep is characterised by sci-fi soundscapes and samples from science fiction culture. Pioneered by artists such as Bad Company UK, Ed Rush, Optical, Dom & Roland, and the label Moving Shadow.
- Neurofunk or neuro is the progression from techstep incorporating more elements from jazz and funk.
- Hardstep is a harder style which uses gritty basslines and heavy yet simple electronic melodies.
- Metal & bass or bass metal is a style which specifically uses heavy metal guitar riffs. Pioneered by artists such as Concord Dawn, Counterstrike, Pendulum, The Qemists, Dirtyphonics, Zardonic and others.
- Crossbreed is the amalgamation of industrial hardcore and drum and bass often combined with influences of metal and breakcore. It emerged in the mid-2000s, pioneered by record labels such as Prspct Recordings, Yellow Stripe and Future Sickness Records. Notable artists include Switch Technique, Gancher & Ruin, Cooh, Counterstrike, Katharsys, Sinister Souls and Lucy Furr.

=== Genres influenced by drum and bass ===
Born around the same time as jungle, breakcore and digital hardcore share many of the elements of drum and bass. To the uninitiated, tracks from the extreme end of drum and bass may sound identical to breakcore thanks to speed, complexity, impact and maximum sonic density combined with musical experimentation. German drum and bass DJ The Panacea is also one of the leading digital hardcore artists. Raggacore resembles a faster version of the ragga-influenced jungle music of the 1990s, similar to breakcore but with more friendly dancehall beats (dancehall itself being a very important influence on drum and bass). Darkcore, a direct influence on drum and bass, was combined with influences of drum and bass itself leading to the creation of darkstep. There is considerable crossover from the extreme edges of drum and bass, breakcore, darkcore, digital hardcore and raggacore with fluid boundaries.

Intelligent dance music (IDM) is a form of art music based on DnB and other electronic dance musics, exploring their boundaries using ideas from science, technology, contemporary classical music and progressive rock, often creating un-danceable, art gallery style music.

Ghettotech, a club music genre from Detroit, contains synth and basslines similar to drum and bass.

== Industry ==
=== Record labels ===
Drum and bass is dominated by a small group of record labels. These are mainly run by DJ-producers.

List of DnB record labels and their owners
Label	Owner(s)
Reinforced Records	Marc Mac & Dego (4hero)
Hospital Records	London Elektricity
RAM Records	Andy C, Scott Bourne
Metalheadz	Goldie
UKF Music	Luke Hood
Creative Source Records	Fabio, Sarah Sandy
King of the Jungle Records	DJ Dextrous
Subverseive Recordings	DJ Dextrous
State of the Art Recordings	DJ Dextrous
Critical Music	Kasra
Shogun Audio	DJ Friction
Breakbeat Kaos	Adam F & DJ Fresh
Virus Recordings	Ed Rush, Optical
V Recordings	Bryan Gee and Jumpin Jack Frost
Playaz	DJ Hype
NoCopyrightSounds	Billy Woodford
Liquicity	Maduk, Maris Goudzwaard

Prior to 2016, the major international music labels such as Sony Music and Universal had shown very little interest in the drum and bass scene, with the exception of some notable signings, including Pendulum's In Silico LP to Warner. Roni Size's label played a big, if not the biggest, part in the creation of drum and bass with their dark, baseline sounds. V Recordings also played a large part of the development of drum and bass.

BMG Rights Management acquired Ram Records in February 2016, making a strategic investment to help RAM Records. It has been pushing the boundaries of drum and bass further into the mainstream with artists such as Chase and Status and Sub Focus.

Now defunct labels include—DJ Hype's True Playaz (known as Real Playaz as of 2006); Rob Playford's Moving Shadow, running from 1990 until 2007, which played a pivotal role in the 1990s drum and bass scene, releasing records by artists such as Foul Play and Omni Trio.

=== Formats and distribution ===
==== Purchasing ====
Originally drum and bass was mostly sold in 12-inch vinyl single format. With the emergence of drum and bass into mainstream music markets, more albums, compilations and DJ mixes started to be sold on CDs. As digital music became more popular, websites focused on electronic music, such as Beatport, began to sell drum and bass in digital format.

==== Distributors (wholesale) ====
The bulk of drum and bass vinyl records and CDs are distributed globally and regionally by a relatively small number of companies such as SRD (Southern Record Distributors), ST Holdings, & Nu Urban Music Limited.

As of 11 September 2012, Nu Urban ceased trading and RSM Tenon were instructed to assist in convening statutory meetings of members and creditors to appoint a liquidator. This left many labels short on sales, as Nu Urban were one of the main distributors for the vinyl market in the drum and bass scene.

=== Regional scenes ===
==== Anglosphere ====
Despite its roots in the UK, which is still treated as the "home" of drum and bass, the style has firmly established itself around the world. There are strong scenes in other English-speaking countries including Australia, New Zealand, South Africa, and the United States.

=== Media presence ===
Today, drum and bass is widely promoted using different methods such as video sharing services like YouTube and Dailymotion, blogs, radio, and television, the latter being the most uncommon method. More recently, music networking websites such as SoundCloud and Mixcloud have become powerful tools for artist recognition, providing a vast platform that enables quick responses to new tracks. Record labels have adopted the use of podcasts. Prior to the rise of the internet, drum and bass was commonly broadcast over pirate radio.

==== Radio ====
The three highest-profile radio stations playing drum and bass shows are BBC Radio 1 with The Drum and Bass Show – formerly with Friction, who was replaced with René LaVice in 2017, simulcast in the US and Canada on Sirius XM, and DJ Hype on Kiss 100 in London. Fabio and Grooverider previously held a long-standing drum and bass show on Radio 1. Radio 1 also had the One in the Jungle show.

The BBC's Black music station BBC Radio 1Xtra used to feature the genre heavily, with DJ Bailey (show axed as of 29 August 2012) and Crissy Criss (show axed as of August 2014) as its advocates. The network also organises a week-long tour of the UK each year called Xtra Bass. London pirate radio stations have been instrumental in the development of drum and bass, with stations such as Kool FM (which continues to broadcast today having done so since 1991), Origin FM, Don FM (the only drum and bass pirate to have gained a temporary legal licence), Renegade Radio 107.2FM, Rude FM, Wax FM and Eruption among the most influential.

As of 2015, despite higher profile stations such as 1Xtra scaling back their drum and bass specialist coverage, the genre has made its way into UK top 10 charts with drum and bass inspired tracks from artists such as Rudimental and Sigma. Earlier in August 2014, before Crissy Criss' show was axed, the BBC held a whole prime time evening event dedicated to showcasing drum and bass by allowing four major labels to participate.

As of November 2014, six drum & bass songs had reached the no.1 spot on the UK's top 40 chart, since the genre was first being played on the radio, around 1993. The first of these was in 2012. The fact that all six of these songs reached number 1 in only two years shows the increase in popularity and commercialisation of the genre in recent years. The artists who produced these songs are Sigma, Rudimental and DJ Fresh (all had two No.1 hits).

==== Internet radio ====
Internet radio stations, acting in the same light as pirate stations, have also been an instrumental part in promoting drum and bass music; the majority of them funded by listener and artist donations.

Drum and bass was supported by Ministry of Sound radio from the early 2000s until 2014 and later featuring Tuesday shows from labels such as Metalheadz, Fabio & Grooverider, DJ Marky, Viper Recordings, Shogun Audio and Hospital Records. From September 2015, Ministry abruptly dropped all non-mainstream genres to focus on mainstream EDM, causing disappointment amongst the fans of the D&B community.

===== North American radio =====
In Toronto since 1994, The Prophecy on 89.5 CIUT-FM with Marcus Visionary, DJ Prime and Mr. Brown, is North America's longest running jungle radio show.

Album 88.5 (Atlanta) and C89.5fm (Seattle) have shows showcasing drum and bass.

Seattle also has a long-standing electronica show known as Expansions on 90.3 FM KEXP. The rotating DJs include Kid Hops, whose shows are made up mostly of drum and bass. In Columbus, Ohio WCBE 90.5 has a two-hour electronic only showcase, All Mixed Up, Saturday nights at 10 pm. At the same time, WUFM 88.7 plays its Electronic Playground.

Tulsa, Oklahoma's rock station, 104.5 The Edge, has a two-hour show starting at 10 pm Saturday nights called Edge Essential Mix, mixed by DJ Demko, showcasing electronic and drum and bass style. While the aforementioned shows in Ohio rarely play drum and bass, the latter plays the genre with some frequency.

In Tucson, Arizona, 91.3 FM KXCI has a two-hour electronic show known as Digital Empire, Friday nights at 10 pm (MST). Resident DJ Trinidad showcases various styles of electronica, with the main focus being drum and bass, jungle and dubstep.

In Augusta, Georgia, Zarbizarre of the Cereal Killaz hosts a show called FreQuency on WHHD on Friday nights from 11 pm until 1 am, showcasing drum and bass during the second hour of the show.

==== Magazines ====
The best-known drum and bass publication was Kmag magazine (formerly called Knowledge Magazine) before it went completely online in August 2009. Although it is still live, after 20 years Kmag ceased updating their site at the end of 2016. Kmag has announced a book to celebrate their 25th anniversary to be published in December 2019. Kmag's publishing arm, Vision, published Brian Belle-Fortune's All Crews in 2004.

Other publications include the longest-running drum and bass magazine worldwide, ATM Magazine, and Austrian-based Resident. London-based DJ magazine has also been running a widely respected drum and bass reviews page since 1994, written by Alex Constantinides, which many followers refer to when seeking out new releases to investigate. In 2012 he stopped writing the reviews, and they are now contributed by Whisky Kicks.

== Mainstream acceptance ==
The earliest mainstream drum and bass releases include Goldie's album Timeless from 1995. Other early examples include the Mercury Music Prize-winning album New Forms (1997) from Reprazent; 4hero's Mercury-nominated Two Pages from 1998; and then, in the 2000s, Pendulum's Hold Your Colour in 2005 (the best-selling drum and bass album).

In 2012, drum and bass achieved its first UK No. 1 single, "Hot Right Now", by DJ Fresh, which was one of the fastest-selling singles of 2012 at the time of release, launching the career of Rita Ora in the process. In total, there has been seven drum and bass songs to hit number one in the UK. DJ Fresh's Hot Right Now (featuring Rita Ora) in 2012, Rudimental's Feel the Love (featuring John Newman) in 2012 and Waiting All Night (featuring Ella Eyre) in 2013, Sigma's Nobody to Love and Changing (featuring Paloma Faith) both in 2014, Kenya Grace's Strangers in 2023 and Chase & Status and Stormzy's BACKBONE in 2024.

Numerous video games (such as Hudson Soft's Bomberman Hero, Hi-Rez Studios' Tribes: Ascend, Electronic Arts' Need for Speed: Undercover, Rockstar Games' Grand Theft Auto series, and Sony's Wipeout series from Pure onward) have contained drum and bass tracks. Microsoft Studios' Forza Horizon 2, 3, 4 and 5 feature a Hospital Records radio channel dedicated to the genre.

The genre has some popularity in film soundtracks. Hive's "Ultrasonic Sound" appeared on The Matrix's soundtrack, and the E-Z Rollers' song "Walk This Land" appeared in the film Lock, Stock and Two Smoking Barrels. Ganja Kru's "Super Sharp Shooter" can be heard in the 2006 film Johnny Was.

The Channel 4 show Skins uses the genre in some episodes, notably in the first series' third episode, "Jal", where Shy FX and UK Apache's "Original Nuttah" was played in Fazer's club.

== See also ==
- Dogs on Acid
- List of electronic music genres
- List of jungle and drum and bass artists
