= History of drum and bass =

Drum and bass (commonly abbreviated to DnB, D&B, Drum n Bass and Drum & Bass) is an electronic music genre that originated in the UK rave scene having developed from breakbeat hardcore (and its derivatives of darkcore, and hardcore jungle). The genre would go on to become one of the most popular genres of electronic dance music, becoming international and spawning multiple different derivatives and subgenres.

== United Kingdom ==
Drum and bass began as a musical paradigm shift of the United Kingdom breakbeat hardcore and rave scene of the mid 1990s; and over the first decade and a half of its existence there have been many permutations in its style, incorporating elements from dancehall, electro, funk, hip hop, house, jazz, pop-created fusion of hardcore, house and techno (also including new beat). This scene existed briefly from approximately 1989-1993, a period of cross-pollination in the UK hardcore sound. This sound did survive in various forms in its mother countries - primarily Belgium, the Netherlands and Germany - beyond 1992, but by then the general scenes in these countries had moved forwards to trance, industrial techno or Gabber (with happy hardcore/hard house being the equivalent 'Belgian Techno' - derivative sounds in the UK). London and Bristol are the two cities which are most associated with Drum and Bass. Birmingham and the West Midlands also had an extensive influence, especially around Digbeth, acting as a hub for Drum and Bass, hosting some of the UKs fledgling drum and bass events and godfathers of the genre Goldie and Doc Scott both local to the area.

Returning to the UK, drum and bass (as jungle) has its direct origins in the breakbeat hardcore part of the UK acid house rave scene. Hardcore DJs typically played their records at fast tempos, and breakbeat hardcore emphasised breakbeats over the 4-to-the-floor beat structure common to house music. Breakbeat hardcore records such as The Prodigy's "Experience" (1992) Top Buzz 'Jungle Techno!' (1991), A Guy Called Gerald's 'Anything' (1991), Shut Up and Dance's "£10 to get in" / "£20 to get in" (both 1989), the Ragga Twins' "Spliffhead" (1990) & '18 Inch Speaker' (1991), Rebel MC's 'Wickedest Sound' (1990), 'Coming On Strong' (1990), 'Tribal Bass' (1991) & 'African' (1991) Nightmares on Wax's 'Aftermath' & 'In Two Minds' (1990), Genaside II's "Sirens of Acre Lane" (1990), DJ Dextrous' "Ruffneck Biznizz" (1992), Noise Factory's 'Be Free' (1992), Demon Boyz 'Jungle Dett' (1992) and LTJ Bukem's "Demon's Theme" (1992) are generally credited as being among the first to have a recognizable drum and bass sound.

Some hardcore tracks at the time were extremely light and upbeat; the most extreme examples of this were the so-called "toy-town" tracks such as Smart E's' "Sesame's Treat" which features the children's show "Sesame Street" theme song, sometimes referred to as Toytown Techno. A style of hardcore with light and upbeat sounds and a predominant kick drum, with less emphasis on breakbeats, would many years later be known as happy hardcore. These were particularly prominent in the summer of 1992 when hardcore crossed over commercially in the UK and its charts.

In response to these lighter tracks, some producers started focusing on darker, more aggressive sounds; this style became known as darkside hardcore, or Darkcore. Strange noises and effects, syncopated rhythms made from rearranged funk breaks and loud bass lines defined the genre. Examples of darkcore include Goldie's "Terminator" (1992), Doc Scott's "Here Come The Drumz", and Top Buzz's "Living In Darkness" (1992). These took their cue from the darker sounds of 'Belgian Techno', as found in tracks such as Joey Beltram's "Mentasm" and "Energy Flash" (1991), as well as the dark breaks of 4 Hero's "Mr Kirks Nightmare" (1990) among others. These tracks were not widely called jungle or drum and bass by the mainstream media at their time of creation (although the terms "hardcore jungle" and "jungle techno" were in common use in the rave scene by then, with "drum & bass" appearing here and there on particular mixes of several vinyl releases), but they can nevertheless be found on later jungle and drum and bass compilations. The first major round-up of these tracks which was to use the term 'drum & bass' was probably "The Dark Side - Hardcore Drum & Bass Style": a compilation on React Records, released March 1993, which featured both "Here Comes The Drumz" and "Terminator".

This darker, more aggressive sound appealed to many in the dancehall and reggae communities. A shared emphasis on rhythm and bass, and the tempos were well suited to be mixed together. Soon many elements of dancehall reggae were being incorporated into the hardcore sound, and a precursor to what would become known as simply jungle was sometimes dubbed hardcore jungle. The Jamaican sound-system culture began to influence the emerging sound through the use of basslines and remixing techniques derived from dub and reggae music, alongside the fast breakbeats and samples derived from urban musics such as hip hop, funk, jazz, and r&b alongside many production techniques borrowed from early electronic music such as house, and techno.

As the yet unnamed genre evolved, the use of sampled funk breakbeats became increasingly complex. Most notable and widely spread is the Amen break taken from a b-side funk track "Amen, Brother" by the Winston Brothers (The Winstons). During this time producers began cutting apart loops and using the component drum sounds to create new rhythms. To match the complex drum lines, basslines which had less in common with the patterns of house and techno music than with the phrasings of dub and hip hop began to be used. As the beat-per-minute range rose above 165, the emerging drum and bass sound became incompatible for straightforward DJ mixing with house and techno, which typically range dozens of beats-per-minute less (making it impossible to play the tracks at the same speed on club equipment). This sonic identity became highly distinctive for both the depth of its bass and the increasingly complex, rapid-fire breakbeat percussion. Vastly different rhythmic patterns were distinctively being used, as well as new types of sampling, synthesis and effects processing techniques, resulting in a greater focus on the intricacies of sampling/synthesis production and rhythm. This notably included early use of the time stretching effect which was often used on percussion or vocal samples. As the influences of reggae and dub became more prominent, the sound of drum and bass began to take on an urban sound which was heavily influenced by ragga and dancehall music as well as hip hop, often incorporating the distinctive vocal styles of these musical genres. This reggae/dancehall influenced sound is most commonly associated with the term jungle.

A Guy Called Gerald "28 Gun Bad Boy" (1992)
30 second sample illustrating the combination of basslines, broken beats, rave melody and aesthetics.

Particular tracks from the 1992 - 1993 period that demonstrated some of the beat and sampling progression within drum and bass include: A Guy Called Gerald's "28 Gun Bad Boy", Bizzy B "Ecstacy is a Science" (1993), DJ Dextrous/King of the Jungle's "Lovable", and Danny Breaks / Droppin Science "Droppin Science vol 1" (1993). This was an ongoing process however and can be demonstrated as a gradual progression over dozens of tracks in this period.

By late 1993, the drum and bass sound was particularly evident in the release "Unreleased Metal" (by Doc Scott and Goldie and which launched the Metalheadz label in 1994) and the "Internal Affairs EP" (by Goldie and 4hero).

=== Early pioneers ===
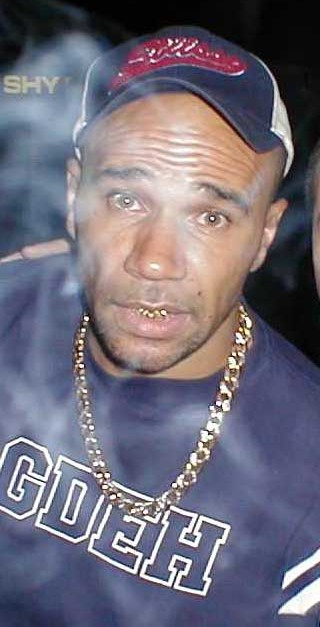
Goldie, one of the pioneers of drum and bass music and perhaps its most widely recognized face

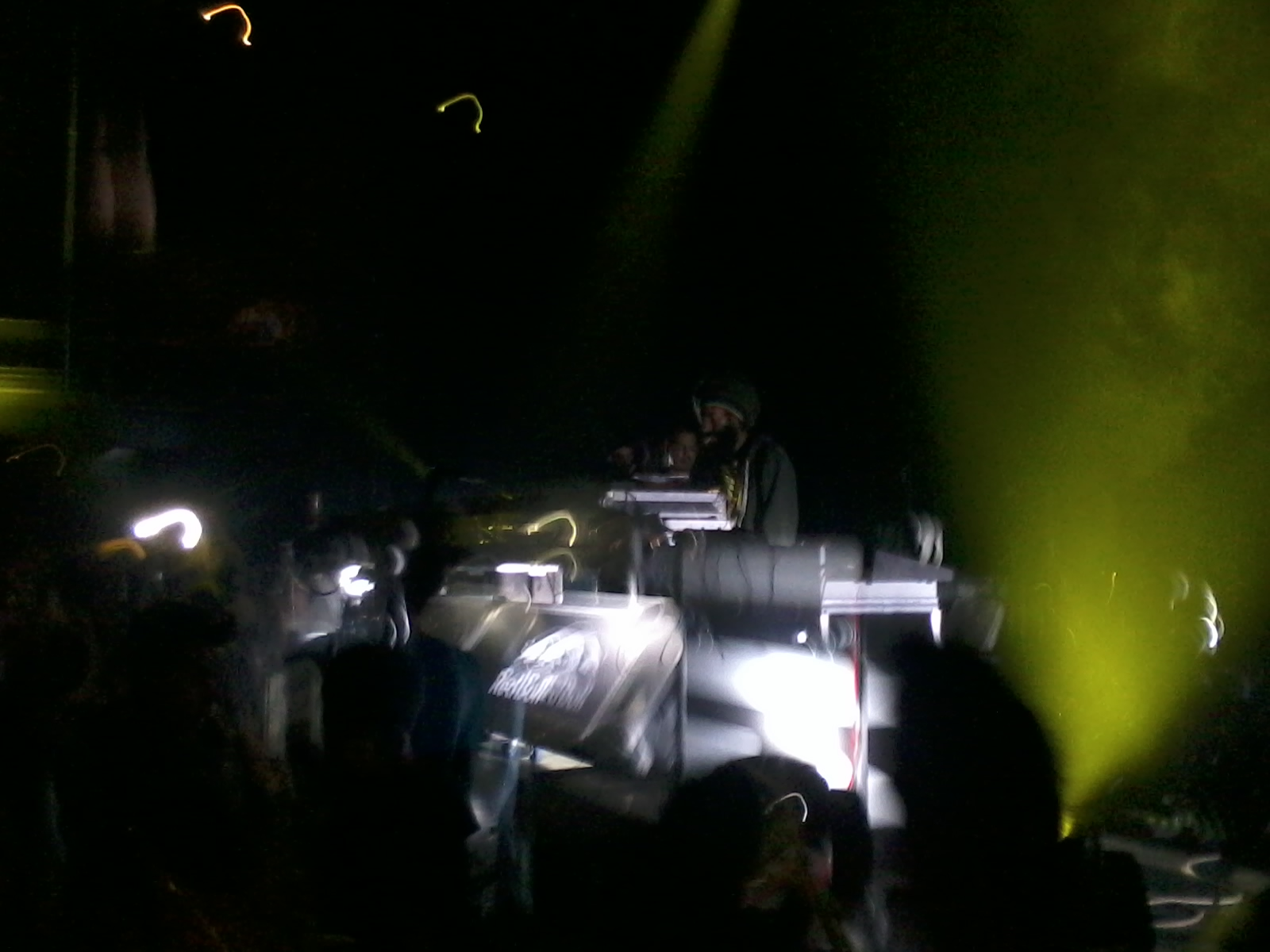
Congo Natty aka Rebel MC

Pioneers such as Bizzy B, Shy FX, Andy C, DJ Hype, Grooverider, Goldie, LTJ Bukem and others quickly became stars of the genre.

Most of the early producers and DJs still produce and play in today's drum and bass scene, forming something of a jungle 'old guard'. Some important early artists such as A Guy Called Gerald with his seminal early jungle LP ("Black Secret Technology") and 4hero ("Mr Kirk's Nightmare") later developed their own styles, leaving the drum and bass mainstream.

These early pioneers heavily used Akai samplers and sequencers on the Atari ST to create their tracks. Without these electronic instruments, the first wave of consumer priced but versatile electronic instruments, it is doubtful drum and bass (or many electronic music styles) could have appeared.

=== Jungle name ===
While the origin of the term 'jungle' music to refer to the developing electronic sound of the 1990s is debatable, the emergence of the term in musical circles can be roughly traced to Jamaican/Caribbean toasting (a precursor to modern MCs), circa 1970. References to 'jungle', 'junglists' and 'jungle music' can be found throughout dub, reggae and dancehall genres from that era up until today. It has been suggested that the term 'junglist' was a reference to a person either from a section of Kingston, Trenchtown also known as 'the Concrete Jungle' or from a different area, 'the Gardens', which was a leafy area colloquially referred to as 'the Jungle'. The first documented use of the term in drum and bass is within a song featuring jungle producer and lyricist Rebel MC - "Rebel got this chant alla the junglists".

=== Junglists ===
The appearance of jungle also resulted in the appearance of the junglist subculture, which, while not nearly as distinctive, alienated, ideological or obvious as other youth subcultures, and having many similarities with hip hop styles and behaviour, does function distinctively within the drum and bass listening community. Many drum and bass listeners would and do refer to themselves as junglists, regardless of their attitude on whether jungle differs from drum and bass (see below).

== Jungle to drum and bass ==
The phrase "drum and bass" was sometimes used in the seventies to name dub versions of reggae songs. With titles on b-sides of 7 inches, like 'Drum and bass by King Tubby's'. Also you can hear the phrase in reggae songs from artists like Jah Tomas with the often sampled phrase 'strictly drum and bass make you wind up your waist'. Or in album titles, like 'Show Case (In a Roots Radics Drum and Bass)' from Tristan Palmer. The phrase "drum and bass" had also been used for years previously in the London soul and funk pirate radio scenes and was even a bit of a catchphrase for UK Radio 1 DJ Trevor Nelson in his pirate days, who used it to describe the deeper, rougher funk and "rare groove" sound that was popular in London at the time. A station ID jingle used on London pirate Kiss FM from the late 1980s would proclaim "drum and bass style on Kiss". However, as the early nineties saw drum and bass break out from its underground roots and begin to win popularity with the general British public, many producers attempted to expand the influences of the music beyond the domination of ragga-based sounds. By 1995, a counter movement to the ragga style was emerging.

Since the term jungle was so closely related to the ragga influenced sound, DJs and producers who did not incorporate reggae elements began to adopt the term "drum and bass" to differentiate themselves and their musical styles. This reflected a change in the musical style which incorporated increased drum break editing. Sometimes this was referred to as "intelligence", though this later came to refer to the more relaxing style of drum and bass associated with producers such as LTJ Bukem. Perhaps the first track to explicitly use the term "drum and bass" to refer to itself was released in 1993. The producer The Invisible Man described it:

"A well edited Amen Break alongside an 808 sub kick and some simple atmospherics just sounded so amazing all on its own, thus the speech sample "strictly drum and bass". A whole new world of possibilities was opening up for the drum programming... It wasn't long before the amen break was being used by practically every producer within the scene, and as time progressed the Belgian style techno stabs and noises disappeared, and the edits and studio trickery got more and more complex. People were at last beginning to call the music Drum and Bass instead of hardcore. This Amen formula certainly helped cement the sound for many of the tracks I went on to produce for Gwange, Q-Project and Spinback on Legend Records. After a while, tracks using the Amen break virtually had a genre all of their own. Foul Play, Peshay, Bukem, DJ Dextrous, DJ Crystl and Source Direct among others were all solid amen addicts back then too."

Towards late 1994 and especially in 1995 there was a definite distinction between the reggae and ragga sounding jungle and the tracks with heavily edited breaks, such as the artists Remarc, DJ Dextrous and The Dream Team on Suburban Base Records. Ironically, one compilation which brought the term to the wider awareness of those outside the scene, 'Drum & Bass Selection vol 1' (1994), featured a large number of ragga influenced tracks, and the first big track to use the term in its title (Remarc's 'Drum & Bass Wize', 1994) was also ragga-influenced.

The Dream Team consisted of Bizzy B and Pugwash; Bizzy B did however have a history of complex breakbreat tracks released before any real notion of a change in genre name. This also coincided with an increase of the use of the Reese bassline (Reese Project, Kevin Saunderson), as first featured on "Just Want Another Chance" by Kevin Saunderson (also famous for the group Inner City) released in 1988. Mid-1995 saw the coincidentally named Alex Reece's "Pulp Fiction" which featured a distorted Reese bassline with a two-step break, slightly slower in tempo, which has been credited as an influence in the new tech-step style which would emerge from Emotif and No U-Turn Records.

Pulp Fiction was highly original at the time, and has remained a classic oldskool bag for many years. It was also the track that spawned hundreds of imitators of its "2-Step" style which also lasted for many years to come. Because the 2-step groove sounds slower, DnB then began to speed up way beyond 160bpm.

This has also led to the confusion of equating the "tech-step" subgenre with drum and bass, as distinct from jungle, but "drum and bass" as a style and as a name for the whole genre already existed in 1995 before the release of DJ Trace's remix of T-Power's "Mutant Jazz" which appeared on S.O.U.R. Recordings in 1995 (co-produced by Ed Rush and Nico). Also note that DJ Trace, Ed Rush and Nico already had a history of producing jungle/drum & bass and hardcore in a variety of styles.

The media may have also emphasised a difference in styles. This was especially the case in the subgenre dubbed "intelligent" drum and bass by the music press, and its ambassador was LTJ Bukem and his Good Looking label alongside Moving Shadow artists such as Foul Play, Omni Trio and Cloud 9.

Some say that the move to drum and bass was a conscious and concerted reaction by top DJs and producers against a culture that was becoming tinged with gangster types and violent elements, and stereotyped with the recognizable production techniques of ragga-influenced producers. The release of General Levy's "Incredible" record in 1994 is taken by many as being the key-point in the transformation. This ragga influenced track contains a statement by General Levy claiming to be the "original junglist" at a time in which he was proclaiming publicly that "I run jungle" which in turn angered the most powerful and influential drum and bass producers, resulting in a blacklisting of General Levy and possibly a conscious step away from the ragga sound.

"The whole tag jungle took on a real sinister... It just got so smashed in the press. We were like: "If we’re going to carry on we’re gonna have to change the name here, cos we’re getting slaughtered here." - Fabio.

Intelligent drum and bass maintained the uptempo breakbeat percussion, but focused on more atmospheric sounds and warm, deep basslines over vocals or samples which often originated from soul and jazz music. However, alongside other key producers in the scene, LTJ Bukem, arguably the single most influential figure behind the style, is especially noted for disliking the term, owing to the implication that other forms of drum and bass are not intelligent. From this period on, drum and bass would maintain the unity of a relatively small musical culture, but one characterised by a competing group of stylistic influences. Although many DJs have specialised in distinctive subgenres within jungle and drum and bass, the majority of artists within the genre were and remain connected via record labels, events and radio shows. It is extremely important to note that many producers make tracks in more than one subgenre of drum and bass.

Around 1995-1996 there was a general splintering of the drum and bass scene. Subgenres could be referred to by their names as opposed to either jungle or drum and bass, though all subgenres were usually grouped by the new umbrella term drum and bass. This continues today. Roni Size, Krust and Dj Die might be considered the people that made Drum and Bass more mainstream.

Confusion is increased by the term jump-up which initially referred to tracks which had a change in style at the drop, encouraging people to dance. Initially these would usually be breakbeat-heavy drops in this new drum and bass style, but producers of around the same time were creating tracks with hip-hop style basslines at the drop. This would become a new subgenre "jump-up", though many of the early jump-up tracks included edited amens at the drop. Influential artists include DJ Zinc, DJ Hype, Dillinja, Source Direct and Aphrodite amongst many others. The Dream Team would also produce jump-up tracks, usually under the name Dynamic Duo on Joker Records, in a style with similarities and differences to their Suburban Base releases. Notice also the early use of the term "jump up jungle" rather than "jump up drum and bass". The pigeon-holes for genres changed so quickly that jump-up was quickly also called drum and bass even as a subgenre.

Around this time, drum and bass also sealed its popularity by winning a Friday night slot on Radio One, the BBC's flagship radio station, the legendary "One in the jungle" show. Initially presented by a revolving groups of jungle luminaries, hosted by MC Navigator, the station eventually secured the presenting services of Fabio and Grooverider, two of the oldest and most-respected DJs in the scene. Many DJs made a sudden shift from pirate radio to legal radio at this time.

Up to this point, pirate radio was the only radio source of jungle music and in particular Kool FM, and Don FM's contribution to the development of this sound should not be overlooked or denied. It is doubtful whether jungle would have gained popularity without pirate radio stations. The transition in name from "jungle" to "drum and bass" occurs at the same time as its legal appearance on airwaves.

Another aspect to note in the evolution of drum and bass is that the advent of the Criminal Justice and Public Order Act 1994 specifically aimed at stopping illegal raves prompted the move of jungle (and other electronic music genres) into legal (mostly) nightclubs.

=== Jungle vs. drum and bass ===
Nowadays the difference between jungle (or oldschool jungle) and drum and bass is a common debate within the junglist community. There is no universally accepted semantic distinction between the terms "jungle" and "drum and bass". Some associate "jungle" with older material from the first half of the 1990s (sometimes referred to as "jungle techno"), and see drum and bass as essentially succeeding jungle. Others use jungle as a shorthand for ragga jungle, a specific subgenre within the broader realm of drum and bass.

== The birth of techstep ==
As a lighter sound of drum and bass began to win over the musical mainstream, many Producers continued to work on the other end of the spectrum, resulting in a series of releases which highlighted a dark, techy sound which drew more influence from Techno and the soundscapes of science fiction and films. This style was championed by the labels Emotif and No U-Turn, and by artists like Trace, Ed Rush, Optical, and Dom & Roland. It is commonly referred to as techstep, which in turn gave birth to the neurofunk subgenre. Techstep focused intensely on studio production and applied new techniques of sound generation and processing to older Jungle approaches. Self-consciously underground, and lacking the accessible influences of much other drum and bass, techstep is deeply atmospheric, often characterized by sinister or science-fiction themes (including samples from cult films), cold and complex percussion, and dark, distorted basslines. The sound was a conscious move back towards the darker sounds of Belgian Techno and Darkside Hardcore (again the already mentioned darkcore), albeit with a greater electro / techno emphasis than darkcore.

The sound also marked a period when drum and bass became more insular and began to draw inspiration from itself rather than other musical genres. The sampler at this time became less important with home computer equipment and generated beats and sounds becoming capable of creating an entire drum and bass track from scratch.

As the 1990s drew to a close, drum and bass withdrew from mainstream popularity and concentrated on the new more ominous sounds which were popular in clubs, rather than on mainstream radio. Techstep came to dominate the drum and bass genre, with artists like Konflict and Bad Company amongst the most visible. As time went on, techstep became more minimal, and increasingly dark in tone, and the funky, commercial appeal represented by Roni Size back in 1997 waned. A characteristic of this was the increasing disproportion of male to female club goers and a generally more aggressive and dark atmosphere at clubs.

The withdrawal of drum and bass from the mainstream was not only a result of its growing fascination with its own (progressively darker) sound, but also resulted from the explosive birth and growing popularity of UK garage (2 step and 4x4 garage, aka speed garage), a musical genre heavily influenced by jungle, with similar beats, vocal and basslines but slower speeds and more friendly (or at least radio-friendly) beats. Drum and bass suddenly found itself losing popularity and established drum and bass producers expressed shock at its sudden alienation and abandonment by the general public. This turn fuelled the harder sound of techstep.

"And then garage came along: the death knell for drum and Bass. It was the new drum and bass. It was the biggest kick in the teeth for us ever...Yeah! They had all the girls, it was where all the girls from the jungle scene had gone. Drum and bass was at its worst." - Fabio.

Perhaps ironically despite media declarations that "drum and bass/jungle is dead" and killed by garage, drum and bass has survived after a difficult period with the turn of the millennium seeing an increasing movement to "bring the fun back into drum and bass", heralded by the chart success enjoyed by singles from Andy C and Shimon ("Bodyrock") and Shy FX and T Power ("Shake UR Body"). In the clubs there was a new revival of rave-oriented sounds, as well as remixes of classic jungle tracks that capitalised on nostalgia and an interest in the origins of the music. Many felt that drum and bass music had weathered the ignorance, then support, and then hostility, of the mainstream media (which had declared that "drum and bass is dead" in the late 90s), and that the revival of chart success indicated that the style was more than a passing fashion.

In turn, UK garage, after a brief period of extreme popularity, has found itself pushed to the underground and mostly superseded by grime. Drum and bass' survival reflects the tenacity of its original producers and artists who continued and continue to produce drum and bass, as well as the vitality of the new generation of producers, such as London Elektricity and Step 13.

== Since 2000 ==
Since the revival in popularity of the genre in circa 2000, the drum and bass scene has become very diverse, despite its relatively small size, to the point where it is difficult to point to any one subgenre as the dominant style though techstep appears to be losing its previous dominance, with a "return to old skool" movement apparent in tracks & clubs.

In 1998, Fabio began championing a form he called "liquid funk". In 2000 he released a compilation release of the same name on his Creative Source label. This was characterised by influences from disco and house, and widespread use of vocals. Although slow to catch on at first, the style grew massively in popularity around 2002-2004, and by 2004 it was established as one of the biggest-selling subgenres in drum and bass, with labels like Hospital Records, State of the Art Recordings and Soul: R and artists including High Contrast, Calibre, Solid State, Nu:Tone, London Elektricity and Logistics among its main proponents. Alex Reece and LTJ Bukem were amongst the first producers to experiment fully with deep smooth drum and bass, and as such could be considered the forerunners of liquid funk.

The decade also saw the revival of jump-up. Referred to as "nu jump up", or pejoratively as clownstep, this kept the sense of fun and the simplistic, bouncing basslines from the first generation of jump up, but with tougher and more edgy production values, including increased sound compression. Notable artists are DJ Hazard, DJ Clipz and Taxman.

This modern period has also seen the development of the style known as "dubwise", which returns drum and bass to its reggae-influenced roots and combines them with modern production techniques which had advanced immeasurably since the early days of jungle. Although the dub-influenced sound was not new, having long been championed by artists like Digital and Spirit, 2003–2004 saw a significant increase in its popularity and visibility.

Similarly, whilst there had long been a niche dedicated almost entirely to detailed drum programming and manipulation, championed by the likes of Paradox, the first half of this decade saw a revival and expansion in the subgenre known variously as drumfunk, "edits", or "choppage". Major labels include Inperspective and Synaptic Plastic and the new wave of artists in this style include ASC, Fanu, Breakage, Fracture and Neptune, 0=0 and Equinox.

Ravers & Goldie.

The new millennium also saw a fresh wave of live drum and bass bands. The likes of Reprazent and Red Snapper had performed live drum and bass during the 1990s, but the re-creation of London Elektricity as a live band focused renewed interest on the idea, with acts like The Bays, Keiretsu, Southampton based Gojira, Step 13, Deadsilence Syndicate, and U.V Ray (feat. Yuval Gabay) as well as Birmingham's PCM, pursuing this avenue. In addition the popular Breakbeat Kaos label has begun to focus more and more on bringing a live sound into drum and bass, both in the records they release and in the live band (music played on live acoustic instruments, including guitar) night the previously signed group Pendulum have hosted in London (e.g. October 2006 at the Fabric club).

In 2003, Metalheadz signees Dylan and Robyn Chaos (aka Faith In Chaos) pushed the harder sound of drum and bass by founding the Freak Recordings label and sublabels Obscene and Tech Freak, together with artists like Technical Itch, Limewax, Counterstrike, SPL, Current Value, and many others, leading to the creation of the Therapy Sessions drum and bass festivals in London. The Therapy Sessions franchise quickly expanded worldwide with greater repercussion on Eastern Europe with an attendance of more than 10.000 fans in cities like St. Petersburg.

Near the late 2000s, a genre known referred to as minimal drum & bass, also known as "autonomic" or "microfunk", emerged. This subgenre is identified primarily by its overall minimalistic song structure as well as its use of intricate percussion, deep sub-bass and subdued melodies. Notable artists include ASC, Consequence, dBridge, Instra:mental, Synkro, Oak and Bop (among many others). With popular labels that promote the sound being Exit Records (Owned by dBridge himself), Med School, Critical Music, Shogun Audio, Nonplus+ Records (Also Co-owned between dBridge and Instra:mental), Auxiliary (Owned by ASC) as well as the record label Autonomic. "The Autonomic Podcast" is a podcast that is released for free by those in Club Autonomic. 'Minimal' drum & bass has crossed over into a more dance-floor oriented sound through artists like Rockwell, Enei and Icicle who take inspiration from genres including neurofunk and industrial techno.

A new darker sub-genre dubbed “rollers” popular artists like Serum, Benny L, Bou, Voltage and Bladerunner. Popularity risen around 2016 with deep rolling basslines and often associated with the foghorn sound.

== Drum 'n' bass and jazz fusion ==
American Grammy Award-winning record producer, jazz fusion pioneer, and bassist Bill Laswell touched on drum and bass in the ‘90s with his Oscillations releases and the compilation Submerged: Tetragramaton. Laswell stepped up his work in drum 'n' bass starting with Brutal Calling (2004), an eight-track hard drum 'n' bass album with Ohm Resistance label owner Submerged followed by a series of releases and live dates. Laswell’s newest project in this vein is Method of Defiance. The first release focused on the core of Laswell and Submerged once again, with contributions from Toshinori Kondo and Guy Licata.

The second release under the Method of Defiance moniker was a compilation style project focusing on drum 'n' bass. Inamorata stretched the concept out, pairing Laswell’s bass with a different combination of respected jazz and world musicians and drum 'n' bass producers on each track. Artists including Herbie Hancock, John Zorn, Pharoah Sanders, Nils Petter Molvaer, Toshinori Kondo and Buckethead were paired with drum 'n' bass producers including Amit, Paradox, Submerged, Evol Intent, Fanu and Corrupt Souls. He also released a full-on collaboration with Finnish drum 'n' bass maestro Fanu on Ohm Resistance (US) and Karl Records (Europe), entitled Lodge, which includes contributions from Molvaer and Bernie Worrell amongst others. The concept of the group has once again morphed into a full band concept. In 2009, RareNoiseRecords released Live in Nihon, which showcased this new direction/grouping. The group now consisted of Laswell, Guy Licata, Dr. Israel, Toshinori Kondo and Bernie Worrell.

== North America ==
In 1989, DJ DB (DB Burkeman), originally a British native, moved to New York City to become one of the pioneers of the North American jungle/drum and bass movement. DJ DB co-founded Breakbeat Science with DJ Dara and this record label is credited for involving, if not signing, nearly every major early adapter to U.S. D&B including artists such as AK1200 and Aphrodite, Dieselboy, High Contrast, London Elektricity along with Klute. The Breakbeat Science record shop opened in New York City, becoming the first record shop exclusively dedicated to Jungle, Drum-N-Bass, and Breakbeat music. DJ DB is an early pioneer in rave culture in America and is widely credited as being partly responsible for bringing drum and bass to America. The rave scenes in Canada and the United States embraced the transition from Breakbeat to Drum and bass around 1994. DJ DB, MC Blaise (featured on the Datcyde song “Naughty Ride”), DJ Dieselboy, DJ Michele Sainte, DJ and Producer Method One, and Producer 1.8.7 were some of the first American artists in the genre. This small handful of DJs, MCs, and Producers spent years in the underground performing in back rooms at raves before the genre caught on throughout America.

Perhaps most responsible for the extensive introduction of drum and bass to the U.S. during the mid-1990s was Bassquake, a prime time Drum And Bass radio programme created by DJ Michele Sainte. It aired each Friday afternoon into the evening on 103.3FM WPRB which is a commercial radio station at Princeton University in Princeton, New Jersey with audiences in both New York and Philadelphia. Also partly responsible was Bassrush, headed by Raymond Frances, presenting House, Techno, and Drum & Bass in separate rooms—making Drum & Bass, for the first time, a major feature at American raves.

In the Americas, there are a wide range of long-standing collectives and event producers who have been strongly dedicated to Drum & Bass. One such entity is Respect Drum & Bass in Los Angeles. In 1994, the Koncrete Jungle drum and bass events were started. Other regular jungle and drum and bass focused events were produced by Torque Drum & Bass out of Orlando Florida, who started doing exclusively Jungle and drum and bass events in 1999. Many of these event producers are still active today in America and frequently host prominent names in the history of jungle and drum and bass music while working to elevate the genre.

In 2002, the world was introduced to drum and bass music on a wider scale with the creation of Insomniac Events's Bassrush brand, which is dedicated to the drum and bass genre. Bassrush brought drum and bass music to the mainstream when Insomniac featured its own Bassrush Stage at Electric Daisy Carnival. Out of Denver Colorado a collective by the name of Recon DNB was established in 2003 and has been recognized for their lineups of drum and bass legends over the years. With many new drum and bass focused events, festivals, and nightclubs popping up each year, the ever-increasing popularity of jungle and drum and bass music in the United States has allowed for predominately house and techno venues, among others, to begin welcoming more drum and bass events in their establishments in recent years further aiding in the boost in popularity.

== South America ==
Brazil's fusion of Drum & Bass and Bossa Nova or Samba gave birth to the term Sambass which was pushed by DJ Marky together with DJ Patife, XRS and Drumagick, and shortly after the sound conquered the UK scene due to the global popularity that Marky achieved, supported by a residency at The End club and his work for BBC Radio 1. In Venezuela, DJ Alex (Venezuela's first Drum & Bass DJ and founder of the Simpl3 crew), also known as Modovisual for his graphic design, has created several designs for international events and also merchandising for Dogsonacid.com. Venezuelan producer and DJ Zardonic has been leading the harder sound of Drum & Bass by headlining the first Therapy Sessions events taking place in Ecuador and Argentina, as well as pushing the country even further on the map due to his signing to Dieselboy's Human Imprint label.

== Literature ==
- All Crews: Journeys Through Jungle / Drum and Bass Culture by Brian Belle-Fortune (ISBN 978-0-9548897-0-8), nonfiction
- Knowledge Magazine Article on the history of drum & bass radio pirates by Sarah Bentley
- Roots 'n Future by Simon Reynolds (ISBN 978-0-330-35056-3), nonfiction
- Rumble in the Jungle: The Invisible History of Drum and Bass by Steven Quinn, Transformations, No 3 (2002), nonfiction (ISSN 1444-3775) PDF file
- State of bass, jungle: the story so far by Martin James, Boxtree (ISBN 978-0-7522-2323-0), nonfiction
- The Rough Guide to Drum 'n' Bass by Peter Shapiro and Alexix Maryon (ISBN 978-1-85828-433-0), nonfiction
- King Rat by China Melville (ISBN 978-0-330-37098-1), fiction
