= Photek discography =

This is the discography for British electronic musician Photek.

== Albums ==
- Modus Operandi (Science / Virgin, 1997)
- Form & Function (Science / Virgin, 1998)
- Solaris (Science / Virgin, 2000)
- Form & Function Vol. 2 (Sanctuary Records, 2007)
- KU:PALM (Photek Productions, 2012)

== Singles and EPs ==
- Natural Born Killa EP (Metalheadz (1994))
- "The Seven Samurai / Complex" (Photek Productions, 1995)
- "UFO / Rings Around Saturn" (Photek Productions, 1995)
- "Ni – Ten – Ichi – Ryu" aka "二天 一流" (Science / Virgin, 1995)
- "The Rain (Remixes)" (Razors Edge, 1996)
- "T-Raenon" (Op-Art, 1996)
- "The Hidden Camera" (Science / Virgin, 1996)
- "The Third Sequence" (Astralwerks, 1996)
- "Terminus" (Science / Virgin, 2000)
- "Mine to Give" (Science / Virgin, 2000)
- "Glamourama" 12" (Science, Virgin, 2000)
- "No Joke" (Photek Productions, 2004)
- "Collision Course" (Full Cycle Records, 2004)
- "Mercury" (Photek Productions, 2005)
- "Sidewinder (Remixes)" (Photek Productions, 2005)
- "Love & War" (Sanctuary Records, 2007)
- Avalanche EP (Photek Productions, 2011)
- Aviator EP (Photek Productions, 2011)
- "Closer" (Tectonic (2011))
- "Acid Reign" / "M25FM" (Photek Productions, 2012) – a collaborative release between Photek & Pinch
- "One" (Photek Productions, 2012)
- "Two" (Photek Productions, 2012)

== Remixes ==
- Goldie – "Inner City Life" (FFRR)
- London Elektricity – "Different Drum" (Hospital Records)
- Attica Blues – "Blueprint" (Mo Wax)
- Therapy? – "Loose" (A&M Records)
- Björk – "I Miss You" (One Little Indian)
- Dr. Octagon – "Blue Flowers" (Mo Wax)
- Everything but the Girl – "Single" (Virgin)
- E-Z Rollers – "Rolled Into 1" (Moving Shadow)
- Jonny L – "2 of Us" (XL Recordings)
- David Bowie – "I'm Afraid of Americans" (Virgin Records)
- Roni Size & Reprazent – "Brown Paper Bag" (Talkin' Loud)
- 4 Hero – "Star Chasers" (Talkin' Loud)
- Goldie – "Believe" (FFRR)
- Lamb – "Alien" (Fontana)
- Zero 7 – "Destiny" (Ultimate Dilemma)
- Jakatta – "So Lonely" (Planetworks)
- Six Feet Under: Music from the HBO Original Series – "Theme Tune" (Universal)
- Beth Orton – "Anywhere" (Heavenly)
- James Zabiela – "Sound in Motion" (Hooj Choons)
- The Faint – "Total Job" (Astralwerks)
- Tubby T – "Ready She Ready" (51st State)
- Gwen Stefani – "Cool" (Interscope)
- Nine Inch Nails – "The Hand That Feeds" (East Records)
- Birdy – "Shelter" (Atlantic)
- Moby – "Lie Down in Darkness" (Little Idiot)
- Distance – "Falling" (Universal)
- Jess Mills – "Vultures" (Island)
- Daft Punk – "End of Line" (Walt Disney)
- Karin Park – "Tiger Dreams" (State of the Eye)
- Chairlift – "I Belong in Your Arms" (Young Turks)
- Rob Zombie – "Living Dead Girl" (Geffen)
- Lana Del Rey – "Ride" (Universal Music)
- Bob Marley & the Wailers – "One Love/People Get Ready" (Island)
- Warren G featuring Nate Dogg – "Regulate" Photek remix (Def Jam)
- James Newton Howard – "Signs" (Hollywood Records)
- Zella Day – "Hypnotic" (Universal Music Group North America)
- Rodrigo y Gabriela – "The Pirate That Shouldn't Be" (Walt Disney)
