= Logical Progression =

Compilation album by LTJ Bukem
- Released: 1996
- Genres: Jungle, drum and bass
- Label: Good Looking/ffrr
- Producers: LTJ Bukem, various

LTJ Bukem chronology
Mixmag Live! (1996)	Logical Progression (1996)	Promised Land Volume One (1996)

Logical Progression (also known as LTJ Bukem Presents Logical Progression) is a compilation album spearheaded by the English musician and label head LTJ Bukem, released in 1996. It includes tracks by Bukem and artists who recorded for his label, Good Looking Records, as well as his remixes.

The compilation was a commercial success. (The New) Rolling Stone Album Guide called it "a landmark drum-and-bass album," and, along with Goldie's Timeless, "perhaps one of the two most important drum-and-bass releases of the decade."

Bukem promoted the album in the United States by playing the Enit Festival.

== Critical reception ==
Professional ratings
Review scores
Source	Rating
AllMusic	5/5 stars
Chicago Tribune	3/4 stars
The Encyclopedia of Popular Music	4/5 stars
MusicHound Rock: The Essential Album Guide	3.5/5 stars
Muzik	5/5 stars
The Philadelphia Inquirer	3.5/4 stars
(The New) Rolling Stone Album Guide	4/5 stars

Eric Weisbard, writing in Spin, called the compilation "the most rhythmically rich drum'n'bass compilation I've heard, whir-whizz shimmer that's less reggae than other jungle, an uncut slice of British trendiness." Rolling Stone wrote: "While Bukem's dense tunes fare slightly better than the anesthetized soundscapes that fill most of Logical Progression, it is tracks like Photek's spooky, claustrophobic 'Pharoah' (which sounds like 'Riders on the Storm' meets 'Cold Sweat' at high speed) and Aquarius and Tayla's oceanic 'Bringing Me Down' that provide the real sustenance."

Newsday determined that "Bukem's songs 'Demon's Theme', 'Music' and 'Horizons' are like signature tunes from another galaxy, but his mix CD, replete with surface noise from the original vinyl, is doomed to attract that most damning of indictments from the uninitiated: that it all sounds the same." The Chicago Tribune concluded that Bukem "charts new territory by orchestrating a psychedelic urban symphony incorporating trance's slow Middle Eastern tonalities, jungle's industrialized West Indian drum roll and a lyrically experimental hip-hop." The Independent deemed the album a "spring-heeled, summer's-coming drum'n'bass selection."

AllMusic wrote that "the house influences and steady rhythms make Logical Progression perhaps the best introduction to jungle for those not used to hyper-speed breakbeats." MusicHound Rock: The Essential Album Guide noted that "Demon's Theme" is "considered a classic."

== Track listing ==
Disc one
No.	Title	Artist	Length
1.	"Demon's Theme"	LTJ Bukem
2.	"Links"	Chameleon
3.	"Music"	LTJ Bukem
4.	"One & Only"	PFM
5.	"Bringing Me Down"	Aquarius & Tayla
6.	"Danny's Song"	PFM
7.	"Vocal Tune"	Peshay
8.	"Coolin' Out"	LTJ Bukem
9.	"Western (Remix)"	PFM/Conrad
10.	"Horizons"	LTJ Bukem

Disc two
No.	Title	Artist	Length
1.	"Airtight (Remix)"	Funky Technicians
2.	"New Element"	Form Form
3.	"Drums in a Grip"	F. De Wolf/Wax Doctor
4.	"Solutions"	Ils & Solo
5.	"In Too Deep"	JMJ & Flytronix
6.	"So Long"	Seba & Lo-Tec
7.	"Pharaoh"	Photek
8.	"Miles High"	DJ Trace
9.	"Groove Therapy"	Universal
10.	"Mind Games"	DJ Crystl
