= Call and response (disambiguation) =

Call and response is a form of communication.

Call and response may also refer to:

== Literature ==
- Call and Response: The Riverside Anthology of the African American Literary Tradition, a literature anthology
- Call and Response, a novel by T. R. Pearson

== Music ==
- Call and response (music), a type of musical phrasing or structure
- "Call-response" or Coro-pregón, a genre of music
- Call and Response: The Remix Album (2008), an album by Maroon 5
- A Call and Response (2006), an album by The Longcut
- "Call & Response", a song from Controlled Developments (1997) by Source Direct
- Call and Response (2002), an album by Bangs

== Other uses ==
- Call + Response, a 2008 documentary about the human slave trade
- Call and response (liturgy) in Christian liturgies
- Countersign (military), a form of call and response to gain entry to a secure area
