= Makoto (musician) =

Japanese musical artist

Makoto Shimizu
- Birth name: Makoto Shimizu (清水真, Shimizu Makoto)
- Also known as: Makoto (マコト, Makoto)
- Born: 1977 (age 47–48) Tokyo, Japan
- Genres: Drum and bass, jazz, funk, soul, house
- Occupation(s): Musician, record producer, DJ
- Years active: 1996–present
- Labels: Human Elements, HE:Digital, Good Looking, Innerground, Bingo, Hospital

Makoto Shimizu (清水誠, Shimizu Makoto) (born 1977 in Tokyo, Japan), professionally known as Makoto (マコト, Makoto), is a Japanese drum and bass musician, producer and DJ. Among other distinctive elements of Makoto's musical style, a heavy influence of 1970s-era soul, funk and jazz fusion can be heard throughout the vast majority of his repertoire.

== Career ==
Inspired by LTJ Bukem's Logical Progression album and Goldie's Timeless, he began to experiment with his own drum and bass music compositions. His unique style received the attention of LTJ Bukem and his Good Looking Records label, and Makoto was later featured on several of Bukem's mix CDs.

Makoto's first studio album, Human Elements, was released on Good Looking Records in 2003. His second studio album, Believe in My Soul, was released on the same label in 2007. He also recorded a live album with frequent touring partner MC Deeizm for the label's Progression Sessions series of live mixes.

Makoto's album Souled Out was released in Japan on 5 October 2011 and worldwide on 10 October 2011 by Makoto's physical label Human Elements and on his digital download-only label HE:Digital.

Makoto continues to tour in support of his music, mostly in Japan, but also across Asia, Europe, and the US.

His music is also featured in Polyphony's Gran Turismo series and its spinoff, Tourist Trophy.

In 2021, he was featured on the soundtrack of Forza Horizon 5 with the songs "Trial Mountain" and "Another Star".

== Discography ==
=== Albums ===
==== Studio albums ====
- 2003: Human Elements (Good Looking Records)
- 2007: Believe in My Soul (Good Looking Records)
- 2011: Souled Out (Human Elements)
- 2015: Aquarian Dreams (Eastern Elements)
- 2017: Salvation (Hospital Records)
- 2019: Tomodachi Sessions (Hospital Records)
- 2022: Motion of Change (Hospital Records)

==== Selected compilation albums ====
- 2000: Progression Sessions 5 - LTJ Bukem featuring MC Conrad & DRS / Makoto
- 2011: Something We Can Do

=== Selected singles and EPs ===
- 1998: "Down Angel / EchoVox" (Positive Machine Soul mix)
- 1998: "Wave / Jupiters Field"
- 1999: "Enterprise / Sweet Changes"
- 1999: "Far East / Butterfly"
- 2000: Situations EP
- 2001: "ラストシーン / You're Divine" - Takkyu Ishino feat. Tabito Nanao / Makoto feat. Lori Fine
- 2001: "Mysteries / Trapezoid / Blackberry Jam / Voices" - Cascade, JLaze, Makoto (2 x 12")
- 2001: "You're Divine"
- 2001: "Blackberry Jam / Voices"
- 2002: Musical Message EP
- 2003: "My Soul"
- 2003: "Time 2003"
- 2004: "Sublime Intervention / What to Do" - Laroque, Makoto
- 2004: Joy EP Plate 1
- 2005: "Golden Girl" - MC Conrad & Makoto
- 2007: "Tearing Soul / Lovesong" - Sonic & Makoto
- 2007: "Pleasure / Science Fiction" - Greg Packer & Makoto
- 2007: "Pachinko / A Different Story" - Makoto & Specialist
- 2007: "Hurinkazan"
- 2007: "Eastern Dub Pt. 2"
- 2008: "Fade Away / Monotonik" - Zinc & Makoto / Makoto & Deeizm
- 2009: "Music in Me" (Greg Packer remix) / Kat Magnit" - Makato, Greg Packer & Muller
- 2009: "Chameleon" - Nik Weston presents Makoto & Kez Ym feat. Takumi Kaneko from Cro Magnon
- 2009: "Spacetrain / The Final Fugutive" - A Sides & Makoto
- 2009: "Sentimental Moods / And I Love Her"
- 2011: "Tower of Love / Keep Me Down"
- 2011: "Aquarius / Good Old Days" - DJ Marky & Makoto
- 2012: "Another Generation"
- 2016: "YGMYC"
- 2016: "Sunshine / Midnight Hour" - Danny Wheeler & Makoto
- 2020: "Cold Expanse" - Artificial Intelligence & Makoto
- 2021: "Spread Love" (feat. Pete Simpson) / "Contact"
- 2021: "What You Need"
