= Blame (music producer) =

- Birth name: Conrad Shafie
- Origin: England
- Genres: Drum and bass, breakbeat hardcore, jungle, jazz
- Occupation(s): Disc jockey, musician, music producer, songwriter
- Instruments: Keyboards, synthesizer
- Years active: 1991–present
- Labels: Moving Shadow, Metalheadz, Hospital Records, Charge Recordings, New State Music, Good Looking Records, 720 Degrees, V Recordings, Champion Records (UK), Over/Shadow, Violet Nights Recordings

Conrad Shafie, better known mononymously as Blame, is an English DJ, musician, music producer, and songwriter. He is considered one of the pioneers of the drum and bass genre. Some of Blame's singles appeared on the UK Singles Chart between 1992 and 2004.

== Career ==
Blame grew up listening to electro and hip hop music. Whilst in school, Blame was exposed to House music from Europe and the United States and was inspired to combine hip hop breakbeats with House sounds. He then hired a community recording studio in Luton called the 33 Arts Centre to work on his own music and the resulting track was "Music Takes You", which ended up being signed to the Moving Shadow record label in 1991 while he was still a teenager. Moving Shadow also released Blame's singles "Feel The Energy", "Are You Dreaming", and "Neptune".

Several of Blame's releases, including "Neptune", were heard at Fabio (DJ)'s Speed nightclub in London. Good Looking Records then offered Blame a record contract. Blame went on to mix the Logical Progression 2 and Progression Sessions 2 compilations for Good Looking Records. He also embarked on a worldwide DJ tour with LTJ Bukem. Singles from his time on Good Looking Records include "Visions Of Mars", "360 Clic", "Alpha:7", "Revival", "J-Walkin’" and "Centuries".

In 1997, Blame launched 720 Degrees, a Drum and bass label that fused atmospheric and futuristic sci-fi sounds with Techno inspired effects and synth sounds. Two Revolutions was his first DJ mix compilation album released on the label.

In 2000 or so, Blame left Good Looking Records to release work on other labels in the Drum and Bass genre including Metalheadz, Charge Recordings, and Hospital Records, along with his own newly launched independent version of his 720 Degrees imprint.

In 2008, Blame released "Stay Forever", which aired on BBC Radio 1 and was on the daytime playlist of BBC Radio 1Xtra. His follow up single, "Because of You", was released, featuring a vocal performance by Selah. It became the BBC Radio 1 Single of the Week on 2 February 2009, Zane Lowe’s Hottest Record in the World, as well as being aired on daytime Radio 1.

Blame entered into a recording contract with Newstate Music in 2010, which resulted in the release of The Music, an album which featured vocal collaborations with Selah, Tinchy Stryder, Fuda Guy, Jocelyn Brown, Dynamite MC, Rodney P, DRS, Jenna G, Alex Mills, JT Fitz, Camilla Marie and Tom Sears. He then went on to remix the David Guetta and Kelly Rowland single "When Love Takes Over", the Robin S dance classic "Show Me Love", Raze's iconic "Break 4 Love", Sway's – "Level Up", Skepta's – "Make Peace Not War", and Michael Jackson's "I Want You Back".

In 2018, Blame formed a group called the Social Misfits alongside DJ Concrete. V Recordings signed the project. Annie Mac, DJ Target, and Rene LaVice played songs from the release on BBC Radio 1 and BBC Radio 1Xtra.

In May 2020, Blame's remix of "Step Tune" by T.R.A.C featuring Random Movement and Adrienne Richards was released on V Recordings.

In late 2020, Blame's "Lift Off" and "Star Traveller" were released on the newly formed Over/Shadow record label. The very first pressings were on a limited edition marbled vinyl.

In February 2021, Blame announced that Violet Nights Recordings will begin releasing many of his previously unreleased dubplates. The label's first 12" release, Blame's "Understanding & Knowing" and "In My Soul", was released on 5 March 2021 on both black and violet vinyl.

== Selected discography ==
=== Albums ===
- Into The Void (Good Looking Records, 2002)
- The Turning Point (720 Degrees, 2006)
- The Music (New State Music, 2010)

=== EPs and singles ===
- "Music Takes You" (Moving Shadow, 1991) – #48 in UK, 1992 (Note: On UK Singles Chart, this was mis-labeled as "Music Moves You")
  - "Music Takes You" (2 Bad Mice, John B remixes) (Moving Shadow, 2002) – No. 79 in UK
- "Feel The Energy" (Moving Shadow, 1993)
- "Between Worlds" (EP) (Good Looking Records, 1998) (Wax Magazine's "Single Of The Month" for September 1998)
- "Sleepwalker / Reptile" (with Mampi Swift) (Charge, 2004) – No. 82 in UK

=== Mixes as DJ ===
- Blame – Live @ Turnmills for Wax Magazine (DJ set), 1997
- Blame – Logical Progression Level 2 (DJ mix), GLR, 1997
- Blame Featuring DRS – Progression Sessions Two, GLR, 1998
- Blame's Two Revolutions (compilation, DJ mix, double CD), 720 Degrees, 1999
- Blame – KMag Presents... The 100th Issue Selection (CD, compilation, DJ mix) for Knowledge Magazine

== Extended Discography ==
=== Albums ===
- Live @ Turnmills (DJ set for Wax Magazine, 1997)
- Logical Progression Level 2 (DJ mix) (Good Looking Records, 1997)
- Blame Featuring DRS – Progression Sessions Two (Good Looking Records, 1998)
- Two Revolutions (compilation, DJ mix, double CD) (720 Degrees, 1999)
- KMag Presents... The 100th Issue Selection (CD, compilation, DJ mix) for Knowledge Magazine
- Into The Void (GLR, 2002)
- The Turning Point (720 Degrees, 2006)
- The Music (New State Music, 2010)

=== EPs and Singles ===
- Music Takes You (Moving Shadow, 1991) (charted at # 48 in the UK, 1992)
- Feel The Energy (Moving Shadow, 1993)
- A21 / Sikological Hostage (Moving Shadow, 1993)
- Sub Committee (Moving Shadow, 1994)
- Heritage / Retrospect (Moving Shadow, 1996)
- Neptune / Planet Neptune (Moving Shadow, 1996)
- (with Deep Blue) Transitions / Re-Transitions (Moving Shadow, 1996)
- Visions Of Mars / Centuries (Good Looking Records, 1996)
- 360° Clic / Overhead Projections (Good Looking Records, 1997)
- (with Odyssey) Artificial Life / J-Walkin' (720 Degrees, 1997)
- (with Deep Blue) Transitions (Dom & Roland Remix) / De-Transitions 10" (Moving Shadow, 1997)
- Cuban Lynx / Solitude (720 Degrees, 1997)
- (with Appaloosa & DJ Dream) 360° Clic / Overhead Projections / Night Train / Chord Data (Good Looking Records, 1997)
- Alpha:7 on Logical Progression, Level 3 (Good Looking Records, 1998)
- Between Worlds (Good Looking Records, 1998)
- (with Seba (musician)} Sphere (Seba Remix) / Predator (Secret Operations, 1998)
- Con / Con Dub (Secret Operations, 1998)
- (with Blu Mar Ten) Sphere / B.R.O. (1999)
- (with Artemis) – Revival / Silver Dawn (Earth, 2000)
- Firestorm EP (Good Looking Records, 2001)
- Sigma EP (GLR, 2001)
- as Dragonsword – Centre of the System / Plasma Eyes (720 Degrees, 2002)
- Right Thru You / Rattlesnake (720 Degrees, 2003)
- Asylum EP (720 Degrees, 2003)
- The One / From This Planet (720 Degrees, 2003)
- 720 Revolution LP Sampler (Part Two) (720 Degrees, 2004)
- Judas / Bakura (Part Two) (720 Degrees, 2004)
- Medusa / Burnout (Metalheadz, 2004)
- (with Mampi Swift) – The Rainman EP (Charge Recordings, 2004)
- Closer / Citadel (720 Degrees, 2004)
- 720 Revolution LP Sampler Part 1 (720 Degrees, 2004)
- (with Mampi Swift) Sleepwalker / Reptile (Charge Recordings, 2004)
- Desert Planet / Cyberun (720 Degrees, 2004)
- Diablo / Indestructable (720 Degrees, 2005)
- Red Alert / Alien Fire (720 Degrees, 2005)
- Rise of the Machines (Charge Recordings, 2005)
- Shadows Of Technology / Alpha Quadrant (720 Degrees, 2005)
- The Search / Land Speed (Metalheadz, 2005)
- Artificial Environment / Wavelength (Moving Shadow, 2006)
- Tyrant / Prophecy (Charge Recordings, 2006)
- Take Me Away / Livewire (720 Degrees, 2006)
- Thunder Run / Beholder (720 Degrees, 2006)
- (vs. ASC & Aaron Myers) Amethyst / The Labyrinth (TestFlight Recordings, 2007)
- Skyline VIP / The Bionic Man (720 Degrees, 2007)
- Solar Burn / Solar Burn VIP (Charge Recordings, 2007)
- Guardian Angel / Enduro (720 Degrees, 2007)
- (with The Pedge & Apex Featuring Ayah) – Weapons Of Mass Creation 3 Sampler (Hospital Records, 2007)
- Keep The Sunshine / Flashback (720 Degrees, 2008)
- Stay Forever / Strikeforce (Charge Recordings, 2008)
- Hold The Sunshine / Panic Stations (720 Degrees, 2008)
- Hiro / Apocalypto (Blame Music, 2008)
- Batcave / Harlem (Charge Recordings, 2008)
- Out There / Rush (Charge Recordings, 2007)
- Because Of You Featuring Selah (720 Degrees, 2009)
- (Featuring Ruff Sqwad) – On My Own (New State Music, 2010)
- (Featuring Fuda Guy & Camilla Marie) – Star (New State Music, 2010)
- (Featuring Jocelyn Brown) – Set Me Free (New State Music, 2011)
- (with Dom & Roland, Rob Playford, and Goldie) – The Shadow (Hive Vip) / Music Takes You (John B Remix) (Scrunch Recordings)
- Point 4 (Remix) / Elevations (acetate \ dubplate)
- Step Tune (Blame's remix) by T.R.A.C featuring Random Movement and Adrienne Richards (V Recordings, 2020)
- Get Loose (Blame's remix) by Mr & Mrs Smith (Champion Records (UK), 2020)
