= Micky Finn (DJ) =

- Born: Michael Hearn; Woolwich, London
- Genres: Drum and bass, jungle, breakbeat hardcore
- Occupations: DJ, producer
- Years active: 1990–present
- Labels: Fokus Music, Fantazia, Urban Takeover, Finn People
- Website: djmickyfinn.com

Michael Hearn, better known by his stage name Micky Finn, is a British jungle and drum and bass DJ/producer, promoter, and founder or co-owner of multiple record labels.

Finn has been described as 'Legendary', and is known as one of the original rave scene, breakbeat hardcore, and jungle pioneers. Finn has been called the "Godfather of jungle and drum & bass", and "a British music institution".

== Career ==
=== Early years ===
Finn would go to blues parties as a youngster, but credits hip-hop as being his main inspiration for getting into music; he has said that after discovering Eric B. & Rakim, music became "like an obsession", and he began collecting and mixing music at home. Finn started DJing in public, and "one party led to another" until his first paid gig at the Tunnel Club in London.

=== Illegal Rave Scene ===
Although Finn was widely known to DJ at illegal raves for some time during the 80s, the nature of these events makes documenting them retrospectively very difficult. Finn is known to have DJed at the "legendary" Genesis and Biology raves multiple times, but like many others became disillusioned with "driving round the country to a thing that had been stopped, and then getting into fights with the police". However, in 1990, after the UK enacted the Entertainments (Increased Penalties) Act 1990, many rave promoters had no choice to apply for licenses or face steep penalties. That year, Finn DJed at, and was listed on the flyer for what is believed to be first ever "legal rave", an event called Amnesia House in Coventry. After this point, Finn started appearing on flyers all over the rave scene, playing hardcore across the UK, but particularly in the Midlands, where such gigs began to develop into the UK Junglist sound.

=== Recording and Partnership with Aphrodite ===
In 1991, UK based record label Fokus Recordings released Finn's first tune: She's Breaking Up (also sometimes known as Bionic Man), under the name Bitin' Back.

Later in 1991, Finn partnered with Gavin King and Claudio Giussani to release Some Justice by Urban Shakedown (featuring Micky Finn), distributed by Warner Music UK. Urban Shakedown used twin Commodore Amiga A500s and sampled beats directly from vinyl using a Technosound sampler cartridge and Audiomaster II software. They would then sequence the samples using Med 3.0, to achieve a total of 8 tracks. They preferred to use 2 Amigas instead of running the newer "Octamed" software because Octamed used sample compression to achieve 8 track sequencing, which reduced sound quality. This combination gave the cutting-edge bedroom producers a professional sheen that allowed them to release high quality music, that compared with more professional studio setups; this resulted in BBC Radio One describing the group as having "one of the most innovative sounds around".

After a successful club run, Some Justice was re-pressed in 1992 with the AA-Side of Summer Break, and 2 remixes. This re-release became a top 40 hit, charting for five weeks and peaking at number 23 in the UK charts; it was named the second ever "single of the week" in the 7th July 1992 issue of long-running British music magazine Melody Maker (In addition, the first ever single of the week was 'Basket Case', by Eon, which featured an Urban Shakedown remix on its B-side). The record was then picked up by PWL and re-released again for international distribution. In The Guardian's retrospective list of "The greatest hardcore rave tracks", they placed Some Justice 9th, describing it as "one of hardcore’s most glorious hands-in-the-air breakdowns, surrounded by explosive breakbeats and weirdly ominous synth stabs"

Later in 1992, the trio partnered up again to release Bass Shake, which reached number 59 in the charts. This was the start of a long-running partnership with King, and the duo later co-founded the Urban Takeover music label together.

In 1993, Finn appeared on the first ever DJ Mag list of "100 Best DJs in the world", receiving a full-page break-out article (compared to most other DJs, who just got a paragraph or two). At that time, DJ Mag described Finn as "a cult figure who can sell out the biggest nights just on the strength of the promise of their presence".

In 1996 Finn and King (as Urban Takeover) released the seminal track Bad Ass!, which quickly became a club staple and is regarded as a 'legendary jump-up anthem' and is still played in clubs today. Bad Ass! "featured on not only every top earning DJ’s sets during 1995. but has since graced many top 40 chart compilations". Bad Ass! has since received at least 10 re-pressings, and countless remixes, with the most recent re-release being in 2018. Bad Ass! was featured on BBC Radio 6 "Steve Lamacq's Drum and Bass World Cup".

The success of Bad Ass! led to Luniz releasing an Urban Takeover remix of I Got 5 on It as an official standalone release on Virgin Records in 1998, using an early dubplate version of the remix track as a B-Side.

In 2013, DJ Mag listed both Bad Ass, as well as the Urban Takeover remix of Blackstreet's No Diggity in their "100 Most Important Drum and Bass Tracks of All Time"

=== Other ventures ===
As of 2022, Finn also runs the Finn People music label, and is one of the co-founders of the Sunbeatz Drum and Bass festival in Ibiza, and the Heatwave festival in Mallorca.

== Personal life ==
Micky Finn has a daughter, and a son, Logan D, who is also a Jump Up Drum and Bass DJ.
