= KJZ =

KJZ or kjz may refer to:

- "KJZ", a 1997 song by Photek from their album Modus Operandi
- kjz, the ISO 639-3 code for Bumthang language, Bhutan
