= Journey Inwards =

Studio album by LTJ Bukem
- Released: 12 April 2000
- Genre: Drum and bass; jungle
- Length: 95:41
- Label: Good Looking Records
- Producer: D. Williamson

LTJ Bukem chronology
Mystical Realms (1998)	Journey Inwards (2000)	Suspended Space (2000)

Singles from Journey Inwards
- 1. "Rhodes to Freedom" / "Watercolours" Released: 1999; 2. "Sunrain" Released: 2000

Journey Inwards is the first studio album by British drum and bass artist LTJ Bukem. It was released on Bukem's own record label, Good Looking Records, in 2000. It peaked at number 40 on the UK Albums Chart.

== Critical reception ==
Professional ratings
Review scores
Source	Rating
AllMusic	4.5/5 stars
Exclaim!	favorable
Pitchfork	3.9/10
The New Rolling Stone Album Guide	3/5 stars

John Bush of AllMusic said, "Taken as a whole, Journey Inwards is an album of pure brilliance, a work that trumps many of Bukem's past productions, and signals, for what may be the first time, that his production talents are actually growing and developing. " Prasad Bidaye of Exclaim! described the album as "a simple but sophisticated expression of warmth, optimistic, and still danceable, sensibilities."

== Track listing ==
All tracks are written by D. Williamson, except where noted

Disc A
No.	Title	Writer(s)	Length
1.	"Journey Inwards"		7:05
2.	"Watercolours"		7:38
3.	"Rhodes to Freedom"		9:09
4.	"Our World"		5:06
5.	"Undress Your Mind"	D. Williamson; K. Tatham	7:44
6.	"Point of View"		3:09
7.	"View Point"		8:04
Total length:			47:55

Disc B
No.	Title	Writer(s)	Length
1.	"Sunrain"	D. Williamson; Elliot	7:27
2.	"Deserted Vaults (Instrumental)"		4:25
3.	"Inner Guidance"		5:16
4.	"Close to the Source"		7:45
5.	"Suspended Space"		8:24
6.	"Unconditional Love"		6:04
7.	"Feel What You Feel"		8:25
Total length:			45:46

== Personnel ==
Credits adapted from liner notes.

- D. Williamson – keyboards (A7), production
- A. Hamil – bass guitar (A1, B1)
- A. Ross – flute (A1, B1, B3, B4, B6), saxophone (A2, B1, B6)
- S. Vispi – electronics (A1), mixing (A4–B1, B3–B5, B7), additional mixing (A3, B2, B6)
- O. Lomax – mixing (A1)
- D. Duncan – mixing (A2, A3, B2, B6)
- M. Holmes – voice (A4)
- S. Holmes – voice (A4)
- D. Holmes – voice (A4)
- L. King – voice (A4)
- J. King – voice (A4)
- G. Westerhoff – cello (A6, A7)
- Elliot – vocals (B1)
- C. Campbell – guitar (B1)
- N. Purser – artwork

== Charts ==
Chart	Peak position
UK Albums (OCC)	40
