= Risc vs. Reward =

EP by Photek
- Released: July 22, 1997
- Genre: Downtempo; Drum and bass Electronica
- Length: 39:28
- Label: Astralwerks/Caroline/Virgin/EMI Records; 0170 4 66202 2 2 ASW 66202
- Producer: Photek

Photek chronology
Risc vs. Reward (1997)	Modus Operandi (1997)

Professional ratings
Review scores
Source	Rating
Allmusic	4/5 stars

Risc vs. Reward is compilation EP from drum and bass artist Photek. It combines tracks from his previous EPs The Hidden Camera and Ni-Ten-Ichi-Ryu.

== Track listing ==
1. "K.J.Z." – 7:47
2. "The Hidden Camera" – 6:47
3. "The Hidden Camera (Static Mix)" – 6:18
4. "Hybrid" – 5:15
5. "Ni-Ten-Ichi-Ryu (Two Swords Technique)" – 5:56
6. "The Fifth Column" – 7:08

== Ni-Ten-Ichi-Ryu (Two Swords Technique) ==
"Ni-Ten-Ichi-Ryu (Two Swords Technique)" featured in the film Blade (1998).

Released as a single in 1997, the song reached #37 on the UK Singles Chart.

== See also ==
- Niten Ichi-ryū – a koryū (ancient school), transmitting a style of classical Japanese swordsmanship conceived by the warrior Miyamoto Musashi.
