= Paradox (musician) =

British drumfunk musician

Dev Pandya
- Also known as: Alaska; Brown; Dev
- Born: Goalpara; December 10, 1974 (age 51)
- Genres: Drum and bass, drumfunk
- Occupations: Musician, producer
- Labels: Reinforced Records, Paradox Music, Outsider, Esoteric, Secret Operations
- Website: www.paradoxmusic.com

Paradox is the pseudonym of Dev Pandya, a British producer. He also records under the pseudonyms Alaska. From 1994 to 2020, Pandya went by the alias Brown in collaboration with Rhymeside (Scott Williams), DJ Trax (David Davies) and Dangerman. Under the name DMR Pandya released tracks as Paradox & DMR on the label Certificate 18 in 1998.

His music has been categorized as drumfunk.

== Career ==
Pandya was born in 1970s England. He has recorded as a duo with producer Nucleus, and has regularly collaborated with artist Seba. Pandya runs four record labels: Paradox Music, Esoteric, Outsider, and Arctic Music. He also ran the labels Mob Handed, Stronghold Records and Offset Recordings together with Davies from 1994 to 1997.

Paradox released his first full-length album Musician as Outsider in 2000 on Reinforced Records as single artist. Both the CD and LP releases have ten tracks on them, but the CD version had a bonus CD with live PA-footage from Paradox's 2000 tour. There was a special Japan version of the CD, released by Sony Japan, which featured changed patterns, different run times and the bonus-track "The Unspoken Divide". In 2002 the second Paradox album, again on Reinforced came out, called What You Don't Know. The LP version features ten tracks and the double CD release has 12 tracks on CD 1 and video footage from the 2002 live tour on CDVD (CD 2).

In 2004, the album The Esoteric Funk by Nucleus & Paradox was again released on Reinforced Records. Nucleus' real name is Dave Sims. Sims and Pandya had released a CD album before in 1997 which is called Noise & Paradox – Transmograpfication. At that time Simms went by the name "Noise". Paradox released the first CD Seba & Paradox – Beats Me on his label Paradox Music in 2006 featuring tracks from Seba, Paradox and Seba & Paradox collaborations. In 2007, Paradox released the first CD on his label Outsider called Paradox Presents: The Age of Outsiders featuring selected tracks from all releases on Outsider. CD 1 was mixed by Nucleus and CD 2 was mixed by DJ Trax.

In collaboration with Bill Laswell and Herbie Hancock, Paradox is featured on the album Method of Defiance – Inamorata on the label Ohm Resistance with two tracks. While the track "Panepha" has Paradox programmed the drums, Hancock plays the keyboard and Laswell the bass. The track "Humanoid" has Paradox, again drum programmer, Toshinori Kondo on the trumpet, Bernie Worrell on the keyboards and Laswell as usual on the bass. The album was released in 2007.

He did remixes of his own tracks and the tracks by such artists as Deep Blue, Resound, Shobha Gurtu, LTJ Bukem, Materia, Ultra-Violet, James Hardway, Kirsty Hawkshaw, Ill Logic & Raf, Duo Infernale, DJ Trax, NXS, Boom Boom Satellites, and Justice.

== Discography ==
As Paradox

- Musician as an Outsider (2000)
- What You Don't Know (2002)
- The Musician As Outsider Reinforcement (2003)
- Silently Screaming (2005)
- Ecliptic (2008)
- Up from tha Nap (2008)
- Ramifications (2011)

== See also ==
- List of jungle and drum and bass artists
