= Exorcise the Demons =

Studio album by Source Direct
- Released: March 1999
- Recorded: 1998–99
- Genre: Drum and bass
- Length: 73:56
- Label: Astralwerks; Virgin Records

Source Direct chronology
Controlled Developments (1997)	Exorcise the Demons (1999)

Professional ratings
Review scores
Source	Rating
AllMusic	4.5/5 stars
Robert Christgau	A−

Exorcise the Demons is a studio album by drum and bass artists Source Direct, released in 1999. The album contains 9 tracks, three of which, "Concealed Identity", "Mind Weaver", and "Technical Warfare", are previously released singles. "Call & Response" and "Capital D" are available on the duo's previous compilation album, Controlled Developments (1997).

"Call & Response" appears in the 1998 film Blade, in which the track is being listened to, on headphones, by the villain, Deacon Frost (Stephen Dorff), whilst he searches a library's archives; the song did not appear on the film's soundtrack.

== Critical reception ==
Robert Christgau praised the "beats developed in perceptible patterns, prudently minimalist middle registers, fun vrooms and slams as musical content", and called it "light instrumental music at its diverting best".

Fact ranked it #96 on its list of the 100 best albums of the 1990s, writing that it's "a thrilling document of smacked-out, misanthropic jungle for stalkers, serial killers and ne’er-do-wells".

== Track listing ==
1. "Call & Response" – 7:09
2. "Mind Weaver" – 8:45
3. "Haunted" – 6:45
4. "Technical Warfare" – 8:42
5. "Love & Hate" – 9:22
6. "Capital D" – 7:36
7. "Dubstar" – 7:21
8. "Wanton Conduct" – 8:43
9. "Concealed Identity" – 9:33
