= MC Conrad =

- Born: Conrad Thompson; April 16, 1972; Northampton, England
- Died: April 30, 2024 (aged 52)
- Genres: Drum and bass, Jungle
- Occupations: MC, vocalist, music producer
- Years active: 1980s–2024
- Labels: Good Looking Records, Resonance

Conrad Thompson (16 April 1972 – 30 April 2024), known professionally as MC Conrad, was a British vocalist, MC, and music producer. His career, spanning over three decades, was marked by a distinctive style that blended elements of jazz, hip hop, and soul with drum and bass.

== Early life ==
Conrad Thompson was born in Northampton, England. Thompson was influenced by his early exposure to music from his father's record collection of ska, rocksteady, bluebeat, and reggae. He first gained attention in the local breakdancing scene during the 1980s.

== Career ==
Thompson started in the UK hip hop scene but shifted towards rave and drum and bass as the genres began to gain momentum in the early 90s. Thompson partnered and collaborated with LTJ Bukem, which lead to the establishment of Good Looking Records in 1991. Thompson would also launch his own label, Resonance, in 2020.

== Personal life ==
In 2010, Thompson moved to Birmingham, where he became an integral part of the community. He spoke warmly of Birmingham's spirit and diversity. Later in life, he reconnected with his father, a notable figure in the city's Caribbean community.

== Death and legacy ==
Thompson died on 30 April 2024, aged 52.

In honour of Thompson's legacy and commitment to nurturing young talent, the MC Conrad Foundation was established in June 2024. The foundation aims to support young and emerging artists within the challenging landscape of the music industry.

== Discography ==
=== Studio albums ===
- Progression Sessions Vol 1–7
- Vocalist 01

=== Live Albums ===
- Progression Sessions: Live
- Progression Sessions: UK Live 2003

== See also ==
- LTJ Bukem
- Good Looking Records
- Drum and bass
