= The Longcut =

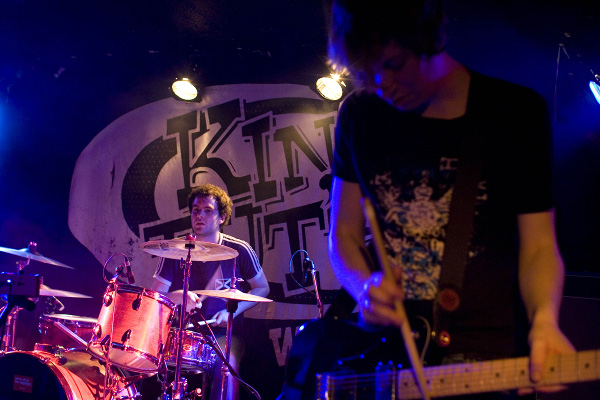
- The Longcut in 2007. Left to right: Stuart Ogilvie and Lee Gale. Not pictured: Jon Fearon

Background information
- Origin: Manchester, England
- Genres: Indie rock, indietronica, post-punk revival
- Years active: 2002–present
- Labels: Deltasonic, Melodic
- Members: Stuart Ogilvie; Lee Gale; Jon Fearon
- Website: http://www.thelongcut.com/

The Longcut are an English rock band, formed in 2002 in Manchester.

== Career ==
The Longcut formed in Manchester in 2002 while attending the University of Manchester. Originally a four-piece, Stuart Ogilvie (vocals, writing and drums) would meet a vocalist named Mark (last name unknown), who said he wanted to sing in a band. The pair would begin to play song covers with a rotating roster of guitarists but struggled to find a musical style they enjoyed. Six months later, Ogilvie received a demo tape of a song written by Lee Gale (guitar) from a mutual friend while Mark would meet Jon Fearon (bass) through the student newspaper. Soon, the group decided to rent out a room in Ancoats to rehearse together. Not long after, Mark soon left the band and the remaining members intended to make purely instrumental music. Months later, Ogilvie would begin to sing on more of their tracks and in 2003, the band began to experiment with cheap drum machines which led to a new sound and unusual stage setup.

The Longcut would get their band name from an Uncle Tupelo song with the same title. Originally chosen as a temporary name only to participate in a music competition, the members forgot to change the name and “The Longcut” would stick.

In 2004, the band recorded a demo at Fearon’s house in Cumbria and a few of their friends would send out the demo to a multitude of labels, which brought them to the attention of the record industry, including Liverpool's Deltasonic label. Soon, the band would get a call from Deltasonic to come and rehearse for them. At the rehearsal, the band met Deltasonic executives, Alan Willis and Joe Fearon, whom they befriended and quickly received a contract from. During 2004 the band also became friends with Manchester promoters Akoustik Anarkhy and indie/grunge band, Nine Black Alps. The two groups shared bills together at various house parties (one in Longsight was filmed for the video to "Transition") organised by Akoustik Anarkhy and The Longcut, eventually touring together in early 2006.

The Longcut released their debut EP Transition in November 2004, followed by A Quiet Life in June 2005 Both EPs sold out and were well received by the music press. The band continued to tour throughout 2005, including appearances at SXSW, the John Peel stage at Glastonbury Festival and the Red Marquee at Fuji Rock Festival.

Work on their debut album, A Call and Response, began in the summer of 2005. Production duties were handled by Jonny Dollar, and was mixed by TV on the Radio's David Andrew Sitek. The band would internationally release a self-titled mini-album (a compilation of their UK EPs) in 2006.

A Call and Response was released on June 12th, 2006, followed by "Vitamin C" as a lead promotional single with "A Tried and Tested Method" soon following on October 2nd. The singles continued to attract intrigue around the band. The music video for A Tried and Tested Method would also be featured on MTV2’s NME chart, with the video being played frequently on a multitude of UK music channels. The album would be ranked number 19 on NME’s top albums of 2006.

After A Call and Response the band released The Airtight Sessions EP on August 31st, a compilation of the band's previous work and one new song "Idiot Check" making up the four-track listing. The EP was made available as a free download for all subscribers to the band's official site for a limited time, then made available for purchase at Apple Computer's iTunes Store.

The next release by the band was a 7-inch single distributed by Melodic Records on March 19th, 2007. Limited to 500 copies, the double A-side featured "Idiot Check" (recorded at the sessions for A Call and Response) and a cover of the Candi Staton rave track "You Got the Love".

In late 2007, the band was dropped by Deltasonic due to management changes at Sony. It would later be reflected on that the label also had too high of expectations for them and didn't see the band as profitable enough.

On September 6th, 2009, their second album, Open Hearts, was released. It was written and recorded right after the release of their debut. It was also produced by Nine Black Alps guitarist David Jones. Open Hearts was released by Melodic Records as a download in June of 2009, then on CD and LP in October. It was followed in 2010 by an EP, Broken Hearts, consisting of remixes of songs from the album. Open Hearts was well received but had significantly less coverage before quickly dropping out of relevance. “It definitely came out at the wrong time,” Ogilvie reflects.

Another album slated to be released in 2012, written right off the heels of Open Hearts, but the release was subsequently shot down by their record label as the material was deemed “not good enough”. The writing and recording would later be stated as rushed due to personal pressures and self imposed deadlines.

The band would later return with their third album, Arrows, which was released on April 7th, 2018. It was distributed by Deltasonic once more. The album was primarily self produced and recorded in their own studio whenever they had free time. Four of the ten songs were leftovers from their previously rejected album yet the recording process was still slow. By mid 2016, recording was complete. The band enlisted the help of a longtime friend, Tom Knott to mix the album while Carl Saff mastered it. The album would be positively received.

== Members ==
- Stuart Ogilvie - vocals, keyboard, drums
- Lee Gale - guitar
- Jon Fearon - bass

== Discography ==
=== Studio albums ===
- A Call and Response 12 June 2006 (UK)
- Open Hearts 6 June 2009 (UK)
- Arrows 20 April 2018 (UK)

=== Singles and EPs ===
- November 2004 - Transition - Limited edition EP, not chart eligible.
- April 2005 - A Quiet Life - Limited edition EP, not chart eligible.
- November 2005 - The Longcut - 5 track Japanese EP.
- Various release dates, 2006 - The Longcut - 6 track international mini-album.
- July 2006 - "Vitamin C" - Download & 12-inch Vinyl single.
- August 2006 - Airtight / Idiot Check EP - 4 track download only live EP.
- October 2006 - "A Tried & Tested Method" - Download, CD & coloured vinyl single.
- March 2007 - "Idiot Check" / "You Got The Love" - Limited 7-inch and download.
- 2010 - Broken Hearts - 7 track EP.
