= Blu Mar Ten =

Music production group based in London

- Also known as: BMT; Blumarten; Old Man Dem
- Origin: London, England
- Genres: Drum and bass, house, breakbeat, ambient, techno
- Years active: 1995–present
- Labels: Blu Mar Ten Music, Hospital Records, Good Looking Records, Exceptional Records, Med School, Renegade Hardware, Shogun Audio, 31 Records
- Members: Chris Marigold; Michael Tognarelli
- Website: www.blumarten.com

Blu Mar Ten is a music production group based in London, and is made up of Chris Marigold and Michael Tognarelli.

== History ==
Blu Mar Ten's first track to be released was "The Fountain" / "Lunar" in 1996 on Way Out Records. The track appeared on compilations and was named by Fabio as his 'tune of the year'. This was followed by the Blu Mar Ten remix of Erykah Badu's first single "On & On" for MCA Records, which reached the top 10 music chart. Following these releases Blu Mar Ten were offered a long-term deal by LTJ Bukem's Good Looking Records. This partnership saw releases on the label including features on the Logical Progression, Earth and Progression Sessions LPs and tracks on Good Looking's partner labels. A dedicated artist EP and Blu Mar Ten artist compilation LP were also released by Good Looking.

In early 2001 Blu Mar Ten and Good Looking Records parted company. Following this Blu Mar Ten has produced breaks for Rennie Pilgrem's label TCR and Danny Macmillan's In-flight label, 2-step garage for Lime, tech-house for Guidance Recordings and left-field downbeat for the Big Chill, Exceptional Records and Naked Music. They have also taken on remix duties for Erykah Badu again, Terry Lee Brown Junior, Joey Negro, The Ananda Project and Annie Lennox.

Blu Mar Ten tracks have been played by DJs Tom "The Jedi" Middleton, Chris Coco & Rob da Bank, Felix da Housecat, Bobby Friction, Ben Watt, Carl Cox, Lee Burridge, Erol Alkan, Howie B and Mary Anne Hobbs.

September 2003 saw the release of the first Blu Mar Ten album following their split with Good Looking Records, The Six Million Names of God, on Exceptional Records. The LP represented work from 1997 through to 2003 and focused on the downbeat side of the duo than the dance floor material for which they were initially recognised. The album featured collaborations with Blame (720 Recordings / Charged), Nor Elle (Plastic City) and Fink (Ninja Tune).

In 2004, Wyndham and Marigold were joined by Michael Tognarelli. As a teenager in Manchester, Tognarelli had worked in Eastern Bloc and Spin Inn record shops with Marcus Intalex and Sappo.

During 2005 and 2006, Blu Mar Ten returned to producing drum and bass with releases on labels Hospital Records, Nookie's Phuzion Records, Friction's Shogun Audio, Basement Recordings, John B's Tangent Recordings, Renegade Hardware, Subject 13's Vibez Recordings and Doc Scott's 31 Records.

September 2007 saw the release of the album Black Water, which featured vocal tracks with guests Alexis Strum, Kameel and Ernesto. The singles were released around the launch of the album included remixes from Tom Middleton, Sabre, Kubiks, Cicada and Blu Mar Ten themselves.

In 2009, Blu Mar Ten released their Natural History drum and bass project, with the Close and Believe Me EPs early in the year, and the album Natural History following in November. A series of remixes from the album were released in 2010, featuring versions by Seba, Klute, Bop, Stray, Badmammal & Kastle.

In 2011 Blu Mar Ten released the Love is the Devil album, following it in 2012 with remixes of the album tracks from dBridge, Marcus Intalex, Joe Syntax, Unquote, Sunchase & BCee.

During 2012 Blu Mar Ten expanded their label, (rebranding it "Blu Mar Ten Music" or "BMTM") and started releasing music from other artists.

In 2013 Blu Mar Ten released their 6th album Famous Lost Words.

In 2016 Blu Mar Ten released their 7th album Empire State.

== Licensed tracks ==
Blu Mar Ten tracks have been licensed to Rockstar Games video games. Two tracks, "Home Videos" and "Simon and Lisa" were featured in the 2003 racing title Midnight Club II and the track "Trauma" was featured in the 2006 title, Rockstar Games Presents Table Tennis.

The track "Emi's Song" was featured in Konami's 2007 music video game, Dance Dance Revolution Universe 2, and was clipped from Architex's “Altitude (Blu Mar Ten Remix)”.

== Discography ==
=== Albums ===
- Producer 03 (2000 – Good Looking Records)
- The Six Million Names of God (2003 – Exceptional Records)
- Black Water (2007 – Exceptional Records)
- Natural History (2009 – Blu Mar Ten Records)
- Love is the Devil (2011 – Blu Mar Ten Records)
- Famous Lost Words (2013 – Blu Mar Ten Records)
- Empire State (2016 – Blu Mar Ten Music)
- Wardown (2020 – Blu Mar Ten Music)

=== Singles and album appearances ===
- The Fountain / Lunar – Way Out Records (1996)
- Slipstream / Futureproof – Good Looking Records (1997)
- Global Access / Myriad – Looking Good Records (1997)
- Blu Mar Ten / PHD & Conrad – Slipstream / Future Proof / Progression Session / 3 By 4 (CD, Maxi) – Good Looking Records (1997)
- Fall / Suspended Animation – Ascendant Grooves (1998)
- Butterflies & Moths / Osaka – 720 Degrees (1998)
- Blu Mar Ten / Akira (6) / Nu Moon* – B.R.O / Yellow River / Dark Matter / Sakhmet (2x12") – Good Looking Records (2000)
- Fisher King – Lime Limited (2001)
- The Conversationalist – In-Flight Entertainment (2001)
- I'm Still Waiting / Tea & Sympathy – ISW (2001)
- The Swarm – Thursday Club Recordings TCR (2001)
- Blu Mar Ten / Abacus – Mace / Black Thanx (16B Mix) – Guidance Recordings (2001)
- Clarky Cats / Slow Stop – Deep Structure (2002)
- Storyteller / Storyteller (Blame Remix) – Deep Structure (2002)
- Untitled #1 / Numbers – Deep Structure (2002)
- Infected / Blurunner – Deep Structure (2003)
- The Sky EP Series No. 6 – Exceptional (2003)
- The Feeling / Drendie Girl – Deep Structure (2003)
- Fitness / Rouge – Deep Structure (2004)
- Why Me Why Now – Exceptional Records (2008)
- Five Summers / Still the One (2011)
- Problem Child / Sweet Little Supernova (2011)
- All Thoughts Are Prayers (2012)
- The Beginning / Blue Skies / All or Nothing (2012)
- Blind Soul / Damage (2012)
- Somewhere / Half The Sky (2013)

=== Compilations and EPs ===
- Everglades (1999 – Good Looking Records) compilation
- Producer 03 (2002 – Good Looking Records) A dispute caused by the release of this Blu Mar Ten artist compilation by Good Looking Records prompted the separation of both parties.
- Weapons of Mass Creation 3 (2007 – Hospital Records) compilation
- The Chillout Lounge (2007 – I Label) compilation
- Renaissance: 3D (2008 – Renaissance) mixed compilation
- The Chillout Lounge More... Downtempo Grooves For Late Night Lounging (2008 – I Label) compilation
