= Ku Palm =

KU:PALM

Studio album by Photek
- Released: 23 October 2012
- Genre: Electronica, electronic dance music
- Length: 65:44
- Label: Photek Productions

Photek chronology
Form & Function Vol. 2 (2007)	KU:PALM (2012)

KU:PALM is the fifth album by Photek, released on 23 October 2012 via photek.fm and on 30 October 2012 as a wide release. The song "Pyramid" from the album was made available as a free download on 4 October. KU:PALM is Photek's first full-length album of all-new material since Solaris, released in 2000.

== Track listing ==
1. "Signals" – 5:57
2. "Quadrant" – 5:21
3. "Aviator" – 6:24
4. "Pyramid" – 4:28
5. "Shape Charge" – 6:01
6. "Munich" – 4:35
7. "Quevedo" – 5:04
8. "Mistral" – 5:15
9. "Oshun" – 5:05
10. "Sleepwalking" (featuring Linche) – 6:11
11. "One of a Kind" (featuring Breakage and Veronika Coassolo) – 5:48
12. "This Love" (featuring Ray LaMontagne) – 5:35

== Charts ==
Chart performance for Ku Palm
Chart (2012)	Peak position
UK Dance Albums (OCC)	29
