= Aphrodite (musician) =

British DJ and producer (born 1968)

- Also known as: A-Zone, DJ Aphro
- Born: Gavin King; 28 November 1968 (age 57); Aberystwyth, Wales
- Genres: Drum and bass, jungle, breakbeat hardcore
- Occupations: DJ, producer
- Years active: 1990–present
- Labels: Urban Takeover, Aphrodite Recordings, Aladdin, Aphrodite Mix, Aphradan, V2 Recordings, UMG
- Website: www.aphro.co.uk

Gavin King (born 28 November 1968), better known by his stage name Aphrodite, is a British jungle and drum and bass DJ/producer. He is also known as A Zone or DJ Aphro. He has contributed to and influenced the genre's styles and techniques.

== Background ==
Gavin King was born in Aberystwyth, Wales. His family relocated to London when he was a toddler. He has studied computer science and attended Coventry University and was also at University of Warwick.

== Career ==
King's first release was an EP, Cellar 4. He was half of breakbeat hardcore duo Urban Shakedown (with DJ/producer Micky Finn), which scored a UK top 40 hit with "Some Justice" in 1992. The duo appeared in an article of Amiga Format magazine after using two Amiga 500 computers to help create the track.

His DJ moniker and his label Aphrodite Recordings share the Aphrodite name which he began using when running parties at University of Warwick in 1988. His debut album, released in 1999, was a self-titled effort under V2 Recordings. The follow-up Aftershock was released on 24 June 2002 under V2 Recordings also.

Some of his music has been featured in movies and TV series, including CSI: Crime Scene Investigation. He has created remixes for Nine Inch Nails and Dub War.

== Discography ==
=== Albums ===
- Aphrodite - Recordings (Yellow cover) (1997)
- Aphrodite (1999)
- Aftershock (2002)
- Break in Reality (2007)

=== CD mixes ===
- Urban Jungle (1999)
- Aph44 (2003)
- Urban Junglist (2003)
- Urbanthology Volume 1 (2005)
- Overdrive (2005)

=== CDs ===
- See Thru It (2004)

=== Compilations ===
- Park Rave Madness (1998)
- The Takeover Bid: Round 1 (1998)
- Egil Music Presents: Urban Jungle (1999)

=== Singles and EPs ===
- 1992 "Some Justice / Bass Quake" (with Urban Shakedown)
- 1994 "Calling All The People" (as A-Zone)
- 1996 "Bad Ass" (with Micky Finn)
- 1997 "Style From The Darkside"
- 1999 "BM Funkster"
- 2002 "All Over Me" (feat. Barrington Levy) - UK No. 76
- 2002 "See Thru It" (feat. Wildflower) - UK No. 68
- 2003 "Bad Ass (Reissue)" (with Micky Finn)
- 2003 "Rinsing Quince"
- 2003 "Let the Rhythm Flow / Stalker"
- 2003 "Cool Flight"
- 2003 "Music's Hypnotizing / King of the Beats"
- 2003 "Mash Up Ya Know"
- 2003 "Def Jammer"
- 2003 "Cocaine / Calling the People"
- 2004 "Fanfare / Karma Sutra"
- 2024 "Style From The Darkside" (Trippcore remix)

== See also ==
- Drum and bass
- Jungle music
- Bass music
