= Noise Factory =

English breakbeat hardcore group

- Genres: Breakbeat hardcore, jungle
- Years active: 1991–1994, 2002
- Labels: 3rd Party, Ibiza, Kemet, Tam Tam, XL Recordings
- Past members: James Stephens; Terry Turner; Kevin Mulqueen

Noise Factory were a British breakbeat hardcore and jungle group from Tottenham, North London active in the early 1990s. The group is credited as being pivotal in the transition between hardcore and jungle music.

== History ==
In 1991 James Stephens and Neil Dunkley, who ran a small studio in Tottenham together at the time, became acquainted with Paul Ibiza of Ibiza Records. They helped him set up his new studio which consisted of an Akai 950 sampler an Atari ST computer running Cubase and various other pieces of studio equipment. After a few sessions of creating beats and experimenting with samples at Paul Ibizas studio Stephens decided on the name 'Noise Factory' bringing in Kevin Mulqueen and Terry Turner to form the group along with Dunkley. Paul Ibiza then invited Noise Factory to release tracks on his then new label Ibiza Records as he was already a well established name in the rave scene at that time. Noise Factory released their first track, "Box Bass" in 1991. The track featured a reggae sub-bass, which was almost unheard of at the time.

After releasing several tracks on the Ibiza label Stephens, Turner and Mulqueen set up their own label '3rd Party Records' in early 1992. They also had one short lived release on Tam Tam records in early 1992 titled “behold the jungle/we can". They later re-issued “behold the jungle” on 3rd party a few months later. At this point Dunkley had already left the group but later went on to set up his own label Redskins records.

Stephens would also help set up the 'Kemet' record label with Mark Ranger aka ‘Mark X’ sometime between 1992-93.

Noise Factory's first release on their 3rd Party label was the EP "My Mind" featuring the title track "My Mind", “Be Free" and "Breakage #1" all of which would be pivotal in the early development of jungle and would be later remixed by the group several times. The group would continue to release singles such as "the fire", which sampled Fleetwood Mac's "Sara".

“Be Free” was also licensed to XL records in mid 1992 and released on a four track EP titled “fourplay” vol 1 alongside three other artists.

Noise factory’s own studio from 1991-93 where their later Ibiza tracks and the majority of their 3rd party tracks were produced was based in Stephens flat on the Nightingale estate in Lower Clapton East London. The Nightingale estate was also home to some of the main jungle and drum and bass pirate radio stations in London at that time which included Weekend Rush 92.3, Defection 89.4 and Kool FM 94.5 (later 94.6). Noise factory subsequently befriended a few of the DJ's on Defection at the time such as Miley, Stitch, Mixmaster Max etc and would often give Defection early release exclusives of their tracks. Terry Tee (Turner) would occasionally guest DJ on Defection and Chatta B would also MC on the station quite frequently.

In 1993, The Capsule EP was released. The track "Breakage #4" became a huge hit with DJs, who according to Vice "played it to death". The track was up to 20 BPM faster than other tracks at the time, and would prove to be an important record in the transition from hardcore to jungle. Noise Factory proceeded to release several 12" singles that would set a blueprint for the emerging scene. Additionally, a side project known as Straight from the Bedroom was launched, releasing records from not only themselves, but also other up-and-coming jungle producers.

A final collaboration between Stephens and Turner would be on "Dreams", released on Kemet Records' "Revelation Part 2" EP. Stephens would maintain a solo career under the name Family of Intelligence.. Terry Tee (Turner) has had his own label 'Knowledge and Wisdom' for a number of years and has released tracks sporadically on it.

Noise Factory was briefly revived in 2002, releasing two singles for Three Lions Recordings. Additionally, Terry Tee had resurrected the Straight From the Bedroom side-project in the 2000s to carry nu skool jungle bootlegs.

== Members ==
- James Stephens
- Terry (Tee) Turner
- Kevin Mulqueen
- Neil Dunkley (on some early Noise Factory Ibiza releases)
- Anthony Patterson (aka MC Chatta B contributed on some 3rd party releases)

== Selected discography ==
- "Box Bass / Recession Time" (1991)
- "Who Are You / The Dungeon" (1991)
- "Noise Factory / Warehouse Music" (1991)
- "The Buzz / Imperative" (1991)
- "Loving You / Jungle Techno" (1991)
- "Feel the Music / To the Top" (1991)
- "Set Me Free / Bring Forward the Noise" (1992)
- "We Have It / Warning" (1992)
- "Urban Music" (1992)
- "Behold the Jungle / We Can" (1992)
- "My Mind / Be Free" (1992)
- "The Fire / Skin Teeth" (1992)
- Alienation EP (1992)
- The Capsule EP (Breakage#4 / Futuroid / Survival)" (1992)
- Year of the Ladies EP (1993)
- A New Something EP (1993)
- "Generation X" (1993)
- "Can You Feel the Rush / Run Come Follow Me" (1993)
- "The Future" (1994)
