= Michele Sainte =

American DJ

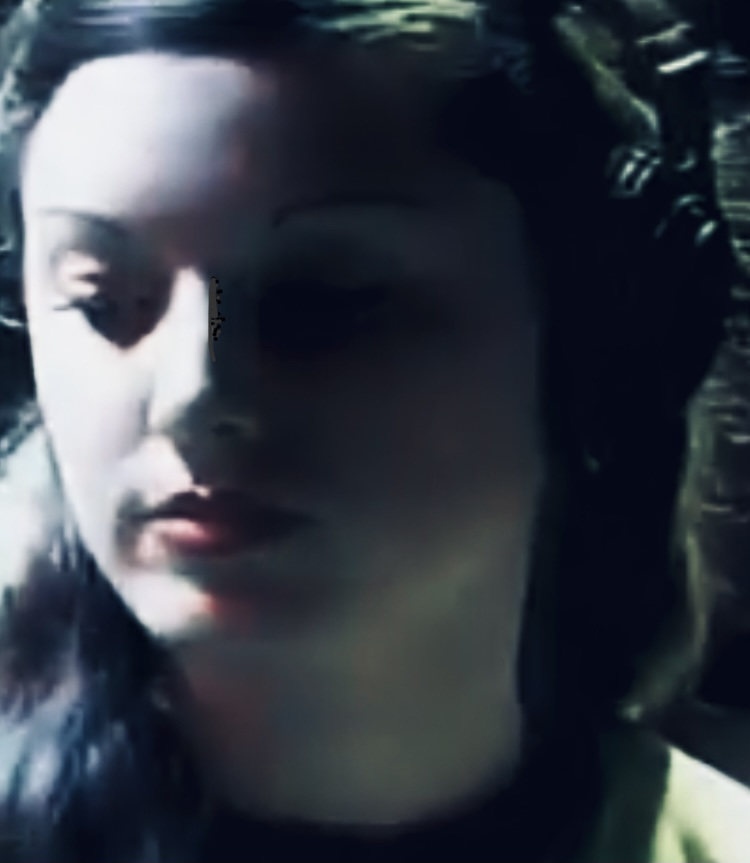

Background information
- Also known as: Sainte Michele; Techstep Selectoress; The Sainte
- Origin: United States
- Genres: Drum and bass, breakbeat hardcore, jungle, (early) techno, techstep, Witchstep
- Instruments: DJ mixer, turntables
- Years active: 1986–present

Michele Sainte is an American drum and bass DJ and former techno DJ that mixes vinyl, as opposed to digital files.

== 1990–present: Clubs and raves ==
Sainte is a former breakbeat hardcore and techno DJ that is also "widely regarded as one of the States' premiere female drumandbass DJs" according to Dieselboy. She is a self-taught DJ known for mixing the techstep subgenre of drum and bass.

She has DJed throughout North America at clubs and raves as a breakbeat and techno DJ on a regular basis beginning in 1990, dedicating herself exclusively to the Drum&Bass genre by 1995 and performing alongside artists such as 808 State, Joey Beltram, Meat Beat Manifesto.

She became a frequent guest DJ at music venues including City Gardens in Trenton, New Jersey, Guernica (formerly Save the Robots) in Manhattan, The Shelter (New York City), and The Stone Pony in Asbury Park, New Jersey. Also, she was asked to be a resident DJ at Club Zadar in New Hope, Pennsylvania, in January 1990, introducing techno to the new wave venue. In addition, she became a resident DJ at several venues in Philadelphia including Evolution and Skyline. She is considered one of the first female techno DJs from North America and has been cited as "the original East Coast female drum and bass DJ".

Sainte has acknowledged the support of DJ Lenny Dee. Dieselboy has also been known to support her. She also convinced Rhys Fulber, after he met her in the “early nineties” when she worked as a Techno DJ, to eventually produce Techno and use his German name as opposed to an alias.

== 1986-1999: Radio ==
Sainte became licensed by the FCC in 1986, whilst still a high school student and went on to do her first radio show that same year at WCVH in New Jersey. At WCVH, she exclusively played Industrial, New Wave, and Punk. She also worked at WFMU (named the “best radio station in the nation” by Rolling Stone magazine from 1991 through 1994) and WPRB at Princeton University. In 1995, she created and DJed on a program with live mixing at WPRB that she called Bassquake. Bassquake aired every Friday for five years. It was the United States's first drum and bass/jungle program to air on a commercial FM radio station.

== Discography ==
=== DJ mixes ===
- Fluid Sessions - at Fluid nightclub in Philadelphia, Bioforce Recordings, 1998

=== Dubplates ===
- Badlands (1996)
- Pitch Black (1996)
- The Unseen (1997)
- Retribution with 1.8.7 (1999)
- Dreammaker with Rhys Fulber (2008)
- Diamonds from Your Eyes (2021)
- Deadlock (2024)
- Skyclad (2024)
- Roberta Sparrow (2024)
- Killer in the Home (remix) (2024)
- Like Cockatoos (remix) (2024)

== Personal life ==
Sainte is a vegan, regularly advocating for veganism on her social media. She is also Wiccan, having trained in California in person with Zsuzsanna Budapest. She lives on the East Coast with her calico cat.
