= Controlled Developments =

EP by Source Direct
- Released: November 4, 1997
- Genre: Drum and bass
- Length: 45:17
- Label: Astralwerks

Source Direct chronology
| Controlled Developments (1997) | Exorcise the Demons (1999) |

Professional ratings
Review scores
| Source | Rating |
|---|---|
| Allmusic | 4/5 stars |

Controlled Developments is an EP by drum and bass artists Source Direct, which was released November 4, 1997. The album is composed entirely of previously released singles.

== Track listing ==
1. "Call & Response" – 7:15
2. "Computer State" – 7:39
3. "Black Domina" – 7:34
4. "Enemy Lines" – 8:03
5. "Two Masks" – 7:05
6. "Capital D" – 7:41

== In popular culture ==
The track, "Call & Response", appeared in a scene from the 1998 film Blade in which the track is being listened to, on headphones, by the villain, Deacon Frost (Stephen Dorff), whilst he searches a library's archives. However, the song did not appear on the film's soundtrack.
