= Form & Function Vol. 2 =

Compilation album by Photek
- Released: September 24, 2007
- Recorded: 1990s–2000s
- Genre: Drum and bass
- Length: 76:40
- Label: Sanctuary Records

Photek chronology
Solaris (2000)	Form & Function Vol. 2 (2007)	KU PALM (2012)

Singles from Form & Function Vol. 2
- 1. "Love & War" Released: September 17, 2007

Form & Function Vol. 2 is Photek's fourth studio album. It is a collection of dubplates and remixes plus some exclusives. It was released September 24, 2007 on the Sanctuary Records label. There was also a vinyl release of the LP for DJs.

Professional ratings
Review scores
Source	Rating
AllMusic	3.5/5 stars

== Track listing ==
1. "Industry of Noise" – 5:27
2. "Love & War (Album Version)" – 5:04
  Featuring Chiara (vocals)
3. "Things" – 5:53
  Featuring Robert Owens (vocals)
4. "Ni Ten Ichi Ryu (TeeBee remix)" – 5:04
5. "Deadly Technology" – 5:32
6. "Sidewinder (Hochi & Infiltrata remix)" – 6:50
7. "One Nation" – 5:50
8. "Saturated Hip Hop" – 6:35
9. "Man Down" – 6:06
  Featuring Tech Itch & Teebee
10. "Thunder (Die & Clipz remix)" – 5:51
11. "The Beginning" – 5:16
12. "Full Spectrum Dominance" – 6:15
  Featuring Hochi
13. "Baltimore (Tech Itch & Dylan remix)" – 6:58
