= Form & Function =

Compilation album by Photek
- Released: 14 September 1998
- Genre: Drum and bass
- Length: 79:28
- Label: Science, Astralwerks
- Producer: Rupert Parkes

Photek chronology
Modus Operandi (1997)	Form & Function (1998)	Solaris (2000)

Professional ratings
Review scores
Source	Rating
AllMusic	5/5 stars
The Independent	4/5 stars
Muzik	4/5 stars
NME	7/10
Pitchfork	7.8/10
Select	4/5
Spin	7/10

Form & Function is the second album by British drum and bass artist Photek. It was released on 14 September 1998 on the Virgin Records sublabel Science Records in Europe and on Astralwerks in the US. The album is made up of older Photek tracks that were previously only available on 12" vinyl. The first six tracks of the album are remixes by Photek himself and other drum and bass artists, while the second six tracks are the original versions. The last track on this album (no. 12) contains samples of the so-called "Halt Tape", recorded at the occasion of the Rendlesham Forest incident.

== Track listing ==
1. "The Seven Samurai" (Photek remix) – 6:56
2. "The Margin '98" (Doc Scott Remix) – 6:52
3. "The Lightening" (Digital Remix) – 5:53
4. "Rings Around Saturn" (Peshay & Decoder Remix) – 8:00
5. "Resolution" (Photek remix) – 6:39
6. "UFO" (J Majik Remix) – 6:15
7. "Knitevision" – 6:40
8. "Santiago" – 6:09
9. "The Seven Samurai" – 6:51
10. "Rings Around Saturn" – 7:24
11. "The Water Margin" – 5:29
12. "UFO" – 6:16

== Charts ==
Chart performance for Form & Function
Chart (1998)	Peak position
UK Albums (OCC)	61
