= A Call and Response =

A Call And Response

Studio album by The Longcut
- Released: 12 June 2006
- Recorded: September 2005 – October 2005
- Studios: Townhouse Studios, Konk Studios, Mayfair Studios (London): Parkgate Studios (Sussex)
- Genres: Indie rock, post-punk revival, indietronica
- Length: 51:20
- Label: Deltasonic
- Producer: Jonny Dollar: Craig Silvey

The Longcut chronology
The Longcut EP (2006)	A Call And Response (2006)	Open Hearts (2009)

Singles from A Call and Response
- 1. "Vitamin C" Released: July 12, 2006; 2. "A Tried And Tested Method" Released: October 2, 2006

A Call And Response is the debut album by British indie rock band The Longcut, released in the UK on June 12th, 2006 through Deltasonic Records.

== Background ==
Previously, The Longcut released the extended plays “Transition” on November 29th, 2004 and “A Quiet Life” on June 13th, 2005. A self-titled EP that combined the two soon followed up. The EP also featured the song “DVT” on Australian versions.

After the album’s release, the band put out the singles “Vitamin C” and “A Tried And Tested Method” on July 12th and on October 2nd of the same year, with the latter peaking at 76 on the UK’s physical singles chart for one week. Music videos were filmed for “Transition”, “A Quiet Life”, “Vitamin C”, and “A Tried And Tested Method”. The music video for A Tried and Tested Method was put up for vote on MTV2’s site for the NME Chart Show and was even featured on the top ten list.

Songs from the album aired on British radio station, Xfm as well as BBC Radio 6. Steve Lamacq would also make A Call And Response one of his records of the week. NME ranked the album at number 19 on the top albums of 2006.

== Production ==
Professional ratings
Review scores
Source	Rating
Allmusic	3/5 stars
Yahoo! Music	7/10
Pitchfork	7.6/10
The Guardian	4/5 stars 2/5 stars
MusicOMH	3/5 stars
BBC	Positive
Sputnikmusic	Positive

In the summer of 2005, the band would begin to work on their debut album. Writing consisted of playing live with three or four keyboards on loop before layering on guitars and drums, then adding vocals in post. “A lot of pointless jamming goes on in our rehearsal room, but making sense out of all the chaos is a great feeling”, says Ogilvie. Recording was split between Townhouse Studios, Konk Studios, and Mayfair Studios in London as well as Parkgate Studios in Sussex, with Jonny Dollar and Craig Silvey at the helm. The recording process went by quickly and work was finished in si weeks by October of the same year. The band initially joked about asking Dave Sitek (of TV On The Radio and Yeah Yeah Yeahs fame) to help with mixing, but they weren't sure if he was already busy at the time. Sitek originally knew nothing of the band but enjoyed the work that the band later sent to him.

Mixing took marginally longer time than recording and was done while the band was on tour around the United Kingdom, United States, and Japan. Initially, Silvey mixed the album but the band described his style as too “clinical” and went with Sitek’s “dirtier” sound instead. The Longcut themselves were also heavily involved in mixing and producing.

“The Kiss Off” and “A Tried And Tested Method” would be the first songs recorded in May of 2005 at the Townhouse, the latter of which ending up as a single. Many songs had both working and final titles taken from magazine headlines. In late August, “Spires” and “Gravity In Crisis” would be recorded with “Transition” soon proceeding. In between recording their songs, the band also played new material live to tease the upcoming tracks.

== Musical style and influence ==
Many comparisons between The Longcut and other acts such as Joy Division, New Order, and The Rapture were made due to their minimal compositions and reverberated instruments. The band wanted to capture the energy of a live performance while layering textural soundscapes. Ogilvie would explain that their music is more about the band’s attitude than a specific style stating “we try not to do anything half-arsed basically. I think that’s the most important thing about recording and everything.”

== Reception ==
The album’s reception was generally positive but it also received multiple mixed reviews. Pitchfork praised the band for their restraint and usage of dynamics commenting that “they nail dynamics as only bands who've sweat buckets together can”, and “the details The Longcut struggle over are more felt than heard, the band's tools-at-hand simpler and less predictable.” The BBC’s review was particularly appraisal citing that The Longcut was “the most exciting band” of the last decade produced by Manchester.

Common criticisms were that each song meanders and drags. Leonie Cooper of the guardian would compare the album to “elevator music” while Sarah Boden of the same publication would call it “dark” and “euphoric”. MusicOMH praised the album for its atmospherics but also went on to say “lack of variation could be an accusation levelled against them”.

== Track listing ==
No.	Title	Length
1.	"A Last Act of Desperate Men"	6:49
2.	"Gravity in Crisis"	5:17
3.	"Transition"	4:32
4.	"Holy Funk"	4:03
5.	"A Tried and Tested Method"	3:52
6.	"A Quiet Life"	4:46
7.	"The Kiss Off"	6:26
8.	"Lonesome No More!"	5:00
9.	"Vitamin C"	5:33
10.	"Spires"	4:57
Total length:		51:20

Japanese bonus track
No.	Title	Length
1.	"Idiot Check"	4:55

== Personnel ==
=== The Longcut ===
- Stuart Ogilvie – lead vocals, drums, keyboards
- Lee Gale – guitar
- Jon Fearon – bass

=== Technical ===
- Jonny Dollar, Craig Silvey – production, recording
- Craig Silvey – engineering
- Simon Wakeling – engineering assistant (at Parkgate Studios, Sussex)
- Rich Robinson – pro-tools engineering
- Dave Sitek, Chris Coady – mixing (at Staygold studios, Brooklyn)
- Steve Fallone – mastering (at Sterling Sound, New York City)
- Liam Palmer – artwork
- Mark James – design
- Giles Hatton, Tom Knott – production, engineering (“You Are Nothing Without Your Robot Car”)
- The Longcut – mixing
