= Modus Operandi (Photek album) =

Studio album by Photek
- Released: 9 September 1997
- Genre: Drum and bass
- Length: 70:12
- Label: Astralwerks
- Producer: Photek

Photek chronology
Risc vs. Reward (1997)	Modus Operandi (1997)	Form & Function (1998)

Professional ratings
Review scores
Source	Rating
AllMusic	3.5/5 stars
The Guardian	4/5 stars
Muzik	9/10
NME	7/10
Pitchfork	9.3/10 (1997); 8.8/10 (2024)
Rolling Stone	3.5/5 stars

Modus Operandi is the debut studio album by British drum and bass artist Photek. It was released on 9 September 1997 on the Virgin Records sublabel Science in Europe and on Astralwerks in the US.

In 2012, Fact placed it at number 81 on its list of the "100 Best Albums of the 1990s". In 2013, Spin named it one of the 20 best Astralwerks albums.

== Track listing ==
Modus Operandi track listing
No.	Title	Length
1.	"The Hidden Camera"	6:48
2.	"Smoke Rings"	6:27
3.	"Minotaur"	5:20
4.	"Aleph 1"	8:40
5.	"124"	6:59
6.	"Axiom"	6:01
7.	"Trans 7"	7:50
8.	"Modus Operandi"	7:04
9.	"KJZ"	7:48
10.	"The Fifth Column"	7:09

== Charts ==
Chart performance for Modus Operandi
Chart (1997)	Peak position
Scottish Albums (OCC)	87
Swedish Albums (Sverigetopplistan)	51
UK Albums (OCC)	30
