= Solaris (Photek album) =

Studio album by Photek
- Released: 19 September 2000
- Genre: Acid house, minimal techno, drum and bass, ambient
- Length: 55:09
- Label: Astralwerks
- Producer: Rupert Parkes

Photek chronology
Form & Function (1998)	Solaris (2000)	Form & Function Vol. 2 (2007)

Professional ratings
Review scores
Source	Rating
AllMusic	4/5 stars
The Encyclopedia of Popular Music	3/5 stars
Pitchfork Media	2.0/10
Rolling Stone	3.5/5 stars
Spin	8/10

Solaris is an album by the British drum and bass artist Photek, released in 2000. It was released on 19 September 2000 on the Virgin Records sublabel Science in Europe and on Astralwerks in the US.

== Production ==
Rupert Parkes produced Solaris, trading in the drum and bass sound of the previous album in favor of techno and house influences.

== Reception ==
According to Metacritic. the album received a MetaScore of 70, meaning generally favorable reviews, based on 10 professional reviews. Metacritic ranked Solaris the 95th Best Album of 2000.

== Track listing ==
1. "Terminus" – 5:26
2. "Junk" – 5:27
3. "Glamourama" – 5:30
4. "Mine to Give" – 6:41
  - featuring Robert Owens (vocals)
5. "Can't Come Down" – 6:59
  - featuring Robert Owens (vocals)
6. "Infinity" – 8:31
7. "Solaris" – 5:12
8. "Aura" – 0:47
9. "Halogen" – 4:38
10. "Lost Blue Heaven" – 3:13
11. "Under the Palms" – 2:37
