= Source Direct =

English drum and bass group

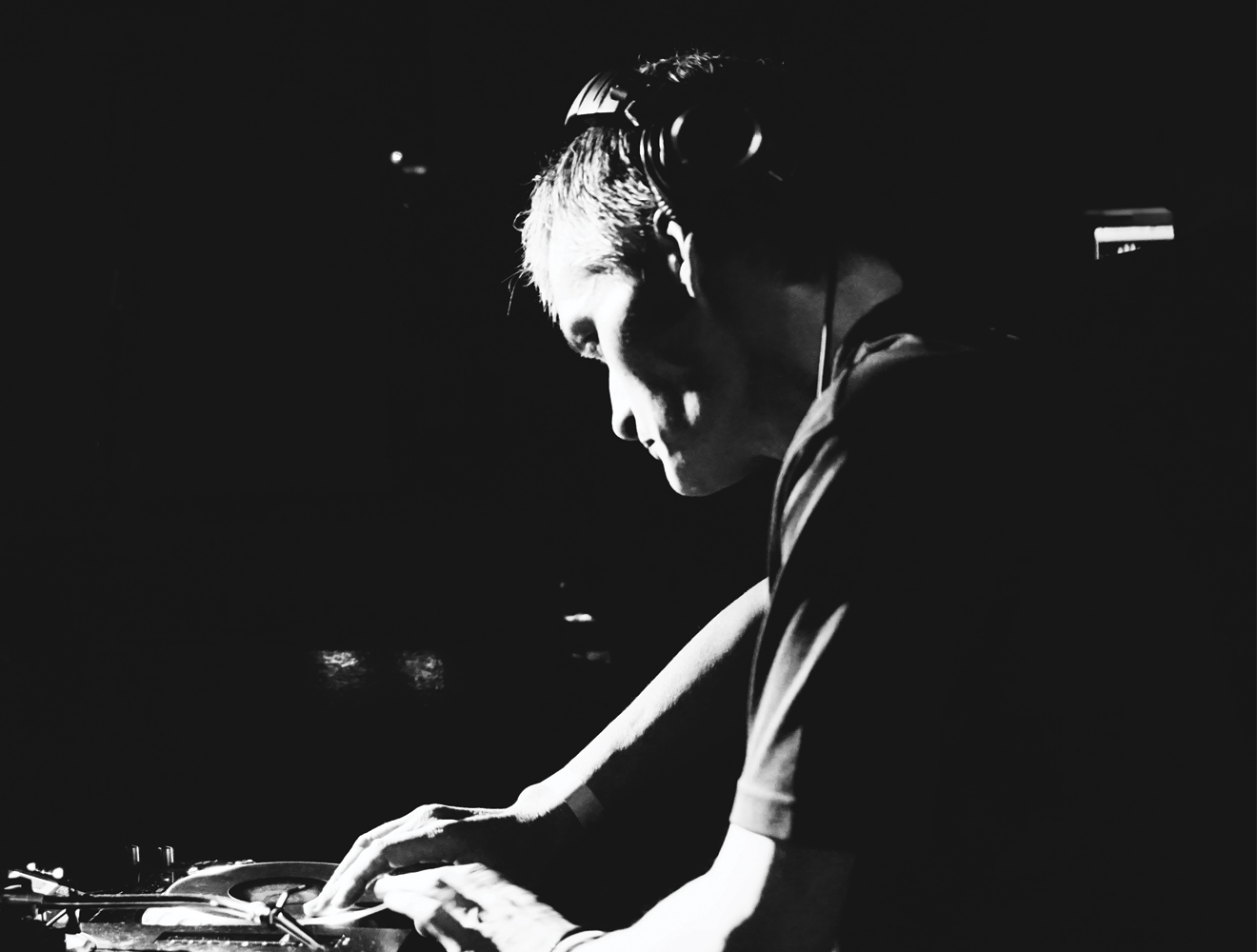

Background information
- Also known as: Intensity; Sounds of Life; Oblivion; Mirage; X-Files; Hokusai
- Origin: St Albans, Hertfordshire, England
- Genres: Drum and bass; jungle; breakbeat
- Years active: 1994–2001, 2014–present
- Labels: Metalheadz; Good Looking Records; Virgin Records; Astralwerks; Source Direct Recordings
- Members: James Baker
- Past members: Phil Aslett
- Website: sourcedirectrecordings.com

Source Direct is an English drum and bass act from St Albans, Hertfordshire, England. Source Direct have released an EP, Controlled Developments (1997), an album, Exorcise the Demons (1999), and numerous singles, under both the Source Direct name and a number of aliases.

Originally Source Direct consisted of James Baker and Phil Aslett, later becoming a solo project of Baker's in 1999.

== History ==
Originally the act consisted of two childhood friends, James Baker and Phil Aslett. Due to differences between the pair, however, it became entirely a solo project of Baker's in 1999, after the release of Exorcise the Demons.

Source Direct's music uses complex and irregular breakbeats, snappy and precise hi-hats, dark atmospheric sampling and abstract song structures.

Source Direct have released music on a variety of record labels: Metalheadz, Science (Virgin Records), Good Looking Records, Astralwerks, Basement, Certificate 18, Odysee, Street Beats and the self-owned Source Direct Recordings. They have released singles under the names Intensity, Sounds of Life, Oblivion, Mirage, X-Files and Hokusai.

Despite not being featured on the officially released soundtrack, Source Direct gained recognition for the track "Call & Response" which was used in the horror movie Blade. The track, originally a single, was later included on their EP Controlled Developments, and on their album Exorcise the Demons. Source Direct contributed the track "2097" to the CD soundtrack of the PlayStation game Wipeout 2097, released in 1996.

Fact included Exorcise the Demons in its "The 100 Best Albums of the 1990s".

== Discography ==
=== Albums and EPs ===
- Controlled Developments (1997, Astralwerks) – 6-track EP
- Exorcise the Demons (1999, Virgin Records)

=== Singles ===
- "Future London/Shimmer" (1994, Odysee)
- "A Made Up Sound/The Cult" (1995, Metalheadz)
- "Approach & Identify/Modem" (1995, Source Direct)
- "Different Groove/Stars" (1995, Odysee)
- "Fabric of Space/Bliss" (1995, Source Direct)
- "Snake Style/Exit 9" (1995, Source Direct)
- "Black Rose/12 Til 4" (1996, Source Direct)
- "Stonekiller/Web of Sin" (1996, Metalheadz)
- "Secret Liaison/Complexities" (1996, Good Looking Records)
- "The Crane/Artificial Barriers" (1996, Source Direct)
- "Call & Response/Computer State" (1997, Virgin)
- "Capital D/Enemy Lines" (1997, Virgin)
- "Two Masks/Black Domina" (1997, Virgin)
- "Concealed Identity" (1998, Virgin)
- "Mind Weaver" (1998, Virgin)
- "Technical Warfare" (1998, Virgin)
- "Snowblind/The Place" (2001, Demonic)
- "Sub One/Escape From Cairo" (2001, Demonic)
- "Yo Bitch!/Pimp Star" (2001, Demonic)
