= LTJ Bukem =

British musician, producer and DJ

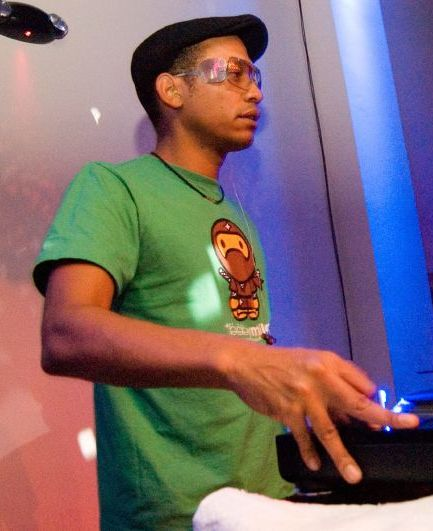
- LTJ Bukem in 2006

Background information
- Also known as: The Bookworm, Apollo Two
- Born: Daniel Andrew Williamson; 20 September 1967 (age 59); Watford, England
- Genres: Jungle; Drum and bass; jazzstep; breakbeat hardcore; breakbeat; intelligent drum and bass; trip hop; neo soul; funk
- Occupations: DJ, record producer
- Labels: Good Looking Records, Looking Good, Cookin', Earth series

Daniel Andrew Williamson (born 20 September 1967), better known as LTJ Bukem (/ˈbʊkəm/), is a British jungle musician, producer and DJ. He and his record label Good Looking are most associated with the jazzy, atmospheric side of Jungle music.

== Early life ==
Daniel Williamson was adopted from birth. In 2007, he revealed that he had found his biological birth mother, a Ugandan woman living in Paris. She told him that his father was Egyptian.

== Career ==
LTJ Bukem was trained as a classical pianist and discovered jazz fusion in his teenage years, having a jazz funk band at one stage. By the late 1980s, he decided to become a DJ and gained fame in the rave scene of the early 1990s. The "Bukem" portion of his stage name came from his nickname "Book 'em" which derived from the TV show Hawaii Five-O where the character Steve McGarrett would say "Book 'em, Danno" when someone was arrested. The "LTJ" portion doesn't stand for anything. As a producer, he released a series of drum and bass tracks such as "Logical Progression" (1991), "Demon's Theme" (1992), "Atlantis" and "Music" (1993). His most notable release was the track "Horizons" (1995) which attained considerable popularity, using the main melody from Lemon Sol's song "Sunflash".

He then dipped in visibility as a producer, with his work running the London night club Speed and his record label Good Looking Records, coming to the fore. A series of compilations entitled Logical Progression highlighted a jazz and ambient influenced side of drum and bass; the style became widely known as intelligent drum and bass. Bukem also explored the downtempo end of electronic lounge music, with sister label Cookin' and the Earth series of compilations. Some of the artists who rose to fame under Good Looking in this period include Blame, Seba, Big Bud, Blu Mar Ten, DJ Dream (Aslan Davis), Future Engineers, Tayla, Aquarius (an alias of Photek), Peshay, Source Direct and Artemis.

On 16 July 1995, he did an Essential Mix alongside MC Conrad. In 1997, he remixed the James Bond theme for David Arnold's concept album of James Bond music Shaken and Stirred: The David Arnold James Bond Project. In 2000, he finally released a debut solo album, the double-CD Journey Inwards. The album heavily emphasised his jazz fusion influences. 2001 saw a remix of Herbie Hancock.

He ran the Speed nightclub in London with fellow drum and bass DJ Fabio.

He DJs extensively around the world, often under the 'Progression Sessions' or 'Bukem in Session' banners. However, his former companion and vocalist, MC Conrad left the label and ultimately their musical partnership in 2012.

== Style and influences ==
Viewed as an innovator in the drum and bass style, Bukem is known for developing an accessible alternative to that hardcore genre's speedy, assaultive energies. His style pays homage to the Detroit-based sound of early techno, but Bukem also incorporates still earlier influences, particularly the mellow, melodic sonorities of 1970s era jazz fusion as exemplified by Lonnie Liston Smith and Roy Ayers. Early in his career, Bukem was identified for his response to the "almost paranoid hyperkinesis" of breakbeat-based house music, and specifically for his reservations regarding the overbearing force of the hardcore mentality.

Bukem's music from the early 1990s onward represents his efforts to map out an alternative future for drum and bass by incorporating softer-edged influences culled from London's 1980s rare groove and acid jazz scenes. Music on Logical Progression reveals these influences, as does his approach on 1993's Music / Enchanted, which features string arrangements and sounds from nature. His use of keyboards, live vocals and slow-motion breaks on these and future releases earned Bukem's music the tag intelligent drum and bass. While this designation caused controversy within the drum and bass community, it also influenced the popularisation of hardcore music in the UK during the mid-1990s.

== Discography ==
=== Albums ===
- Journey Inwards (2000)

=== Compilations/mixes ===
- Mixmag Live! Volume 21 (MixMag, 1996)
- Logical Progression Vols 1–4 (1996–2001)
- Earth Vols 1–7 (1996–2004)
- Progression Sessions Vols 1–10 (1998–2004)
- Producer 01 (2001)
- Producer 05: Rarities (2002)
- Some Blue Notes of Drum 'N Bass (2004)
- FabricLive.46 (2009)
- Bukem in Session (2013)

=== Singles/EPs ===
- "Delitefol" (1991)
- "Logical Progression" (1991)
- "Teach Me to Fly" (with DJ Trace) (1992)
- "Demon's Theme / A Couple of Beats" (1992)
- Who Knows Vol 1 (as the Bookworm) (1993)
- "Bang the Drums / Remnants" (with Tayla) (1993)
- "Return to Atlantis" (with Apollo Two) (1993)
- "Music / Enchanted" (1993)
- "Atmospherical Jubilancy" (1993)
- "19.5" (with Peshay) (1994)
- "Horizons" (1995)
- "The Journey" (with Mystic Moods) (1996)
- Mystical Realms EP (1998)
- Suspended Space EP (2000)
- "Switch" (2008)
- “Flip The Narrative” (2021)

=== Remixes ===
- "Sweetness (Mellow Drum n Bass Mix)" – Michelle Gayle (1994)
- "Feenin' (LTJ Bukem Remix)" – Jodeci (1995)
- "Transamazonia (LTJ Bukem Remix)" – The Shamen (1995)
- "If I Could Fly (LTJ Bukem Remix)" – Grace (1996)
- "The James Bond Theme (LTJ Bukem Remix)" – David Arnold (1997)
- "The Essence (LTJ Bukem Remix)" – Herbie Hancock (with Chaka Khan) (2001)
- "Homecoming (LTJ Bukem Remix)" – Above & Beyond (2021)
