= Seba (musician) =

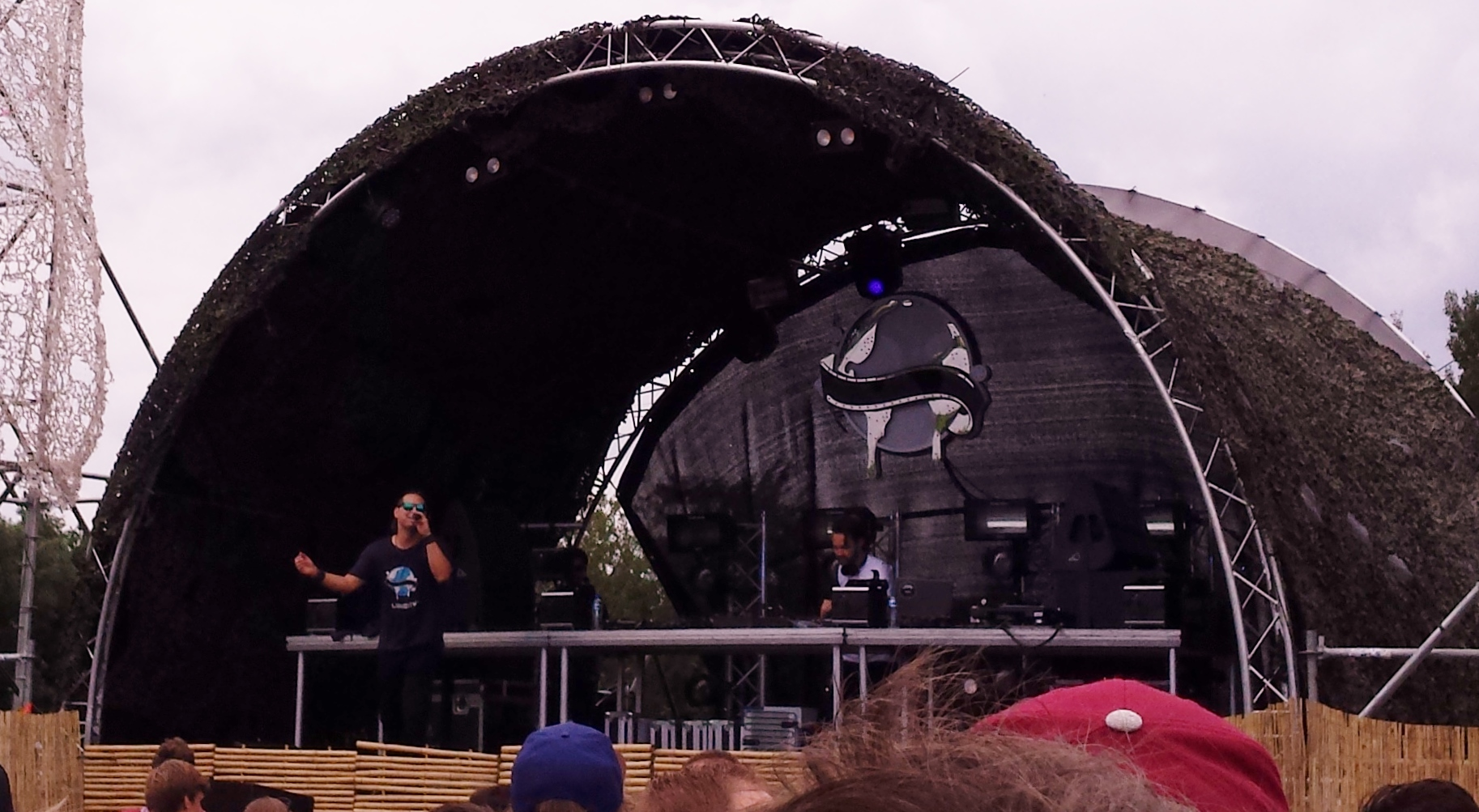
- Seba (right) performing at Liquicity Festival 2015

Background information
- Also known as: Forme
- Born: Sebastian Ahrenberg
- Origin: Sweden
- Genres: Drum and bass
- Occupations: Record producer; DJ; musician
- Years active: 1996–present
- Label: Secret Operations

Sebastian Ahrenberg, better known as Seba is a Swedish drum and bass producer and DJ. Seba is also the owner of Secret Operations, a drum and bass record label.

== Musical career ==
Seba's first professional release was Sonic Winds, a collaboration with Lo-tek on LTJ Bukem's Good Looking Records in 1996. The duo released Universal Music on Good Looking, after which Seba went on to produce a string of solo releases on various Bukem-owned labels.

=== Secret Operations ===
In 1997 Seba created a night club named Secret Operations in the basement club Tuben in central Stockholm. Two years later Operations released Case One, a CD compilation of works by Seba (under the pseudonym Forme) and other artists.

=== Svek ===
From 1999 to 2003, Ahrenberg has released a number of mostly house music works on the Swedish Svek label attributed to Seba and Forme. He has also joined with Jesper Dahlbäck (aka Lenk) for the collaborative house music effort known as Sunday Brunch. The two would release a number of tunes on vinyl as well as full-length CD entitled No Resistance in 2002.

=== Return to drum and bass ===
In 2002, Seba began releasing drum and bass records again. For the first time on his own Secret Operations label as well as various others. While no longer under Bukem's eye, Seba's music retained its deep atmospheric sound while sometimes adding a more aggressive edge not often heard in his earlier works. Operations first release was Pieces, a collaboration between Seba, Lenk and an uncredited Robert Manos as vocalist. Manos had previously recorded with the duo for Sunday Brunch, but this was the first of many times he would join Ahrenberg on a drum and bass project.

=== Sebadox era ===
In 2004 Seba joined forces with drumfunk all-star Paradox, and the two put out a large number of albums from 2004 to 2006, with 2005 seeing an especially large amount of releases. A compilation of their work during this time was released on the CD Beats Me in 2006. Vocalist Robert Manos also contributed his talents to a number of works during this time frame.

== Selected discography ==
=== Studio albums ===
- Producer 6 (2003)
- Beats Me (& Paradox) (2006)
- Return to Forever (2008)
- Identity (2013)
- Ingaro (2022)
- Oni (2024)

=== Singles and EPs ===
- Seba & Lo-tek - Sonic Winds / So Long - 1996
- Seba & Lo-tek - Universal Music - 1997
- Seba - Connected / Catch the Moment - 1998
- Seba - Planetary Funk Alert / Camouflage - 1998
- Seba - Valley of the Moomins - 1998
- Seba - Waveform / Soul 2000 - 1999
- Sunday Brunch - Honung - 1999
- Sunday Brunch - After the Rain - 2000
- Seba & Lenk - Pieces - 2002
- Seba - Make My Way Home - 2003
- Seba & Lenk (featuring Robert Manos) - 16 Stories - 2004
- Seba & Paradox - You Didn't See It Did You? - 2004
- Seba & Paradox (featuring Robert Manos) - Move On - 2005
- Seba & Paradox (featuring Robert Manos) - Last Goodbye - 2005
- Seba - Forever - 2006
- Seba (featuring Robert Manos) - Heaven Sent - 2006
- Seba & Krazy - Nebula - 2007
- Seba - Return To Forever - 2008
- Seba & Kirsty Hawkshaw - The Joy (Face to Face) - 2010
- Seba - Welcome To Our World - 2011
- Seba - Identity - 2013
