= Photek =

English composer, producer, and DJ (born 1971)

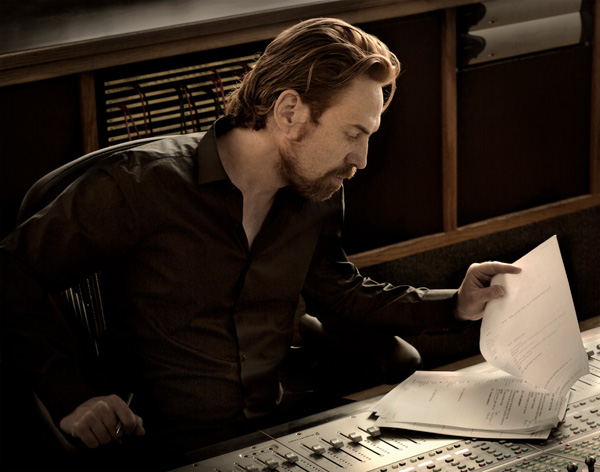

Background information
- Also known as: Photek; Studio Pressure; The Sentinel; Aquarius; Special Forces; Code of Practice; The Truper; System Ex
- Born: Rupert Parkes; 6 September 1971 (age 55); St Albans, England
- Genres: Drum and bass; downtempo; deep house
- Occupations: Record producer; DJ; film score composer
- Years active: 1992–present
- Labels: Virgin; Photek; Good Looking Records; Sanctuary; !K7; Metalheadz; Entity Records; Tectonic

Rupert Parkes (born 6 September 1971), known as Photek, is a Los Angeles-based British electronic music DJ/record producer, and TV and film score composer. Photek was born and raised in St Albans, England.

Photek has contributed music to several film, TV and video game productions, such as Blade in 1998. He also scored the show Gang Related with director Allen Hughes.

He received three consecutive Grammy Award nominations in the category of Best Remixed Recording, Non-Classical for Daft Punk's "End of Line" from the Tron: Legacy movie soundtrack in 2012, Moby's "Lie Down in Darkness" in 2013 and One Love/People Get Ready" in 2014.

Photek composed the TV score for the show How to Get Away with Murder.

== Biography ==
=== Education ===
Initially interested in hip hop, Parkes expanded his style with elements of soul and jazz. His first instrument was a tenor saxophone, but when a piano arrived in the family home his focus shifted to composition as opposed to performance. By 1992, he had switched from the saxophone to a sequencer. Within the next year he started to perform under the stage name Photek.

=== Early career 1993–1999 ===
Parkes began his first forays into releasing music in 1993 under a plethora of different names. Some of the early releases include the jungle-styled tracks "Jump" under the name Studio Pressure on Certificate 18, 'Dolphin Tune' under the name Aquarius on LTJ Bukem's Good Looking Records and 'Pulse Of Life' under the name The Sentinel on Basement Records. The first release under the Photek production name came in 1994 with Touching Down... Planet Photek, released on his own Photek label. Photek's breakthrough release in 1995 was the Natural Born Killa drum'n'bass EP for Goldie's Metalheadz. In 1996, Photek contributed one track on the Wipeout 2097/Wipeout XL soundtracks.

Photek's debut album was Modus Operandi in 1997, through Virgin Records. In 1997, Virgin Records released Photek's "Ni Ten Ichi Ryu". A year later, Photek released his second album Form & Function. The album comprised four tracks that had previously only been available on limited release vinyl in the early 1990s, plus six remixes and versions by Photek himself as well as other contemporaries Digital, Peshay & Decoder, Doc Scott, and J Majik.

=== 2000–2012 ===
In 2000, Photek released his Solaris album, turning his attention from drum and bass to Chicago house and minimal techno. On the single "Mine to Give", he collaborated with Robert Owens to create a No. 1 Billboard single.

"One Nation" – the dubplate that had been available as a white label record for over a decade, saw an official release on Form & Function Vol. 2. The newer productions on the album showed Photek using a broader sound palette, taking influence from his composition and soundtrack work by including orchestrated passages. There are references to a more rock and industrial sound.

After a four-year hiatus from releasing music under the Photek moniker, Parkes produced a series of EPs in 2011. He was invited to contribute to BBC Radio 1's 'Essential Mix' series in October 2012. In the same year, Parkes released the album KU: PALM.

=== Grammy nominations ===
Photek's remix of Daft Punk's "End of Line" for the Disney movie Tron: Legacy earned him a Grammy nomination for Best Remix in 2012. He received Grammy nominations in the same category for the following 2 years, with remixes for Moby and Bob Marley.

=== Recent activities ===
Now based in Los Angeles, Photek scored the second season of ABC's How to Get Away with Murder in fall of 2015, and continued recording of the follow-up to KU:PALM and various movie and computer game scoring projects. More recently in 2023, he composed the Season 5 Music for Call of Duty Modern Warfare II.

== Remixes ==
Photek has remixed many artists in his career such as David Bowie, Björk and Goldie. Additional production work on the Nine Inch Nails album With Teeth led to his remix of their track, "The Hand That Feeds", which got him KROQ daytime rotation.

== Personal life ==
Photek has been married to actress Stephanie Chao since 2012. They have two children.

== Discography ==
- Modus Operandi (1997)
- Form & Function (1998)
- Solaris (2000)
- Form & Function Vol. 2 (2007)
- KU:PALM (2012)

== Awards and nominations ==
- ASCAP Film & Television Awards 2015 – Original Score for 2014 Top Television Series for How to Get Away with Murder
- BMI Film & TV Awards 2015 – Network Television Music Awards 2015 for How to Get Away with Murder
- 54th Grammy Awards (2012) – nominated for Best Remixed Recording, Non-Classical for "End of Line" (Photek Remix) by Daft Punk
- 55th Grammy Awards (2013) – nominated for Best Remixed Recording, Non-Classical for "Lie Down in Darkness" (Photek Remix) by Moby
- 56th Grammy Awards (2014) – nominated for Best Remixed Recording, Non-Classical for "One Love/People Get Ready" (Photek Remix) by Bob Marley & The Wailers
