= Peshay =

British music producer and DJ

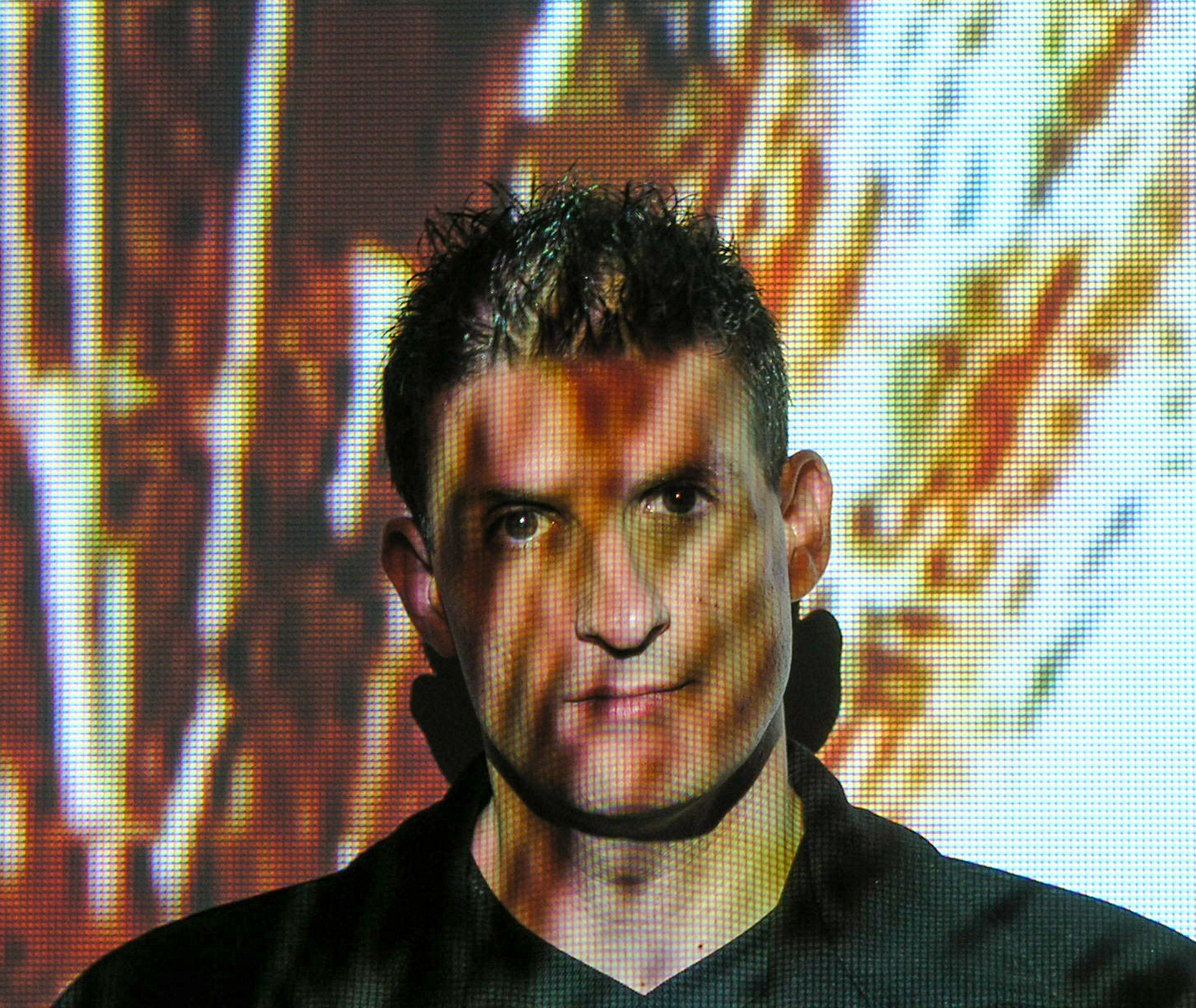

Background information
- Also known as: The Peshay · Beyond the Future · 5th Assassin · Outer Limits · Revelation · Secrets
- Born: Paul Pesce; 18 December 1970 (age 55); London, England
- Genres: Drum and bass · house
- Occupation: Record producer · DJ · remixer
- Instrument: Synthesiser · softsynth · turntables · drum machine · sequencer · sampler · laptop
- Years active: 1992–present
- Label: FFRR · Island · Mo' Wax · Good Looking · Metalheadz · Reinforced · Infrared Records · Cubik · Peshay Music
- Website: peshay.com

Paul Pesce (born 18 December 1970), better known as Peshay, is a British drum and bass and electronic music producer and DJ.

== Early life ==
Peshay is of British and Italian heritage. His first introduction to music was at an early age through his mother who was a well regarded classical singer. He is described as a music obsessive from an early age with interests in jazz, funk, soul and early electro and hip-hop. Although he is widely regarded as an influential music producer, he is also regarded as a groundbreaking DJ having been behind the turntables from as early as 13 years of age.

== Music career ==
Peshay began to come to prominence in the early 1990s, playing at East London raves and releasing classic tracks on Reinforced Records, Good Looking Records, and Metalheadz such as Protege EP, 19:5, Piano Tune/Vocal Tune, and Psychosis/Represent. In the mid-1990s, he would play at the seminal 'Metalheadz at the Blue Note' nights.

In 1995 at the peak of drum and bass being recognised by the mainstream media, Peshay suffered an accident that left him almost bed-bound for two years.

His early releases are often referenced as groundbreaking for his unique production techniques and pioneering use of samples and effects. He is also highly regarded for his early use of live musicians and instruments in pursuit of pushing his music forward. His releases are also considered to be timeless pieces of music that have gone on to inspire future generations of producers from all electronic musical disciplines. In particular, prominent early releases such as Psychosis, Piano Tune, On The Nile and Vocal Tune are often cited by peers and press as some of the most highly influential within the genre.

In 1999, he released the critically acclaimed jazz-influenced album Miles From Home on Island Records. This was followed up in 2002 with his disco-inspired album Fuzion, which spawned the single You Got Me Burning. A further album Jammin' was released in 2004.

In 2000, Peshay was asked by Red Bull Music Academy to present a lecture on music production, Djing and the music industry in Dublin, Ireland.

In 2001, he was nominated for and won Best Drum and Bass DJ at the DJ Awards ceremony held annually in Ibiza, Spain.

In 2013, he released a live jazz-funk and soul album on the Tru Thoughts record label named Generation. The widely acclaimed album was written, produced and composed by Peshay.

Peshay's seminal remix of Inner City Life was given a new lease of life in 2020, being released as exclusive content to celebrate the 25 year anniversary of Goldie's drum and bass album Timeless.

Peshay launched his own record label Peshay Music in 2019. The vision for the new label is to produce a wide spectrum of music and electronic music. The tracks released will feature live instruments all composed by Peshay allowing him to express his creativity as a composer and a producer across multiple and diverse musical genres.

== Discography ==
=== Albums ===
| Year | Release | Label |
|---|---|---|
| 1999 | Miles from Home | Island Records |
| 2002 | Fuzion | Cubik |
| 2004 | Jammin | Cubik |
| 2013 | Generation | Tru Thoughts |
| 2018 | Reflections | De:Tuned |
| 2019 | Underground Vol. 1 | Peshay Music |
| 2023 | Underground Vol. 2 | Peshay Music |

=== Selected singles/EPs ===
| Year | Release | Label |
|---|---|---|
| 1993 | "Rude" (with Dave Charlsworth) | |
| 1993 | "2 Dope" | Brain Records |
| 1993 | Protege EP | Reinforced Records |
| 1993 | "Warped" (as Beyond the Future) | Paradise |
| 1994 | "Psychosis/Represent" | Metalheadz |
| 1994 | "19.5" with LTJ Bukem | Good Looking Records |
| 1994 | "Piano Tune/Vocal Tune" | Good Looking Records |
| 1995 | "Futurama / Endless Thoughts" | Basement Records |
| 1995 | "On the War Path" | Street Beats |
| 1996 | "Jah VIP Rollers Mix" | Razors Edge |
| 1996 | "Music Rework" | Nexus Records |
| 1996 | "Headz 2" | Mo Wax |
| 1998 | "Miles from Home" | Mo' Wax |
| 1999 | "Truly" | Island Blue |
| 1999 | "Switch" | Island Blue |
| 2000 | "Lethal (Volume 1) vs Special Forces" | Photek Productions |
| 2002 | "You Got Me Burning" | Cubik |
| 2002 | "Satisfy My Love" | Cubik |
| 2004 | "Ronaldo" | Cubik |
| 2005 | "Buzz/Atlantis" | Cubik |
| 2011 | "Solina/How We Used to Live" | V Records |
| 2013 | Funkster EP | V Recordings |
| 2013 | Generation EP | Tru Thoughts |
| 2014 | Vanguard EP | Tru Thoughts |
| 2019 | "Angels & Demons" | Infrared |
| 2019 | "Face Peel/After Dark" | Peshay Music |
| 2019 | "Let It Go/Infinity" | Peshay Music |
| 2020 | "Warpizm" | Peshay Music |
| 2023 | "Brighter Days" | Peshay Music |

=== Mixes/compilations ===
| Year | Release | Label |
|---|---|---|
| 1997 | Promised Land Volume 3 | Higher Limits |
| 2001 | Renegades of Funk | Renegade |
| 2007/2008 | Inside Cubik | Caramelle Recordings / ZYX Music |

== Awards and nominations ==
DJ Awards

| Year | Nominee / work | Award | Result |
|---|---|---|---|
| 2001 | Peshay | Best Drum 'N' Bass & Beats DJ | Won |
