= Good Looking Records =

UK record label

- Founded: 1991
- Founder: LTJ Bukem
- Genre: Drum and bass; jungle
- Country of origin: United Kingdom
- Location: Watford

Good Looking Records is a jungle and drum and bass record label, founded in 1991 by producer LTJ Bukem. The label specialises in jazz-influenced and atmospheric intelligent drum & bass.

== Overview ==
Following the label's mid-2000s hiatus, all 12" singles issued were housed in a plain grey card sleeve with the label's logo on the front cover.

Some of the label's drum & bass releases went under the banner of "Looking Good Records". These featured nearly identical sleeves, the only difference being the yellow spine of the Good Looking releases and the royal blue design of the Looking Good records.

Artists who have released on this label include LTJ Bukem, Blame, Photek, Blu Mar Ten, Seba, Source Direct, Makoto, Q Project, and Peshay.

== History ==
By 1990, the dance music genres of house and acid house had evolved into hardcore and breakbeat in the UK, with what was later referred to as "drum & bass" and "jungle" developing as offshoots. Initially mixing at raves, LTJ Bukem turned his hand to production, producing his first track "Demons Theme" in 1990. Bukem soon grew frustrated with the lack of control over his own recordings, so in 1991 he formed his own label Good Looking Records. Early Good Looking tracks like "Atlantis" and "Music" provided a soulful, melodic alternative to the prevailing hardcore tracks then in vogue.

By 1994, LTJ Bukem had formed his second label Looking Good Records and begun the formation of an artist collective including Peshay, Aquarius (a.k.a. Photek), Blu Mar Ten, Blame, Nookie & Tayla – similarly inclined towards melodicism and epic expanses of sound. Bukem also launched the club night Speed at the Mars Bar in London, in order to promote Good Looking's approach to sound. With Bukem & Fabio playing breakbeat records and MC Conrad providing vocals, it soon became one of the most popular clubs in London.

In 1996, the release of Logical Progression signaled Good Looking's commitment to the drum & bass and jungle community providing shelter for a unique band of producers. The same year, Good Looking introduced the Earth series of compilations. The Earth series showcased a range of mid-tempo musical styles from hip-hop, lounge, cosmic funk, future soul, jazz and house music. The most recent volume, Earth 7 featured a DVD with 5.1 DTS surround sound.

1998 saw the release of the first Progression Sessions mix CD. These live recordings captured the vibe of the Progression Sessions tours and residencies from around the world. The Progression Sessions series has documented the musical direction of Good Looking Records through the years and illustrated the live element brought to each event through the complementary pairing of Bukem's music and the vocals of MC Conrad.

Into the 2000s, Good Looking Records continued to release further Progression Sessions mix CDs, compilation CDs and vinyl. The latest wave of records were released in 2014.

== See also ==
- Moving Shadow
- Metalheadz
- Drum and bass
