= List of jungle and drum and bass artists =

This is a list of jungle and drum and bass artists/DJs. This includes notable artists who have either been very important to the genre or have had a considerable amount of exposure (such as those who have been on a major label). This list does not include little-known local artists. Artists are listed by the first letter of their pseudonym (not including the words "a", "an", or "the"), and individuals are listed by last name.

== 0–9 ==
- 4hero

== A ==
- AK1200
- Adam F
- Alex Reece
- Amon Tobin
- Andy C
- Aphex Twin
- Aphrodite
- Aquasky
- Audio

== B ==
- B-Complex
- Bachelors of Science
- Bad Company
- Billain
- Black Sun Empire
- Blame (music producer)
- Blu Mar Ten
- Blanke
- Blue Stahli
- Michiel van den Bos
- Boymerang
- Breakbeat Era
- Justin Broadrick
- Brookes Brothers
- Danny Byrd

== C ==
- Calibre
- Calyx
- Camo & Krooked
- Davide Carbone
- Cause 4 Concern
- Celldweller
- Chase & Status
- Commix
- Concord Dawn
- Corrupt Souls
- Counterstrike
- Crissy Criss
- Cui Jian
- Culture Shock
- Current Value

== D ==
- D.Kay
- DBridge
- DC Breaks
- Dimension
- DJ Craze
- DJ Dara
- DJ Dextrous
- DJ Die
- DJ Food
- DJ Fresh
- DJ Hazard
- DJ Hidden
- DJ Hype
- DJ Kentaro
- DJ Marky
- DJ Patife
- DJ Rap
- DJ Ron
- DJ SS
- DJ Starscream
- DJ Zinc
- Danny Breaks
- Decoder
- DeeJay Delta
- Deekline
- Delta Heavy
- Demon Boyz
- Dieselboy
- Dillinja
- Dirtyphonics
- Dom & Roland
- Doubleclick
- Drumagick
- Drumsound & Bassline Smith
- Dwarf Electro

== E ==
- E-Z Rollers
- Eresse
- Etherwood
- Evol Intent
- Tim Exile
- Eye-D

== F ==
- Fabio
- The Flashbulb
- Foul Play
- Freaky Flow
- Friction
- Fred V & Grafix

== G ==
- Goldie
- The Glitch Mob
- Grooverider
- A Guy Called Gerald
- Gremlinz

== H ==
- High Contrast
- Hybrid
- Hedex

== I ==
- Ill.Skillz
- Ilk
- Imanu
- Ivy Lab

== J ==
- Jade
- J Majik
- John B
- Jonny L
- Jordana
- Jumpin Jack Frost

== K ==
- Keeno
- Ray Keith
- Kēvens
- Kemistry
- Kemistry & Storm
- Kenny Ken
- Kill the Noise
- Killbot
- Klute
- Konflict
- Kosheen
- Kove
- Koven
- Krust
- Kuuro

== L ==
- LTJ Bukem
- Lamb
- Left Spine Down
- Lenzman
- Limewax
- Liondub
- LiveSummit
- Loadstar
- Logistics
- London Elektricity (also released as Peter Nice Trio)
- Luude

== M ==
- Maduk
- Makoto
- Marcus Intalex
- Matrix
- MC Skibadee
- Metrik
- Michele Sainte
- Missrepresent
- Muzz

== N ==
- Nanotek
- Nerve
- Netsky
- Nia Archives
- Noisia
- Nucleus
- Nu:Logic
- Nu:Tone

== O ==
- Omni Trio
- Optical

== P ==
- PH10
- The Panacea
- Panda
- Paradox
- Pendulum
- Alix Perez
- Peshay
- Pete Cannon
- Phace
- Photek
- Plastikman
- Plug
- Podočnjaci
- Polar
- Pythius (producer)
- The Prodigy
- The Prototypes

== Q ==
- Q Project
- The Qemists
- Quoit

== R ==
- Rabbit Junk
- Ragga Twins
- Ram Trilogy
- Rawtekk
- Tim Reaper
- Rebel MC
- Red Snapper
- Alex Reece
- Renegade Soundwave
- Replicator
- Roni Size & Reprazent
- Rregula
- Rudimental
- Ed Rush

== S ==
- Michele Sainte
- Salmonella Dub
- Doc Scott
- Seba
- Shapeshifter
- Shimon
- The Shizit
- ShockOne
- Shy FX
- Si Begg
- Sigma
- Slipmatt
- Ed Solo
- Source Direct
- Spectrum
- Spor
- Spring Heel Jack
- S.P.Y
- Squarepusher
- Stamina MC
- Stanton Warriors
- State of Mind
- Fox Stevenson
- Stevie Hyper D
- Sub Focus
- Submerged
- System 7

== T ==
- T Power
- TC
- Tiki Taane
- Tabla Beat Science
- Nobukazu Takemura
- Teebee
- Soichi Terada
- Top Buzz
- Total Science
- Typecell

== U ==
- U-ziq

== V ==
- Vector Burn
- Venetian Snares
- Luke Vibert

== W ==
- Wagon Christ
- Danny Wheeler
- Wickaman
- Wilkinson
- Witchman

== X ==
- XRS
- Xample

== Z ==
- Zardonic
