= Substance D =

Compilation album (Mix)
- Released: (United States) May 6, 2008
- Genre: Drum and Bass, Hardstep, Darkstep
- Label: Human Imprint, System Recordings
- Compiler: Dieselboy

Dieselboy chronology
The Human Resource (2006)	Substance D (2008)

Substance D is a drum and bass compilation album mixed by Dieselboy. The first disc is mixed and the second disc is unmixed. The CD art was designed by Akira Takahashi (who also created the CD art for Dieselboy's "The 6ixth Session" and "The Dungeonmaster's Guide"). Substance D was released on May 6, 2008, and debuted at #21 on Billboard's Electronic Album Chart.

== Track listing ==
Disc One (mixed by Dieselboy)

1. Warning Label - Dieselboy & Ewun
2. Trauma/Cell (SPKTRM Duomix) - Demo
3. One of Them (Current Value Remix) - Limewax
4. Pressure Drop VIP - Technical Itch
5. The Calling (Evol Intent & Ewun Remix) - Technical Itch & Kemal
6. Death Sentence - Psidream
7. We Want Your Soul (Raiden Remix) - Freeland
8. Midnight Express - Dieselboy, Evol Intent, & Ewun
9. Machine March - SPKTRM
10. Fear/Machine (Demo Duomix) - Current Value
11. O.D. - Demo
12. SFX - The Upbeats
13. Timewarp VIP - Counterstrike
14. Paris (The Upbeats Remix) - MSTRKRFT
15. Load Rocket (Gridlok Remix) - Computer Club
16. Helter Skelter (Mayhem & Evol Intent Remix) - Meat Beat Manifesto
17. N/V/D (Counterstrike Zentraedi Remix) - Dieselboy

Disc Two (unmixed tracks)

1. Midnight Express - Dieselboy, Evol Intent, & Ewun
2. Pressure Wounds - Tetradin & Advance
3. Step Up - Friske & Perpetuum
4. Rail Gun - Demo & Cease
5. N/V/D (Counterstrike Zentraedi Remix) - Dieselboy
6. O.D. - Demo
7. The Big Pullback - Noah D
8. Machine March - SPKTRM
9. Load Rocket (Gridlok Remix) - Computer Club
10. Parallel Universe - Infiltrata & Define
11. Fatal - The Fix

== See also ==
- Dieselboy
- Human Imprint
- The 6ixth Session
- The Dungeonmaster's Guide
- The Human Resource
