= Nanotek =

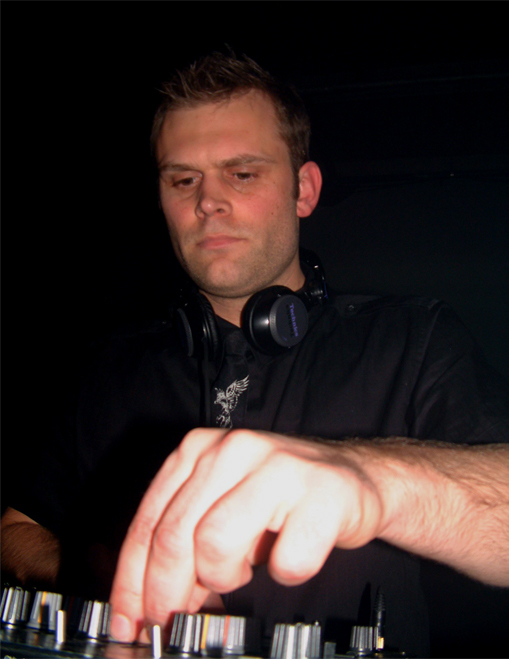
- Nanotek performing in Wellington, 2007

Background information
- Also known as: Cybakotic
- Born: Mark Christianson; Wellington, New Zealand
- Genres: Darkstep, drum and bass, dubstep, industrial
- Occupations: Producer, musician, DJ
- Years active: 2006–present
- Labels: Barcode Recordings; Counterstrike Recordings; Freak Recordings; Nanotek; PRSPCT Recordings; Subsistenz
- Website: www.nanotek666.com

Mark Christiansen, known professionally as Nanotek, is a New Zealand drum and bass and dubstep producer and DJ. Nanotek gained international recognition in 2007 with releases on darkstep labels such as Freak Recordings and Obscene Recordings. More recent projects include collaborations with artists such as Counterstrike, Current Value and Gein as well as Christiansen's first release on his self-titled label, Nanotek.

== Biography ==
Nanotek has been involved with music since his teenage years when he played guitar and drums in metal bands. In the mid 90s he discovered industrial and electronic music. Moving to Wellington in 2003, Christiansen was introduced to the sounds of Dom & Roland, Photek, and Dylan, which became key influences in his darkstep and hard sound.

During this period, he presented a regular prime time show on electronic music station Firm FM. An invitation from Wellington's Noise Enthusiast crew to headline their night 'Descend' was the first step that took Christiansen on to supporting DJs such as Tech Itch and Limewax.

His break came in late 2006 when Dylan, owner of Freak Recordings, signed two of his tracks, Acid Burn and Deadly Force, to his sister label Obscene Recordings.
This was a turning point for Christiansen, who gained international recognition from DJs such as Current Value, SPL, Limewax, B-Key, Tech Itch, Gein, and Counterstrike, as a result.

== Discography ==
=== Releases ===
- 2006: Nightwatch on Intransigent Digital
- 2007: Acid Burn / Deadly Force
- 2007: Fresh Hell on Freak Recordings
- 2007: The Vengeful on Intransigent Recordings
- 2007: Those Who Dwell Within on Intransigent Recordings
- 2009: Never Say Die / Angels of Truth
- 2009: Behemoth / Better Place on Tech Itch Records
- 2010: The Master with Gein on Guerilla Recordings
- 2010: Blackness with Counterstrike on Counterstrike Recordings
- 2011: Code of Chaos on Prspct Recordings
- 2011: Resurrection EP on Nanotek
- 2011: The Freak Obscene Days EP on Nanotek
