= AK1200 =

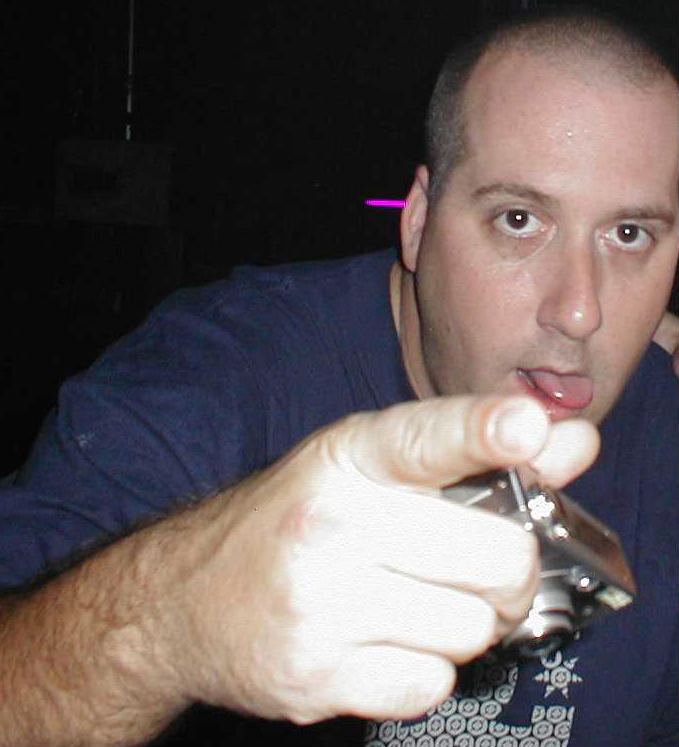
- AK1200 at a rave in Massachusetts

Background information
- Born: Dave Minner
- Origin: Orlando, Florida, U.S.
- Genre: Drum and bass
- Occupations: DJ, record producer
- Years active: 1989–present
- Labels: Breakbeat Science Recordings; Moving Shadow; Run
- Formerly of: Planet of the Drums
- Website: www.ak1200official.com

AK1200 is the stage name of Florida-based musician Dave Minner, who works in the jungle and drum and bass genres.

== Career ==
Minner produced his first record in 1993, when he did a remix of a Suburban Base Records track Somebody by Flex and Fats.

His debut album, SHOOTTOKILL, was co-produced with Rob Playford of Moving Shadow. In the US, AK1200 has been credited with helping to increase the popularity of jungle and D&B through his live performances and remixes, as well as for playing for free.

In 2000, he collaborated with Dieselboy and DJ Dara to create the annual Planet of the Drums tour.

== Selected discography ==
- 1996 Subbase Classics
- 1998 Fully Automatic
- 1999 Lock & Roll: A Drum & Bass DJ Mix
- 2000: Prepare for Assault
- 2001 Mixed Live: Moonshine Over America, San Francisco
- 2002 Shoot to Kill
- 2003 At Close Range
- 2007 Weapons of Tomorrow
- 2008 Autopsy (with Gridlok)
- 2018 The Light (with Liquid)
