= Homegrown (drum and bass event) =

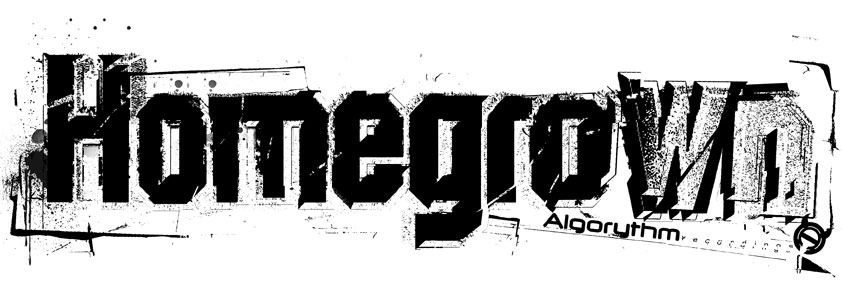

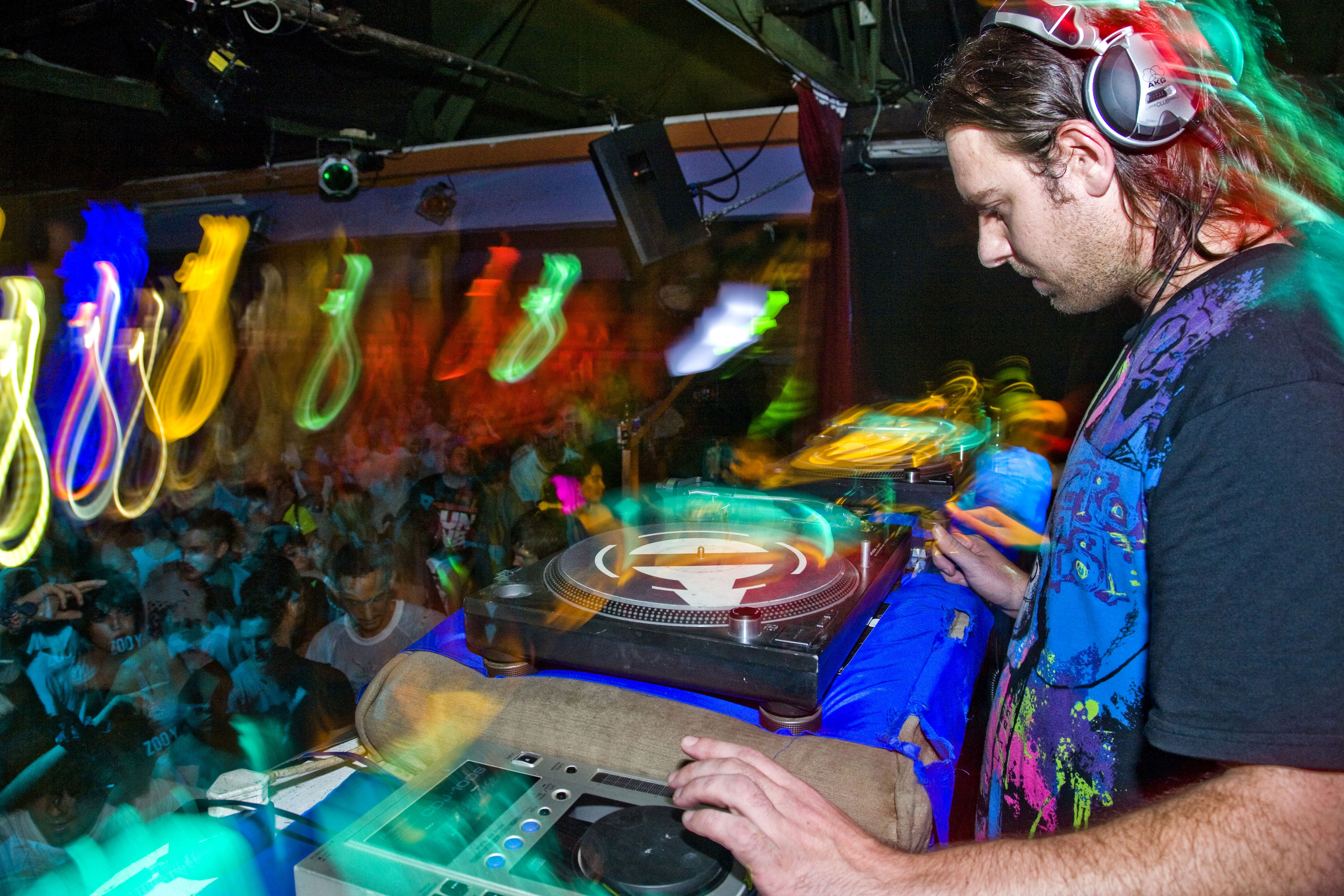
- Counterstrike at Homegrown, April 2009
- Genre: Drum & Bass
- Frequency: Monthly
- Locations: Mercury Live; Cape Town, South Africa
- Years active: September 2000 - November 2012
- Founded: September 2000
- Next event: Pressure
- Participants: 650
- Organizer: Eaton Crous, Justin Scholtemeyer, Algorythm Recordings
- Website: www.algorythmrecordings.com

Homegrown was a monthly drum and bass event held at Mercury Live, Cape Town. It featured several international and local acts, including Dieselboy, Pendulum, Counterstrike, Donny, Raiden, Eye-D, Matt Impact, Robyn Chaos, Temper D, Nymfo, SFR and Hyphen.

Owned and managed by Algorythm Recordings, the event took place every first Saturday of the month, and was the longest running drum and bass event in South Africa. The last Homegrown was held on 3 November 2012. It has subsequently spawned a successor event called 'Pressure', which occupies Homegrown's original venue and schedule, hosted by SFR, Hyphen and RudeOne.

== History ==
The first Homegrown event was held in September 2000 at The Jam (now Mercury Live). The event was masterminded by Algorythm Recordings. The idea behind it is to get South African drum and bass crews Algorythm, Sublime and Krushed & Sorted under one roof, once a month, for the first time. The focus is promoting artists who produce drum and bass locally, hence the name "Homegrown".

In 2001, Mercury Live offered Homegrown a monthly residency, making it a permanent fixture in the South African drum and bass scene. With drum and bass music requiring well-engineered, large sound systems, Algorythm developed a long working relationship with Hellfire Sound.

== Artist line-ups ==
Since its establishment in 2000, Homegrown has hosted a large range of artists, with headlining acts including Pendulum, Counterstrike, Dieselboy, Donny, Raiden, Eye-D, Matt Impact, Robyn Chaos, Temper D, MC Messinian and Nymfo.

The monthly event has also been a launching platform for South African drum and bass artists, with various acts such as SFR, RudeOne, MFU, Niskerone, Com.it, Rawkiss, B-Wise, TehSynes, MC Skywalker, Psyke and the Anti Alias performing multiple times. Resident DJs include Counterstrike and Hyphen.

== Flyer ==
Printed on perforated paper, Homegrown flyers are commonly used as gerrick or filters in the preparation of cannabis smoking. Early flyer and logo designs depicted images of marijuana plants and leaves. This was later changed to appeal to a much wider audience, however the perforated flyer is still in use.

Recent Homegrown flyers have contained QR Codes, storing URL data to downloadable MP3 and desktop wallpapers. All flyers and event visuals are designed by Eaton Crous himself.
