= The Human Resource =

The HUMAN Resource

Compilation album (Mix)
- Released: (United States) April 4, 2006
- Genre: Drum and bass; hardstep; darkstep
- Length: CD1 1:19:13; CD2 1:00:21
- Label: Human Imprint; System Recordings
- Compiler: Dieselboy

Dieselboy chronology
The Dungeonmaster's Guide (2004)	The HUMAN Resource (2006)	Substance D (2008)

The HUMAN Resource is a drum and bass compilation album presented by Dieselboy. The first disc is unmixed and the second disc is mixed by Evol Intent on Ableton. The CD art was designed by Dieselboy (Damian Higgins) with graphic artist Joel Savitzky. The HUMAN Resource was released on April 6, 2006, and debuted at number 14 on Billboard's Electronic Album chart.

== Track listing ==
Disc one:

1. "Paradise Lost (D-Star Remix)" – Vector Burn
2. "Mass Hysteria (Hive Remix)" – Bad Company UK
3. "Houston" – Kaos, Karl K, & Jae Kennedy
4. "Subculture (Upbeats Remix)" – Styles of Beyond
5. "Wargames '03" – DJ Fresh
6. "Catherine Wheel" – Skynet
7. "The Rapture" – Evol Intent & Ewun
8. "Grunge 3 (Dieselboy, Kaos, & Karl K Remix)" – Bad Company UK
9. "Barrier Break (Infiltrata & Hochi Remix)" – Dieselboy & Kaos feat. Messinian
10. "Broken Sword" – Evol Intent, Mayhem, & Think Tank
11. "Submission" – Dieselboy & Kaos
12. "Studio 54" – Kaos, Karl K, & Jae Kennedy

Disc two:

1. "Vivify" – Evol Intent & Dieselboy
2. "Parallel Universe" – Infiltrata & Define
3. "Broken Sword" – Evol Intent, Mayhem, & Think Tank
4. "Piss Friend" – The Upbeats
5. "Moonraker (Gridlok Remix)" – Kaos, Karl K, & Jae Kennedy
6. "Assimilation" – Evol Intent, Mayhem, & Psidream
7. "Subculture (Upbeat Remix)" – Styles of Beyond
8. "Xanadu (Stratus Remix)" – Kaos, Karl K, & Jae Kennedy
9. "Wargames '03" – DJ Fresh
10. "Mass Hysteria (Hive Remix)" – Bad Company UK
11. "Barrier Break" – Dieselboy & Kaos
12. "Barrier Break (Infiltrata & Hochi Remix)" – Dieselboy & Kaos
13. "Reality Check" – Evol Intent & Ewun
14. "Le Mammoth" – Upbeats
15. "The Rapture" – Evol Intent & Ewun
16. "Knowledge of Self (Evol Intent Remix)" – BT
17. "Grunge 3 (Dieselboy, Kaos, & Karl K Remix)" – Bad Company UK
18. "The Divide" – Ewun
19. "You Must Follow (Anthology)" – Stratus
20. "Atlantic State (Gridlok Remix)" – Dieselboy & Technical Itch
21. "Submission" – Dieselboy & Kaos
22. "Fundamental (Gridlok Remix)" – Sasha
23. "The Great Escape (Alliance Remix)" – BT

=== See also ===
- Human Imprint
- The 6ixth Session
- The Dungeonmaster's Guide
- Substance D
