= Burkeman =

Burkeman is a surname. Notable people with the surname include:

- DB Burkeman (also known as DJ DB), a British jungle/drum and bass DJ
- Oliver Burkeman (born 1975), a British author and journalist
