= Human Imprint =

Human Imprint Recordings
- Parent company: System Recordings
- Founded: 2002
- Founder: Dieselboy
- Genre: Drum and bass, dubstep, electro
- Country of origin: U.S.
- Location: Brooklyn, New York
- Official website: www.humanimprint.com

Human Imprint Recordings is an American drum and bass record label founded by Damian Higgins (professional name DJ Dieselboy) in New York City in 2002. Human began as a subsidiary of System Recordings and is mostly known for high energy releases in subgenres including techstep, hardstep and darkstep. In July 2009, Human Imprint parted ways amicably with System Recordings, and Dieselboy created the SubHuman: Human Imprint for dubstep and electro releases.

The label's album art encompasses conceptual themes based in science fiction and fantasy. Some of the graphics are created by Higgins himself. To date, Human Imprint, which has gained a reputation as a leader in the North American drum and bass movement, has released 22 singles (seven on SubHuman), nine EPs, and six albums.

American Human artists include Evol Intent, Hive, Gridlok, Infiltrata, Kaos, Karl K, Jae Kennedy, Stratus, KC, Vector Burn, Ewun, Noah D, Demo, Spktrm and Gein. International producers include Technical Itch (UK), Decoder (UK), Fresh (UK), Bad Company (UK), Skynet (UK), Counterstrike (South Africa), Concord Dawn (New Zealand), The Upbeats (New Zealand), and Zardonic (Venezuela).

== History ==
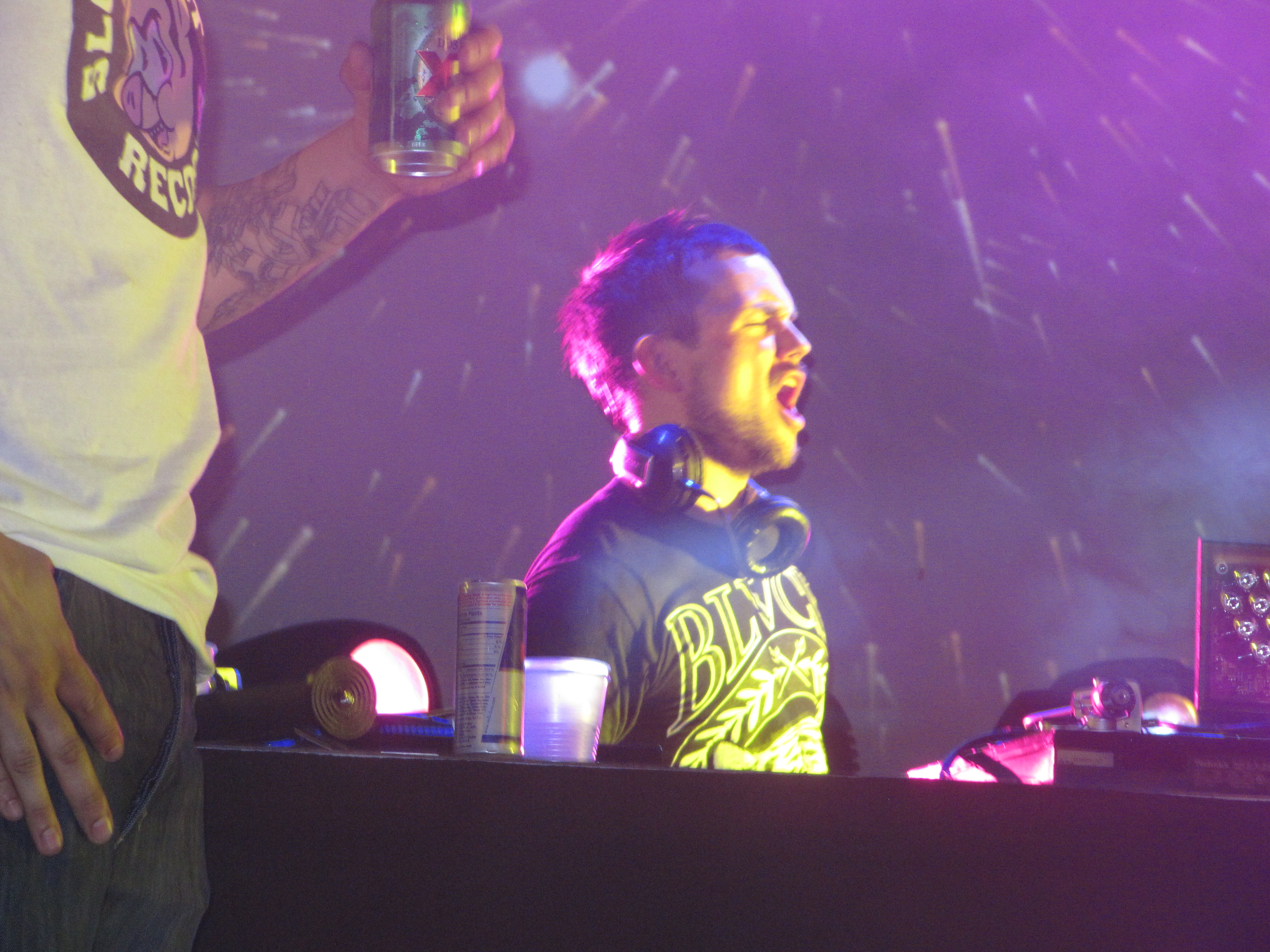
Founder Dieselboy

In April 2006, Higgins released the first Human Imprint compilation, a 2XCD set called "The HUMAN Resource," which debuted at #14 on the Billboard electronic album chart. Disc One: Selected Works is a 12-song un-mixed selection including club anthems and VIP remixes from Bad Company UK, DJ Fresh, The Upbeats, Dieselboy + Kaos, Counterstrike and others. Disc Two: Evol Intent Assemble the Monster features a continuous DJ-mix from one of the most-respected American drum and bass DJ/producer crews, Evol Intent, selected by Higgins to stitch together some of the best tracks of the Human Imprint catalog, plus exclusive tracks and remixes from Gridlok, Infiltrata + Hochi, Vector Burn, Dieselboy + Technical Itch and others. The mix was composed on Ableton. The album art was created by Dieselboy with graphic artist Joel Savitzky.

In May 2010, Higgins and new partner Steve "Smash" Gordon of Steez Promo of Baltimore, Maryland, and Circle Management (based in Philadelphia, PA), relaunched Human Imprint with its first release, SPKTRM's Planet Human EP, on June 14, 2010, followed by Zardonic's South Of Human EP and Gein's Human Chemistry EP. In September 2010 they launched the SubHuman : Human Imprint sublabel for dubstep and electro releases. Artists include Bare, Mark Instinct, Muffler, NumberNin6, PXL FST, and Smash Gordon.

In February 2012, Higgins and Gordon launched Planet Human as the new umbrella label for Human Imprint and SubHuman with the following artist roster: Dieselboy, Smash Gordon, Bare, Hulk, Mark Instinct, Mayhem, Muffler, Nerd Rage, Nightwalker, NumbernIn6, Pixel Fist, Sluggo, Subshock, Dan Wall, Zardonic.

== Planet Human Mixes ==
- "Dieselboy – Live at Beta," mix by Dieselboy, free download, April 13, 2012
- "Smash Your Fucking Face Vol. 4," mix by Smash Gordon, March 15, 2012
- "Wake the Dead," mix by Dieselboy, free download, February 6, 2012

== See also ==
- SubHuman: Human Imprint
- List of record labels
- List of jungle and drum'n'bass record labels
- Dieselboy
  - The 6ixth Session (2000)
  - The Human Resource (2006)
  - Substance D (2008)
