= Human resources (disambiguation) =

Human resources is the group of individuals who make up the workforce of an organization.

Human resource may also refer to:

- Human resource management, the field or department that handles the management of an organization's workforce
- Human Resources (audio drama), a Doctor Who audio drama
- Human Resource (film), a 2025 Thai film directed by Nawapol Thamrongrattanarit
- Human Resources (1999 film) or Ressources humaines, a French film directed by Laurent Cantet
- Human Resources (2023 film), a Mexican-Argentine black comedy-drama film
- Human Resource (band), Dutch electronic music band
- The Human Resource, a drum and bass compilation album presented by Dieselboy
- Human Resources (TV series), a spin-off of the American animated sitcom Big Mouth
- "Human Resources" (song), by We Are Scientists from the 2023 album Lobes
- "Human Resources", a 2025 short story by Adrian Tchaikovsky
