= Five Fingers of Funk =

American hip hop band

- Origin: Portland, Oregon, United States
- Genres: Rap
- Years active: 1994-1999, 2020–present
- Labels: Ho-Made Media, E Platinum Entertainment
- Members: Talbott Guthrie; Pete Miser; Steven Mitchell; DJ Chill Blend (DJ Chillest Illest); Allan Redd; Ted Hille; Curt Bieker; Josh Prewitt; Tim Cook; Todd Smith; Mac Brown
- Past members: Brian "Zaidi" Twitty; Mark "Sparky" Hardy; Mark Ricker

Five Fingers of Funk, also stylized as 5 Fingers of Funk, is an American hip hop group that formed in 1992 and is currently based in Portland, Oregon. Pete Miser met drummer Talbot Guthrie and together they formed what originally was a nine-piece group. They grew to be a ten-piece group that performed at venues such as La Luna, Satyricon, Roseland Theater, X-Ray Cafe, and Berbati's Pan. The group is an example of hip hop from Portland, where it's generally considered lacking. Pete Miser, the lead vocalist described the Portland hip hop culture as "dope, but it has such a marginalized status". The members take influence from old-school rap and Bootsy Collins funk and differ from their peers by generating sounds from instruments instead of electronic sampling. The group has also been described as combining the sounds of James Brown, Sly Stone, and Funkadelic with 90s hip hop. Sounds are created with instruments such as keyboards, drums, bass, horn section, and turntables.

The group toured for several years on the west coast from California to British Columbia and played with acts like Fishbone and Maceo Parker. Eventually, Miser left the group in 1999 and moved to Brooklyn, New York to become a solo artist. The group reunited in 2020 for the single, "Who's Gonna Take the Weight" to inspire voters in the American elections of 2020. It was the first time the band recorded together since 1998.

During the COVID-19 pandemic, Pete Miser wrote a series of songs about his hometown, Portland, Oregon. Working with the original band members and other Portland hip hop artists they remotely recorded and produced Kill Sound, releasing it in May 2023 on Kill Rock Stars.

The band reunited for a show and played sections from Kill Sound At Portlands Music Millenium on May 13, 2023.

== Discography ==
=== Studio albums ===
- Slap Me (1995)
- About Time (1998)
- Twisted and Lifted (2001)
- Portland Say it Again (2023)
