= Ill.Skillz =

Austrian drum and bass group

- Origin: Vienna, Austria
- Genres: Drum and bass, electro house
- Years active: 2001–present
- Labels: Commercial Suicide Records; Critical Recordings; Moving Shadow; DSCI4; Freak Recordings; Ill.Skillz Recordings; Metalheadz; Renegade Hardware; Trickdisc; Dim Mak Records
- Members: D.Kay; Raw.Full

Ill.Skillz is a drum and bass group formed in Vienna, Austria in 2001. The group is composed of David "D.Kay" Kulenkampff and Philipp "Raw.Full" Roskott who met in 1999 while they were both involved in event promotion with the trife.life! crew.

== Releases ==
=== LPs ===
Catalogue	Title	Year
ILL013CD	Nectar & Ambrosia	2011

=== EPs ===
Catalogue	Title	Year
TD007	Fusion Dance EP	2002
DSCI4010	The Remix EP	2003
DM406	Who Is Crazy EP	2013
NXT009	Straylight EP	2014

=== Singles ===
Catalogue	Title	Year
CRIT008	Forgive Myself (Remix) / Forgive Myself	2003
ILL001	Bowser / Soulshaker	2003
ILL002	Fusion Dance (Remix) / Move It	2004
ILL003	Watch Me Now (With Concord Dawn)	2004
ILL004	Soulshaker (Remix)	2004
ILL005	The Beat	2005
METH065	When Worlds Collide / Clownz	2005
ILL006	Colours Of Noize (With Calyx) / Guru	2006
ILL007	Can't Touch This	2006
ILL008	Watch Me Now (With Concord Dawn) (Remix) / The Great Escape	2007
ILL010	Exodus / Move It (Chris Su & SKC Remix)	2009
NHS155	Directions (For Hospital Records' Compilation album "Sick Music 2")	2010
ILL011	Backtrack / Stella Nova	2010
ILL012	Gridline (with Logistics) / They Could Love	2010
DM340	Birdz	2012

=== Remixes ===
Catalogue	Artist	Title	Year
TD004	Tomkin	E-Sparks (Ill.Skillz Remix)	2001
MV005	Imagination D	The War Is Over (Ill.Skillz Remix)	2003
BRK001	K.D.S. (Feat. Robbie Craig)	The Experience (Ill.Skillz Remix)	2004
PROOF24X	DuMonde	Human (Ill.Skillz Remix)	2004
FREAK005	Concord Dawn	Bad Bones (Ill.Skillz Remix)	2004
HOSTILE003	Sunchase (Feat. Yana Kay)	Remember Me (Ill.Skillz Remix)	2004
ILL003	D.Kay & Epsilon	Platinum (Ill.Skillz Remix)	2004
SANTW300	D.Kay & Epsilon (feat. MC Verse)	Honey (Ill.Skillz Remix)	2004
ILL004	Black Sun Empire	B Negative (Ill.Skillz Remix)	2005
VRS015	Ed Rush & Optical	Sick Note (Ill.Skillz Remix)	2005
PRCSN28	Makai	Beneath The Mask (Ill.Skillz Remix)	2007
NHS155	Logistics	Warehouse (Ill.Skillz Remix)	2010
	fii	I Still Love You (Ill.Skillz Remix)	2012

=== Featured on ===
Catalogue	Title	Mixed by	Year
RUN33747	At Close Range	AK1200	2003
BSECD001	Driving Insane	Black Sun Empire	2004
05161-2	Inside Aut: The Austrian Drum & Bass League	Huda	2004
HUMA8008-2	The Dungeonmaster's Guide	Dieselboy	2004
RHLP05	Skool Of Hard Knocks	Bad Company UK	2004
METH05CD	MDZ.05	Goldie	2005
ASHADOW952CD	Moving Shadow 05.2	Calyx	2005
WSMCD218	Drum & Bass Essentials	DJ Hype	2005

== See also ==
- List of record labels: I–Q
