= Pete Miser =

American rapper

- Born: Peter Ho; February 3, 1971 (age 55); Portland, Oregon, United States
- Origin: Portland, Oregon, U.S.
- Genres: Hip hop
- Occupations: Producer, DJ, Creative Mastermind, Fresh Emcee (Rapper)
- Instruments: Voice, drums, Turntables
- Years active: 1995–present
- Label: Ho-Made Media
- Website: PeteMiser.com

Peter Aaron Ho (born February 3, 1971), known by the stage name Pete Miser, is an American Hip Hop rapper and producer living in New York City.

== Biography ==
Originally from Portland, Oregon, Miser is involved in the hip-hop scene in the Northwest United States. He was the lead vocalist in the live hip-hop band Five Fingers of Funk.

After six years with the Fingers, Miser moved to Brooklyn, New York City to explore hip-hop in its birthplace. In 1999, artist Dido recruited him as the DJ in her live band. With Dido, Miser toured the world, appeared on numerous television shows.

In past years Miser was also a featured in the final Top 6 of the MTV2 Dew Circuit Breakout.

Miser's music has been featured in numerous major motion pictures including but not limited to "The Night Listener", "TATS Cru: The Mural Kings" & the ESPN documentary "Through The Fire", as well as three exclusive Bacardi commercials featuring his song "Only For Today".

Miser was featured in the pH10 single from 2003, titled "Needless to Say."

In early 2008, Miser released a YouTube video for short song "Hit Me On My iPhone".

In 2013, Miser was featured on British singer Dido's album Girl Who Got Away on the deluxe-edition track "All I See".

He produced and is featured in Jin's song "Open Letter to Obama".

== Discography ==
=== Albums ===
Year	Album	Artist
2023	Portland Say It Again	Five Fingers of Funk
2017	Depression Era Thinking	Pete Miser
2011	Honest Mistakes	Pete Miser
2010	She A Hippie Single	Pete Miser
2004	Camouflage Is Relative	Pete Miser
2004	Scent of a Robot/So Sensitive Single	Pete Miser
2002	Radio Free Brooklyn	Pete Miser
1999	For You/Just One Rhyme Single	Pete Miser
1998	About Time	Five Fingers of Funk
1996	What It Be...	Pete Miser
1994	Slap Me 5	Five Fingers of Funk

=== Other appearances ===
Year	Album	Artist
2008	Heat Brings Heat	Subatomic Sound System
2005	Lost Hits Vol.1: Dancehall Versus Hip Hop	Subatomic Sound System
