= PH10 =

US musical group

pH10 is an electronica music group based in Denver, Colorado, known for its jungle and drum and bass style. The group was founded in the late 1990s by Recone F. Helmut and Clark ov Saturn after they left the industrial rock band LD-50. pH10 was honored as the First Place winner of Jive Magazine's International Songwriting Competition 2005 for the track "Tell Me Why", a collaboration with hip hop vocalist Pete Miser. Their most recent album, "Well Connected" (2008), was praised for its intense and experimental sound.

== Biography ==
pH10 was founded by Recone F. Helmut and Clark ov Saturn after their departure from the industrial rock band, LD-50. Their debut release, "Recone Helmut vs. Clark ov Saturn" was one of the Denver Westword's "20 best recordings to come out of Denver in 1998". Shortly thereafter, Helmut and Saturn signed with Mutant Sound System/ Trumystic Records, toured with Dr. Israel and the Trumystic Sound System throughout Europe, and then relocated to Brooklyn, NY. Saturn eventually split and started working in minimal techno group Socks and Sandals with Nicolas Sauser. Helmut continued to produce albums with vocalist Pete Miser and his new partner, SyBO. pH10 returned to Colorado in 2005.

== Current members ==
Recone F. Helmut - Producer, vocals

SyBO - Producer, vocals

Pete Miser - Collaborating vocalist

== Discography ==
Albums

- Well Connected (Helmutplex Records, 2008, Denver)
- Helmutvision (Helmutplex Records, 2004, Brooklyn, NY)
- Quarks and Gluons (Helmutplex Records, 2002, Brooklyn, NY)
- Sci-Fidelity (Freedomzone, 2000, Brooklyn, NY)

Singles/EP's

- Needless to Say (feat. Pete Miser) (Helmutplex Records, 2003, Brooklyn, NY)
- Defender (Terraform Records, 2002, Denver, CO)
- Recone Helmut vs. Clark ov Saturn (pH10, 1997, Denver, CO)

Compilations

- BK United - The Pete Miser Files (Helmutplex Records, 2006, Brooklyn, NY)
- System Evolution (Terraform Records, 2000, Denver, CO)

Productions on other artists' recordings

- Soothsayer "Zen Turtle" - Track: "The Business" (Trumystic Records, 1999, Brooklyn, NY)
- Dr. Israel "Inna City Pressure" - Track: "Crisis Time" (Trumystic Records, 1999, Brooklyn, NY)

== Past Collaborators ==
Clark ov Saturn

== Articles and Reviews ==
- pH10 Press site
- Westword review of Helmutvision
- Westword Review of debut EP "Recone Helmut vs. Clark ov Saturn
