= Era of Diversion =

Studio album by Evol Intent
- Released: March 4, 2008
- Genre: Darkstep, IDM, hip hop, drum and bass
- Label: Evol Intent, System Recordings
- Producer: Evol Intent

Professional ratings
Review scores
Source	Rating
PopMatters	(8/10)

Era Of Diversion is the first studio album by American drum and bass trio Evol Intent.

== Track listing ==
1. The Foreword feat. J Messinian (2:32)
2. Era Of Diversion (4:18)
3. The Curtain Falls feat. The Sound Of Animals Fighting (4:39)
4. South London (3:18)
5. Death, Lies & Videotape feat. Cypher Linguistics (3:23)
6. Odd Number feat. Ewun & Vicious Circle (4:39)
7. Awkward Rhythm Of The Dance (1:29)
8. 8-Bit Bitch feat. Ewun (Spor Remix) (4:09)
9. I'm Happy Your Grave Is Next To Mine (5:50)
10. 5:30 PM (2:44)
11. Reality Check feat. Ewun (3:51)
12. Smoke & Mirrors feat. Aaron Bedard (4:01)
13. Mutiny (4:05)
14. Double Glock (1:04)
15. Dead On Arrival (4:01)
16. Gunpowder Plot (3:02)
17. Middle Of The Night (5:16)
18. The Oscine's Lament (4:15)
19. Maybe We'll Dance Tomorrow (4:21)

== Personnel ==
- Producer – Evol Intent
- Written by A. Jones, M. Diasio, N. Weiller
