= Bro Safari =

- Also known as: Knick
- Born: Nicholas Weiller; April 6, 1978 (age 47)
- Origin: Atlanta, Georgia, U.S.
- Genres: Moombahton, moombahcore, trap, dubstep, drum and bass
- Occupations: Songwriter, remixer, record producer
- Years active: 2008–present
- Labels: Renegade Hardware, Barcode Recordings, Outbreak, Human Imprint, Lifted Music, Mad Decent, Owsla, Play Me Records
- Website: brosafari.com

Nicholas Weiller, better known by his stage name Bro Safari, also known as Knick, is an American moombahton, trap, and dubstep producer.

== Biography ==
Weiller was born in Rome, Italy, into a family with three brothers and one sister. The entire family moved back to Atlanta, Georgia. While growing up in Atlanta, he took to playing several instruments, including guitar, bass, and drums. Although an avid punk rock fan, he gained a deep interest in electronic music in college and began producing Drum N' Bass around 1999. He joined the drum and bass trio Evol Intent in 2000 in his hometown of Atlanta. Weiller has also produced trap, moombahton, and dubstep under the moniker Bro Safari starting in 2008. He formulated the producer name by throwing around "Broseph" and "rastafari" combining it to for Bro Safari, the current name he tours under.

Weiller formed the group Minus Music with Matthew Kelly, producing under the name. Matthew Kelly eventually received a Doctorate in Middle Eastern Studies, and lived in Jerusalem.

He currently lives in Austin, Texas with his wife Heather (aka Robotpoko), and their son. Heather is a stay at home mom who devotes her life to her family, the fans and arts and crafts.

Weiller's remix of Antiserum x Mayhem's "Breaking In" was featured on the soundtrack of Madden 17.

=== 2016–present: Follow & Reality ===
On May 16, 2016, Bro Safari released his single "Follow".

On September 9, 2016, Bro Safari released his single "Reality" featuring the singer Sarah Hudson.

== Discography ==
=== Albums ===
Title	Details	Track list
Animal (with UFO!)	Released: May 22, 2013; Label: Bro Safari Music; Formats: Digital download	The Dealer; Chimbre (featuring Anna Yvette); Drama; Sputnik; Animal; Burn The Block; Tracers; Bird Brain; Zombies; No Time To Sleep

=== Extended plays ===
List of extended plays
Title	Details
Clockwork (with UFO!)	Released: August 24, 2018; Label: Bro Safari Music; Formats: Digital download

=== Singles ===
2018

- "N.U.M.B." (with UFO!)

2022

- "As Above So Below" (with Kill The Noise and Tasha Baxter)

=== Remixes ===
- Evol Intent - Middle Of The Night (Bro Safari Remix)
- M.I.A. - Y.A.L.A. (Bro Safari and Valentino Khan Remix)
- Kill The Noise - Rockers (Bro Safari and UFO! Remix)
- Zomboy - Terror Squad (Bro Safari and Ricky Remedy Remix)
- Treasure Fingers - Rooftop Revival (Bro Safari Remix)
- Brillz and Teddy Tuxedo - Buckwild (Bro Safari and UFO! Remix)
- Flux Pavilion - Mountains & Molehills (Kill The Noise and Bro Safari Remix)
- Skrillex featuring Damian Marley - Make It Bun Dem (Bro Safari and UFO! Remix)
- MAKJ - Hold Up (Bro Safari and UFO! Remix)
- Atlantic Connection - My Love (Bro Safari Remix)
- Bro Safari and UFO! - The Dealer (Evol Intent Remix)
- Antiserum and Mayhem - Breaking In (Bro Safari Remix)
- Atliens - Shelter (Bro Safari and Binks Remix)
