= Counterstrike (drum and bass group) =

South African music band

- Also known as: Animal Chin, 500 Mills
- Origin: South Africa; Prague/London
- Genres: Drum & bass, dubstep
- Years active: 1998–present
- Labels: Algorythm Recordings; Barcode Recordings; Human Imprint; Moving Shadow; Prspct Recordings
- Members: Justin Scholtemeyer; Eaton Crous
- Website: algorythmrecordings.com

Counterstrike is a drum and bass music producer duo from Cape Town consisting of Justin Scholtemeyer and Eaton Crous. They are considered to be one of the pioneers of the South African drum and bass scene. Counterstrike are known for their composition of raw, high-energy sound inspired by metal, techno and early techstep.

== Biography ==
Counterstrike, also known as Animal Chin and 500 Mills, have been active drum & bass DJs and producers since the mid-1990s. Collectively producing since 1998, the duo drew attention for their releases on various high-profile labels such as Rob Playford's Moving Shadow, Dieselboy's Human Imprint, Barcode Recordings and Dylan's Obscene. Algorythm Recordings, their own imprint, was re-launched in 2005 and includes releases from artists such as Current Value, Limewax, SPL and T.Z.A.

== Discography ==
=== Singles ===
- 2001: Pressure / Questions (featuring Tasha Baxter) on Allied Recordings
- 2003: Doom Prophet / Damaged on Core Productions
- 2003: Candy Flip / Existenz on Invader
- 2003: Monster Munch / Tortured Soul on Outbreak Limited
- 2003: Synergy / End of Line on Cell Recordings
- 2003: Metalgear (aka Counterstrike) & Impact - Evil Eye / Broken Crystal on Dynamic Recordings
- 2003: Stickfight / Metal Gear on Leet Recordings
- 2004: Sentinel / IO on Drop On Request
- 2004: V / Misfit on Cell Recordings
- 2004: Africanism / Bloodline on Outbreak Limited
- 2004: Never Enough (feat. Soma) / Aeons (feat. Drop Bass) on Revolution Recordings
- 2004: Spinal Tap (feat. Impact) / Diablo (feat. Psyke & Manta) on Cell Recordings
- 2004: Pierced on Revolution Recordings
- 2005: Killswitch / Enemy on Algorythm Recordings
- 2005: Ghost / Nemesis (feat. Sunchase & Tasha Baxter) on Revolution Recordings
- 2005: Bodybag / Mutilation on Obscene
- 2005: Deathstar / Truth on Algorythm Recordings
- 2005: Everchanging on Revolution Recordings
- 2006: White Light on Evol Intent Recordings
- 2006: The Power to Distort / Motherfucking Skulls (with Eye-D) on PRSPCT Recordings
- 2006: Revelation on Ohm Resistance
- 2006: Snuff / Timewarp on Algorythm Recordings
- 2006: Counterstrike & Genr8 - Grey Matter on Evol Intent Recordings
- 2006: Triggerhappy on Guerilla Recordings
- 2007: Counterstrike & Mumblz - Sickness & Suffering on Future Sickness
- 2007: Counterstrike & Eye-D - The Grind on Prspct Recordings

=== EPs ===
- 2005: Counterstrike – Phantasm / Merciless / Zulu Warrior / Zaire on Moving Shadow X
- 2005: Counterstrike – From Beyond The Grave EP feat. SPL, Limewax, T.Z.A on Algorythm Recordings

=== Albums ===
- 2004: Counterstrike - Can't Let Go - Biolological Warfare LP on Outbreak
- 2005: Counterstrike - Gateway - Us Against The World LP on Barcode Recordings
- 2008: Counterstrike - Insubordination LP on Algorythm Recordings

=== Remixes ===
- 2000: Krushed & Sorted - King Of The Swingers (Animal Chin RMX) on African Dope
- 2003: Counterstrike - Candy Flip (Monkey & Large RMX) / Dimension Intrusion on Invader
- 2003: Counterstrike - V (Resonant Evil RMX) / Synergy (Raiden RMX) on Cell Recordings
- 2004: Counterstrike - Doom Prophet VIP / Damaged (Magna Karta RMX) on Core Productions
- 2004: Su3ject - Rage (Counterstrike Remix) on Trickdisk
- 2004: Muffler - Wreck (Counterstrike Remix) on Disturbed
- 2006: KC - Extreme Steel (Counterstrike Arena Remix) on Human Imprint
- 2007: DJ G-I-S - Inner Demons (Counterstrike Remix) on Intransigent
- 2008: Counterstrike & Mumblz - Sickness & Suffering (Donny Remix) on Future Sicness
- Counterstrike Vs. Josh Wink - I'm Ready VIP

=== CDs ===
- 2005: Various Artists – Us Against The World on Barcode Recordings
- 2005: Counterstrike - From Beyond The Grave on Algorythm Recordings
- 2008: Various Artists – Substance D on Human Imprint
- 2008: Counterstrike - Insubordination on Algorythm Recordings

=== Featured compilations ===
- 2001: Various Artists – Biogenesis mix CD on Algorythm Recordings
- 2001: Krushed & Sorted - Acid Made Me Do It on African Dope
- 2004: Counterstrike - Drum 'n Bass Singles 2002-2004 CD on Algorythm Recordings
- 2004: Various Artists – Biological Warfare CD mixed By Resonant Evil on Outbreak Recordings
- 2004: Various Artists – CD mixed by Temper D on Cell Recordings
- 2005: Various Artists – Kmag51 - Mixed by Rawkiss on Knowledge Magazine
- 2005: Various Artists – First Contact - Mixed by Audio on Invader Recordings
- 2005: Various Artists – Us Against The World - Mixed by Evol Intent on Barcode Recordings
- 2006: Various Artists – Kmag60 - Mixed by SPL & Limewax on Knowledge Magazine
- 2007: Various Artists – 66 Minutes Of Sickness - Mixed by Panacea on Resident Magazine
- 2007: Various Artists – Kmag70 - Mixed by Manifest on Knowledge Magazine
- 2008: Timewarp VIP, N/V/D (Counterstrike Zentraedi Remix) - Mixed by Dieselboy on Substance D

== Tours ==
Counterstrike regularly tour within Europe, playing at events and clubs such as Therapy Sessions, Respect (LA), Kings Of The Jungle, Homegrown (Cape Town), and Renegade Hardware at The End (London). Counterstrike have performed in Austria, Belgium, Bulgaria, Croatia, Czech Republic, Estonia, Germany, Lithuania, Netherlands, Poland, Portugal, Russia, South Africa, Spain, Sweden, Switzerland, Ukraine, and the United Kingdom.

== See also ==
- List of jungle and drum and bass artists
- Category:Drum and bass record labels
