= Dont Party =

South African internet blog

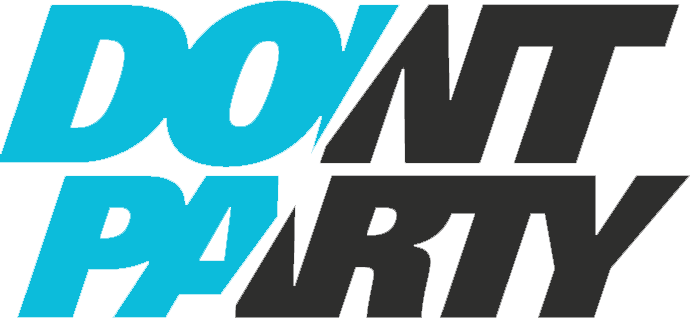
- Website type: Blog
- Owner: Alex Wright
- Website: DontParty.com
- Launched: 2009

Dont Party was a South African internet blog founded by Alex Wright & Thomas Kennedy in 2009. The website's primary focus was music, creative culture, design, fashion and nightlife news.
In 2010 Dont Party won 'Best Music Blog' at the South African Blog Awards and was runner up for 'Best Design Blog'.

== Content ==
=== Interviews ===
Dont Party featured a number of interviews ranging from fashion designers, street artists and musicians. The interviews included international recording artists such as The Bloody Beetroots, Above and Beyond, Steve Aoki, Donny, James Zabiela, The Glitch Mob, and Bassnectar.

=== Mix of The Week ===
A weekly segment launched every Wednesday showcased mixtapes from international DJ's and South Africa artists such as Haezer, DJ SFR, The Boomzers.

== Events ==
In late 2009, Dont Party began hosting events at The Assembly in Cape Town. Initially only hosting local acts, the event grew to expand and feature international headline acts such as Steve Aoki, Gtronic, Fukkk Offf, Gigi Barocco, Boom Monk Ben, DJ Antention and draw in a regular attendance of over 1,000 people per event.
