= SubHuman : Human Imprint =

- Founded: 2010
- Founder: Dieselboy (Damian Higgins), Steve Gordon (Smash Gordon)
- Genre: Dubstep, electro
- Country of origin: U.S.
- Location: Brooklyn, New York; Baltimore, Maryland
- Official website: www.facebook.com/planethuman

SubHuman : Human Imprint is an American record label which releases dubstep and electro house music

In September 2010, Dieselboy / Damian Higgins and partner Steve Gordon / Smash Gordf style, of Steez Promo of Baltimore, Maryland, and Circle Management (based in Philadelphia, Pennsylvania), launched the SubHuman sublabel of Human Imprint for dubstep and Electro house releases. Artists include Bare, Mark Instinct, Muffler, NumberNin6, PXL FST (Pixel Fist), and Smash Gordon.

SubHuman's May 11, 2011 "King Kong" release was the first collaboration between Bare and Datsik.

In February 2012, Higgins and Gordon launched Planet Human as the new umbrella label for Human Imprint and SubHuman with the following artist roster: Dieselboy, Smash Gordon, Bare, Hulk, Mark Instinct, Mayhem, Muffler, Nerd Rage, Nightwalker, NumbernIn6, Pixel Fist, Sluggo, Subshock, Dan Wall, Zardonic.

== Discography ==
=== Singles, EPs, and free downloads ===
Release	Artist	Catalog Number	Date
Garbage/Hunt You Down	NumberNin6	SBHM001	09/13/10
Calling Your Name/Gangwarz	Muffler	SBHM002	10/11/10
Bring It Back/Thugs In The Hood (Feat. MC Messinian)	Bare	SBHM003	11/01/10
Back Up/Controller	Muffler	SBHM004	11/22/10
Banshee/Collateral Damage	Bare	SBHM005	12/13/10
Move/Neurons	Muffler	SBHM006	01/17/11
Hard As Hell EP	The Grid: Bare; 2 Die 4: Bare; Gryllz: Bare; Game Changer: Bare	SBHM007	02/28/11
Fire/Clean Slate	Pixel Fist	SBHM008	03/21/11
Strength In Numbers EP	Bloodsport: Bare & Muffler; Murk That (feat. Messinian): Bare, NumberNin6 & Messinian; Freeze Frame: Bare & Mark Instinct; Bad Habit (feat. Messinian): Bare, Symbl & Messinian	SBHM009	04/11/11
Menace/Not This Time	NumberNin6	SBHM010	06/1/11
Battle for Cybertron EP	Cybertron: Muffler; Machines: Muffler; Heavy: Muffler; Megatronik: Muffler + Bare	SBHM011	06/27/11
Murder Machine EP	Murder Machine feat. Dieselboy: Bare + Mark Instinct; Shodan: Bare + Mark Instinct; Lifted: Bare + Mark Instinct; AI: Bare + Mark Instinct	SBHM012	07/18/11
Off The Chain EP	Off The Chain ft. Radrok: Mark Instinct; Get It ft. Messinian: Mark Instinct, Messinian; Strawberry: Mark Instinct; Grimey: Mark Instinct	SBHM013	08/15/11
The Brotorious EP	Brotorious: Hulk + Dan Wall; Assassin: Hulk + Dan Wall	SBHM014	09/27/11
World of Hurt EP	Suckerpunch: Bare; Droid X: Bare; Dirtybit: Bare; Broken: Bare	SBHM015	11/7/11
Elbows of Fury EP	I Am Captain: Sluggo + Nerd Rage + Terrabad: Fumigate: Sluggo + Nerd Rage; Dark Crystal: Sluggo + Nerd Rage; Epic Win: Sluggo + Nerd Rage	SBHM016	11/28/11
Black Rainbow EP	Wrong Answer: Nightwalker; Boogeyman: Nightwalker; Strange Wilderness: Nightwalker; Rodeo: Nightwalker	SBHM017	2/21/12
Bad Medicine EP	NumberNin6: Drop This feat. Maksim; NumberNin6 + Zardonic: The Final Five; NumberNin6: Alchemy	SBHM018	3/27/12
Muffler Remixes Volume One EP	Calling Your Name - SKisM Remix; Cybertron - Pixel Fist remix; Move - Muffler VIP; Muffler + Bare: Megatronik - Pixel Fist remix; Controller: Tom Encore remix	SBHM019	4/10/12
Ursa Major EP	Bare: Enemies - Original Mix; Bare: Lobotomy - Original Mix; Bare: Night Moves - Original Mix; Bare: Titans - Original Mix; Bare: Earth Girls Are Easy - Original Mix	SBHM020	4/23/12
Muffler Remixes Volume Two EP	Cybertron - Pixel Fist drumstep remix; Gangwarz - Bare dubstep remix; Move - Nightwalker dubstep remix; Muffler + Bare: Megatronik - Ajapai dubstep remix; Neurons: Billy The Gent X Long Jawns electro house remix; Cybertron - Audio drum & bass VIP	SBHM021	5/23/12
Richter Scale EP	Subshock: Bring The Bass - Original drum & bass mix; Subshock: Catch Me - Original drum & bass mix; Subshock: Bring The Bass - Dubstep remix; Subshock: Disco Rocket - Original drum & bass mix	SBHM022	6/6/12
First Blood EP	Mayhem, Bare, Logam, TL: Full Metal Jacket - Original dubstep mix; Mayhem, Mark Instinct: Nerds - Original dubstep mix; Mayhem, Trench: Remember Me (Feat. Naz Tokio) - Original dubstep mix; Subshock: Mayhem, Logam, TL: Cryptkeeper - Original dubstep mix	SBHM023	8/21/12
Strength in Numbers 2 EP	Bare + Liquid Stranger: Rage - Original dubstep mix; Bare + Mark Instinct: Fucking Vicious - Original drum & bass mix; Bare + Messinian: Wasted - Original drum & bass mix	SBHM024	9/25/12
Human vs SubHuman EP	SPKTRM: Planet Human - Mark Instinct + Nerd Rage remix (Dubstep); Demo: OD - Mayhem remix (Dubstep); Zardonic + Counterstrike: Hardcore Will Never Die - Bare Noize remix (Dubstep); Dieselboy + Evol Intent + Ewun: Midnight Express - SPL + ill.Gates + Triage remix (Dubstep); Evol Intent + Ewun: The Rapture - NumberNin6 remix (Dubstep); Zardonic + Mumblz: Systems Activated - Pixel Fist remix (Dubstep))	SBHM025	10/23/12
One Hundred Ten EP	Uman: Cheap Thrills - Original indie dance/nu disco mix; Bare: Sleep - Original indie dance/nu disco mix; Subshock: Bomba - Original indie dance/nu disco mix; Whiskey Pete + Subshock: Bass Hustle - Original electro house mix	SBHM026	11/6/12
Project No-Autotune	Schoolboy (Drumstep) (#1 Beatport Drum & Bass Chart 2.4.13)	SBHM027	1/29/13
Panic Attack feat. Anna Yvette	ETC!ETC! + Must Die! (Dubstep)	SBHM028	3/5/13
N.V.D (Invid)	Dieselboy – Le Castle Vania & Computer Club Remix	SBHMLTD001	09/28/10
King Kong	Bare + Datsik	SBHMLTD002	05/11/11
Tear the Club Up 2099	DJ Class, Mark Instinct, Smash Gordon	SBHMLTD 003	10/17/11
Sentient	NumberNin6 + Torqux & Twist (UK)	SBHMLTD 004	12/12/11
King Kong Experiment EP	Bare + Datsik: King Kong - Billy The Gent X Long Jawns remix (Indie Dance/Nu Disco); Bare + Datsik: King Kong - Lucky Date remix (Electro House); Bare + Datsik: King Kong - Mark Instinct remix (Dubstep); Bare + Datsik: King Kong - Neon Steve remix (Breaks); Bare + Datsik: King Kong - Skeptiks remix (Dubstep); Bare + Datsik: King Kong - Terravita remix (Drum & Bass); Bare + Datsik: King Kong - Bare VIP (Dubstep); Bare + Datsik: King Kong - Original Mix (Dubstep)	SBHMLTD 005	5/8/12
Aftershock	Schoolboy (Electro house)	SBHMLTD 006	9/11/12
WTF	Nerd Rage (MUST DIE! I Want My Son Back remix) (Trap)	SBHMLTD 007	10/9/12
Shot Me Down	Bare	Free Download	10/29/10
Handz Up	Smash Gordon & Logun	Free Download	11/17/10
Voodoo People	The Prodigy (Muffler Remix)	Free Download	11/22/10
Rukkuz	Bare	Free Download	12/13/10
Upper Decker	Bare	Free Download	12/20/10
Purp & Yellow	Bare	Free Download	02/28/11
Immortal	Sasha (Kaos + Karl K remix)	Free Download	06/22/12
Atlantic State	Technical Itch + Dieselboy (Gridlok Remix)	Free Download	07/06/12
We Want Your Soul	Freeland (Raiden Remix)	Free Download	08/03/12
Banshee	Bare (Zardonic Drumstep Remix)	Free Download	11/12/12
Silence feat. Charlotte D	Mark Instinct (Dubstep)	Free Download	12/9/12
G.A.R	Subshock (Dubstep)	Free Download	12/21/12
OD	Demo: OD (Mayhem Remix) (Dubstep)	Free Download	2/4/13

=== Mixes ===
- "Dieselboy - Live at Beta!," mix by Dieselboy, free download, April 13, 2012
- "Dieselboy - Wake the Dead!," mix by Dieselboy, free download, February 6, 2012
- "Smash Your Fucking Face Vol. 3," mix by Smash Gordon, May 6, 2011
- "Dieselboy - Unleashed!," mix by Dieselboy, free download, January 31, 2011
- "In for the Kill" - Genre Changing Smash Up - DJ Edit 320, mix by Smash Gordon, December 3, 2010
- "This is Not for Your Computer Speakers," mix by Smash Gordon, December 2010
- "Smash Your Fucking Face Vol. 2," mix by Smash Gordon, August 22, 2010
- "Smash Your Fucking Face," mix by Smash Gordon, November 14, 2009

== See also ==
- Human Imprint
- Dieselboy
