= DJ SFR =

South African drum & bass, dubstep producer, and DJ

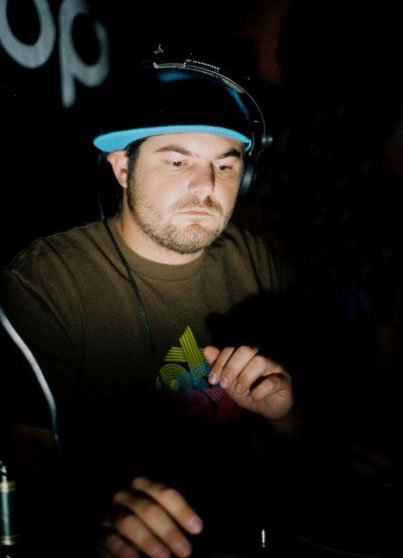
- DJ SFR performing at Fiction, Cape Town.

Background information
- Also known as: SFR
- Born: Julian Joseph; 11 August 1985 (age 40)
- Origin: Cape Town, South Africa
- Genres: drum & bass, dubstep
- Occupations: DJ, producer, musician
- Years active: 2003–present
- Labels: XS Dubz; Zombie Recordings; Trouble on Vinyl; Load Recordings; African Dope

DJ SFR is a South African drum & bass, dubstep producer and DJ from Cape Town. SFR's sound is known for its jump up and dub influences.

== Biography ==
SFR, also known as Julian Joseph, has been active as a drum & bass DJ and producer since 2003. He first rose to international prominence after winning DJ Hype's True Playaz mix competition in 2006. He has since released a number of drum & bass records on labels such as Trouble on Vinyl, Zombie Recordings and Load Recordings. In addition to his solo releases, he has also collaborated with Mix 'n Blend and Hyphen, whom he frequently DJ's back to back with at dubstep events.

His first dubstep tracks were released on XS Dubz in 2009.

SFR was recently interviewed on South African blog Dont Party for his production on Jack Parow track, Byellville.

== Discography ==
=== Releases ===
- 2006: Roots Fire Ridd'em on Big Love CD
- 2007: No Escape on LOAD Recordings
- 2007: Hypnosis / Rebound on Trouble on Vinyl
- 2008: Confi'don / Visions feat. Hyphen on Zombie Recordings
- 2009: Tantrum (with Mix 'n Blend) on African Dope
- 2009: Swings Dub / Future Science on XS Dubz
- 2010: Tourette Step / Binary Crunch on Guinea Pig

== DJ performances ==
SFR has performed in the United Kingdom, France, Belgium, Germany, Switzerland, Sweden, and South Africa. In Cape Town, DJ SFR is a frequent guest at the prominent underground club night Homegrown, as well as weekly event, It Came From The Jungle.
