= Clark Saturn =

American actor

Clark Saturn, also known as Clark ov Saturn, is an American musician, DJ, actor, filmmaker, comedian, and executive of the New Kingston Film Festival in New Kingston, New York. As an actor, Saturn was principal in many national and international commercials between 1999 and 2006. He also acted in several student films and self-produced films with friends Heidi Sjursen (A Potato Chip Tale) and Andrew Hubschmann (American Walker).

As a music producer and performer, Saturn is best known for his work with electronic duos Socks and Sandals (with Nicolas Sauser) and pH10 (with Recone F. Helmut), and LD-50. Saturn was a resident DJ in Brooklyn, NY at Halcyon's Sunday evening "Undercity" party, along with DJs Spinoza, Sheldon Drake, Mercy_Killah, HazMaat and others. In the realm of new media, Saturn was at the forefront of the videoblog revolution of the mid-2000s, and created the popular videoblogs ZipZapZop.com and MyGermanClass.com, which won a Best of 2006 People's Choice award for video podcasts from Apple's iTunes. Saturn's video interview of Todd Polenburg called "Bush Bush Revolution" was featured on Rocketboom.

== Biography ==
Clark ov Saturn was born in Cedar Falls, Iowa as "Baby Boy Wood" on June 26, 1969, and was soon thereafter adopted and named Clark Jason Nelson. He graduated from Aurelia High School a year early and attended school at Bryne Videregaaende Skule in Bryne, Norway. He received a B.A. in German with a minor in Scandinavian Studies from Luther College in Decorah, Iowa in 1991. During the mid-1990s, he became well known in Denver, Colorado as "Herr Nelson" who taught high school German for the Denver Public Schools on their Public-access television cable TV channel in a show called "Tele Deutsch". The stage name "Clark ov Saturn" began being used in 1994 for various musical projects. After joining the industrial band LD-50, Saturn and Recone Helmut split off and formed pH10 and moved to New York City in 1999 after touring Europe with Dr. Israel and the Trumystic Sound System. While in New York, Saturn pursued acting, music production, DJing, filmmaking, standup comedy, improvisation, and online education. In 2005, Saturn started a videoblog, ZipZapZop.com as well as MyGermanClass.com. In 2021, Saturn started dubstep/bass music project ZipZapZop and side projects Pill Hill Deans and Luther VanGross, releasing music, remixes and international collaborations on streaming platforms via his SpaceTruckingMogul Records label as well as Gradient Audio and Sublimated Sounds.
