= Rregula =

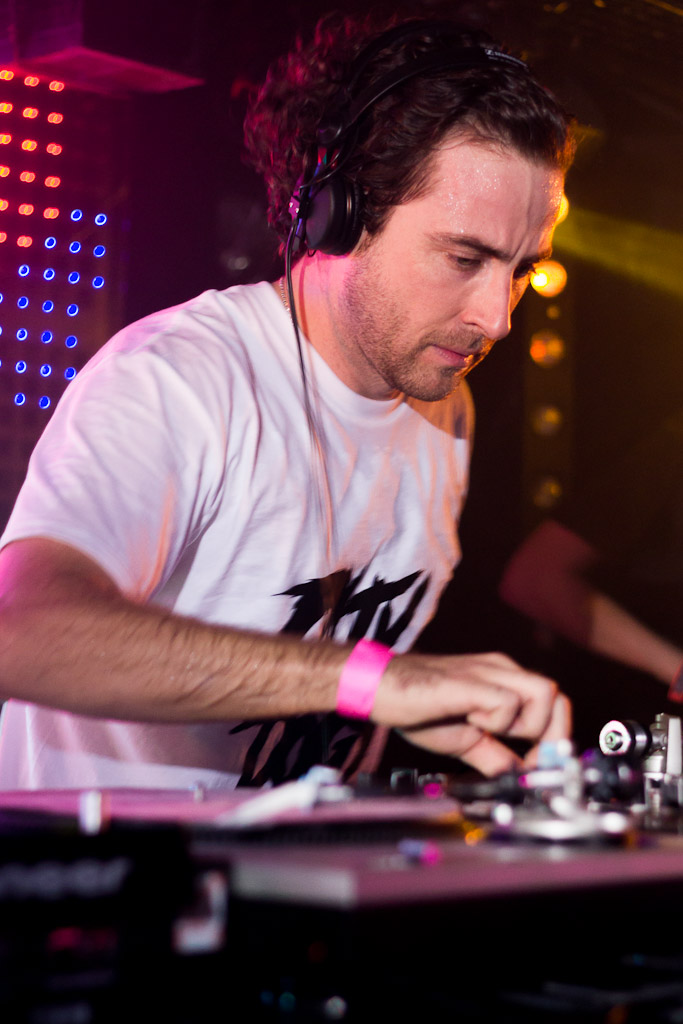

Background information
- Also known as: Bad Robot
- Origin: Perth, Western Australia
- Genres: Drum and bass, neurofunk, drumstep
- Occupations: Producer, DJ, musician
- Years active: 2002–2014
- Labels: Black Sun Empire Recordings; DSCI4 Recordings; Shadybrain Recordings; Climate; Triple Vision

Rregula was the stage name of Ross Deschamp, a drum and bass DJ and producer.

Based out of Perth, Western Australia, he started making drum and bass in 2001 after listening to the sounds of Sinthetix, Rob F, Skynet, SKC, Cause 4 Concern and Black Sun Empire.

In 2003, Rregula collaborated with fellow local producer Phetsta under the shared alias "Bad Robot". Together they had some successful releases, such as 2006's "Forever" on Black Sun Empire recordings.

Soon after, Rregula turned to solo production and has released many singles like the "Where Am I?" ep on Shadybrain recordings

Ross quit to write music as Rregula in 2014.

== Discography ==
=== Singles ===
- Divination (MP3) – (Static & Rregula) Kinematic320 (07/02/04)
- Circuit Breaker (MP3) – (Static & Rregula) Kinematic320 (10/08/04)
- Wavemaker (MP3) – (Rregula) Kinematic320 (03/15/05)
- City of Dogs (12") – (Rregula & Dementia) Disturbed Recordings (2007)
- Loose Control/Slicey (12") – (Rregula & Dementia) Basswerk (10/22/07)
- Badd Medicine (12") – (Rregula & Dementia) Flight Recordings (10/20/08)
- Corner Hash Man/Shit's Dope (12") – (Rregula) .shadybrain Music (04/08)
- Eye Turn Red (12") – (Rregula) Climate Recordings (04/08)
- Invasion/Downtime (12") – (Rregula & Mastermynd) (04/14/08)
- Fortress (12") – (Rregula & Dementia) Citrus Recordings (06/18/08)
- Junked Up/Run – (Rregula) Matome Recordings (08/26/08)
- Ocean Catch – (Rregula & Dementia) Disturbed Recordings (2008)
- Sludge Tunnel/Overcast – (Rregula & Dementia) Trust in Music (2008)
- "Where Am I EP" (2 x 12") – (Rregula feat. The Panacea & Silent Witness) shadybrain (2009)
- Life/Game of Life [m-Atome] 2006 feat seve
- Rregula debut album (album, 3x12", digital download) Climate Recordings (2010–2011)
- Stomp Shank Redemption (MP3) – (Rregula) Pure Pace Records (26 May 2011)
- Stomp Shank Redemption V.I.P (Mp3) – (Rregula) Pure Pace Records (28 September 2012)
