= LiveSummit =

English electronic dance music group

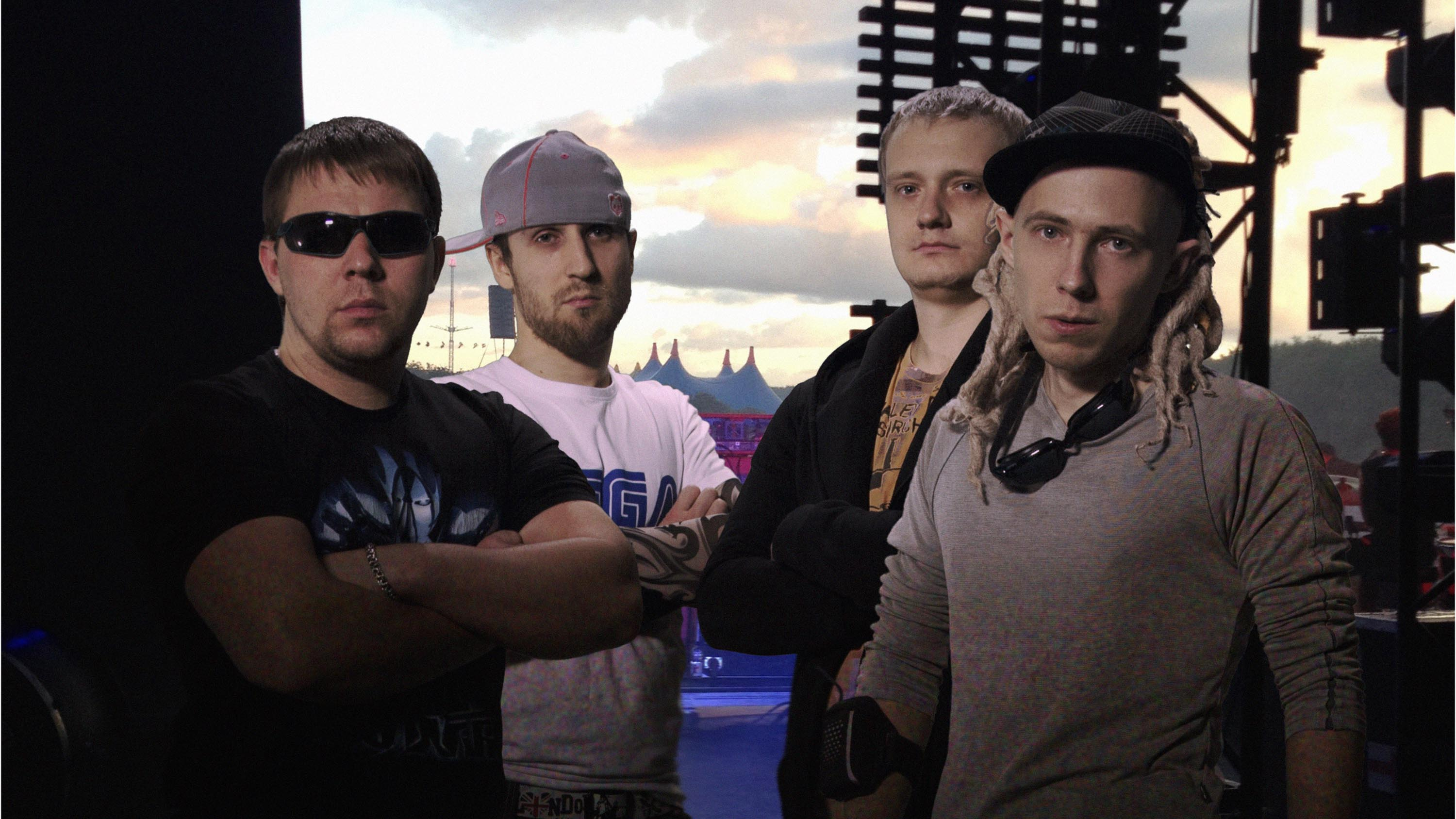
- LiveSummit fest

Background information
- Origin: Manchester, England
- Genres: Electronic dance music, trap, dubstep, drum and bass, indie rock
- Years active: 2008–present
- Labels: Dangerous New Age, Live And Dangerous, L.S.Union
- Members: Alex Matt; Alexander Freeman; Demetri Bazz; Roman Fox
- Website: livesummit.org

LiveSummit are an English electronic dance music group from Manchester, started in 2008 by Alex Matt. LiveSummit primarily focus on electronic dance music, trap music, drum and bass, dubstep, and similar, though they do play other musical styles. They have played with producers, DJs and musicians as DJ Fresh, John B, Mistabishi, Yoji, Kutski, The Panacea, Black Sun Empire, The Sect, Phace, Concord Dawn, Aphrodite as well being headliners at many big music festivals. They worked with different musicians and recording studio from around the World (Studios 301 (Australia), and studios (Germany), Star Delta (UK) and other). They have released albums on labels in Britain and the US.

FLY HIGH featuring AnnGree listed in the Beatport "10 Must Hear Bass & Drum Tracks". In 2013 a collaboration with the Australian band The Vangarde – D2F was number one on EDM chart ReverbNation. In 2014 year they recorded a two album Feel Evolution and presented symphony orchestra Sinfosynthetic Pt. I., and they brought themselves in the top of ReverbNation UK charts again. The next album "Energy Machine" was released in 2016 followed by the single "Break Me (trap remix)", and in the spring of 2017 the band once again takes the top of the UK charts and gets 17 place in the World of EDM (according to the ReverbNation.)

== Discography ==
Date	Title	Label	Charted	Country	Catalog number(s)
2011	LiveSummit EP	Live & Dangerous	–	UK	LDDEP2
2014	Sinfosynthetic, pt.I	—	–	USA	840090006038
2014	Feel Evolution	L.S.Union	–	UK	194676891144
2016	Energy Machine	L.S.Union	–	UK	872133063708
2017	Ocean	L.S.Union	–	UK	840095155120
2019	8 Mode	L.S.Union	–	UK	193829402220
2021	Rain	L.S.Union	–	UK	195938381939

=== Non-album tracks ===
Date	Album	Title	Label	Artist	Catalog number
2011	the Age of Existence LP	"Fly High"(Custom Soldierz remix)	Live And Dangerous	Various	LDDSLP1
2011	the Asylum LP	"Love"(original mix)	Live And Dangerous	Various	LDDSLP2
2012	Circuit Breaker	"Forgotton feat. AnnGree"(original mix)	Dangerous New Age	Various	DANAGEDIG008
2016	Outburst	"Outburst"	Live & Dangerous	-	B01BXDT6JS
2016	Me (feat. David M.J.G.& L.S.Union)	"Me (feat. David M.J.G.& L.S.Union)"	L.S.Union	-	B01FFTUCUI
2016	Break Me (trap remix)	"Break Me (trap remix)"	L.S.Union	-	B01M624U4E

== Band members ==
- Alex Matt – vocals, MC, synths, bass
- Alexander Freeman – synths, backing vocals
- Demetri Bazz – guitars
- Roman Fox – drums
