= DB Burkeman =

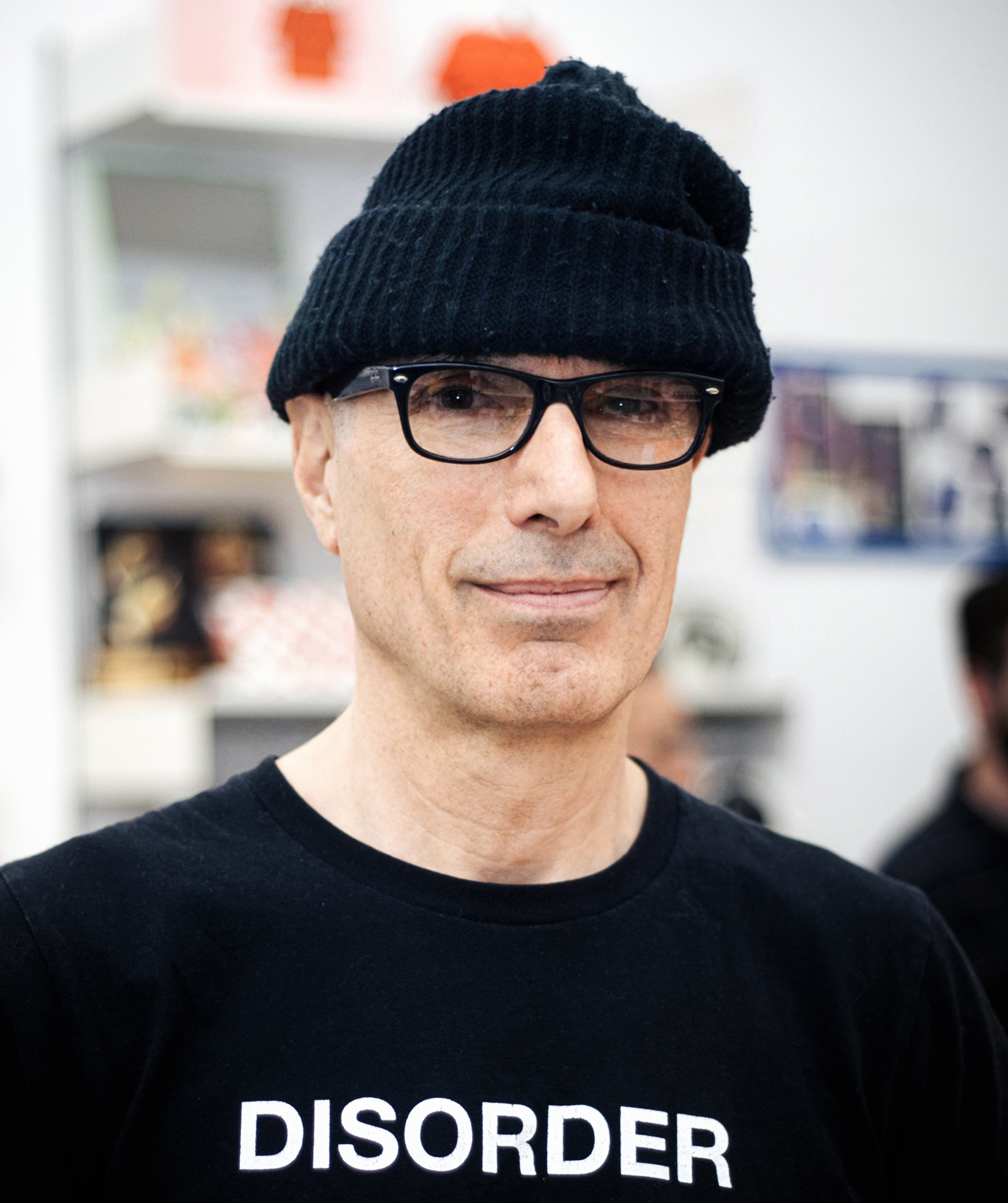
- DJ Burkeman in March 2024

Background information
- Origin: London, England
- Genres: Electronic, drum and bass, jungle
- Occupations: Musician, disc jockey, record producer, A&R, Author, Curator
- Labels: Breakbeat Science, Sm;)e Communications, F-111 Records
- Website: DB Does a Blog

DB Burkeman (also known as DJ DB) was a British jungle/drum and bass DJ who moved from London to New York in 1989. He was an early pioneer in rave culture in the U.S., credited as being partly responsible for bringing drum and bass to America. He was the co-founder of Breakbeat Science recordings and store, the first record store in the United States to specialize in drum and bass. He also was hired by both indie and major record labels, as well as music booking agencies to do A&R. Since 2010 he's mostly retired from DJ'ing, and has worked in the art and publishing worlds, curating exhibitions and authoring 5 books focused on various aspects of pop & counter culture. He's currently working on several new books, and his own publishing company, Blurring Books.

== Career ==
DB Burkeman was born David Burkeman in London, England. He first used the name DB when he began DJing by the name DJ DB in London in the mid-eighties. He fully changed his name to DB Burkeman when he moved to New York City in 1989. Arriving in New York in 1989 from London, where he was resident DJ and promoter at the London version of The Limelight, he soon had DJing residences at MARS, Red Zone and MK and throwing outlaw club events known as DEEP. DB Burkeman is considered one of the early pioneers of electronic music, responsible for exposing the genre to a wider audience in the U.S. He first produced raves and club events based on a U.K. aesthetic and sound, then worked in A&R for Profile Records as an Executive Producer for some of the first Techno, House, and Jungle compilations in America. DB's name became synonymous with the Drum & Bass scene in the U.S. when he and DJ Dara opened Breakbeat Science, the first all Drum & Bass shop. In total, DB produced and released 13 mix CDs during his DJing career. In 1990 he was hired by Cory Robins of Profile Records to work with VP Gary Pini as A&R scout. He has served as A&R director for Sm:)e communications and later went on to co-found the F-111 imprint.

From 1992 till around 2005 DB was known in the U.S. for pushing and promoting the more musical and deeper side of Drum & Bass, first with in 1992 his hardcore Breakbeat club NASA at The Shelter, (featured in the Larry Clark film Kids then with Gary Pini by launching Sm:)e communications for Profile Records and releasing the first Jungle singles and compilations in the U.S., as well as signing DJ Dara, thus kick starting his artist career. He and Dara then opened Breakbeat Science, dedicated to Drum & Bass. It was the first record store solely devoted to Drum & Bass in the U.S. In 2006 Breakbeat Science was responsible for the first compilation in the U.S. of the burgeoning genre of Dubstep. In 2011 he produced an eclectic monthly mix show called BLURRINGRadio for Clocktower Radio that ran for five years. Now retired from being a club and rave DJ, he worked in the music industry as A&R for AM Only, then Paradigm Talent Agency, also acting as their creative director, curating the art in all four of their U.S. offices till 2021.

In 2010, DB moved into art and publishing by working with Rizzoli to publish a book focusing on the culture and history of stickers called "Stickers: From Punk Rock to Contemporary Art:." AKA "Stuck Up Piece of Crap". In 2014, he and Philip Kuperberg created "Star Warps," an online digital book spotlighting art and artists who have re-appropriated imagery from Star Wars. Since then he has written three more books, "Stickers Volume 2" in 2020, & "Art Sleeves" in 2021, a 40-year history of art & design on album covers, both for Rizzoli. He & Rich Browd used Kickstarter to self-publish "The Sm;)e Book" in 2021, focused on the re-appropriation of the Smiley face, and they are currently working on a second volume.

== Early career ==
DB dropped out of school with severe learning disabilities at age 16 and began pursuing aspirations of being a photographer. He attempted this with little success. In the late 1970s and early 1980s, he worked as an assistant to multiple photographers, one of whom specialized in photographing works of art using large plate cameras. Another was Peter "Kodick" Gravelle, the punk rock photographer responsible for many of the Stiff Records sleeves. Some photos taken by DB did make it to print, including sessions he did for the Flying Lizards.

1983 After having had "an epiphany listening to Evil Eddie Richards & Colin Faver" at the Camden Palace Theater, he got himself a job DJing at Stocks, "a ridiculous yuppie & Arab club" on the Kings Road, learning the skills he needed as he worked. During this era DB was also hired by The Rolling Stones office to play several private events, including Jade Jagger's 16th birthday party, several of Tina Turner's birthday parties, and the Rolling Stones’ own Grammy "Lifetime Achievement Award" event at the Roof Garden Club on Kensington High St.

1985 DB was hired as one of the main resident DJ's for the new London location of Peter Gatien’s Limelight club. Soon, DB began booking acts and promoting his own Tuesday at Limelight, The Bike Shed. He and DJ Tommy D played "five generations of Rock N’ Roll under one roof." The main musical focus was the emerging alternative and indie rock of the day.

1988 DB and Tommy D were booked to DJ in New York City. DB fell in love with the city and decided to leave London to give New York an extended try.

1989 Early in his New York City career, DB established weekly or monthly DJ residencies at the hot clubs of the day, including MARS, MK, Palladium, Nell’s, and Red Zone. The average DJ fee was only $125 per gig. DB and close London friend Dorian Chinner decided to work independently to create better events and make more money. They started throwing their own version of a party that DB had done the branding and artwork for in London, called DEEP. The first party was held in a photographer’s rental studio above a McDonald’s on 6th Avenue and 16th Street, followed by a couple more events in other locations. DEEP had been drawing in the cool ex-pats, but few outside that circle. They approached DJ Frankie Inglese and Jack Luber, partners in a hip club called Soul Kitchen to see if they would be interested in becoming partners in DEEP. They agreed, and the combination of U.K. and U.S. personality and aesthetic was an instant success. After only a month of word-of-mouth, and distribution of just 200 flyers, DEEP was drawing in 1000 people per event. This number grew to 2000 by end of DEEP’s year run. The party itself was illicit and had no permits, so it was constantly on the move. It cycled through five consistent locations, always one step ahead of the authorities. It was the first party to open up Irving Plaza as a public event space.

== The 1990s ==
1990 Cory Robbins & Gary Pini hired DB as an A&R consultant for dance music at Profile Records.

1991 In 1991, DB co-produced the "Best Of Techno Volume One" compilation with Gary Pini, which included such artists as Moby & Richie Hawtin. The success of this album led to six follow-up volumes. Pini and DB were then given their own imprint within the profile system, which was originally to be named NASA Music, after DB's club night by the same name. However, DB's ex-partner in the club night would not come to an agreement with the label over the name. Pini then proposed the name Sm:)e Communications, which was one of the first uses of emoticons in a name.

1993 From 1993 to 1998 (when Justin Nichols took over from DB in A&R), Sm:)e Communications released over 150 titles including singles, EP's, and albums. One such album was "History Of Our World," acknowledged as the first U.S.-released British Drum & Bass album. Sm:)e was also known for manufacturing all of their vinyl singles on colored 10"’s, or other collectible types of vinyl, such as die-cut shapes, and picture-discs.

In 1993 Gary Pini and DB were responsible for getting Robot Wars started by convincing Profile records to back the project, originally conceived by ex-Industrial Light & Magic model maker Mark Thorpe, they staged the first live events in San Francisco.

During this time, Pini and DB also became integral to the start of Robot Wars, before it became the hit British TV show. With the originator of the concept, Marc Thorpe, they organized live events in San Francisco from 1994–1997.

Through a relationship formed with German Techno musicians Air Liquide by releasing their music on Sm:)e, DB was invited to become a partner in their Temple Records store in 1994. The store was located in the basement of a rave/alternative lifestyle boutique called Liquid Sky. Dara also worked at the store. The pair had now lost interest in DJing any other subgenres of electronic music, apart from Drum & Bass. They discussed the concept of a record shop that would sell Drum & Bass exclusively.

While he began to DJ around the U.S., DB befriended Paul Morris, a fellow Londoner then at university in Gainesville, FL. Paul was close friends with Richard Russell, whom DB had met while licensing music from XL Recordings where he did A&R, and releasing Russell’s own Kicks Like Mule record "The Bouncer" in the U.S. DB’s booking agent at the time, Howard Schaffer, told DB that he was "burnt out from the unreliability of one particular DJ!" and no longer wanted to be an agent. DB suggested to Paul Morris that while he was deciding on a career path, he take on DB's bookings along with those of a few other DJ friends and connections. That seed of an idea has grown into arguably the best and most respected electronic music booking agency in the U.S., AM Only.

1996 DB and Dara, along with Paul Morris, opened the first Drum & Bass-only record shop, Breakbeat Science, on 9th street in the East Village of NYC. They later brought in Sean Shuter as a fourth partner. By 2001, it had grown out of its 9th St. location and they moved to a much larger space at 181 Orchard St, in the up-and-coming Lower East Side. Despite its initial success, after 9/11 the business could no longer sustain itself due to its downtown location and the economic decline. BBS, as locals knew it, had to close its doors or reinvent itself. The partners chose the latter, creating BBlessing, a men's fashion and lifestyle boutique that also sold records. While it received very notable press, it was still not able to survive the slow economy and in 2010 closed its doors for good.

1997 Due to the sudden chart success of electronic music in the U.S. with acts such as The Prodigy & Fatboy Slim, the major record labels all wanted their own "Electronica" imprint. Pini and DB at Sm:)e also had a massive commercial success in 1997 when they released the remix/remake of Run-D.M.C.’s "It's Like That" produced by Jason Nevins.

1998 Andrew Goldstone and DB were given a label deal at Warner Brothers called F-111, named after a painting that they both loved by the artist James Rosenquist. Within a few months, the pair realized that overall, the label was not set up for what they were trying to create. Before they had a chance to react or resign, they were approached and poached by the UK dance label Ministry of Sound. Ministry of Sound was in the process of setting up operations to launch in the U.S., and Goldstone and DB were hired as heads of A&R. However, Ministry of Sound soon pulled out of the U.S. market, letting Goldstone and DB go in 2000.

== The 2000s ==
In 2007 he released an artist album project called "Deep" with partner Stakka under the name Ror-Shak, focusing on pushing the limits on the more musical side of the D&B. The pair sold two of the songs to the CSI (franchise) before licensing the album to KOCH Records in the U.S & various EU labels.

In 2007, DJ DB was quoted in an essay was published in the book "Marooned: The Next Generation of Desert Island Discs" edited by Phil Freeman.

In 2010 DB, now using his full name DB Burkeman, expanded into another creative field by publishing a book on sticker art. DB had been collecting stickers since the 80's via punk rock & skate boarding, he and a partner (Monica LoCasio) created a history book, "Stickers- from Punk Rock to Contemporary Art" AKA Stuck-Up Piece Of Crap (for Rizzoli Publishing) on the subject of stickers, artists who've used the medium and their effect on popular culture. The pair are currently working towards touring the project as a museum quality exhibition for 2011. Stickers: From Punk Rock to Contemporary Art features the art of over 4000 stickers by more than 1300 artists.

In 2011, DB was brought on as a DJ for Clocktower Radio. He was on the air for five years as a DJ for Art On Air where he did a monthly eclectic mix tape show called BLURRINGradio. The show was a "mix-tape" of music, past & present that has, or was inspiring to him. The shows concept of a non genre, non decade specific show, was sparked by the memory of DB growing up listing to the late John Peel in London.

Between 1994 and 2008 DB has released 13 mixed CDs.

In 2015 DB was hired by Paradigm Talent Agency to assist with A&R for their music dept. but ended up helping design the new New York flagship offices & also co-curating the art for the massive Paradigm head office in Beverly Hills. He also curated art shows for the lobby areas of the New York & LA offices.

2019 Rizzoli published Vol 2 of his "Stickers: From Punk Rock to Contemporary Art" book.

== Personal life ==
In 1990, DB met Wini Rudkins, who would become his wife. They were married in 1998 and now live in Brooklyn with their two children, Max (born 2000) and Eve (born 2006).
