= D.Kay =

Austrian drum and bass producer (born 1979)

David Kulenkampff
- Also known as: D.Kay; Aikon; Mindmachine
- Born: David Kulenkampff; 1979 (age 46–47); Vienna, Austria
- Genre: Drum and bass
- Years active: 1996 - Present
- Member of: Ill.Skillz

D.Kay, a.k.a. David Kulenkampff (born 1979, Vienna, Austria), is a drum and bass producer.

In 2001 D.Kay came together with Rawfull to form Ill.Skillz, having met him while promoting club nights in Vienna. Tracks from D.Kay were released on Soul:R, Bingo, Hospital and Renegade Hardware, and he has worked with Kasra, Marcus Intalex and Black Sun Empire. In 2003 the track "Barcelona" (D.Kay & Epsilon featuring Stamina MC) reached #14 in the UK Singles Chart.

Kulenkampff is a grandchild of the entertainer, Hans-Joachim Kulenkampff.

== Discography ==
=== Charting singles ===
List of singles, with selected chart positions
| Title | Year | Peak chart positions | |
| Title | Year | AUS | UK |
|---|---|---|---|
| "Barcelona" (featuring Stamina MC) | 2003 | 53 | 14 |

== Interviews ==
- June 2003 interview with D.Kay at Drum & Bass Arena
- September 2003 interview with D.Kay at DNB Forum
- February 2006 interview with D.Kay at Play.fm
- D.Kay: der Soulshaker Interview by Resident magazine (Germany, 2007)
