= Perforated paper =

Craft material for embroidery

Sheets of perforated paper

Perforated paper is a craft material of lightweight card with regularly spaced holes in imitation of embroidery canvas. It is also sometimes referred to as punched paper.

Perforated paper is most commonly embroidered with cross stitch motifs and borders. Typical uses for such items include ornaments to decorate Christmas trees, bookmarks and greetings cards. It is also used in larger sized sheets to embroider motto sayings to frame and display on the wall. Since the paper is of a heavy weight, it does not require a hoop or frame when stitching.

Perforated paper is manufactured in a number of different colours and is typically sold as 14-count A4 size sheets. The count refers to the fact that there are 14 holes/perforations per linear inch.

== History ==
This material, known as Perforated card-board at the time, first became available in the 1820s as plain sheets used for the creation of bookmarks and small mottoes and sayings, often taken from the Bible. By the 1870s the Victorian craze for this inexpensive and versatile craft material was at its peak. The invention of new printing processes made the pre-printing of mottoes and bookmarks on the perforated paper possible. These items were extremely popular and original examples, in good condition, can still be found today. The Victorian fad of embroidering mottoes on perforated paper died out around 1910 and was virtually lost as a needleart until recently being rediscovered. Perforated paper as we know it today was invented by Justin Ruble of Pennsylvania.

== See also ==
- Cross-stitch
- Papel picado
