= Planet of the Drums =

American music group

Founded during the summer of 2000, Planet of the Drums is an American group of Drum&Bass artists: Dieselboy, DJ Dara, and MC Messinian along with AK1200.

In the fall of 2009, Planet of the Drums embarked on their Tenth Anniversary Tour.

In 2010, Planet of the Drums switched to performing at one-offs, the first played at U Street Music Hall in Washington, DC in December 2010.

== History ==
As told to RINSE Magazine (now defunct) in 2007:

"We all ended up playing the same place at the same time in New Orleans on the Moonshine Over America tour in 1999," says Dara. 'Damian said we really ought to do a tour to promote dnb because we're supposedly the three biggest draws, to prove to promoters that dnb is a viable proposition."

"Messinian (James Fiorella, Philadelphia), then part of the Substitution crew, describes the call from DSL, 'I always came to Platinum strapped with a mic, just in case. I got a call out of the blue that their MC couldn't make it. I said, 'Hells yeah, I'll pack my bags!'

"'We realized we could use our collective weight to lean on promoters to get our music on the main stage," Dieselboy admits. 'I felt like kids were getting ripped off paying full price and having to listen to dnb on the shittiest sound system while the other kids got to hear trance, techno and house on the big system. We've come a long way in elevating respect for dnb.'

"'At first we did individual sets and tag-teamed at the end,' says AK1200. 'It evolved into a multi-setup where we do spontaneous routines. Damian usually starts and Dara or I go on after him. Then we go three records, three records, three records, with the whole night ranging from two to five hours. Our main setup is two Technics 1200s and two Pioneer CDJ-1000s with an Allen & Heath mixer, a separate Pioneer mixer with another turntable and another CDJ-1000 hooked up to an auxiliary of the main mixer. Two people are on at all times and the other is standing by.'

"'Stylistically,' says Dara, 'We're complementary. Damian plays the hardest, myself I play the mellower tunes, and Dave is somewhere in between.'

"Messinian says, 'I try to take the energy of the club to that next level, get everybody on the same page, sparking that fire that makes it go fucking bananas. We're a strong unified force.'"

== Planet of the Drums Intros ==
In 2005? the Planet of the Drums began a tradition of creating dramatic science fiction-style audio introductions to kick off their shows.

[note: preacher friend of AK1200 recorded in DJ Icey's studio;

For the 2008 POTD intro, Dieselboy hired Lynanne Zager, the computer voice in ABC's "Lost" as well as in "Fantastic Four", with sound design by SPKTRM and Dieselboy.

The POTD created their first video intro for their 2009 10th Anniversary Tour, script by Dieselboy and AK1200, sound design by Venezuelan producer Zardonic.

Dieselboy created the audio intro for the Planet of the Drums 2010 reunion at U Street Music Hall in Washington, DC on December 9, 2010. For the first time in a Planet of the Drums performance Dieselboy incorporated dubstep and drumstep into the mix. Opening for them in this Steez Promo production were Grime Syndicate, Cannon Boyz, and Headhunterz Inc.

== Major events ==
- Electric Daisy Carnival, June 26, 2011, Las Vegas, NV
- Nocturnal Festival, September 26, 2009, San Bernardino, CA
- Ultra Music Festival (Winter Music Conference, Miami, FL, 2010, 2009, 2008, 2007)
- Detroit Electronic Music Festival, May 2006, Detroit, MI
- Electric Daisy Carnival, June 26, 2004, Los Angeles, CA
- Starscape, September 27, 2003, Baltimore, MD
