= Typecell =

Drum and bass musician

Typecell (real name Guido Hoppe) is a producer of drum and bass / dubstep music and D.J. presently residing in Germany.

== Career ==
He started his career around 1992, performing under the alias DJ P.M.C. In 1996, he started producing. His first official releases were put out on his own label, Genetic Rhythm Records, and were subsequently followed by more releases on such labels as Bonzai Records / N.E.W.S., Red Alert Records, Thunderdom House Nation, as well as many others. In 2000, he created a new alter ego for himself under the name Typecell for his more experimental tracks; fusing techno and drum and bass. His reputation was built in the underground scene by utilizing a series of mix tapes and numerous innovative releases on vinyl, CDs and mp3. About 2002, he started up his long-cultivated drum and bass record label, Protogen Records, which was aimed at a more forward-thinking, club-friendly drum and bass sound.
