= Freak Recordings =

UK-based drum n bass record label

Freak Recordings is a UK-based drum and bass record label, owned and run by Dylan Hisley, which deals predominantly in heavier subgenres of drum and bass. It is affiliated with labels Obscene Recordings and Tech Itch Recordings, with the latter of whom it has formed a sub-label, Tech Freak Recordings, dedicated to the release of full-length albums. Artists include Dylan, Robyn Chaos, Audio, Limewax, Current Value, Counterstrike, Technical Itch, SPL, Basic Operations, Zardonic, Hedj, Forbidden Society, Kitech, Kantyze, and many more. Freak Recordings is also the co-founding company behind Therapy Sessions drum and bass festivals.

== See also ==
- Lists of record labels
