= Vector Burn =

American musician

Vector Burn aka Oliver Scott, is a drum and bass producer from the US. With numerous releases on drum and bass labels of note in the US and Europe, his music has been part of the burgeoning North American drum and bass scene since the turn of the millennium. Influenced by a wide range of artists and composers from within and without the realm of electronic music. He has released on Metalheadz, Barcode Recordings, Human Imprint and Force Recordings, among other labels.

A bootleg version of a remix of Future Sound Of London's "Papua New Guinea" was released on whitelabel in UK in 2004.

Along with fellow Phoenix producer Castor, he formed a politically charged drum and bass group called The Riot in 2005, with releases on Bad Habit Recordings, Barcode recordings, and Force Recordings.

After some years of absence from the drum and bass scene he released his previously unreleased material as a free album (containing 46 tracks) on the netlabel Internet Recordings in 2014.

Vector Burn's trip-hop project called "Lightning Tree" ebbed toward "Experimental depressive Hip Hop using aspects of classic jungle, soul, post-rock, trap, and shoegaze to create dusky interior soundscapes. Carrying strong '90s influences forward with sort-of new production techniques." Lightning Tree released "Mask Of Stars" LP on Herd Killing Recordings in 2014 available on iTunes, Amazon and eMusic. In 2017, Lightning Tree released an LP named "Bad Gateway" in advocacy of the organization American Civil Liberties Union (ACLU).
