= DJ Dara =

Irish drum and bass DJ

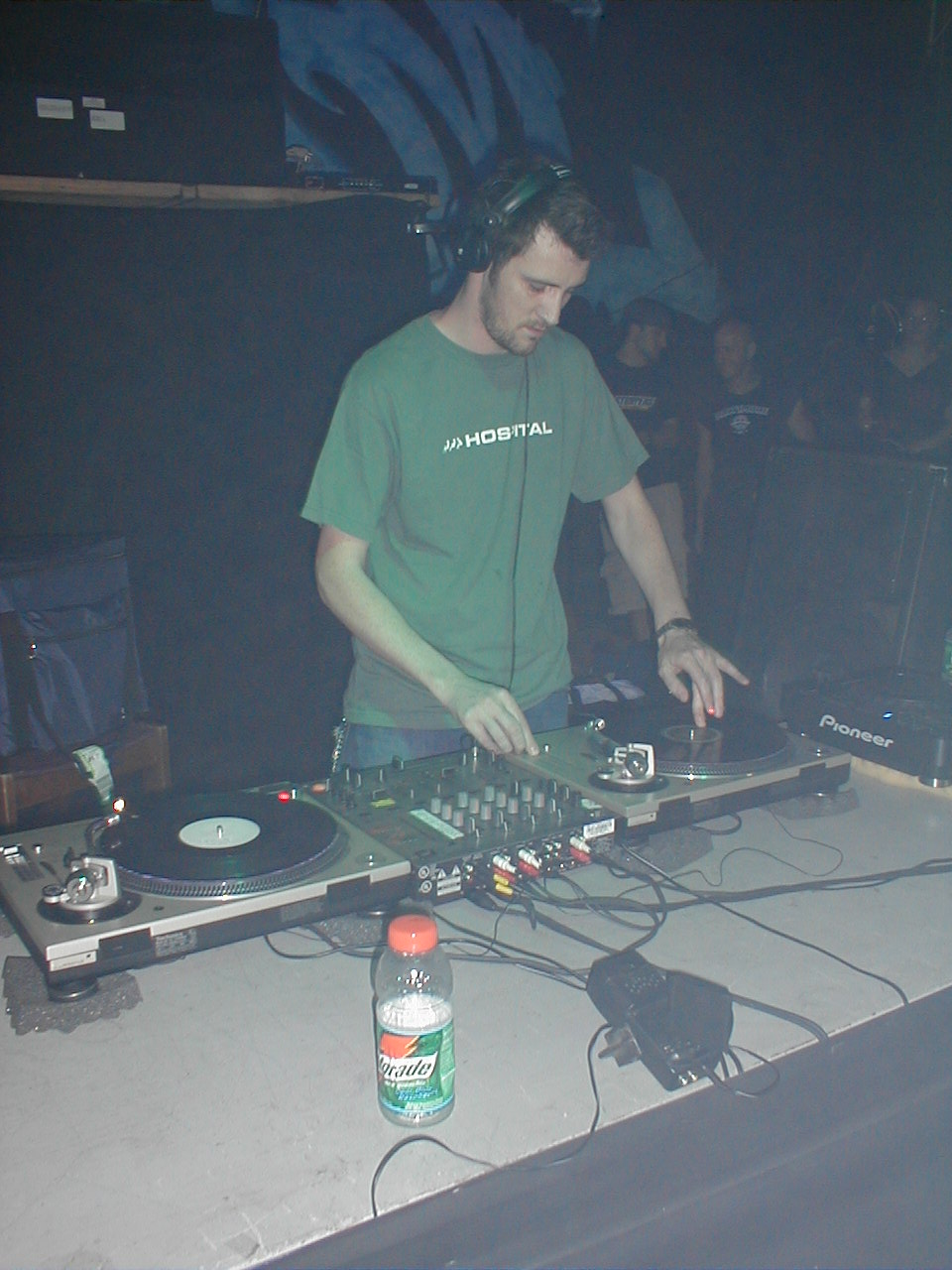
DJ Dara performs at a rave in Springfield Massachusetts.

DJ Dara (Darragh Guilfoyle, Brooklyn, New York) is an Irish drum and bass DJ who performs mainly in North America. He is also a co-founder (along with DJ DB) of Breakbeat Science, a drum & bass record label and store in New York.

He is also a member of the drum & bass group known as the Planet of the Drums.

== Discography ==
=== Albums ===
- (1997) Rinsimus Maximus (CD) – Sm:)e
- (1998) Full Circle: Drum & Bass DJ Mix (CD) – Moonshine
- (1999) Renegade Continuum Vol. 2 (CD) – Rawkus Raw Kuts
- (1999) Halfway Home (CD) – Sm:)e
- (2000) From Here to There (CD) – Moonshine
- (2001) Future Perfect (CD) – Moonshine
- (2002) Further (CD) – Moonshine
- (2003) Breakbeat Science: Exercise 01 (CD) – Breakbeat Science
- (2004) The Antidote (CD) – Breakbeat Science

=== Singles ===
- (1995) Schizophrenia (12") – Smile
