= Dieselboy =

American DJ and producer

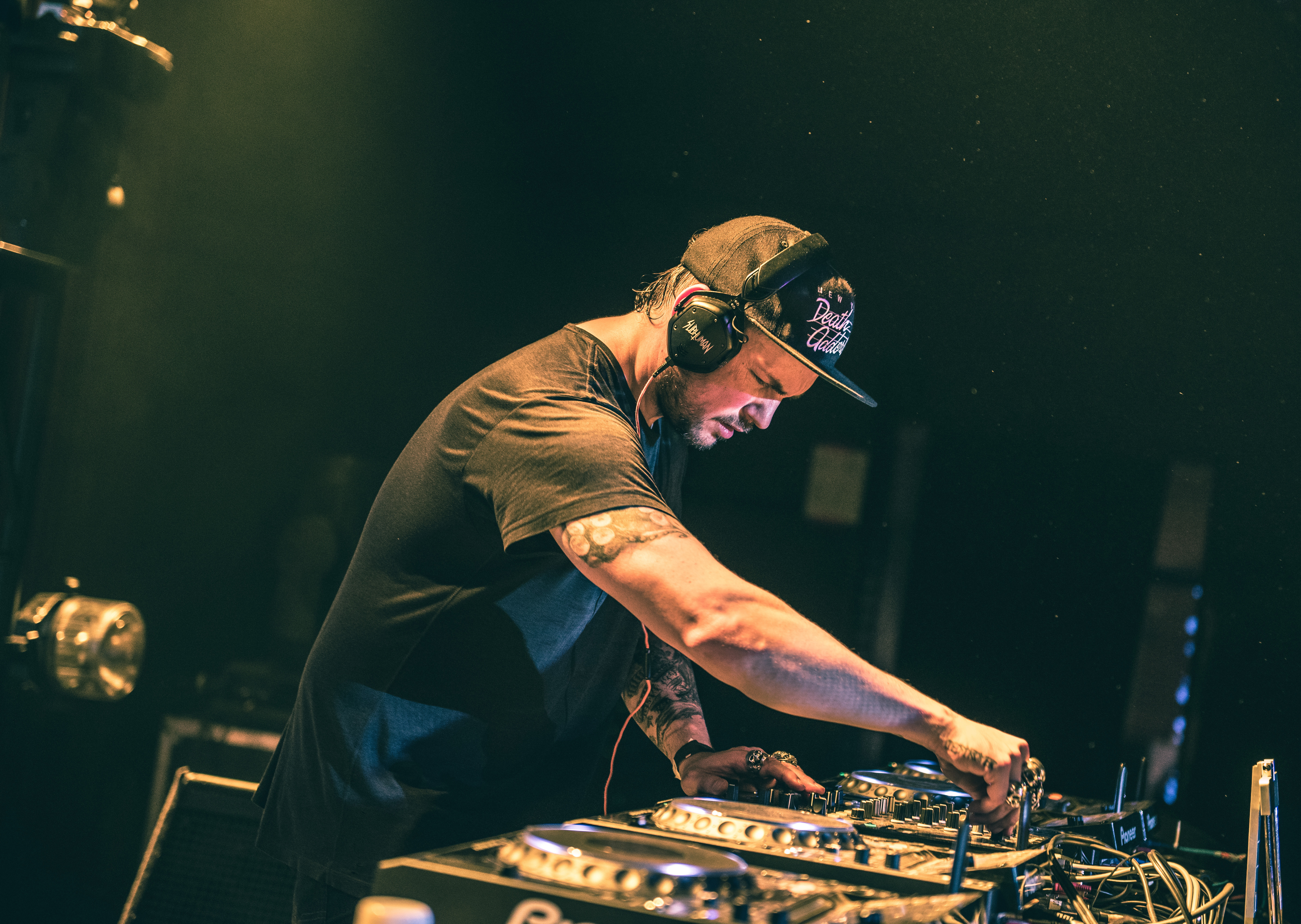
- Dieselboy performing in 2015

Background information
- Born: Damian Higgins; July 24, 1972 (age 54); Tarpon Springs, Florida, U.S.
- Genre: Drum and bass
- Occupations: DJ; record producer; label owner
- Instruments: Turntables; DJ CD players
- Years active: 1991–present

Damian Higgins (born 1972) better known by his stage name Dieselboy, is an American drum and bass DJ and music producer.

== Early life ==
Dieselboy was born Damian Higgins in Tarpon Springs, Florida in 1972. At the age of six he moved to Colorado City, Colorado, where he and his two sisters were raised by their mother. He moved with his family to Oil City, Pennsylvania, on the third day of school in the 9th grade, and is a graduate of Oil City Senior High School.

He is the eldest son of singer-songwriter Bertie Higgins.

Higgins's early musical experience included playing drums in a school marching band and DJing for high school dances.

Higgins attended the University of Pittsburgh from 1990 to 1995 where he gained additional DJing experience, and completed a degree in information science. He also played on a Carnegie Mellon University radio station (WRCT). The name Dieselboy originated from Higgins's IRC handle, "Diesel". Upon discovering a local graffiti artist shared the alias, he "made it Dieselboy."

== Career ==
=== Early career ===
In 1994, Higgins released a mixtape titled "The Future Sound of Hardcore," selling approximately 100 copies through online LISTSERV networks, which led to initial performance bookings on the East Coast. In 1996, at the request of Dan Donnelly of British Drum and bass label Suburban Base, Dieselboy did a mix called "DrumAndBass Selection USA". In 1997, Suburban Base had him follow up with 97 Octane, this time allowing him to submit track suggestions, resulting in a more varied selection. In 1998, his mix called 611 DJ Mix-series Vol. One was released. Dieselboy did the graphics for the cover. In 1998, Higgins recorded the mix ''Director's Cut'', which was packaged in physical film cans.

In 1998, Dieselboy initiated Philadelphia's first 21+ drum 'n' bass weekly Thursday club night entitled "Platinum" at club Fluid, which ended on October 14, 2004. Platinum residents included Dieselboy, Kaos, Method One, Sine, Icon, Karl K, Mason, and MC's Dub2, Messinian, Armanni Reign, Sharpness, and Illy Emcee. The club night resumed in late 2009 with performers Mason, Sine, Messinian, and Sharpness.

In 1999, Dieselboy released his fourth mix CD, "A Soldier's Story" on the Moonshine label. The album included his first original introduction track and marked his debut as a producer with "Atlantic State", co-produced with Technical Itch. His subsequent mix album, System Upgrade (2000), was also released on Moonshine. Higgins later signed with Palm Pictures and Island Recordings, releasing the tracks "The Descent", "Invid", and "Render". His double-CD mix album, The 6ixth Session, was released on Palm Pictures.

In a 2000 interview with JIVE Magazine, Dieselboy discussed his roots and the rising popularity of drum and bass music, "Well, when I started playing there wasn't drum and bass per se[sic], but I was playing stuff that was prototype drum and bass, stuff that led up to it, like early break beat and it was called dark side which is like fast dark breakbeat. I couldn't have predicted it, I definitely wanted it to become more popular, my goal was to get more people into it and open up the scene a little bit. I hold onto my goal on that...I wouldn't have predicted that it was going to be where it is, that [DNB] would be in commercials or that I was going end up DJ-ing so much."

=== Creative career ===
In January 2022, Dieselboy founded Destroyer Design, a graphic design agency offering design, creative direction, and branding services, primarily for food and beverage industry clients.

In July 2018, Dieselboy co-founded a streetwear company called Death Saves, specializing in metal and fantasy-themed apparel, in collaboration with actor Joe Manganiello. Dieselboy served as the Design Director for Death Saves.

The mixtape The Destroyer 2 featured Corey Burton, a voice actor, providing the intro vocals.

Dieselboy has been involved in various clothing collaborations, including work with NEO4IC (formerly Damascus Apparel) in San Diego.

=== Human Imprint ===
On August 13, 2023, Dieselboy hosted his inaugural drum and bass event in New York City, named 'Big Drum and Bass Party', in collaboration with promotion company Driven AM.

Dieselboy released his 93-track, 87-minute mix "Dieselboy – The Destroyer" on August 5, 2014. The mix and its art incorporate the aesthetics of his 2014 tour as Blood, Sweat and Bass with bass music producer Downlink and 1970s exploitation films. It includes a new collaboration with drum and bass producer Gridlok called "MDMX," and three tracks by Faces of Def, a new collaborative project between Dieselboy and Mark the Beast ["Blvck Celebration" with Counterstrike (SubHuman); "Carcosa" with Mayhem and Downlink (SubHuman); remix of "Tuh Tuh Duh" by Sinister Souls (PRSPCT)].

On January 31, 2014, Dieselboy and bass music artist Downlink teamed up to launch a DJ touring project known as BLOOD, SWEAT AND BASS. The duo completed five concert tours across the United States and Canada with various featured support artists.

On January 31, 2011, Dieselboy released his first new mix in two and a half years, "Dieselboy – Unleashed!", as a free download on SoundCloud. He also performed with Skrillex. In 2012 he released the mix "Wake The Dead" on SoundCloud. On May 23, 2013, Dieselboy's mix "Beyond the Black Bassline" was released by Skrillex's then new NEST HQ website.

In May 2008, Dieselboy released his ninth major mix-CD Substance D (Human Imprint), which reached the Billboard Dance/Electronic album chart. In conjunction with this release, Dieselboy initiated the "Monsters of Jungle" tour with rotating Human Imprint label artists including Evol Intent, Ewun, Demo, Mayhem, SPKTRM, Infiltrata and MC Messinian.

In 2006, Dieselboy released his first Human Imprint compilation called "The HUMAN Resource". Disc One Selected Works, is a 12-song un-mixed selection. Disc Two Evol Intent Assemble the Monster features a continuous DJ-mix from Evol Intent.

In the summer of 2000, Dieselboy contributed to the formation of the drum and bass DJ crew called "Planet of the Drums", alongside AK1200, DJ Dara, and MC Messinian.

=== SubHuman ===
In July 2009, Human Imprint parted amicably from System Recordings. In summer 2010, Human relaunched with Steve Gordon of Steez Promo and Circle Management as new co-owner with Dieselboy, and they created the SubHuman for dubstep and electro releases.

On New Year's Eve 2009, Higgins performed a three-hour multi-genre set including drum and bass, dubstep, and electro at an event in Washington, D.C. He continued using this open format layout through 2010.

== Culinary career ==
In 2014, Higgins began participating in commercial kitchen events following his work as a culinary writer for the website FirstWeFeast.com. He cooked a sold-out collaboration dinner with respected chefs Matt McCallister and Alex Stupak at FT33 restaurant in Dallas on June 9, 2014. Dieselboy competed in a nacho battle against chef Alex Stupak at Empellón Cocina in New York in February 2013, which he lost. He came back to face off against chefs Alex Stupak, Michael Anthony, Wylie Dufresne and Seamus Mullen in February 2014, beating Mullen.

Dieselboy assisted chefs Dave Beran (Chicago), Daniel Patterson (San Francisco), and Christina Tosi (New York City) at an Art Basel dinner hosted by Questlove in Miami on December 6, 2014.

In November 2014, Dieselboy's cooking was featured at his first "pop-up" event called "Burger Night with Dieselboy" at the Groningen, Netherlands restaurant De Boom, preceding his DJ performance at Subsonic nightclub. In January 2015, another pop-up hamburger event took place at P60 cafe in Amstelveen, Netherlands as a prelude to his DJ gig at the P60 club.

In 2012, Dieselboy was a co-presenter with mixologist Jim Meehan (PDT, New York City) and chef/designer Taavo Somer at the Origins and Frontiers mixology workshop at the 7th Annual StarChefs.com International Chefs Congress in New York City. Dieselboy's cocktail "The Higgins" is published in The New York Times' cocktail writer Robert Simonson's 2014 book The Old-Fashioned (Ten Speed Press).

Dieselboy collaborated with Betony restaurant chef Bryce Shuman on a limited edition hot dog as part of a monthlong "musicians and chefs" special menu at the New York City cocktail lounge PDT in May 2015. On August 9, 2015 as part of the Moonrise Festival in Baltimore, Maryland, Dieselboy and The Glitch Mob hosted a Taco Party for contest winners.

== Awards and recognition ==
Dieselboy placed 23rd in the 2014 America's Best DJ Poll, up 19 places from the previous year's 42nd position, between Moby and BT.

On February 12, 2012, Skrillex cited Dieselboy during his acceptance speech for the Grammy Award for Best Remixed Recording, Non-Classical, referencing the saying "All the boats rise with the water."

In 1998, Dieselboy was the first American drum & bass DJ to be nominated for Best Drum & Bass DJ at the Global DJ Mix Awards, tying with LTJ Bukem.

== Personal life ==
Dieselboy has a son with his ex-partner Jackie Carnesi, born in 2018.

== Discography ==
=== Mix compilations ===
Drum And Bass Selection USA (CD) – Suburban Base (Moonshine) (11/11/1996)
Mixed by Dieselboy
01. Macca featuring Tempo – Everyday
02. Ill Figure – Jam Hot
03. The Dream Team – Rollin' Numbers (The Joker Remix)
04. Rude Bwoy Monty – Steppa Style
05. Remarc – In Da Hood
06. The Dream Team – Raw Dogs (Re-Lick)
07. Shy FX – Funkindemup
08. DJ Nut Nut – Now Listen
09. Dope Skillz – 6 Million Ways
10. 45 Roller – Shotz
11. Pascal – Reality
12. Marvellous Cain – Da Power
13. Ed Rush – Check Me Out
14. Undercover Agent – Dub Plate Circles
15. Apollo 13 – Let It Roll
16. Pascal – Movin' On
97 Octane (CD) – Moonshine (1997)

Mixed by Dieselboy
01. D'Cruze (feat. Shelly Nelson) – Land Speeder
02. IQ Collective – Mode 1
03. Shimon & Andy C – Night Flight
04. The Dream Team – Switch
05. Swoosh – Ya Rockin'
06. Substance – L.F.Ant
07. The Joker – Punx
08. Ill Figure – Style
09. Swift – Twisted
10. Swift – Analogue
11. Future Forces Inc – Synthesis
12. Decoder – Twister

13. M.T.S. – Instigator
Sixeleven DJ Mixseries, Vol. 1 (CD) – Sixeleven (611) Records (1997)

Mixed by Dieselboy
01. Hoax – The More I See You (Urban Flavour Remix)
02. D.T. – Serious
03. E-Z Rollers – Tough At The Top (Origin Unknown Remix)
04. Concept 2 – Unlock The Secrets
05. Dom & Matrix – Footsteps
06. Facs – Rupture v 07. Technical Itch – Hidden Sound (Dom & Roland Remix)
08. Solar Nine – Audio Distortion
09. Embee – The Power
10. Secret Methods – Animation
11. Swift – Mission
12. Decoder & Mark Caro – EKO
13. Decoder – Dhr
14. The Vagrant – Space Boogie

15. Sharp Scientific – Stratocruiser
A Soldier's Story (CD) – Moonshine (1999)

Mixed by Dieselboy
01. Dieselboy – Intro: Precautionary Procedure
02. Konflict – The Beckoning
03. Usual Suspects & Fierce – Sawn Off
04. DJ Friction – Photon (Remix)
05. Future Cut & Marcus Intalex – Plastic
06. Technical Itch – Deception
07. Technical Itch – Stack
08. Moving Fusion – Sexdrive
09. Jonny L – The Bells
10. Usual Suspects & Loxy – Stalker
11. Vertigo – The Drained
12. Danny Breaks – Dissonance
13. Peshay – Vegas
14. Kosheen – Yes Men (Decoder Remix)
15. Technical Itch & Dieselboy – Atlantic State

16. Decoder – BS9
System Upgrade (CD) – Moonshine (2000)

Mixed by Dieselboy
01. Dieselboy – Loading Program
02. Ram Trilogy – Mindscan (Ed Rush & Optical Remix)
03. E-Sassin – Symptom
04. Hive – Ultrasonic Sound (Dillinja Remix)
05. Biostacis – Brain Hack
06. Dom & Roland – Can't Punish Me
07. Decoder – Road Rage
08. Future Cut – Overload
09. Kemal & Rob Data – Konspiracy (VIP Mix)
10. Kraken – Side Effects (Stakka & Skynet Remix)
11. Dieselboy – The Descent (Decoder Remix)
12. Jonny L – Selecta
13. Decoder – Dumb!
14. Facs & B-Key – Antics
15. Technical Itch – Deadline
16. Bad Company – Sentient

17. Absolute Zero & Subphonics – The Code (Usual Suspects VIP Mix)
The 6ixth Session (2xCD) – Palm Pictures (2000)

Disc One (mixed by Dieselboy)
01. "Initialize" – Dieselboy vs. Atlantiq
02. "The Messiah" – Kemal & Rob Data
03. "Heavy Metal" – Technical Itch
04. "Nanobugs" – Signal to Noise
05. "Bios Fear" – Underfire vs. Negative
06. "Homicide" – Future Cut & Futurebound
07. "Shrapnel (Stakka & Skynet Remix)" – Usual Suspects
08. "Firewire" – Andy C & Shimon
09. "Toxin" – )EIB(
10. "Invid (E-Sassin VIP)" – Dieselboy
11. "The Descent" (Phunckateck VIP) – Dieselboy
12. "Pusher" – Technical Itch
13. "Eclipse" – Loxy & Dylan
14. "Plimsoul VIP" – Facs & C-Key
15. "Space Age Remix" – Teebee
16. "Dominion" – Dylan
17. "Solarize" – J Majik
Disc Two
Dieselboy – Invid
Dieselboy – Render
Dieselboy – The Descent
Dieselboy – Invid (E-Sassin VIP)

Dieselboy – The Descent (Phunckateck Communications VIP)
projectHUMAN (2xCD) – Human Imprint Recordings (2002)

Disc 1 (Mixed by Dieselboy)
01. Dieselboy & Joshua Ryan – Genesis
02. Optical & Ryme Tyme – Shapecharge
03. Styles Of Beyond – Subculture (Dieselboy & Kaos VIP Mix)
04. Funk Parlor – Something For The Dancefloor (Stakka & Skynet Remix)
05. Stratus – You Must Follow (Dieselboy & Kaos Remix)
06. Stakka & Skynet (feat. DJ Friction) – Altitude (Ryme Tyme & Fierce VIP Mix)
07. Dylan & Ink – California Curse (Technical Itch Remix)
08. Billy Lo – Carjackers (Ram Trilogy Remix)
09. Robbie Rivera – Harder & Faster (Weapon & E-Sassin Remix)
10. Kemal & Rob Data – Hostile
11. Usual Suspects & Loxy – Stalker (Danny C Remix)
12. Rob & Goldie – The Shadow (Hive VIP Mix)
13. Dom & Roland – Soundwall (VIP Mix)
14. Dom & Optical – Quadrant 6 (E-Sassin VIP Mix)
15. Rascal & Klone – Terminal Velocity
16. Technical Itch – Reborn (Weapon Remix)
17. Bad Company – Mind Games
18. Dieselboy & Joshua Ryan – Revelations

Disc 2
01. Stratus – You Must Follow
02. Styles Of Beyond – Subculture (Dylan & Ink Remix)
03. Decoder – Tension (Usual Suspects Remix)
04. Hive – Surreal Uncut (TeeBee Remix)
05. Joshua Ryan – Pistolwhip (Stratus Remix)

06. Danny Breaks – The Bear (Universal Project Remix)
DJ World Series: D & B From The United States (CD) – DJ Magazine (2003)

Mixed by Dieselboy
0 Intro
01. Kaos, Karl K & Jae Kennedy* – Vice
02. Stratus – You Must Follow (Dieselboy & Kaos Remix)
03. Kaos, Karl K & Jae Kennedy* – Rush
04. Ecco & Sabotage* – House Music
05. DJ Rap & Danny C – The Riff
06. Kaos, Karl K & Jae Kennedy* – Soul On Fire
07. Juju – Salty Dub
08. Mason (2) & D.Star* – Zerosum Breakout
09. Black Sun Empire – Smoke (Sinthetix Remix)
10. Hive & Juju – Ghettobird
11. Bad Company – Mass Hysteria (Hive Remix)
12. Kaos, Karl K & Jae Kennedy* – Moonraker
13. Bad Company – Grunge 3 (Dieselboy, Kaos & Karl K Remix)
14. Hive & Echo – Death Valley
Additional Track Hints
01. Kaos, Karl K & Jae Kennedy – Houston
02. Hive -Neo

03. Kaos, Karl K & Jae Kennedy – Athenaeum
The Dungeonmaster's Guide (2xCD) – Human Imprint Recordings (2004)

Disc One (mixed by Dieselboy)
01. "Prologue" – Dieselboy
02. "End of the World" – Cartridge
03. "Accelerate" – Break
04. "Soul on Fire (Concord Dawn Remix)" – Kaos + Karl K + Jae Kennedy
05. "White" – Basic Operations
06. "The Hand (Dungeonmaster's Exclusive)" – Tech Itch
07. "Infection (E-Sassin Remix)" – Raiden
08. "Immortal (Kaos + Karl K Remix" – Sasha
09. "Evil Acid (Gridlok Remix)" – Wink
10. "Follow the Leader" – Teebee + Calyx
11. "Knowledge of Self (Evil Intent Remix)" – BT
12. "Flightpath" – Dub Faction
13. "Doorway (Gridlok + Echo Remix)" – Usual Suspects
14. "Moulin Rouge (Dieselboy + Kaos + Karl K Remix)" – Dom + Kemal
15. "Flight 643 (Paul B + Subwave Remix)" – Tiësto
16. "Take Me Away (Ill Skillz Remix)" – Concord Dawn
17. "Contrax (Weapon Remix)" – Decorum
18. "Human (Ill Skillz Remix)" – Dumonde
Disc Two
01. "Adventure Unfold" – Dieselboy'
02. "Moonraker (Gridlok Remix)" – Kaos + Karl K + Jae Kennedy
03. "Houston (KC Remix)" – Kaos + Karl K + Jae Kennedy
04. "You Must Follow (Evil Intent VIP)" – Stratus
05. "Xanadu (Stratus Remix)" – Kaos + Karl K + Jae Kennedy

06. "Studio 54 (Basic Operations Remix)" – Kaos + Karl K + Jae Kennedy
Dieselboy Presents: The HUMAN Resource (2xCD) – Human Imprint Recordings (2006)
(CD1: mix by Evol Intent)
Substance D (2xCD) – Human Imprint Recordings (2008)
no info

=== Singles ===
- Patriot Games EP (2x12") – Tech Itch Recordings
- The Descent (12") – Palm Pictures (1999)
- The Trans-Atlantic Link Part 1 (12") – Tech Itch Recordings
- Invid (12") – Palm Pictures (2000)
- Render (12") – Palm Pictures (2000)
- Invid (Remixes) (2x12") – Palm Pictures (2002)
- Barrier Break/Submission (2X12") – (Dieselboy & Kaos) Human Imprint (11/17/03)
- N/V/D (12") – Dieselboy (Counterstrike Zentraedi remix) Human Imprint (5/8/08)
- Midnight Express (12") – Dieselboy + Evol Intent + Ewun, Human Imprint (5/15/08)
- Get Back (CD) – Blokhe4d & Dieselboy, Unique Artists (2010)
- Murder Machine Feat Dieselboy (Digital) – Bare & Mark Instinct, Human Imprint (SUBHM 012, 7/18/2011)
- W.M.F.D. (Digital) – Dieselboy & Bare, Human Imprint (HUMA 8035, 6/20/2012)
- Beyond Thunderdome (Digital) – Dieselboy & Bare, Human Imprint (HUMA 8037, 7/17/2012)
- MDMX (Digital) – Gridlok feat. Dieselboy, Project 51 (P5130, 8/25/2014)
- Blvck Celebration (Digital) – Faces of Def (Dieselboy & Mark The Beast) & Counterstrike, Human Imprint (SUBHM 038, 9/30/2014)
- Carcosa (Digital) – Dieselboy, Downlink, Mark The Beast & Mayhem, Human Imprint (SUPA 01, 5/12/2015)
- Angel Dust (Digital) – Dieselboy & Mark The Beast, Human Imprint (HUMA 8040, 1/30/2017)
- Demolition (Digital) – Dieselboy, Bare & Mark The Beast feat Armanni Reign, Human Imprint (SUBHM 044, 9/4/2017)
- Stagediver (Digital) – Dieselboy, Mark The Beast & Counterstrike, Human Imprint (HUMA 8042, 6/29/2018)

=== Mixtapes / DJ Mixes ===
- Future Sound Of Hardcore (1994)
- Witness The Strength (1995)
- Supreme (1995)
- East Coast Science 1 with Scott Henry (1996)
- East Coast Science 2 with Scott Henry (1997)
- East Coast Science 3 with Scott Henry (1998)
- Director’s Cut (1998)
- DJ Magazine World Series (2003)
- Live At The Jungle Room (2005)
- Unleashed! (2011)
- Live At Beta (2012)
- Wake The Dead (2012)
- Beyond The Black Bassline (2013)
- The Destroyer (2014)
- The Destroyer 2 - Extinction Event (2016)
- Planet Of The Drums - Awakening (2017)
- Heart Of Darkness (2019)
- Live At EDC (2019)
- Heavy Breathing (2021)
- BBC Radio 1 Drum & Bass Show Guest Mix (2021)

=== Substance D ===
- Dieselboy + Ewun - Warning Label
- Demo - Trauma/Cell (SPKTRM Duomix)
- Limewax - One Of Them (Current Value Remix)
- Technical Itch - Pressure Drop VIP
- Technical Itch + Kemal - The Calling (Evol Intent + Ewun Remix)
- Psidream - Death Sentence
- Freeland - We Want Your Soul (Raiden Remix)
- Dieselboy + Evol Intent + Ewun - Midnight Express
- SPKTRM - Machine March
- Current Value - Fear / Machine (Demo Duomix)
- Demo - O.D.
- The Upbeats - SFX
- Counterstrike - Timewarp VIP
- MSTRKRFT - Paris (The Upbeats Remix)
- Computer Club - Load Rocket (Gridlok Remix)
- Meat Beat Manifesto - Helter Skelter (Evol Intent + Mayhem Remix)
- Dieselboy - N/V/D (Counterstrike Zentraedi Remix)

=== The Human Resource ===
==== Disc One: Selected Works ====
- Vector Burn – Paradise Lost (D-Star Remix)
- ƆƐI3C – Mass Hysteria (Hive Remix)
- Kaos + Karl K + Jae Kennedy – Houston
- Styles Of Beyond – Subculture (Upbeats Remix)
- DJ Fresh – Wargames '03
- Skynet – Catherine Wheel
- Evol Intent + Ewun – The Rapture
- ƆƐI3C* – Grunge 3 (Dieselboy + Kaos + Karl K Remix)
- Dieselboy + Kaos Feat. Messinian – Barrier Break (Infiltrata + Hochi Remix)
- Evol Intent + Mayhem (7) + Thinktank (3) – Broken Sword
- Dieselboy + Kaos – Submission
- Kaos + Karl K + Jae Kennedy – Studio 54

==== Disc Two: Evol Intent Assemble The Monster ====
- Evol Intent + Dieselboy – Vivify
- Infiltrata + Define – Parallel Universe
- Evol Intent + Mayhem (7) + Thinktank (3) – Broken Sword
- Upbeats – Piss Fiend
- Kaos + Karl K + Jae Kennedy – Moonraker (Gridlok Remix)
- Evol Intent + Mayhem (7) + Psidream – Assimilation
- Styles Of Beyond – Subculture (Upbeats Remix)
- Kaos + Karl K + Jae Kennedy – Xanadu (Stratus Remix)
- DJ Fresh* – Wargames '03
- ƆƐI3C* – Mass Hysteria (Hive Remix)
- Dieselboy + Kaos – Barrier Break
- Dieselboy + Kaos – Barrier Break (Infiltrata + Hochi Remix)
- Evol Intent + Ewun – Reality Check
- Upbeats* – Le Mammoth
- Evol Intent + Ewun – The Rapture
- BT – Knowledge Of Self (Evol Intent Remix)
- ƆƐI3C* – Grunge 3 (Diesleboy + Kaos + Karl K Remix)
- Ewun – The Divide
- Stratus – You Must Follow (Anthology)
- Dieselboy + Technical Itch – Atlantic State (Gridlok Remix)
- Dieselboy + Kaos – Submission
- Sasha – Fundamental (Gridlok Remix)
- BT – The Great Escape (Alliance Remix)

=== Remixes ===
- Hard Times – Baby Namboos (Dieselboy + Decoder) Palm Pictures (2000)
- Opticon – Orgy (Dieselboy + Technical Itch Arena mix) Reprise (2001)
- Subculture – Styles of Beyond (Dieselboy + Kaos VIP) Human Imprint (2002)
- You Must Follow – Stratus (Dieselboy + Kaos) Human Imprint (2003)
- Grunge 3 – Bad Company UK (Dieselboy, Kaos + Karl K) Human Imprint (2003)
- Moulin Rouge – Dom + Roland (Dieselboy, Kaos + Karl K) Human Imprint (2005)
- Hooked – Dom + Gridlok (Tech Itch + Dieselboy) Project 51 (P51UK10, 8.7.2006)
- Tuh Tuh Duh – Sinister Souls (feat. Dieselboy feat. Mark the Beast) PRSPCT (PRSPCTRMXEP001,1.28.2015)
- No Control – Bro Safari, UFO! & Beauty Brain (Dieselboy + Mark The Beast Remix) Free Download (2015)

=== Videogames ===
- Amplitude : Styles of Beyond – Subculture (Dieselboy & Kaos Rock Remix)
- Crackdown : Dieselboy & Kaos – Barrier Break
- Gran Turismo 4 : Dieselboy & Kaos & Karl K (feat. Messinian) – Nitro
- Need for Speed: Most Wanted : Dieselboy & Kaos – Barrier Break
- Saints Row : Styles of Beyond – Subculture (Dieselboy & Kaos Remix)
- Lawbreakers: Dieselboy & Mark The Beast – Abaddon / Dieselboy & Mark The Beast - Sunshine

=== Compilation appearances ===
- Opticon – Orgy (Dieselboy + Technical Itch Arena Mix) (2001) on Orgy: Opticon Remixes (12") – Reprise Records
- Opticon – Orgy (Dieselboy + Technical Itch Arena Dub Mix) (2001) on Orgy: Opticon Remixes (12") – Reprise Records
- Grunge 3 – Bad Company UK (Dieselboy, Kaos + Karl K) HUMAN (2003) on Andy C: Nightlife (CD) – Ram Records (2003)
- Get Back – Blokhe4d + Dieselboy on Unique Artists: Volume 1 – Unique Artists (UA001CD, 8/23/2010)

== Filmography ==
- Put the Needle on the Record (2004)
- American Massive (2002)
- Atlantic State (Technical Itch + Dieselboy), Sounds & Motion: V. 01 (Ukraine, 2002)
- Moonshine Over America (2000)

== Literature ==
- Dieselboy is featured in Michaelangelo Matos' book "The Underground Is Massive: How Electronic Dance Music Conquered America" (2015)

== See also ==
- Human Imprint
- SubHuman : Human Imprint
