= Limewax =

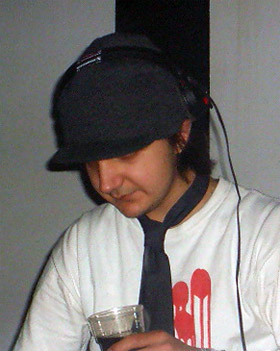
- Limewax performing at Therapy Sessions UK

Background information
- Birth name: Maxim Anokhin
- Born: 1988 (age 36–37)
- Origin: Kamianets-Podilskyi, Ukraine
- Genres: Drum and bass, Hardstep, Darkstep, Skullstep, Techstep, Breakcore
- Occupation(s): Producer, Composer, DJ
- Years active: 2005 - present
- Labels: L/B; Lost Soul Recordings; Yellow-Stripe; Position Chrome; Freak Recordings; Tech Itch; Obscene; Avalanche, Sinuous; Prspct; Bastard Child; Tech Freak

Maxim Anokhin (born 1988), known by his stage name Limewax is a Ukrainian drum and bass music producer and DJ from Kamianets-Podilskyi, Ukraine. His style is described as inspired by harsher sounds of hardstep and darkstep; however, he is most recognizable as a Skullstep artist. He has collaborated with artists such as The Panacea, Current Value, Donny, Proket, and Dylan.

Anokhin began composing music shortly after moving to Tilburg, Netherlands in 1999. At the age of seventeen, he released his first EP, Changing Crisis, on high-profile label Tech Itch Recordings in 2005. As a result, Anokhin became notable for emerging into the electronic music industry at a young age, and quickly gained popularity leading to performances at Therapy Sessions events worldwide.

In 2024, DJ Mag referred to Anokhin as "an icon in the hard drum & bass scene" in their coverage of his work.

== Discography ==
- Selecta / Equivalent (2015, Prspct) (with Cooh)
- Lumpeth / Various Castrations (2014, Yellow Stripe)
- Arsch Noisyum / Dirty Hand Of Gandolf (2014, Prspct)
- Ridget (2013, Prspct)
- Jij / Fünf (2012, Position Chrome)
- Empfindsamer Stil LP (2011, LB Recordings)
- All Ends EP (2010, LB Recordings)
- Cracking Core (Tech Itch VIP) (2009, Penetration Recordings)
- Big Bang / Invention (2009, Freak Recordings)
- Uncomes (Blood & Steel LP) (2009, Prspct)
- The Remixes (2008, Lost Soul Recordings) (with SPL)
- Kristall Weizen EP (2008, Tech Itch Recordings)
- Perevorot (The Firm LP) (2008, Offkey Recordings) (with Proket)
- Zombie Vs Zombie / Casino (2008, Position Chrome)
- The Limewax EP - Part Three (2008, Lost Soul Recordings)
- The Golden Path Remix (The First Movement) (2008, Freak MP3)
- Everything (Dylan & Limewax VIP) (2008, Freak MP3)
- Cracking Core (Tech Itch VIP) (VIP Remix Part I) (2008, Tech Itch Digital)
- Romance Explosion EP (2008, Freak Recordings)
- Tempest / Bathwater (2008, LB Recordings) (with Current Value)
- Empire EP (2008, Position Chrome (with The Panacea)
- Nature Of Evil / Impaler (2008, Habit Recordings)
- Ethio (2008, Infiltrata Recordings) (with Infiltrata)
- Last Call (Future Filth EP), (2008, Prospect Recordings)
- Slave For Life VIP Unreleased Remix (2007, Freak MP3)
- Share No Soul (Freak Family Drum Circle Explosion LP) (2007, Freak Recordings)
- Strike From The Land (2007, Freak MP3)
- The Limewax EP - Part Two (2007, Lost Soul Recordings)
- Agent Orange / Cat And The Hat (2007, LB Recordings)
- The Limewax EP - Part One (2007, Lost Soul Recordings)
- Golden Path / Evolution (2007, Obscene Recordings)
- Scars On The Horizon LP (2007, Tech Freak Recordings)
- Cleansed By A Nightmare (2007, Bastard Child Recordings)
- We Have Life EP (2006, Freak Recordings) (with SPL)
- M.O.T.D / Invasion (2006, Obscene Recordings)
- Half LB / The Way The Future (2006, Avalanche)
- Killing Machine (Jezuz Road) (From Beyond The Grave EP) (2006, Algorythm) (with Counterstrike featuring SPL)
- Pain (2005, Prspct)
- The Lawra / Eyes Of Evil (2005, Freak Recordings)
- Sure Vision (2005, Sinuous)
- Satanina / Emato (2005, Obscene Recordings)
- Ritual Situation / The Limit (2005, Avalanche)
- Changing Crisis EP (2005, Tech Itch Recordings)
- Life Of Sin Remix (2005, Penetration Records)
