= Evol Intent =

- Origin: Atlanta, Georgia, U.S.
- Genres: Drum and bass, hardstep, neurofunk, hip hop, IDM
- Years active: 2000–present
- Labels: Barcode; Evol Intent; Human Imprint; Lifted Music; Outbreak Records; Renegade Hardware
- Members: Mike Diasio (Gigantor); Ashley Jones (The Enemy); Nick Weiller (Knick)
- Website: evolintent.com

Evol Intent is a hardstep drum and bass group formed in Tuscaloosa, Alabama and Atlanta, Georgia, U.S. in 2000. The group is composed of The Enemy (Ashley Jones), Knick (Nick Weiller), and Gigantor (Mike Diasio).

The trio has released several singles on their own label Evol Intent Recordings as well as Dieselboy's Human Imprint and Barcode Recordings, and performed as headliners for several Therapy Sessions events. They are also known for their contributions with Lifted Music Group.

In 2005, Evol Intent provided a continuous mix for the second CD of Dieselboy's compilation The Human Resource.

In 2006, Evol Intent were selected by Submerged to be part of a groundbreaking drum 'n' bass-jazz fusion project he was working on with Grammy Award-winning jazz bassist, record producer and fusion pioneer Bill Laswell. Evol Intent provided the blueprint for a track over which NEA Jazz Masters saxophonist Dave Liebman improvised, resulting in the finished track "Pattern Engine" which was released on the Method of Defiance album "Inamorata." The album was re-released in 2008.

Evol Intent released their debut artist album Era of Diversion in 2008, revealing their versatility as producers with tracks ranging from various subgenres of drum and bass to punk rock to IDM.

Ashley Jones also produces disco house music under the alias Treasure Fingers, Michael Diasio produces Electro House under the alias Computer Club, while Nick Weiller currently produces moombahton, trap, and dubstep under the moniker Bro Safari, and co-produced under the moniker of Ludachrist with Jake Stanczak aka Kill the Noise.

== Discography ==
=== Albums ===
- Era of Diversion (2008)

=== EPs ===
- Cruise Control EP (2011)
- Animal EP (2013)
- Under the Radar EP (2014)
- REVOLT EP (2016)

== See also ==
- History of drum and bass
