= The 6ixth Session =

Compilation album (Mix)
- Released: 2000
- Genre: Drum and bass
- Label: Palm Pictures
- Compiler: Dieselboy

Dieselboy chronology
Invid / Invid (Remix) (2000)	The 6ixth Session (2000)	Patriot Games EP (2000)

The 6ixth Session is a drum and bass compilation album mixed by Dieselboy, and included for the first time a second unmixed CD of complete original tracks. It was released by Palm Pictures on March 28, 2000. The 6ixth Session featured a cyborg-themed mix described by the Washington Post as “hard-edged hyperdriven dance music.” This project marked the beginning of Dieselboy's VIP remix phase. The cover is a CGI generated image of the side of a robot's head.

== Track listing ==
Disc One

1. "Initialize" - Dieselboy vs. Atlantiq
2. "The Messiah" - Kemal & Rob Data
3. "Heavy Metal" - Technical Itch
4. "Nanobugs" - Signal to Noise
5. "Bios Fear" - Underfire vs. Negative
6. "Homicide" - Future Cut & Futurebound
7. "Shrapnel (Stakka & Skynet Remix)" - Usual Suspects
8. "Firewire" - Andy C & Shimon
9. "Toxin" - Bad Company
10. "Invid (E-Sassin VIP)" - Dieselboy
11. "The Descent (Phunckateck VIP) - Dieselboy
12. "Pusher" - Technical Itch
13. "Eclipse" - Loxy & Dylan
14. "Plimsoul VIP" - Facs & B-Key
15. "Space Age Remix" - Teebee
16. "Dominion" - Dylan
17. "Solarize" - J Majik

Disc Two

1. Dieselboy - Invid
2. Dieselboy - Render
3. Dieselboy - The Descent
4. Dieselboy - Invid (E-Sassin VIP)
5. Dieselboy - The Descent (Phunckateck VIP)
