= Underworld 1992–2002 =

1992–2002

Greatest hits album by Underworld
- Released: 3 November 2003
- Recorded: 1992–2002
- Genre: Techno; house; trance; electronica
- Length: 153:42
- Label: JBO; V2
- Producer: Rick Smith

Underworld chronology
A Hundred Days Off (2002)	1992–2002 (2003)	Riverrun (2005–2006)

Professional ratings
Review scores
Source	Rating
AllMusic	4/5 stars
About.com	5/5 stars
Almost Cool	8/10
Entertainment Weekly	A−
Music Emissions	5/5 stars
NME	8/10
PopMatters	favorable
Uncut	3/5 stars

1992–2002 is a double disc compilation album by Underworld, released 3 November 2003 on JBO. The album was released in conjunction with the single "Born Slippy .NUXX 2003".

== Summary ==
1992–2002 marked the first album appearances of "Big Mouth" (listed here as "Bigmouth"), "Dirty", "Rez" and "Spikee"; all of which had previously only been available as 12" vinyl singles. The version of "Born Slippy .NUXX" included on this compilation is an exclusive edit of the song with a new outro, while "Push Upstairs" is an extended mix that was limited to a 12" promotional vinyl on its original release in 1999. "Cowgirl" appears in the lightly edited form which appeared on Dubnobasswithmyheadman. The full length "album version" of "Moaner" is also included, as opposed to the "long version" used on Beaucoup Fish, which cut the extended outro (this compilation's version of "Moaner" does not fade out, unlike other copies of the "album version"). The original versions of "Dark & Long" and "Born Slippy" were not included on the compilation. A promotional version of 1992–2002 also included the unedited version of "Dirty" and a previously unreleased extended version of "Jumbo", the latter of which would later appear on 1992–2012 The Anthology.

Notably, half of the tracks on 1992–2002 are songs that were used as part of film soundtracks. These are: "Dark & Long (Dark Train)" and "Born Slippy .NUXX", both used in the film Trainspotting; "Rez", as used in Vanilla Sky; "Cowgirl" from Hackers; "Pearl's Girl" as heard in The Saint; "Moaner" from Batman & Robin; "Shudder/King of Snake", as used in Biutiful; and "8 Ball", which was featured in The Beach and the only song in the entire set that was not released as its own proper single.

Tim Booth of James has ranked it among his favourite albums.

== Track listing ==
All songs by Underworld, unless noted.

=== CD version ===
Disc one
No.	Title	Length
1.	"Bigmouth" (originally released under artist name Lemon Interupt)	10:07
2.	"Dirty" (originally released under artist name Lemon Interupt)	10:18
3.	"Mmm... Skyscraper I Love You"	13:15
4.	"Rez"	9:57
5.	"Spikee"	12:30
6.	"Dirty Epic"	9:59
7.	"Dark & Long (Dark Train)"	10:51
Total length:		76:57

Disc two
No.	Title	Writer(s)	Length
1.	"Cowgirl"		8:29
2.	"Born Slippy .NUXX"		7:34
3.	"Pearl's Girl"		9:39
4.	"Jumbo"		6:58
5.	"Push Upstairs"		6:10
6.	"Moaner"		10:23
7.	"Shudder/King of Snake"	Pete Bellotte, Giorgio Moroder, Donna Summer	9:30
8.	"8 Ball"		8:55
9.	"Two Months Off"		9:08
Total length:			76:46

Disc three (DVD)
No.	Title	Length
1.	"Rez"	9:54
2.	"Dark Train"	9:55
3.	"Born Slippy Nuxx"	4:31
4.	"Jumbo"	4:10
5.	"Two Months Off"	3:59

=== Promotional pressing ===
A very small number of releases contained extended versions of "Dirty" (which includes a coda that contains a sample from "Dolls' Polyphony", from the soundtrack to the anime film Akira) and of "Jumbo" (which was later given a wide release on 1992–2012 The Anthology.)

Disc one
No.	Title	Length
1.	"Bigmouth"	10:07
2.	"Dirty"	11:37
3.	"Mmm... Skyscraper I Love You"	13:15
4.	"Rez"	9:57
5.	"Spikee"	12:30
6.	"Dirty Epic"	9:59
7.	"Dark & Long (Dark Train)"	10:51

Disc two
No.	Title	Writer(s)	Length
1.	"Cowgirl"		8:29
2.	"Born Slippy .NUXX"		7:34
3.	"Pearl's Girl"		9:39
4.	"Jumbo"		9:12
5.	"Push Upstairs (The Full Length of It)"		6:10
6.	"Moaner"		10:23
7.	"Shudder/King of Snake"	Bellotte, Moroder, Summer	9:30
8.	"8 Ball"		8:55
9.	"Two Months Off"		9:08

=== UK vinyl version ===
Disc one
No.	Title	Length
1.	"Bigmouth"	10:07
2.	"Dirty"	10:18
3.	"Mmm... Skyscraper I Love You"	13:15
4.	"Rez"	9:57

Disc two
No.	Title	Length
1.	"Spikee"	12:30
2.	"Dirty Epic"	9:59
3.	"Dark & Long (Dark Train)"	10:51
4.	"Cowgirl"	8:29

Disc three
No.	Title	Length
1.	"Born Slippy .NUXX"	7:34
2.	"Pearl's Girl"	9:39
3.	"Jumbo"	6:58
4.	"Push Upstairs (The Full Length of It)"	6:10

Disc four
No.	Title	Writer(s)	Length
1.	"Moaner"		10:23
2.	"Shudder/King of Snake"	Bellotte, Moroder, Summer	9:30
3.	"8 Ball"		8:55
4.	"Two Months Off"		9:08

== Charts ==
Chart performance for Underworld 1992–2002
Chart (2003–2005)	Peak position
Belgian Albums (Ultratop Flanders)	25
Dutch Albums (Album Top 100)	61
Japanese Albums (Oricon)	4
Scottish Albums (OCC)	38
UK Albums (OCC)	43
UK Dance Albums (OCC)	4
UK Independent Albums (OCC)	3
US Top Dance Albums (Billboard)	13

== Certifications ==
Certifications for Underworld 1992–2002
Region	Certification	Certified units/sales
Japan (RIAJ)	Gold	100,000^{^}
^{^} Shipments figures based on certification alone.
