= Dirty Epic =

1994 single by Underworld

- Cover of the American CD release

Single by Underworld

from the album dubnobasswithmyheadman
- A-side: "Cowgirl" (US; double A-side)
- B-side: "Dirty Guitar", "Dirty" (Europe): "Rez", "River of Bass" (US)
- Released: October 1994 (Europe); December 1994 (US)
- Genre: Techno; progressive house
- Length: 9:52
- Label: Intercord (Europe); Wax Trax! Records (US)
- Songwriters: Rick Smith, Karl Hyde

Underworld singles chronology
"Cowgirl" (1994)	"Dirty Epic" (1994)	"Born Slippy" (1995)

"Dirty Epic" is a 1994 single by British electronic band Underworld. It is a remix of the track "Dirty" released by Underworld in 1992, under the name Lemon Interupt. It appeared on the album dubnobasswithmyheadman, and it was later released as a single in Europe in October 1994 and released in the US as a double A-side with "Cowgirl".

The song failed to chart, but was critically acclaimed for its stream of consciousness lyrics and similarities to a pop song in structure and instruments, but major differences to pop despite that. It has been listed on multiple outlets lists of best Underworld songs.

== Background ==
Underworld began as a band in 1987, releasing funk and synth-pop music. This phase of the band is known as "Underworld Mk 1", and it disbanded in 1990. Karl Hyde, the vocalist for the band, travelled to Minneapolis to work as a session guitarist, before travelling to Los Angeles. Hyde later said that his time in Los Angeles was "such pain", and said that "I’d never known L.A. to be anything but cruel". Despite this, none of the melancholy lyrics of "Dirty Epic" were written in the city. Upon Hyde's return to Britain, he discovered that bandmate Rick Smith was working with DJ Darren Emerson to produce electronic music at Smith's studio in Romford. Hyde began to work with them to make music, and they began to release the tracks they produced under the Underworld name. Their first release, "Mother Earth" / "The Hump", was sold out of the back of Smith's car. They then began to release music under the name Lemon Interupt. Their first release under Lemon Interupt was a 12" single, containing the tracks "Eclipse" and "Bigmouth". Following this, they began work on a second release.

== "Dirty" ==
"Dirty"

Single by Lemon Interupt
- B-side: "Minniapolis": "Minniapolis Airwaves"
- Released: 1992
- Genre: Techno; Progressive house
- Length: 11:14: 10:18 (edit)
- Label: Junior Boy's Own
- Songwriters: Darren Emerson, Rick Smith, Karl Hyde

Lemon Interupt singles chronology
"Eclipse" / "Bigmouth" (1992)	"Dirty" / "Minniapolis" (1992)	"Dirty Guitar" (1992)

In 1992, the band released "Dirty", backed by "Minniapolis", under the name Lemon Interupt. It was the third release by the group following Darren Emerson's joining of the band. The single was released only on 12" vinyl, and never had a CD release.

The name of "Minniapolis" likely came from Hyde's recent visit to the city of Minneapolis. The name of the city is spelt incorrectly in the title of the song. The track "Minniapolis Airwaves" also appears as a B side following "Minniapolis", which mainly consists of sound effects, many of which are present in the coda of "Dirty", but the bass, hi-hats and other percussion from "Minniapolis" become present towards the end of the track.

"Dirty" would later appear on the single release of "Dirty Epic" and on the compilation album 1992–2002, while the previously unreleased full-length version of "Minniapolis" would appear on the compilation album 1992–2012 The Anthology, as part of the "Unreleased tracks and rarities" disc. The spelling is corrected on the tracklist of the compilation to be "Minneapolis". "Dirty" would also appear on the 20th anniversary deluxe edition and super deluxe edition of dubnobasswithmyheadman, as part of the "Singles 1991–1994" disc in the latter.

"Dirty" would also be included as the closing track of CD 3 on Renaissance: The Mix Collection, mixed by Sasha & John Digweed, which has been listed by multiple publications as one of the greatest DJ Mix albums of all time. The Lemon Interupt remix and Steppin' Razor (another Underworld pseudonym) remix of "Song of Life" by Leftfield would also appear on the album.

=== Sample issues ===
The coda of "Dirty" samples "Dolls' Polyphony" from the soundtrack of the anime film Akira, performed by the musical collective Geinoh Yamashirogumi. In all official Underworld releases after 1995, any appearances of "Dirty" fade out before the coda to avoid this sample. This was likely due to licensing issues with the sample of "Dolls' Polyphony". As such, the full length version of "Dirty" is unavailable officially on any streaming service.

"Minniapolis" features a sample of "When the Levee Breaks" by Led Zeppelin, from their album Led Zeppelin IV. This sample is still present on modern releases of the song.

=== Track listing ===
1992 12" release

1. "Dirty" - 11:14
2. "Minniapolis" - 9:07
3. "Minniapolis Airwaves" - 3:05

== "Dirty Guitar" ==
"Dirty Guitar"

Promotional single by Lemon Interupt
- Released: 1992
- Genre: Techno; Progressive house
- Length: 10:00
- Label: Collect Boy's Own
- Songwriters: Darren Emerson, Rick Smith, Karl Hyde

Underworld chronology
"Dirty" / "Minniapolis" (1992)	"Dirty Guitar" (1992)	"Mmm... Skyscraper I Love You" (1992)

Following the release of "Dirty", the band would release a remix of the track on white label vinyl, which was later named Dirty Guitar. The song utilises many elements of the original to create a new track, with a prominent guitar line throughout, hence the name. The track also features vocals, written by Hyde in Minneapolis and on his flight home, which would later be used on "Mmm... Skyscraper I Love You" and "Dirty Epic".

"Dirty Guitar" was originally intended to be released on dubnobasswithmyheadman as "Dirty Fuzz", but was later removed. As a result, the first official release of the track in its full length would be on the single for "Dirty Epic" in 1994, two years after its creation. However, it would appear on the Junior Boy's Own Collection compilation album, also released in 1994, in an edited form. Two other Underworld songs, "Rez" and "Bigmouth", would also appear on the compilation. The track is also featured in the 20th anniversary super deluxe edition of dubnobasswithmyheadman.

=== Track listing ===
1992 white label 12" release

1. "Dirty" (Remix) - 10:00

== "Dirty Epic" ==
=== Composition ===
Hyde's signature stream of consciousness lyrics, which are heard prominently on "Dirty Epic", were written by filling notebooks with his own thoughts and excerpts from other people's conversations. Hyde's first inspiration for the lyrics was Lou Reed's New York. He said in an interview with Melody Maker, "I eventually realised the only way to [write good lyrics] was by observing people in cafes and pubs and picking up on things they said. It's far more interesting than worrying about writing a perfect piece of poetry or some silly, catchy phrase." Despite this, Smith originally didn't want Hyde to perform vocals on the track.

The track features another vocal line in the background, which is taken from "Dirty Guitar".

=== Release ===
"Dirty Epic" was released on dubnobasswithmyheadman, where it appears in a version that segues into the following track, "Cowgirl". It was released as a single in Europe alongside the previous two versions of the track, "Dirty" and "Dirty Guitar". In the US, it was released as a double-A side with "Cowgirl", along with "River of Bass", also from dubnobasswithmyheadman, and "Rez", "Cowgirl"'s original A-side. The three versions of "Dirty Epic" are also present on the US release, however all are listed as "Dirty Epic", but with the name of the song credited as the mix, for example "Dirty" is listed as "Dirty Epic" (Dirty Mix). The European 12" release also does this. The version of "Dirty Epic" on the single, despite being called the "Album Version", differs from the version present on the album, as it does not contain the segue into "Cowgirl", and instead fades out. A version of "Cowgirl" is also credited as the "Album Version", but again differs from the version on the album.

=== Critical reception ===
In a review of dubnobasswithmyheadman, Ben Turner of Melody Maker calls the track "the album's greatest moment, with its vertiginous abyss of lush electronics and the most beguiling melody you'll ever hear from a computer." In an interview with Underworld in the following issue of Melody Maker, Christopher Dawes (under the pseudonym Push), correctly identified the Lou Reed inspiration when he said that "This [the lyrics'] harsh, slanted imagery wouldn't look out of place on, say, a Lou Reed album". The Guardian rated the song as the 8th best Underworld song, stating that "There is the ghost of a traditional pop song – with a chorus – in Dirty Epic, but it has been shattered and reassembled into nine bewitching minutes of strange, atmospheric, fragmented, propulsive music." Stereogum rated it as the 4th best Underworld song, calling it the best track on dubnobasswithmyheadman and said that even though it was the album's most "retrograde" track due to "its verse/chorus/verse structure, its use of guitar, its undistorted and understated vocals, and its complete-sentence lyrical directness", it was also the album's "most ambitious undertaking". They also praised the song's deep lyrics, calling it "a big-questions song".

=== Track listing ===
European 12" release

1. "Dirty Epic" (Dirty Guitar Mix)
2. "Dirty Epic" (Dirty Mix)

European CD release

1. "Dirty Epic" (Album Version)
2. "Dirty Guitar"
3. "Dirty"

American CD release (with "Cowgirl")

1. "Dirty Epic" (Dirty Guitar Mix)
2. "Dirty Epic" (Dirty Mix)
3. "Dirty Epic" (Album Version)
4. "Cowgirl" (Irish Pub in Kyoto Mix)
5. "Cowgirl" (Winjer Mix)
6. "Cowgirl" (Album Version)
7. "Rez"
8. "River of Bass"
