= Drift (Underworld project) =

Ongoing music project by Underworld

- Initial cover of the Drift playlist on streaming platforms

Recording by Underworld
- Released: 1 November 2018 - 12 September 2019
- Recorded: 2018-2019
- Genres: Electronic; ambient; experimental; jazztronica
- Length: Episode 1: 30:33; Episode 2: 85:14; Episode 3: 43:59; Episode 4: 38:10; Episode 5: 44:34; Manchester Street Poem: 64:50
- Label: Smith Hyde Productions
- Directors: Tomato; Simon Taylor
- Producer: Rick Smith

Underworld chronology
| Teatime Dub Encounters (2018) | Drift (2018–2019) | Drift Series 1 (2019) |

Singles from Drift
- 1. "Drift Episode 1 — Dust" Released: 6 December 2018; 2. "Drift Episode 2 — Atom" Released: 7 March 2019; 3. "Drift Episode 3 — Heart" Released: 2 May 2019; 4. "Drift Episode 4 — Space" Released: 4 July 2019; 5. "Drift Episode 5 — Game" Released: 19 September 2019

Drift was a 2018–2019 music-and-video experiment by the British electronic music group Underworld, with consecutive tracks and music videos released online on a weekly basis, between November 2018 and October 2019. Individual new tracks were made available through the band's official website as time-limited free downloads, along with accompanying videos published on YouTube — followed by digital EPs.

Between November 2018 and September 2019, 38 new tracks were released within five Episodes. In addition, a soundtrack album Manchester Street Poem, as well as 20 archival tracks and mixes were released in between regular Drift tracks. It was the band's second project distributed digitally, after the 2005–2006 series Riverrun.

On 1 November 2019, an album Drift Series 1, compiling all digital EPs and additional 11 new tracks, was released as a 7-CD, 1 Blu-ray box set, as well as digitally, along with a single-disc Drift Series 1 Sampler Edition. In September 2020, Drift Series 1 was re-released, including an additional eighth CD with a live performance.

== Background ==
Karl Hyde and Rick Smith's aim was to release new and previously unreleased music, film, and written stories throughout a full year, on a weekly basis, every Thursday, "and see where the journey took them." They admitted that the episodic idea for the project "grew out of boredom," jokingly adding later in the project it was "a foolhardy promise made in public." The duo wanted to disrupt the single-album-tour cycle, which for them repeats roughly every three years, by letting themselves to create instinctively and responsively, explaining "you want every day to be a challenge, particularly when it comes to making music." "Whether it's good or bad, we'll record with more honesty in this one year than we have in the previous fifteen... I mean, come on! We’ve got to try that."

Drift has its roots in earlier online Underworld projects, including the archive music released freely through underworldlive.com starting in 2000, the Riverrun project in 2005, and the band's live webcasts from 2004 to 2008. In April 2018, Underworld released by surprise their first new track since 2016's Barbara Barbara, We Face a Shining Future, "Brilliant Yes That Would Be", and in June 2018 an unfinished version of "Appleshine", each with a video directed by Underworld's art director Simon Taylor, of the band's own design-and-film collective Tomato. These releases foreshadowed the project and were later included in Drift releases. The first trailer for the project's Episode 1 was published on 25 October 2018.

The duo initiated Drift having been inspired by a conversation with the band's lighting designer Haydn Cruickshank, who has been a drift racer. The project's name also referenced the movie series The Fast And The Furious, particularly one of its sequels, Tokyo Drift. Drift's first video to "Another Silent Way" featured racing at the Rockingham Motor Speedway. The majority of Drift music videos was directed by Taylor, shot "from Shibuya Crossing to the Moroccan desert to rural Essex." At times, the videos were said to be delivered twenty four hours before they went live. Other contributions to the project included works of playwrights, DJs, painters, and poets.

Compositions of the first year of Drift feature collaborations with the Australian experimental jazz band The Necks, London producer Ø [Phase] aka Ashley Burchett, actor Matthew Trevannion, members of the rock band Black Country, New Road (including Georgia Ellery, Lewis Evans, and Karl Hyde's daughter Tyler Hyde), as well as Ichirou Agata of the Japanese noise rock band Melt-Banana.

Reflecting on the project, the band described the scale of Drift as "the most inspiring process that [they've] ever engaged in" yet relentless — "There's no expansion space... you can't get ill. You can't go on holiday. You don't have weekends" — and regretted how the rapid schedule made collaborating with other artists difficult, desiring to build more time into a second series.

=== Release format ===
New songs and video were released on YouTube each Thursday, for a total of five or six weeks in a row. The Thursday after the final song of each episode, the full episode would be released on streaming services and digital retail as an EP. Certain songs were released as digital singles ahead of their episodes.

Often, songs were altered between their video and final release - notably, the video release of "Mile Bush Pride" includes an outro that was later cut, the final version of "Molehill" was given an extended coda, and "Brilliant Yes That Would Be" was first cut into a 30 second intro to Episode 1, then extended to over 10 minutes on the box set release. The songs of Episode 1 were re-ordered and mixed to play continuously, later episodes did not follow this practice and Episode 1 was restored to its original order for the box set.

Between each Episode, Underworld published unreleased material, new remixes, live rehearsal recordings, DJ mixes, and other items from the band's archives (See: Archival tracks and mixes). These releases were often curated by Junior Boy's Own founder Steven Hall, and were compiled in a digital download for the Drift Series 1 box set.

=== The Guardian "socialist banger" ===
On 21 May 2019, Underworld released a new version of the track "Soniamode", originally featured on February's Episode 2 — Atom. Now dubbed "Soniamode (Aditya Game Version)," it featured lyrics written by The Guardian columnist and economics commentator Aditya Chakrabortty. The band's publicist knew Chakrabortty's 2018 column series The Alternatives, "about how to make the economy work for everyone," asked him to email a list of inspirational people, ideas, and processes, for the band, and the list ended up as a chorus for the track.

=== Potential sequel ===
Underworld originally announced on 21 May 2019 they would conclude Drift after its 52-week run with the compilation album Drift Songs, for release on single-CD, double vinyl, and a 6-CD, 1-Blu-ray box set. But with the release of the last song of Episode 5, on 12 September 2019, Underworld re-titled the upcoming album Drift Series 1 and announced the project would continue. In September 2020, when asked about the status of the project, Smith responded "Series 2? We’re already there, though, we’re just trying to figure out how to roll it out," and elaborated "Drift has always been happening, and Series 2 is merely a chosen starting point: a time and place."

After Drift Series 1, Underworld released a handful of new versions of classic tracks, including a remix of "Dark & Long" subtitled "Drift 2 Dark Train." Beyond this, there has been no mention of a second series. In 2023 and 2024, the band released several new songs, and in September 2024 announced Strawberry Hotel, a traditional studio album.

== Drift Series 1 ==
Drift Series 1

Studio album by Underworld
- Released: 1 November 2019
- Recorded: 2018–2019
- Genres: Electronic; ambient; experimental; jazztronica
- Length: 6:42:36; Sampler Edition: 57:23; Live in Amsterdam: 71:34
- Labels: Smith Hyde Productions; Caroline International
- Producer: Rick Smith

Underworld chronology
| Drift (2018–2019) | Drift Series 1 (2019) | Strawberry Hotel (2024) |

Singles from Drift
- 1. "Border Country (The Remixes)" Released: 15 November 2019

Professional ratings
Aggregate scores
| Source | Rating |
|---|---|
| AnyDecentMusic? | 8.2/10 |
| Metacritic | 86/100 |
Review scores
| Source | Rating |
| The Arts Desk | 4/5 stars |
| Clash | 9/10 |
| Mixmag | 9/10 |
| The Music | 4.5/5 stars |
| Mojo | 4/5 stars |
| PopMatters | 9/10 |
| Q | 4/5 stars |
| The Scotsman | 4/5 stars |
| Uncut | 8/10 |
| Under the Radar | 8/10 |

Drift Series 1 is the tenth studio album by the British electronic group Underworld, released on 1 November 2019. It is the conclusion of the first year of the band's year-long music-and-video experiment Drift, and the band's first full-length release since 2016's album Barbara Barbara, We Face a Shining Future.

Drift Series 1 was released exactly one year after the launch of the series, as a box set featuring 7 CDs, a Blu-ray, and an 80-page book documenting the creative process around Drift. A single-disc Drift Series 1 Sampler Edition was also released simultaneously, the Sampler Edition is a continuous mix of select songs from the series, many edited into shorter versions.

The full edition of Drift Series 1 features the expanded and reproduced tracks, videos and written text released throughout the series, and material the duo worked on but wasn't releasing before and during the Drift project. Each episode is presented across 7 separate CDs with some slight changes — Episode 1 was restored to its original release order, all three collaborations with The Necks were moved to their own CD, and additional unreleased songs were added to the end of every episode. The seventh CD includes the Sampler Edition of the album.

With the September 2020 re-release of Drift Series 1, an eighth CD was introduced with the live-set entitled RicksDubbedOutDriftExperience, recorded at Ziggo Dome in Amsterdam on 23 November 2019.

=== Critical reception ===
Drift Series 1 received critical acclaim from critics. At Metacritic, which assigns a normalised rating out of 100 to reviews from mainstream critics, the album received an average score of 86, based on 7 reviews, which indicates "universal acclaim". It is the band's most acclaimed studio album on the site to date. Mixmag applauded the album "absolutely stunning": "[While] certainly raw and reminiscent of a free-flowing jam session at times, what's particularly commendable is how beautifully produced each track is, with a discernible intention toward the arrangement of layers to establish powerful, thematic settings."

=== Accolades ===
| Publication | Accolade | Year | Rank | Ref. |
|---|---|---|---|---|
| Mojo | 75 Best Albums of 2019 | 2019 | 28 | |
| PopMatters | 70 Best Albums of 2019 | 2019 | 15 | |
| PopMatters | 25 Best Electronic Albums of 2019 | 2019 | 1 | |

=== Charts ===
| Chart (2019) | Peak position |
|---|---|
| Belgian Albums (Ultratop Flanders) | 89 |
| Dutch Albums (Album Top 100) | 60 |
| Japanese Albums (Oricon) | 69 |
| Japanese Dance & Soul Albums (Oricon) | 7 |
| Japanese Western Albums (Oricon) | 21 |
| Scottish Albums (Official Charts) | 30 |
| UK Albums (Official Charts) | 68 |
| UK Dance Albums (Official Charts) | 3 |
| UK Download Albums (OCC) | 85 |
| UK Physical Albums (OCC) | 24 |
| UK Record Store Albums (OCC) | 11 |
| UK Sales Albums (OCC) | 26 |
| UK Vinyl Albums (OCC) | 10 |
| US Top Dance Albums (Billboard) | 8 |

== Manchester Street Poem participation ==
In July 2017, Underworld recorded music for the live installation Manchester Street Poem at the Manchester International Festival. The project told stories of people in Manchester who find themselves homeless. On 13 June 2019, the complete score to the project was made available to download, with proceeds going toward the ongoing Manchester Street Poem project, dedicated to people who experienced homelessness. The album was promoted by the single "Doris," which was released on Drift Episode 4 on the same day as the full score.

== Track listing ==
The following is a chronological list of tracks released subsequently as digital Drift EPs. Track lengths adapted from music streaming platforms.

=== Episodes ===
==== Episode 1 — Dust ====
| No. | Title | Release date | Length |
|---|---|---|---|
| 1. | "Intro (BYTWB)" | 5 April 2018 | 0:30 |
| 2. | "Universe of Can When Back" | 22 November 2018 | 6:05 |
| 3. | "Dexters Chalk" (featuring Ø [Phase]) | 8 November 2018 | 5:01 |
| 4. | "Another Silent Way" | 1 November 2018 | 5:28 |
| 5. | "Low Between Zebras" (featuring Matthew Trevannion) | 15 November 2018 | 2:57 |
| 6. | "A Very Silent Way" (featuring The Necks) | 29 November 2018 | 10:32 |
| Total length: | | | 30:33 |

==== Episode 2 — Atom ====
| No. | Title | Release date | Length |
|---|---|---|---|
| 1. | "Appleshine" (Film Edit) | 24 January 2019 | 9:41 |
| 2. | "Molehill" | 31 January 2019 | 5:35 |
| 3. | "Threat of Rain" | 7 February 2019 | 14:51 |
| 4. | "Brussels" | 14 February 2019 | 4:19 |
| 5. | "Soniamode" | 21 February 2019 | 3:30 |
| 6. | "Appleshine Continuum" (featuring The Necks) | 28 February 2019 | 47:18 |
| Total length: | | | 85:14 |

==== Episode 3 — Heart ====
| No. | Title | Release date | Length |
|---|---|---|---|
| 1. | "Dune" | 28 March 2019 | 10:32 |
| 2. | "Custard Speed Talk" | 4 April 2019 | 9:43 |
| 3. | "This Must Be Drum Street" | 11 April 2019 | 5:55 |
| 4. | "Pinetum" | 18 April 2019 | 12:09 |
| 5. | "Poet Cat" | 25 April 2019 | 5:40 |
| Total length: | | | 43:59 |

==== Episode 4 — Space ====
| No. | Title | Release date | Length |
|---|---|---|---|
| 1. | "Listen to Their No" | 23 May 2019 | 5:48 |
| 2. | "Schiphol Test" | 30 May 2019 | 8:34 |
| 3. | "Hundred Weight Hammer" | 6 June 2019 | 4:15 |
| 4. | "Doris" | 13 June 2019 | 4:27 |
| 5. | "Altitude Dub" | 20 June 2019 | 8:10 |
| 6. | "Border Country" (featuring Ø [Phase]) | 27 June 2019 | 6:56 |
| Total length: | | | 38:10 |

==== Episode 5 — Game ====
| No. | Title | Release date | Length |
|---|---|---|---|
| 1. | "Toluca Stars" | 8 August 2019 | 10:18 |
| 2. | "Mile Bush Pride" | 15 August 2019 | 1:35 |
| 3. | "Imagine a Box" | 22 August 2019 | 6:02 |
| 4. | "Tree and Two Chairs" | 29 August 2019 | 13:32 |
| 5. | "Give Me The Room" (featuring Ø [Phase]) | 5 September 2019 | 9:25 |
| 6. | "S T A R" | 12 September 2019 | 3:36 |
| Total length: | | | 44:34 |

=== Drift Series 1 collective release ===
Details of the physical and digital release, which collects tracks from the Drift Episodes.

Drift Series 1 Sampler Edition
| No. | Title | Length |
|---|---|---|
| 1. | "Appleshine" | 8:36 |
| 2. | "This Must Be Drum Street" | 4:25 |
| 3. | "Listen to Their No" | 5:43 |
| 4. | "Border Country" | 6:51 |
| 5. | "Mile Bush Pride" | 1:34 |
| 6. | "Schiphol Test" | 4:42 |
| 7. | "Brilliant Yes That Would Be" | 6:03 |
| 8. | "S T A R (Rebel Tech)" | 3:45 |
| 9. | "Imagine a Box" | 6:02 |
| 10. | "Custard Speedtalk" | 9:42 |
| Total length: | | 57:23 |

EP 1: Dust
| No. | Title | Length |
|---|---|---|
| 1. | "Another Silent Way" | 5:33 |
| 2. | "Dexters Chalk" | 5:25 |
| 3. | "Low Between Zebras" | 3:00 |
| 4. | "Universe of Can When Back" | 5:36 |
| 5. | "Brilliant Yes That Would Be" | 10:20 |
| 6. | "Another Silent Way / Drift Poem / Better Than Diamonds" | 13:58 |
| 7. | "One True Piano Need Hand" | 9:42 |
| Total length: | | 53:34 |

EP 2: Atom
| No. | Title | Length |
|---|---|---|
| 1. | "Appleshine" | 9:44 |
| 2. | "Molehill" | 5:36 |
| 3. | "Threat of Rain" | 14:43 |
| 4. | "Brussels" | 4:32 |
| 5. | "Soniamode (Aditya Game)" | 6:18 |
| 6. | "Appleshine (All of the Lights)" | 5:35 |
| 7. | "Roof Off" | 7:11 |
| Total length: | | 53:39 |

EP 3: Heart
| No. | Title | Length |
|---|---|---|
| 1. | "Dune" | 10:33 |
| 2. | "Custard Speedtalk" | 9:42 |
| 3. | "This Must Be Drum Street" | 7:37 |
| 4. | "Pinetum" | 13:46 |
| 5. | "Poet Cat" | 5:41 |
| 6. | "Do Breakers Trip" | 3:34 |
| 7. | "Seven Music Drone" | 8:18 |
| Total length: | | 59:11 |

EP 4: Space
| No. | Title | Length |
|---|---|---|
| 1. | "Listen To Their No" | 5:50 |
| 2. | "Schiphol Test" | 8:35 |
| 3. | "Hundred Weight Hammer" | 4:15 |
| 4. | "Doris" | 4:25 |
| 5. | "Altitude Dub" | 8:09 |
| 6. | "Border Country" | 6:57 |
| 7. | "Big Bear" | 4:29 |
| Total length: | | 42:40 |

EP 5: Game
| No. | Title | Length |
|---|---|---|
| 1. | "Toluca Stars" | 10:18 |
| 2. | "Mile Bush Pride" | 1:36 |
| 3. | "Imagine a Box" | 6:02 |
| 4. | "Tree and Two Chairs" | 13:32 |
| 5. | "Give Me the Room" | 9:25 |
| 6. | "S T A R" | 3:38 |
| 7. | "Doscientos" | 7:44 |
| 8. | "Two Arrows" | 3:20 |
| 9. | "A Moth at the Door" | 4:45 |
| Total length: | | 60:12 |

CD 6: Underworld and The Necks
| No. | Title | Length |
|---|---|---|
| 1. | "Altitude Dub Continuum" | 31:10 |
| 2. | "A Very Silent Way" | 10:33 |
| 3. | "Appleshine Continuum" | 34:14 |
| Total length: | | 75:57 |

CD 7: Drift Series 1 Sampler
| No. | Title | Length |
|---|---|---|
| 1. | "Appleshine" | 8:36 |
| 2. | "This Must Be Drum Street" | 4:25 |
| 3. | "Listen to Their No" | 5:43 |
| 4. | "Border Country" | 6:51 |
| 5. | "Mile Bush Pride" | 1:34 |
| 6. | "Schiphol Test" | 4:42 |
| 7. | "Brilliant Yes That Would Be" | 6:03 |
| 8. | "S T A R (Rebel Tech)" | 3:45 |
| 9. | "Imagine a Box" | 6:02 |
| 10. | "Custard Speedtalk" | 9:42 |
| Total length: | | 57:23 |

Drift Series 1 – The Films
| No. | Title | Length |
|---|---|---|
| 1. | "Drift Trailer" |
| 2. | "Another Silent Way" |
| 3. | "Dexter’s Chalk" |
| 4. | "Low Between Zebras" |
| 5. | "Universe of Can When Back" |
| 6. | "A Very Silent Way" |
| 7. | "Appleshine" |
| 8. | "Molehill" |
| 9. | "Threat of Rain" |
| 10. | "Brussels" |
| 11. | "Soniamode (Aditya Game Version)" |
| 12. | "Appleshine Continuum" |
| 13. | "Dune" |
| 14. | "Custard Speedtalk" |
| 15. | "This Must Be Drum Street" |
| 16. | "Pinetum" |
| 17. | "Poet Cat" |
| 18. | "Listen to Their No" |
| 19. | "Schiphol Test" |
| 20. | "Hundred Weight Hammer" |
| 21. | "Doris" |
| 22. | "Altitude Dub" |
| 23. | "Border Country" |
| 24. | "Toluca Stars" |
| 25. | "Mile Bush Pride" |
| 26. | "Imagine a Box" |
| 27. | "Tree and Two Chairs" |
| 28. | "Give Me the Room" |
| 29. | "S T A R" |
| 30. | "Brilliant Yes That Would Be" |

=== Manchester Street Poem Installation Score ===
| No. | Title | Length |
|---|---|---|
| 1. | "Jenny" | 9:33 |
| 2. | "Doris" | 4:18 |
| 3. | "Charlie" | 6:23 |
| 4. | "James" | 5:51 |
| 5. | "Ed" | 5:36 |
| 6. | "Meredith" | 17:09 |
| 7. | "Harry" | 9:10 |
| 8. | "Mary" | 6:50 |
| Total length: | | 64:50 |

=== Series 1's archival tracks and mixes ===
The following is a chronological list of previously unreleased tracks, remixes, continuous mixes, and live rehearsal recordings, published on Thursdays, between Series 1 Episodes. The tracks were released on various platforms, and released as a collection in lossless WAV, available by a download code included in the Drift box set.

| No. | Title | Release date | Length |
|---|---|---|---|
| 1. | "The Misterons WOUW Mix 13-12-18" | 13 December 2018 | 36:06 |
| 2. | "Romford 1998 Live Rehearsal" | 20 December 2018 | 37:09 |
| 3. | "Coming out of Texas" (Desert Demos & Workings) | 27 December 2018 | 19:50 |
| 4. | "The Misterons Rowla/Cherry Jam" | 3 January 2019 | 8:42 |
| 5. | "The Misterons WOUW" ('La Bella Malinconia' Mix) | 10 January 2019 | 24:36 |
| 6. | "Small Conker and a Twix" | 17 January 2019 | 5:17 |
| 7. | "Twist" (Music Bank Jam Take 7) | 15 March 2019 | 10:46 |
| 8. | "Are You Rockstar" | 21 March 2019 | 4:55 |
| 9. | "Airtowel A2778" (Live Jam for Web December 2000) | 9 May 2019 | 10:20 |
| 10. | "Pearl's Girl Jam 080624" | 16 May 2019 | 25:59 |
| 11. | "Soniamode" (Aditya Game Version) | 21 May 2019 | 6:23 |
| 12. | "230605" (2005 Riverrun-era rehearsal jam) | 11 July 2019 | 18:01 |
| 13. | "ATL080328" (2008 live excerpt) | 18 July 2019 | 22:44 |
| 14. | "Leipzig Warehouse Jam 050715" | 25 July 2019 | 38:54 |
| 15. | "Chillin at the Shed (Misterons Mix)" | 1 August 2019 | 28:54 |
| 16. | "Biro the Leggy (Romford Dub)" | 26 September 2019 | 9:43 |
| 17. | "Dirty Club 2017 Version" | 3 October 2019 | 8:18 |
| 18. | "Best Mamgu Ever (Wales in Japan) 2019" | 10 October 2019 | 6:08 |
| 19. | "Why Why Why (Rehearsal 2018)" | 17 October 2019 | 7:22 |
| 20. | "Sydney Hotel Room Peal" | 24 October 2019 | 14:13 |

=== Border Country (The Remixes) EP ===
| No. | Title | Length |
|---|---|---|
| 1. | "Border Country (Adam Beyer & Bart Skils Remix)" | 8:12 |
| 2. | "Border Country (Adam Beyer & Bart Skils Remix / Radio Edit)" | 5:42 |
| 3. | "Border Country (Ø [Phase] Dark Room Tension Dub)" | 6:38 |
| Total length: | | 20:32 |

=== RicksDubbedOutDriftExperience (Live in Amsterdam) ===
| No. | Title | Length |
|---|---|---|
| 1. | "Mary" (Live in Amsterdam) | 7:06 |
| 2. | "Harry" (Live in Amsterdam) | 8:40 |
| 3. | "Jenny" (Live in Amsterdam) | 6:52 |
| 4. | "Give Me the Room" (Live in Amsterdam) | 9:03 |
| 5. | "Brussels" (Live in Amsterdam) | 4:55 |
| 6. | "Pinetum" (Live in Amsterdam) | 11:15 |
| 7. | "Seven Music Drone" (Live in Amsterdam) | 7:08 |
| 8. | "Threat of Rain" (Live in Amsterdam) | 13:18 |
| 9. | "Meredith" (Live in Amsterdam) | 3:17 |
| Total length: | | 71:34 |
