= Barbara Barbara, We Face a Shining Future =

Studio album by Underworld
- Released: 18 March 2016
- Genre: Electronic, progressive house, downtempo
- Length: 44:54
- Label: Caroline International
- Producer: Rick Smith, High Contrast, Steven Hall (exec.)

Underworld chronology
A Collection (2011)	Barbara Barbara, We Face a Shining Future (2016)	Teatime Dub Encounters (2018)

Singles from Barbara Barbara, we face a shining future
- 1. "I Exhale" Released: 19 January 2016; 2. "If Rah" Released: 12 February 2016; 3. "Nylon Strung" Released: 8 April 2016; 4. "Ova Nova" Released: 30 September 2016

Barbara Barbara, We Face a Shining Future (stylised as Barbara Barbara, we face a shining future) is the ninth studio album by British electronic group Underworld, released on 18 March 2016. It is the band's first studio album since Barking in 2010. Barbara Barbara received widespread critical acclaim upon its release and placed in several international charts. The album has also earned a 2017 Grammy Award nomination for Best Dance/Electronic Album.

== Background ==
In September 2010, Underworld released their eighth studio album Barking, a collaboration heavy record that consists of many guest contributors including High Contrast, Paul van Dyk and Dubfire, and features more emphasis on house music and drum and bass.

After the release of Barking, the band went on to release two compilation albums, 1992–2012 The Anthology and A Collection (the latter consists of radio edits and guest spots). They also worked on a few projects with frequent collaborator director Danny Boyle, who the band had previously worked with, providing tracks for several of his films including Trainspotting, A Life Less Ordinary and The Beach, as well as writing the score with John Murphy on Boyle's 2007 film Sunshine. These projects were the soundtrack for Boyle's theatre production play Frankenstein and as musical directors for the 2012 Summer Olympics opening ceremony in London. After these projects, Karl Hyde and Rick Smith spent a couple of years apart while they both worked on their own separate musical aspirations. Hyde released his debut solo album Edgeland in 2013 and released two collaborative albums with Brian Eno titled Someday World and High Life, both released in May and June 2014 respectively. Meanwhile, Smith would continue to work with Danny Boyle through providing the musical score for Boyle's 2013 film Trance and the score for Babylon, a British drama television series that aired on Channel 4 in 2014 for which Boyle co-created and directed the 90 minute pilot.

In late 2014, the band announced plans to release remastered and expanded editions of all of their studio albums "in the next few years". An expanded edition of dubnobasswithmyheadman was released on 6 October 2014, and the group toured in support of the album. An expanded edition of Second Toughest in the Infants was released on 20 November 2015. Underworld announced their brand new studio album only four days after the re-release of Second Toughest.

== Development ==
The span gap of six years between Underworld's last studio album Barking and Barbara Barbara is the longest wait between records in their music career. Karl Hyde has said of the album: "When I listen to this record what I’m proud of most is that Rick and I made a record without thinking about where it fits or if it sounds like Underworld." The album was co-produced by drum and bass producer High Contrast, who previously worked with the band on Barking.

== Title and artwork ==
Rick Smith came up with the title of the album from his father. Rick's mother's name is Barbara; she told Rick's father that she was fearful of the future without him, and Rick's father replied "Barbara, Barbara, we face a shining future". The artwork was created by art design collective group Tomato.

== Release ==
The album was released first in Japan on 16 March 2016 before being released worldwide two days later on 18 March.

== Critical reception ==
Professional ratings
Aggregate scores
Source	Rating
AnyDecentMusic?	7.6/10
Metacritic	81/100
Review scores
Source	Rating
AllMusic	4/5 stars
The A.V. Club	B+
The Guardian	4/5 stars
The Independent	3/5 stars
The Irish Times	4/5 stars
Mojo	4/5 stars
The Observer	4/5 stars
Pitchfork	8.1/10
Q	4/5 stars
Spin	8/10

Barbara Barbara, We Face a Shining Future received critical acclaim. At Metacritic, which assigns a normalised rating out of 100 to reviews from mainstream critics, the album received an average score of 81, based on 26 reviews, which indicates "universal acclaim". It was Underworld's most critically acclaimed album on the site since 1999's Beaucoup Fish. Critics praised the production values and Karl Hyde's vocal performance, calling it the band's best album in years, as well as viewing it as their creative rebirth in the band's late musical career period. David Jeffries from AllMusic awarded the album 4 stars out of 5, describing the album as "Near perfect and a step forward as well" and proclaimed that "Barbara Barbara, We Face a Shining Future belongs on Underworld's top shelf."

=== Accolades ===
Publication	Accolade	Year	Rank	Ref.
The Quietus	Albums of the Year 2016	2016	45	
Rough Trade	Albums of the Year	2016	67	

== Commercial performance ==
Barbara Barbara, We Face a Shining Future debuted at number 10 on the UK Albums Chart, with first-week sales of 7,017 copies. This makes it Underworld's third album to reach the top 10 in the chart and their first UK top ten album since Beaucoup Fish in 1999. Barbara Barbara... also charted on several other UK charts including the Dance Albums Chart (No. 2), Download Albums Chart (No. 6), UK Physical Albums Chart (No. 10), UK Record Store Albums Chart (No. 3), UK Sales Albums Chart (No. 7) and UK Vinyl Albums Chart (No. 4).

It also made the Billboard 200 chart, debuting and peaking at number 200. It's the band's seventh album to enter the chart.

== Track listing ==
All tracks are written by Rick Smith and Karl Hyde.

Standard edition
No.	Title	Length
1.	"I Exhale"	8:10
2.	"If Rah"	7:12
3.	"Low Burn"	6:44
4.	"Santiago Cuatro"	4:00
5.	"Motorhome"	6:23
6.	"Ova Nova"	5:31
7.	"Nylon Strung"	6:48
Total length:		44:54

Special edition (Test pressing) /Japanese bonus track
No.	Title	Length
8.	"Twenty Three Blue"	6:44
Total length:		51:38

== Charts ==
Chart (2016)	Peak position
Australian Albums (ARIA)	36
Austrian Albums (Ö3 Austria)	50
Belgian Albums (Ultratop Flanders)	7
Belgian Albums (Ultratop Wallonia)	23
Dutch Albums (Album Top 100)	12
French Albums (SNEP)	158
German Albums (Offizielle Top 100)	44
Irish Albums (IRMA)	34
Japanese Albums (Oricon)	14
Japanese Dance & Soul Albums (Oricon)	1
Japanese Western Albums (Oricon)	1
Scottish Albums (OCC)	8
Swiss Albums (Schweizer Hitparade)	51
UK Albums (OCC)	10
UK Dance Albums (OCC)	2
UK Download Albums (OCC)	6
UK Physical Albums (OCC)	10
UK Record Store Albums (OCC)	3
UK Sales Albums (OCC)	7
UK Vinyl Albums (OCC)	4
US Billboard 200	200
US Billboard Independent Albums	12
US Billboard Tastemaker Albums	14
US Billboard Top Dance/Electronic Albums	1
US Billboard Top Sales Albums	82

=== Year-end charts ===
Chart (2016)	Position
Belgian Albums (Ultratop Flanders)	101

== Release history ==
Country	Date	Format(s)	Label
Japan	16 March 2016	CD; LP	Beat
Europe	18 March 2016	CD; LP	Caroline International
United States	18 March 2016	CD; LP	Astralwerks
