= 1992–2012 The Anthology =

Greatest hits album by Underworld
- Released: 4 December 2011
- Recorded: 1992–2011
- Genres: Techno; house; trance; electronica
- Labels: underworldlive.com; Cooking Vinyl
- Producer: Rick Smith

Underworld chronology
Barking (2010)	1992–2012 The Anthology (2011)	A Collection (2012)

Professional ratings
Aggregate scores
Source	Rating
Metacritic	88/100
Review scores
Source	Rating
AllMusic	4.5/5 stars
The Irish Times	4/5 stars
Pitchfork	7.0/10
PopMatters	8/10
Q	5/5 stars
Uncut	4/5 stars
Under the Radar	6/10

1992–2012 The Anthology is a three-disc compilation album by Underworld, released 4 December 2011 on underworldlive.com for digital download. The physical CDs were released on 23 January 2012, along with A Collection, a single-disc compilation with radio edits. The first two discs contain a revamped version of 1992–2002, while the third disc of the collection contains an unreleased track from the band's early period, along with B-sides and other rarities.

1992–2012 is notable for including an extended version of "Jumbo", which was previously only available on a single Japanese promotional pressing of Underworld's previous greatest hits collection, 1992–2002. Unlike 1992–2002, this compilation's version of "Moaner" includes the fade out originally present on the soundtrack to Batman & Robin. Along with previous soundtrack contributions "Born Slippy .Nuxx", "Dark & Long (Dark Train)" (both from Trainspotting), "Cowgirl" (Hackers), "8 Ball" (The Beach) and "Moaner" (Batman & Robin), this collection also includes "To Heal", which was used in the 2007 film Sunshine and was included on that film's soundtrack with excerpted dialogue as "Capa Meets the Sun (To Heal)".

== Track listing ==
Disc one
No.	Title	Length
1.	"Bigmouth" (originally released under the artist name of Lemon Interrupt)	10:08
2.	"Mmm...Skyscraper I Love You"	13:16
3.	"Rez"	9:59
4.	"Cowgirl"	8:32
5.	"Spikee"	12:31
6.	"Dirty Epic"	10:00
7.	"Dark & Long" (Dark Train)	10:51

Disc two
No.	Title	Length
1.	"Born Slippy .Nuxx"	7:35
2.	"Pearl's Girl"	9:41
3.	"Jumbo"	9:12
4.	"8 Ball"	8:58
5.	"Moaner"	10:23
6.	"Two Months Off"	9:11
7.	"To Heal"	2:35
8.	"Crocodile"	6:31
9.	"Scribble"	7:03

Disc three (unreleased tracks and rarities)
No.	Title	Length
1.	"The Hump" (first ever Smith/Hyde/Emerson release; same as the "Groove Without a Doubt" mix from the "Mother Earth" single)	8:54
2.	"Big Meat Show" (unreleased track from dubnobasswithmyheadman)	9:08
3.	"Minneapolis" (B-side to "Dirty", full length version, originally released under the artist name of Lemon Interrupt)	10:05
4.	"Why, Why, Why" (B-side to "Rez")	12:16
5.	"Oich Oich" (B-side to "Pearl's Girl")	8:34
6.	"Second Hand" (from Café del Mar Volume 1, remix of 'Thing in a Book')	9:04
7.	"Parc" (live track from Japan-only The Bells the Bells, edited)	3:32
8.	"Simple Peal" (Barking Japan-only bonus track)	4:34
9.	"JAL to Tokyo" (from Lovely Broken Thing)	5:45
