= Dark & Long =

1994 single by Underworld

Single by Underworld

from the album dubnobasswithmyheadman
- B-side: "215 Miles", "Burt's", "Dark Hard", "Dark Train", "Spoon Deep", "Most 'Ospitable", "Thing in a Book"
- Released: 13 June 1994
- Label: Junior Boy's Own
- Songwriters: Rick Smith, Karl Hyde, Darren Emerson
- Producers: Rick Smith, Karl Hyde, Darren Emerson

Underworld singles chronology
"Spikee" (1993)	"Dark & Long" (1994)	"Cowgirl" (1994)

Alternative cover
- 1994 April Records CD

Professional ratings
Review scores
Source	Rating
AllMusic	4/5 stars
Starpulse	4.5/5 stars

"Dark & Long" is a song by British electronic music group Underworld and the opening track on their third studio album, dubnobasswithmyheadman (1994). The band released a number of versions of the track, including the "Dark Train" mix, which was later made popular through its inclusion in the 1996 film Trainspotting.

== Writing ==
Karl Hyde wrote the lyrics over a long period of time, with some dating to when he was staying in Minneapolis, Minnesota following the breakup of "Underworld Mk 1" in 1990. Portions were also written on a train to Underworld's studio in Romford, Greater London. Hyde stated that his apparent obsession with waitresses, addressed in the lyrics of "Dark & Long", "Confusion the Waitress" and "The Big Meat Show", among others, was because he felt they were "very very important" as they "put you right when you need a place to rest". He also said the section where he comments "what a laugh" was inspired by his fascination with the accent in East London, where the band were based, as he had been based elsewhere prior to the founding of Underworld.

== Release and legacy ==
The original UK release was on two 12" vinyl records and one CD single. A CD EP, featuring an additional track not released in the UK, was released on Scandinavian label April Records. The single entered the UK Singles Chart at number 57 on 25 June 1994 for one week. Excluding the album version and edit of it, seven band-made versions of the song were included on the original release. A remix of the "Thing in a Book" version, titled "Second Hand", would appear on the Café Del Mar (Ibiza) album, also released in 1994.

The "Dark Train" mix of "Dark & Long" became best known due to its use in the 1996 film Trainspotting, which also featured the Underworld song "Born Slippy Nuxx". "Dark Train" appears in a scene where the main character Mark Renton (Ewan McGregor) is going through heroin withdrawal. This created renewed interest in the song – alongside a much greater interest in "Born Slippy Nuxx" – which led to "Dark Train" being included in the film's second soundtrack album, as well as many other compilations such as Northern Exposure.

"Dark Train" and the Darren Price and High Contrast Remix of "Dark & Long" both appeared during the athletes' march at the opening ceremony of the London 2012 Olympics and on its soundtrack album Isles of Wonder.

In 2021, Underworld released a new version of "Dark Train", titled "Drift 2 Dark Train", as part of their Drift series.

In 2025, British artist PinkPantheress sampled the "Dark Train" version in the song "Illegal", the third single from her mixtape Fancy That.

In 2026, Darren Emerson released a solo remake of "Dark & Long (Dark Train)". He was a member of Underworld and co-wrote the original, but left the band in 2000. His remake was included on Sasha & John Digweed's Northern Exposure Redux.

== Track listings ==
All tracks were written, mixed and produced by Rick Smith, Karl Hyde, and Darren Emerson unless otherwise noted.

- 12-inch vinyl 1
1. "Dark & Long" (Dark Train) – 10:21
2. "Dark & Long" (Burts) – 8:47
- 12-inch vinyl 2
1. "Dark & Long" (Spoon Deep) – 17:58
2. "Dark & Long" (Thing in a Book) – 20:12
- CD single
1. "Dark & Long" (Hall's edit) – 4:08 (Hyde/Smith)
2. "Dark & Long" (Dark Train) – 9:51
3. "Dark & Long" (Most 'Ospitable) – 5:52
4. "Dark & Long" (215 Miles) – 20:02
- April Records EP
1. "Dark & Long" (7-inch) – 4:07 (Hyde/Smith)
2. "Dark & Long" (Thing in a Book) – 20:12
3. "Dark & Long" (Spoon Deep) – 17:58
4. "Dark & Long" (Dark Hard) – 11:30
5. "Dark & Long" (Dark Train) – 10:28
6. "Dark & Long" (Burts) – 8:47
- 12-inch vinyl 3 (2021)
1. "Dark & Long" (Drift 2 Dark Train) – 10:11
2. "Dark & Long" (Most 'Ospitable 2014 Remaster) – 5:57
3. "Dark & Long" (Dark Train 2014 Remaster) – 9:53

The length of "Dark Train" varies from release to release, however the full length version, as featured on the compilation 1992–2002, is 10:51.

== Charts ==
Chart (1994)	Peak positions
UK Singles (Official Charts)	57
UK Dance (Official Charts)	19
UK Dance (Music Week)	4
UK Club Chart (Music Week)	85
