= Riverrun (Underworld project) =

- Cover of Lovely Broken Thing, the first digital EP of the Riverrun series

Recording by Underworld
- Released: 9 November 2005 through to 5 June 2006
- Recorded: 2004–2006
- Genre: Electronic, Experimental
- Length: "Riverrun 03": 28:36 "Riverrun 04": 25:07 "Riverrun 05": 30:34
- Label: Smith Hyde Productions
- Producer: Rick Smith

Underworld chronology
1992–2002 (2003)	Riverrun (2005–2006)	Live in Tokyo 25th November 2005 (2005)

Riverrun is the musical project by the British electronic music group Underworld, released between 9 November 2005 and 5 June 2006, exclusively on the band's official website, as a series of three internet-only EPs, and as limited 12" vinyl releases.

== Background ==
While touring the album A Hundred Days Off in 2003 through Australia and the Middle East, and nearing the end of their record contract, Hyde and Smith desired to take a new approach to recording and releasing music. Excited by the idea of the long tail effect described in a Wired article and the writings of Robert Fripp, the band elected to go fully independent and release music entirely through online distribution, free downloads, and live broadcasts, an idea the band had talked about doing for over 20 years. The band had started a habit of publishing content online in 2000 - including archive music, photos, and diary entries - as an online extension to the Everything Everything DVD. The band received responses to their first post "within hours" which Hyde later described as "an incredibly empowering moment, when we realized that there [are] more than the traditional ways of communicating."

The band described the project as "an occasional series 'straight from the mixing desk' and [the three releases] are comprised from the 'work-in-progress' at that moment in time." "The riverrun is our name not only for the flow of the jam but also for that part of the process where 'one thing flows into another.'" Each digital EP was a download-only package in a .zip file containing a single 192 kbit/s encoded .mp3 file with all tracks mixed together, as well as a QuickTime slide-show of black-and-white photographs set to ambient sounds, and a PDF file of the CD insert.

More than 200 tracks of newly recorded material proved hard to curate, so Hyde and Smith asked for the opinions of DJ and production friends including Pete Heller, James Holden, Darren Price, the Junior Boy's Own head Steven Hall, and Sven Väth before assembling each release. Some of the tracks were recorded and adapted for soundtracks, 2006's Breaking and Entering and 2008's Sunshine, as well as the band's next full-length 2007 album Oblivion with Bells; each of these records were treated as extensions of the Riverrun project itself. John Warwicker (a former member of Underworld's precursor band Freur) and the band's own graphic-arts company Tomato helped manage the series.

Concurrent with the downloads, the band began a series of web radio shows broadcast through Apple Quicktime between 2004 and 2008, which they also described as "part of the 'Riverrun' series". During these webcasts, Underworld answered questions from a live chat, and broadcast live performances and unreleased music alongside other selections from their favorite artists.

Speaking in 2007, Hyde described their "multi-stranded" method of releasing music online as "more natural than always having to work the traditional way, which can be very cumbersome, and very constraining when you always have to put music out as a physical and scheduled product," and compared it to selling newly pressed 12" singles out of the trunk of their car, which the band did in the early 90s. However, in 2019, Hyde admitted that "most of it felt unfinished. It came out before it’d reached a place that certainly [Rick Smith] was happy with. [The songs on Riverrun] were rough sketches of ideas that were assembled in a way that was attractive, but they were still rough. They still had a journey to go on."

== The digital EPs ==
The first in the series is Lovely Broken Thing, codenamed "Riverrun 03," released online on 9 November 2005. The download-only package was "made up of seven new tracks that fuse into a single, undulating work." It also included a gallery of selected 177 black-and-white photographs by Karl Hyde, and a PDF file with a front cover artwork for a CD insert.

The second EP, Pizza for Eggs, codenamed "Riverrun 04," was released online on 7 December 2005, with six new tracks as a single 25-minute 8-second piece. The package includes a gallery of selected 444 photographs by Karl Hyde.

The third EP entitled I'm a Big Sister, and I'm a Girl, and I'm a Princess, and This Is My Horse, codenamed "Riverrun 05," was released on 5 June 2006. It "explores a darker, moodier side to Underworld", with the audio section being made from 5 new tracks jammed together to form a single work. The 53-images gallery is a slide show with audio with images gathered by Karl in Tokyo in November 2005, and curated by John."

For those who bought all three Riverrun EPs, an additional free EP, The Misterons Mix was released online on 10 July 2006, which includes tracks from all three releases.

== Singles ==
A series of four limited edition 12-inch records, which included remixes of "JAL to Tokyo", "Play Pig", "Peggy Sussed", and "Vanilla Monkey" by Pete Heller, Buick Project, Pig & Dan, Wighnomy, Paul Woolford, and Martinez were released in 2006 at the end of the project. Digital singles were also released through iTunes and underworldlive.com.

A "JAL to Tokyo" single was also released exclusively to iTunes Store Japan, with an extended version of "Ancient Phat Farm Coat" and an unmixed version of "Food a Ready" as b-sides.

== Later works ==
Two singles, "020202" and "Phonestrap", were released exclusively on Underworldlive in 2008. Each presented work-in-progress songs in a similar vein as the series.

Underworld would return to the idea of internet-only releases in 2018, with the experimental year-long music-and-video project Drift. After the completion of Drift Series 1, Karl explained "The Drift series has taken inspiration from [Riverrun] in that [the songs] been carried to a much higher level of completion." The song "S T A R" from Drift re-uses loops from "Lenny Penne".

== Track listing ==
Originally delivered as single audio files titled "Audio.mp3." The track times listed are estimated.

=== Lovely Broken Thing ===
No.	Title	Length
1.	"JAL to Tokyo"
2.	"Billy Goat"
3.	"Peggy Sussed"
4.	"Dub Shepherd"
5.	"Lenny Penne"
6.	"Monkey Wink"
7.	"Witness"
Total length:		28:36

=== Pizza for Eggs ===
No.	Title	Length
1.	"Food a Ready"
2.	"Back in the Fears"
3.	"Vanilla Monkey"
4.	"Flatz"
5.	"Ancient Phat Farm Coat"
6.	"Play Pig"
Total length:		25:07

=== I'm a Big Sister, and I'm a Girl, and I'm a Princess, and This Is My Horse ===
No.	Title	Length
1.	"Peach Tree"
2.	"Mowed Path"
3.	"Showlder"
4.	"Wedge"
5.	"11 Hundred Hz"
Total length:		30:34
