= Spikee =

"Spikee" / "Dogman Go Woof"

Single by Underworld
- B-side: "Dogman Go Woof"
- Released: 6 December 1993
- Length: 12:34
- Label: Junior Boy's Own
- Songwriter(s): Rick Smith, Karl Hyde, Darren Emerson
- Producer(s): Rick Smith, Karl Hyde, Darren Emerson

Underworld singles chronology
"Rez" (1993)	"Spikee" / "Dogman Go Woof" (1993)	"Dark & Long" (1994)

"Spikee" is a non-album single by British electronic music group Underworld, originally released on 6 December 1993 in the UK. It entered the UK Singles Chart at number 63 on 18 December 1993 for one week.

== Track listings ==
12-inch: JBO / JBO 17 (UK)

1. "Spikee" – 12:34 (Hyde/Smith/Emerson)
2. "Dogman Go Woof" – 12:13 (Smith/Emerson)

CD: JBO / JBO 17 CD (UK)

1. "Spikee" – 12:34
2. "Dogman Go Woof" – 12:13

== Notes ==
- Dogman Go Woof written, produced and mixed by Rick Smith and Darren Emerson
- Published by Underworld / Sherlock Holmes Music
- Sleeve design by Third Planet Inc.
- The text 'PICK YOUR OWN' is etched into the run-out groove of the 12".
- The text 'DOGMANGOWOOF' is etched into the run-out groove of the 500-only pressing Underworld 12" single, "Mother Earth / The Hump".

== Appearances ==
- Spikee was released on CD as part of the 1992–2002 Anthology set released worldwide in 2003.
- Spikee appears on Cyberspace 2 (a CD compilation) (1994) in an edited form.
- Spikee appears on Foundations - Coming Up From the Streets (2CD Compilation) (1997)
- Spikee appears on Wax Trax! MasterMix, a 1999 Compilation CD.
- Spikee appears on Dream Injection, Volume 1, a 1995 Compilation CD.
- The Spikee video, directed by Graham Wood (1993), appears on the UK released video compilation Kiteless: A Tomato Project.
- The same video version of Spikee also appears on the US released compilation, Footwear Repairs by Craftsmen at Competitive Prices.
- "Spikee" also appeared on BBC's Saturday Afternoon Grandstand as background music.
- The guitar section from "Spikee" also appeared as the title music for ITV's Saturday lunchtime football magazine On the Ball in the late 1990s and the early 2000s.
