= Underneath the Radar =

Studio album by Underworld
- Released: 16 February 1988
- Recorded: 1987
- Genre: Funk, rock, synthpop
- Length: 48:06
- Label: Sire
- Producer: Rupert Hine

Underworld chronology
Underneath the Radar (1988)	Change the Weather (1989)

Singles from Underneath the Radar
- 1. "Underneath the Radar" Released: April 1988

Professional ratings
Review scores
Source	Rating
AllMusic	2.5/5 stars
The Encyclopedia of Popular Music	2/5 stars

Underneath the Radar is the debut album by Underworld, released in 1988. The album was a success in Australia, South Africa and the US (where it reached number 139 on the Billboard 200). The title track of the album was released as a single which reached top five on the ARIA singles charts and number seventy-four on the U.S. Billboard Hot 100.

The album was recorded live in the studio during a single session, and was promoted as such to underscore the technical expertise of the band members. Promotional appearances for the album's release featured the band playing the entire album live and in sequence.

== Critical reception ==
Trouser Press wrote that "Rupert Hine’s production of Underneath the Radar gives it a sturdy dance backbone and the familiar sound of late-'80s British techno- beat; Heaven 17 leaning towards the Thompson Twins." MusicHound Rock: The Essential Album Guide deemed the album "much more of a modern rock effort."

== Track listing ==
All songs by Karl Hyde, Rick Smith, and Alfie Thomas.

No.	Title	Length
1.	"Glory! Glory!"	5:42
2.	"Call Me No.1"	5:05
3.	"Rubber Ball (Space Kitchen)"	3:38
4.	"Show Some Emotion"	4:24
5.	"Underneath the Radar"	6:05
6.	"Miracle Party"	1:26
7.	"I Need a Doctor"	4:51
8.	"Bright White Flame"	5:09
9.	"Pray"	5:43
10.	"The God Song"	6:01

== Personnel ==
- Karl Hyde — lead vocals, guitars
- Alfie Thomas — guitars, backing vocals
- Rick Smith — keyboards, backing vocals
- Baz Allen — bass
- Bryn B. Burrows — drums

== Production ==
- Produced by: Rupert Hine
- Recorded and Mixed by: Stephen W Tayler
- Assisted by: Andrew Scarth

== Charts ==
Chart (1988)	Peak position
Australian Albums (ARIA)	32
U.S. Billboard 200	139

== Certifications ==
Region	Certification	Certified units/sales
Australia (ARIA)	Gold	35,000^{^}
^{^} Shipments figures based on certification alone.
