= Rez (song) =

Single by Underworld
- B-side: "Why, Why, Why": "Cow Girl"
- Released: 1993
- Genre: Progressive trance
- Label: Junior Boy's Own
- Songwriters: Rick Smith, Karl Hyde
- Producers: Rick Smith, Karl Hyde, Darren Emerson

Underworld singles chronology
"Mmm... Skyscraper I Love You" (1993)	"Rez" (1993)	"Spikee / Dogman Go Woof" (1993)

"Rez" is a non-album track by British electronic music group Underworld, originally released in 1993 in the UK. It became a popular club hit and live track in Underworld's sets, despite the fact it could not be found on an album. However, it did appear on many compilations, b-sides, and even appeared on a bonus disc for Second Toughest in the Infants (1996). The first promo release of the single was pressed onto pink vinyl, and is highly collectible as it has an exclusive non-album track, "Why, Why, Why". The song's obscurity led to many bootleg pressings of the song before it was officially re-issued as part of 1992–2012 The Anthology. The more common release has the single "Cowgirl" as its b-side. This version also received a limited white vinyl pressing in the US.

== Track listing ==
- 12" / Junior Boy's Own / COLLECT 002 (UK) Promo Pink Vinyl
1. "Rez" – 9:55
2. "Why, Why, Why" – 12:14
- 12" / Junior Boy's Own / COLLECT 002 (UK)
1. "Rez" - 9:55
2. "Cowgirl" - 8:30
- 12" / Junior Boy's Own / JBO 13 (UK)
1. "Rez" - 9:55
2. "Cowgirl" - 8:30
- 12" / Junior Boy's Own / JBO 1001 (UK) 1995
1. "Rez" - 9:55
2. "Cowgirl" - 8:30
- 12" / Logic / Junior Boy's Own / LOC 188 (GERMAN) 1996 Promo
1. "Born Slippy" - 11:37
2. "Rez" - 9:55

- 12" / Wax Trax! / TVT Records / TVT 8718-0 (US)
1. "Rez" - 9:55
2. "Cowgirl" - 8:30
- 12" / Simply Vinyl (S12) / S12DJ118 (UK) Reissue
1. "Rez" - 9:55
2. "Cowgirl" - 8:30
- 12" / Dance Train Classics / 541 / 541416 500462 (BELGIUM) Reissue
1. U2 - "Lemon" (Perfecto Mix) - 8:54
2. Underworld - "Rez" - 9:55
- 12" / I Love Techno Classics / 541 / 541416 501471 (BELGIUM) Reissue
1. Dave Angel - "Airborne" (Carl Craig Remix) - 11:39
2. Underworld - "Rez" - 9:55

== Notes ==
- The text "CLOUD HAT REMEMBER THIS" is etched into the run-out groove of the COLLECT 002 12".
- Unofficial bootleg remixes of 'Rez' / 'Cowgirl' by breakz DJ's 'Atomic Hooligan' were deemed good enough by Underworld's record label and led to their inclusion as remixers of "Born Slippy .NUXX 2003" in 2003
- The White Island EP (CD & 2x12") by Salt Tank features a track inspired by Underworld's "Rez". "Rezmorize", as the name suggests, is an homage to Underworld's famous instrumental track.
- Underworld's labelmates, Futureshock, were also inspired by "Rez"'s b-side, "Why, Why, Why", which is sampled heavily in "The Question", and was released on the JBO label offshoot, Fuju.
- After hearing the song at a performance, Tetsuya Mizuguchi decided to rename his at-the-time work in progress game from K-Project to Rez. The name stayed into its release.

== Appearances ==
- "Rez" appears on numerous dance compilations.
- "Rez" appears on the 1994 Underworld EP Dirty Epic/Cowgirl.
- "Rez" appears in the film Vanilla Sky.
- "Rez" was played in a nightclub scene in Alias's third-season episode "The Nemesis".
- A remix of "Rez" was played during the Athletes' Parade of the 2012 Summer Olympics opening ceremony in London.
- "Rez" and "Why Why Why" appears on the bonus 8 cm disc on the re-released Japanese Dubnobasswithmyheadman (2001).
- "Rez" and "Why Why Why" both appear on Underworld's compilation 1992–2012 The Anthology (2012).
- "Why, Why, Why" appears on the compilation/magazine Volume 8 as a 5:15 edit.
- "Why, Why, Why" appears on the compilation/magazine Wasted – The Best of Volume, part 1 as an 8:20 remix, incorrectly labelled "Change" on the cover.
- "Rez" appeared on the closing sequence of Japanese television channel TV Asahi from 2003 to 2008.

== Charts ==
Chart (1993)	Peak position
UK Singles (OCC)	196
UK Dance (Music Week)	2
