= Mmm Skyscraper I Love You =

"Mmm...Skyscraper I Love You"

Single by Underworld

from the album Dubnobasswithmyheadman
- B-side: "Telegraph 6.11.92": "Jam Scraper"
- Released: 11 June 1993
- Genre: Progressive house
- Length: 13:09
- Label: Junior Boy's Own
- Songwriter(s): Rick Smith, Karl Hyde, Darren Emerson
- Producer(s): Rick Smith, Karl Hyde, Darren Emerson

Underworld singles chronology
"Dirty Guitar" (1992)	"Mmm...Skyscraper I Love You" (1993)	"Rez" (1993)

"Mmm...Skyscraper I Love You" is a 1993 single by Underworld. It did not make the charts.

The song's title comes from an art compilation by Underworld's design company, Tomato. The title included an ellipsis between the first two words when it appeared on the 1993 single, but it is then written without an ellipsis on the Dubnobasswithmyheadman album and on the band's compilation albums.

In an interview with Melody Maker Karl Hyde explained how he created the song's stream of consciousness lyrics:

"I write lots of stuff when I'm travelling. I write all my ideas in notebooks... I remember flying over New York and looking down and thinking, 'It's a beautiful thing'. So that's exactly what I scribbled down. And when the captain said, 'We're 30,000 feet above the earth', I wrote that down as well. Those words then became the opening two lines of 'Skyscraper'. Most of the rest of 'Skyscraper' came from stuff which I'd collected wandering round the New York streets over the course of a week. I got some of it out of The Village Voice and Screw magazine, and other parts I wrote in an alleyway in Greenwich Village at four in the morning. When I got back, I cut the various lines up and then made a montage. It's kind of a Cubist way of writing. What I'm trying to do is paint around subjects instead of focusing straight in on them."

== Track listing ==
=== Vinyl: boix 13, 857 051-1; Vinyl promo: BOIXDJ 13 (UK) ===
1. "Mmm...Skyscraper I Love You" – 13:09
2. "Mmm...Skyscraper I Love You" (Telegraph 6.11.92) – 7:06
3. "Mmm...Skyscraper I Love You" (Jam Scraper) – 9:12

=== CD: JBO / BOICD 13, 857 051-2 (UK) ===
1. "Mmm...Skyscraper I Love You" – 13:07
2. "Mmm...Skyscraper I Love You" (Telegraph 6.11.92) – 6:51
3. "Mmm...Skyscraper I Love You" (Jam Scraper) – 8:47

== Notes ==
- Sleeve design by Tomato.
- The text 'THE EGG OF WINDS' is etched into the A-side of the 12", and 'I Am A TOMATO' is etched into the B-side.
