= The Bells the Bells =

The Bells The Bells

Remix album by Underworld
- Released: 25 June 2008
- Genre: Electronic
- Label: Traffic
- Producer: Rick Smith

Underworld chronology
Beautiful Burnout (2008)	The Bells The Bells (2008)	Ring Road (2008)

The Bells The Bells is a remix CD/DVD album released by the electronic band Underworld in Japan on 25 June 2008. It includes remixes of songs from the album Oblivion with Bells, as well as a complementary DVD, which includes all the music videos for Oblivion with Bells. The album reached number 1 on the Tower Records Japan Club/Techno Chart.

The album also includes the previously unreleased song, "Parc", which was released by Underworld as the official J-Wave 20th Anniversary Song. The song is a reworking of a previous live performance of the then-named "Darc" in Amsterdam in 2005. A slightly edited version of "Parc" was later included on The Anthology 1992–2012.

== Track listing ==
CD

1. "Parc (previously unreleased)"
2. "Crocodile (Innervisions Orchestra mix)"
3. "Boy, Boy, Boy (Switch remix)"
4. "Beautiful Burnout (Pig & Dan remix)"
5. "Beautiful Burnout (Mark Knight remix)"
6. "Ring Road (Autokratz remix)"
7. "Ring Road (Kris Menace remix)"
8. "Holding the Moth (Audiojack remix)"

DVD

1. "Crocodile" (Directed by Simon Taylor)
2. "Crocodile" – version (Directed by Simon Taylor) – a.k.a. 'Alligator version'
3. "Boy, Boy, Boy" (Directed by Simon Taylor)
4. "Beautiful Burnout" (Directed by Dirk Van Dooren)
5. "Ring Road" (Directed by Ian St.George Freeman and Graham Wood)
6. "Ring Road" – version (Directed by John Warwicker and Julian Bryant)
7. "Beautiful Burnout" (Live at the Oblivion Ball, Japan 2007. Directed by Simon Taylor)
