= Change the Weather =

Studio album by Underworld
- Released: 4 September 1989 (Australia)
- Genre: New wave, synthpop, alternative dance
- Length: 38:01
- Label: Sire Records
- Producer: Rick Smith

Underworld chronology
Underneath the Radar (1988)	Change the Weather (1989)	Dubnobasswithmyheadman (1994)

Professional ratings
Review scores
Source	Rating
AllMusic	2/5 stars

Change the Weather is the second album released by Underworld, in 1989. It contains the single "Stand Up", which became the band's biggest US hit, peaking at number 69 on the Billboard Hot 100 and number 14 on the Alternative Songs chart in 1989. The album peaked at number 64 on the Australian albums chart in October 1989.

== Track listing ==
All songs by Karl Hyde, Rick Smith and Alfie Thomas, unless noted.

No.	Title	Writer(s)	Length
1.	"Change the Weather"		3:30
2.	"Stand Up"		3:52
3.	"Fever"		3:29
4.	"Original Song"		3:56
5.	"Mercy"		3:32
6.	"Mr. Universe"		3:28
7.	"Texas"		3:48
8.	"Thrash"		4:17
9.	"Sole Survivor"		4:04
10.	"Beach"	Hyde, Smith	2:07

== Charts ==
Chart (1989)	Peak position
Australian Albums (ARIA)	64
