= Beautiful Burnout =

Beautiful Burnout may refer to:

- Beautiful Burnout (TV series), a British television programme
- a track on Oblivion with Bells
- Beautiful Burnout, a play by Bryony Lavery produced by Frantic Assembly and the National Theatre of Scotland.
