= Barking (album) =

Studio album by Underworld
- Released: 2 September 2010
- Genres: Progressive house, alternative dance, progressive trance, techno, drum and bass
- Length: 53:39
- Labels: Cooking Vinyl (EU); Om Records (US)
- Producers: Rick Smith, Dubfire, Mark Knight, D. Ramirez, High Contrast, Appleblim, Al Tourettes, Darren Price, Paul van Dyk

Underworld chronology
Oblivion with Bells (2007)	Barking (2010)	1992–2012 The Anthology (2012)

Singles from Barking
- 1. "Scribble" Released: 28 June 2010; 2. "Always Loved a Film" Released: 20 September 2010; 3. "Bird 1" Released: 22 November 2010

Professional ratings
Aggregate scores
Source	Rating
Metacritic	67/100
Review scores
Source	Rating
AllMusic	3/5 stars
The A.V. Club	C
Drowned in Sound	6/10
musicOMH	3/5 stars
NME	5/10
Pitchfork	5.9/10
PopMatters	7/10
Record Collector	4/5 stars
Resident Advisor	4/5 stars
Uncut	4/5 stars

Barking is the eighth studio album by British electronic group Underworld, released on 2 September 2010. The album debuted at number twenty-six on the UK Albums Chart, selling 5,146 copies in its first week.

== Composition and release ==
The album is named after Barking, historically in Essex and now in Greater London. Each track on the album was written by band members Karl Hyde and Rick Smith in Essex, before being sent to well-known trance, drum and bass and dubstep producers. The album sees further collaboration with Mark Knight and D. Ramirez, whose 2009 single, "Downpipe", featured lyrics and vocals by Hyde.

The lead single, "Scribble", produced with Welsh drum and bass producer High Contrast, was released on 28 June 2010. The band released a radio edit of the track for free download on their website on 13 May 2010.

There are seven slightly modified variations of the cover artwork - depending on edition and format - all created by John Warwicker.

== Critical reception ==
Barking received positive reviews from most music critics. At Metacritic, which assigns a normalized rating out of 100 to reviews from mainstream critics, the album received an average score of 67, based on 18 reviews, which indicates "generally favorable reviews". Barry Walters of Spin wrote, "with production help from High Contrast, Dubfire, and Paul Van Dyk, Underworld is freed up to focus on crafting memorable tunes that hark back to their electronica heyday, as well as more personal, coherent lyrics. Earnest emotions surprisingly suit these dance-floor surrealists." BBC Music's Sarah Bee gave the album a positive review, stating: "There's a lightness and a jollity about their music which combines with an unabashed poignancy, and there's a sense of deep contentment and peace about this album. They may not be sticking their necks out as pioneers now but it's not important – they are never less than themselves, and superficial quibbles aside this is the sound of musicians with nothing to prove and everything to give." Record Collector reviewer Daryl Easlea said the album is "possibly Underworld’s poppiest ever [...] yet [it] retains their trademark dark heart". She concluded: "With its tremendous focus, Barking ably demonstrates that, after six albums, Underworld remain the UK’s leading old-school dance combo." Michaelangelo Matos from The A.V. Club described the album as "in some ways, the most tuneful Underworld album yet, which isn’t saying a lot". The NME gave the album a mixed review, stating that the album "tends to fail when it experiments", but praised the songs "Bird 1" and "Moon in Water" for being "in the vein of classic Underworld, simultaneously danceable and menacingly strange."

Resident Advisor reviewer Ian Mathers said the duo "marries a renewed emphasis on the dance floor with unabashedly open-hearted lyrics", and felt that "the songs here are a harmonious marriage of the classic, propulsive Underworld sound and the kind of techniques and textures that postdate most of their career." Ben Weisz of musicOMH gave the album a favourable review, and concluded: "Barking is a mostly-solid album let down by a couple of weak links. It's not earth-shattering, and there are no new Born Slippys, but it's well worth a listen." Australian dance music website inthemix stated that "Barking will, as the frontman seems to suggest, take the group to a new audience – or realign them with the heady days of Born Slippy". Stephen Lussier of The Spill Magazine comments, "The album’s core echoes of a time when careful attention was taken in connecting electronica and vocal expression, thus making this an unquestionably more lyrically-driven album." A reviewer from Music Week felt that the album "is less of a return to form then a continuation of what has come before, from the euphoric dance floor fillers of Between The Stars and Always Loved A Film to the gentle raw piano off closing track Louisiana with the end result reeking in nostalgia of the duo’s mid-90s heyday." In his review for Drowned in Sound, Alex Barker wrote: "This record can be seen as a work of celebration [...] while residing in the comforting notion that they have already proven all that they have to prove. Or it could be considered a somewhat lazy effort, a work more poppy than anything they have previously produced and one in which they know will sell well."

== Track listing ==
=== Standard edition ===
No.	Title	Writer(s)	Producer(s)	Length
1.	"Bird 1"	Karl Hyde, Rick Smith	Rick Smith, Dubfire	6:51
2.	"Always Loved a Film"	Hyde, Smith	Rick Smith, Mark Knight, D. Ramirez	6:52
3.	"Scribble"	Hyde, Smith, Lincoln Barrett	Rick Smith, High Contrast	6:58
4.	"Hamburg Hotel"	Hyde, Smith	Rick Smith, Appleblim, Al Tourettes	5:18
5.	"Grace"	Hyde, Smith	Rick Smith, Dubfire	5:11
6.	"Between Stars"	Hyde, Smith, Darren Price	Rick Smith, Darren Price, Mark Knight & D. Ramirez	6:06
7.	"Diamond Jigsaw"	Hyde, Smith	Rick Smith, Paul van Dyk	5:36
8.	"Moon in Water"	Hyde, Smith, Barrett	Rick Smith, High Contrast	5:42
9.	"Louisiana"	Hyde, Smith	Rick Smith	5:05

Japan bonus tracks
No.	Title	Length
10.	"Simple Peal"	4:34

=== Deluxe Edition ===
DVD: The Films
No.	Title	Director(s)	Length
1.	"Bird 1"	Dylan Kendle
2.	"Always Loved a Film"	Graham Wood
3.	"Scribble"	Toby Vogel
4.	"Hamburg Hotel"	Dylan Kendle, Joost Korngold
5.	"Grace"	Jason Kedgley
6.	"Between Stars"	Michael Horsham
7.	"Diamond Jigsaw"	Simon Taylor, Hudson-Powell
8.	"Moon in Water"	Timothy Bricknell
9.	"Louisiana"	Danielle Short, Toby Vogel

=== Limited Edition ===
Disc 2: Alternative Versions
No.	Title	Length
1.	"Strumpet Groove"	7:10
2.	"Always Loved a Film" (Lemonworld Mix)	7:24
3.	"You Do Scribble"	8:04
4.	"Hamburg Hotel Essex"	3:21
5.	"Grace" (Telematic Peal Mix)	7:37
6.	"Between Stars" (Lemonworld Mix)	4:55
7.	"Diamond Jigsaw" (Demo Mix)	3:51
8.	"Moon in Water" (Lemonworld Mix)	5:53
9.	"Louisiana (Jumping the Cran)"	2:05

DVD: The Films
No.	Title	Director(s)	Length
1.	"Bird 1"	Dylan Kendle
2.	"Always Loved a Film"	Graham Wood
3.	"Scribble"	Toby Vogel
4.	"Hamburg Hotel"	Dylan Kendle, Joost Korngold
5.	"Grace"	Jason Kedgley
6.	"Between Stars"	Michael Horsham
7.	"Diamond Jigsaw"	Simon Taylor, Hudson-Powell
8.	"Moon in Water"	Timothy Bricknell
9.	"Louisiana"	Danielle Short, Toby Vogel
10.	"Always Loved a Film"	Michael Horsham
11.	"Between Stars"	Dylan Kendle, Jason Kedgley

=== Formats ===
- Standard edition – CD jewel case edition containing 9 tracks with an 8-page roll-fold booklet.
- Deluxe Edition – CD and DVD in a 3-panel cardboard packaging with 8-page roll-fold booklet, containing 9 tracks and a DVD with music videos for each track.
- Limited Edition – Box set containing book pack of 32-page artwork and the 9 track CD, an additional CD with alternate versions and a DVD with music videos for each track including two not present on the Deluxe Edition.

== Charts ==
Chart (2010)	Peak position
Australian Albums Chart	46
Belgian Albums Chart (Flanders)	26
Belgian Albums Chart (Wallonia)	29
Dutch Albums Chart	27
European Albums Chart	49
German Albums Chart	73
Irish Albums Chart	36
Swiss Albums Chart	60
UK Albums Chart	26
US Billboard 200	151
US Billboard Dance/Electronic Albums	6
US Billboard Independent Albums	33

In 2010 it was awarded a silver certification from the Independent Music Companies Association, which indicated sales of at least 30,000 copies throughout Europe.

== Release history ==
Region	Date	Label	Format
Japan	2 September 2010	Traffic Inc.	CD, digital download
Europe	13 September 2010	Cooking Vinyl	CD, digital download
United States	14 September 2010	Om Records	CD, digital download
