= Live in Tokyo 25th November 2005 =

Live in Tokyo 25 November 2005

Live album by Underworld
- Released: 10 December 2005
- Recorded: 25 November 2005
- Venue: Makuhari Messe, Tokyo, Japan
- Genre: Electronica
- Length: 178:59
- Label: underworldlive.com
- Producer: Rick Smith

Underworld chronology
Riverrun (2005–2006)	Live in Tokyo 25 November 2005 (2005)	Oblivion with Bells (2007)

Live in Tokyo 25th November 2005 is a 2005 (see 2005 in music) album by Underworld. It is a recording of Underworld's live performance at the Electraglide festival in Tokyo on 25 November 2005.

This limited edition 3-CD set was originally available to order only at the 2005 Electraglide shows in Tokyo and Osaka. It was shipped a few weeks later to attendees who ordered them at the show. After fulfilling the Electraglide attendee orders, Underworld sold the remainder of the stock directly to dirty.org (now borndirty.org) members via semi-private eBay auctions. There were apparently only 7000 copies of the album made.

== Track listing ==
All songs by Underworld unless otherwise noted.

=== 3xCD: UWR / UWR-0500007-3 ===
Disc one

1. "Dinner at Rods / JAL to Tokyo" – 9:03
2. "Mmm...Skyscraper I Love You" – 5:58
3. "Kittens" – 9:06
4. "Moroccan Meatballs" – 2:44 (Darren Price)
5. "Juanita" – 12:05
6. "Spikee" – 5:27
7. "Rez" – 9:28

Disc two

1. "Simple Distinctive" – 3:37
2. "Born Slippy .NUXX 2003" – 14:11
3. "Two Months Off" – 9:42
4. "Aquafunk / Flatz" – 4:35 (Aquafunk by Darren Price)
5. "Peggy Sussed" – 2:29
6. "Lenny Penne" – 5:38
7. "Small Conker and a Twix" – 2:26
8. "You Do Scribble" – 7:30
9. "Back in the Fears / Unknown Song" – 11:39

Disc three

1. "King of Snake" – 10:31
2. "Pearl's Girl" – 3:56
3. "Push Upstairs" – 5:49
4. "Dark & Long (Dark Train)" – 9:36
5. "Yard Beat" – 5:11 (Darren Price)
6. "Jumbo" – 9:20
7. "Rowla" – 9:28
8. "Moaner" – 9:44
