= Cowgirl (Underworld song) =

1994 song by Underworld

Single by Underworld

from the album Dubnobasswithmyheadman
- B-side: "Rez": "Cowgirl" (Winjer Mix); "Cowgirl" (Irish Pub in Kyoto Mix)
- Released: September 1994
- Genre: Progressive house, alternative dance
- Length: 8:55
- Label: Junior Boy's Own, Wax Trax!, Intercord
- Songwriters: Rick Smith, Karl Hyde, Darren Emerson
- Producers: Rick Smith, Karl Hyde, Darren Emerson

Underworld singles chronology
| "Dark & Long" (1994) | "Cowgirl" (1994) | "Dirty Epic" (1994) |

Professional ratings
Review scores
| Source | Rating |
|---|---|
| AllMusic | 4/5 stars |

"Cowgirl" is a song by the British electronic music group Underworld. Originally released as the B-side of their 1993 single "Rez" with the title "Cow Girl", it was later included in the band's 1994 album Dubnobasswithmyheadman in an edited form, and published as a single itself.

In Underworld's live performances, "Cowgirl" is often played with "Rez", as they share key elements and samples. The typical arrangement is to open with "Rez" and mix into "Cowgirl", with the "Rez" melody usually brought back at the climax. The track is usually labelled "Rez / Cowgirl" in fan-distributed bootlegs. This combination also appears on the live album Everything, Everything. Slant Magazine ranked the song number 30 in its 100 Greatest Dance Songs list, adding: "The jewel in the Orwellian dubnobasswithmyheadman’s crown was "Cowgirl"—everything, everything Underworld's thundering electronica has come to represent as a musical and political force."

A key lyrical element in the song is Karl Hyde's repeated chant "Everything, everything," which inspired the title of the live album of the same name. While the version of "Cowgirl" listed on the single is the "album version", the version found on the album Dubnobasswithmyheadman is lightly edited, with a running time of 8:31; the full length version would later appear on the soundtrack to Hackers.

== Track listing ==
=== CD: Intercord / INT 825.421 (Germany) ===
1. "Cowgirl" (album version) – 8:55
2. "Cowgirl" (Irish Pub in Kyoto Mix) – 11:45
3. "Cowgirl" (Winjer Mix) – 6:25
4. "Rez" – 9:55

=== 12": Intercord / INT 193.016 (Germany) ===
1. "Cowgirl" (album version)
2. "Cowgirl" (Irish Pub in Kyoto Mix)

=== 12": Junior Boy's Own / JBO 1001 (UK) ===
Titled Cowgirl / Rez

1. "Rez"
2. "Cowgirl"

=== 12": WaxTrax! TVT / TVT 8724-0 (USA) ===
1. "Cowgirl" (Irish Pub in Kyoto Mix) – 11:45
2. "Cowgirl" (Album Version) – 8:55
3. "Cowgirl" (Winjer Mix) – 6:25

== Cowgirl (Live) ==
"Cowgirl (Live)"

Single by Underworld
- B-side: "Rez"
- Released: 2000
- Genre: Progressive trance
- Length: 3:40
- Label: Junior Boy's Own
- Songwriters: Rick Smith, Karl Hyde, Darren Emerson
- Producers: Rick Smith, Karl Hyde, Darren Emerson

Underworld singles chronology
| "8 Ball" (2000) | "Cowgirl (Live)" (2000) | "Two Months Off" (2002) |

"Cowgirl" (live) was a live recording of "Cowgirl" released by Underworld in 2000, taken from their live album Everything, Everything. It contains newly commissioned remixes of the original song as well as the live recording of "Rez"/"Cowgirl", as featured on the album and video release. The single peaked on the UK Singles Chart at number 24.

== Track listing ==
=== CD: Junior Boy's Own, JBO5012513 (UK) Part 1/2 ===
1. "Cowgirl" (edit) (live) – 3:40
2. "Cowgirl" (Bedrock Mix) – 11:50

- "Cowgirl" (edit) (enhanced live video)

=== CD: Junior Boy's Own, JBO5012618 (UK) Part 2/2 ===
1. "Cowgirl" (Futureshock Mix) – 8:26
2. "Rez/Cowgirl" (live) – 11:32

- "Rez/Cowgirl" (Enhanced live video)

=== CD: Junior Boy's Own, JBO5014828 (SE) ===
1. "Cowgirl" (edit) (live) – 3:40
2. "Cowgirl" (Bedrock Mix) – 11:50

=== CD: Junior Boy's Own, JBO5014823 (EU/AU); V2, V2CI 79 (JP) ===
1. "Cowgirl" (edit) (live) – 3:40
2. "Cowgirl" (Bedrock Mix) – 11:50
3. "Cowgirl" (Futureshock Mix) – 9:30
4. "Rez/Cowgirl" (live) – 11:32

- "Cowgirl" (edit) (enhanced live video)

=== CD: Junior Boy's Own, JBO5012533P (UK) promo ===
1. "Cowgirl" (edit) (live) – 3:40
2. "Cowgirl" (Bedrock Mix) – 11:50
3. "Cowgirl" (Futureshock Mix)" – 8:26

=== 12": Junior Boy's Own, JBO5012516 (UK) ===
1. "Cowgirl" (Bedrock Mix) – 11:50
2. "Cowgirl" (Futureshock Mix) – 9:30

== Charts ==
"Cowgirl (Live)"

| Chart (2000) | Peak position |
|---|---|
| Netherlands (Single Top 100) | 79 |
| UK Singles (Official Charts) | 24 |
