= Oblivion with Bells =

Studio album by Underworld
- Released: 3 October 2007
- Recorded: 2000–2007 at Abbey Road Studios, Lemonworld Studios, and around the world
- Genres: Techno, progressive house, ambient, downtempo
- Length: 58:12
- Labels: Different Recordings, Traffic, Side One Recordings
- Producer: Rick Smith

Underworld chronology
Live in Tokyo 25th November 2005 (2005)	Oblivion with Bells (2007)	Barking (2010)

Singles from Oblivion with Bells
- 1. "Crocodile" Released: 12 September 2007; 2. "Ring Road" Released: 6 July 2008; 3. "Holding the Moth" Released: 7 December 2008

Professional ratings
Aggregate scores
Source	Rating
Metacritic	64/100
Review scores
Source	Rating
AllMusic	3/5 stars
Alternative Press	3.5/5 stars
NME	8/10
Pitchfork	6.0/10
Q	3/5 stars
Record Collector	4/5 stars
Release Magazine	9/10
Resident Advisor	3.5/5 stars
Slant Magazine	3/5 stars
URB	4/5 stars

Oblivion with Bells is the seventh studio album from Underworld, released on 3 October 2007 in Japan, 15 October 2007 in the EU and 16 October 2007 in the US. Due to the success of lead single "Crocodile" and the use of "To Heal" as a central theme in the film Sunshine, Oblivion with Bells has sold over 93,000 copies worldwide, as of 23 May 2008.

== Critical reception ==
Oblivion with Bells received mostly positive reviews from most music critics. The album has a score of 64/100 on Metacritic based on 24 reviews. AllMusic gave the album 3 out of 5 stars saying "The acid techno is firmly in place, with little or no regard for developments in the form after the '80s. Still, unlike other electronica mainstays who have occasionally revealed a little weariness – either from trying to change or trying to stay the same – Underworld never sound particularly tired on Oblivion with Bells". NME gave the album 8/10 saying that "Oblivion With Bells is less the comedown than the sound of the party still going 10 years on". Drowned in Sound gave the album 6/10 saying that "After an auspicious introduction Oblivion With Bells has disappointingly descended into an irreconcilable docile abyss".

== Track listing ==
All songs by Karl Hyde and Rick Smith.

No.	Title	Length
1.	"Crocodile"	6:32
2.	"Beautiful Burnout"	8:11
3.	"Holding the Moth"	5:31
4.	"To Heal"	2:38
5.	"Ring Road"	4:33
6.	"Glam Bucket"	5:48
7.	"Boy, Boy, Boy"	6:07
8.	"Cuddle Bunny vs. The Celtic Villages"	2:24
9.	"Faxed Invitation"	4:46
10.	"Good Morning Cockerel"	2:30
11.	"Best Mamgu Ever"	9:12

Additional track on the Japanese release (Traffic, TRCP10):

12. "Loads of Birds" – 5:30

=== Book of Jam – Video DVD [UWR-00017-5 (UK) and SOR0001 (US) only] ===
1. Crocodile (video) – 3:57
2. Tokyo Makuhari (slideshow with "Boy, Boy, Boy") – 1:32
3. Metal Friend (video) – 1:37
4. Abbey Road Recording Session (slideshow with "Globe") – 1:31
5. Good Morning Cockerel (video) – 2:31
6. Rez Live (video) – 9:28
7. Art Jam (slideshow with "Faxed Invitation") – 1:46

== Release history ==
Country	Release date
Japan	3 October 2007
Europe	15 October 2007
United States	16 October 2007

=== Appearances ===
To Heal appears as part of the score for the movie Sunshine. Glam Bucket and To Heal both appear in the video game Need For Speed Undercover.

=== Translation ===
- The word "mamgu " (pronounced "mam-ghee" ) from the track "Best Mamgu Ever" is the Welsh word for grandmother

== Charts ==
Chart (2007)	Peak position
Belgian Albums Chart	27
Dutch Albums Chart	15
French Albums Chart	134
German Albums Chart	76
Japanese Albums Chart	6
UK Albums Chart	45
US Billboard 200	169
US Billboard Electronic Albums	1
US Billboard Independent Albums	18
