= Underworld (band) =

British electronic music duo

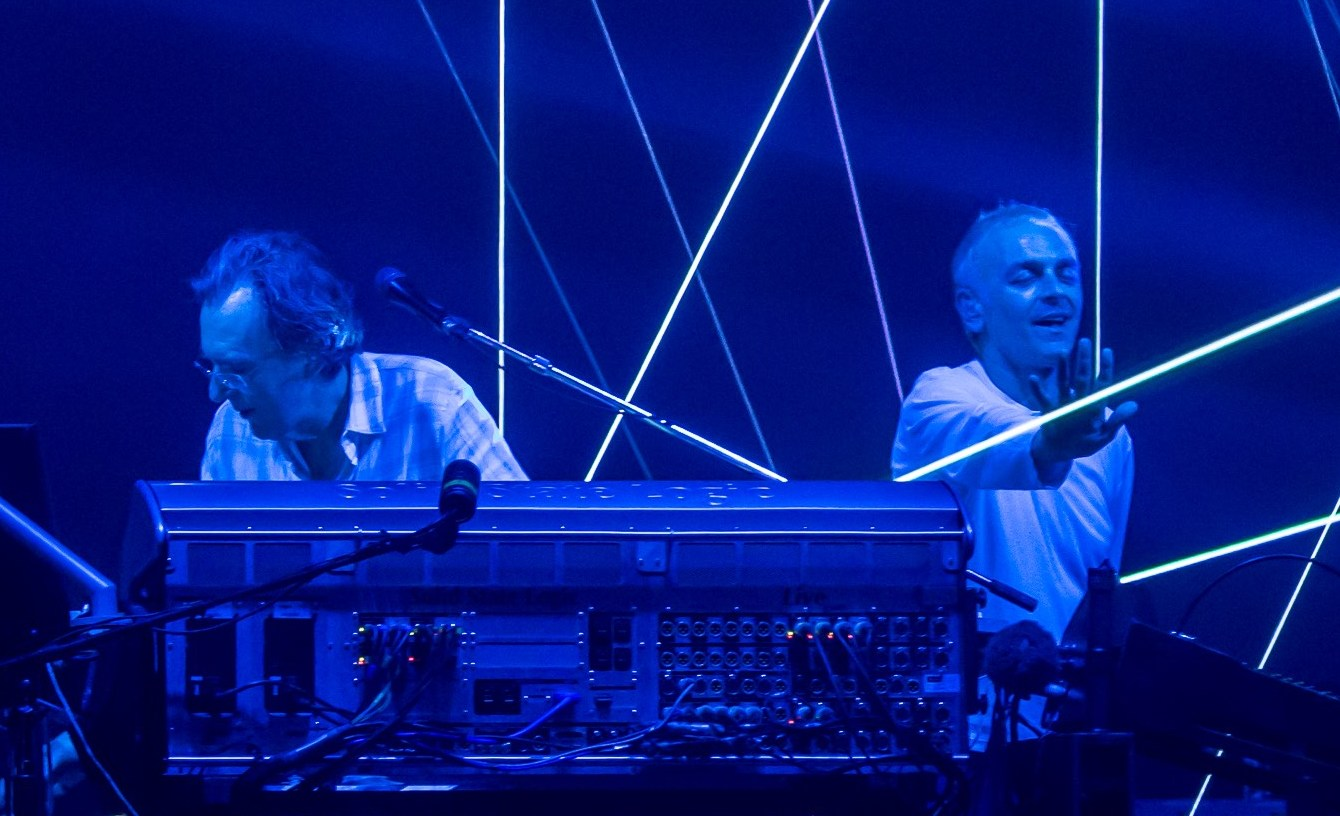
- Underworld at Alexandra Palace in 2017. Left to right: Rick Smith and Karl Hyde

Background information
- Also known as: Lemon Interupt; Steppin' Razor; Mr. and Mrs. Christmas
- Origin: Cardiff, Wales
- Genres: Electronic; progressive house; techno; alternative dance; ambient; downtempo; psychedelic; experimental; synth-pop (early)
- Years active: 1987–present
- Labels: Caroline; UME; Cooking Vinyl; Om; Junior Boy's Own; V2; Wax Trax!; Sire; Warner Bros.; Traffic
- Spinoff of: Freur
- Members: Karl Hyde; Rick Smith
- Past members: Darren Emerson; See band members section for others
- Website: underworldlive.com

Underworld are a British electronic music group formed in 1987 in Cardiff, Wales, and the principal collaborative project of Karl Hyde and Rick Smith.

After briefly performing as a funk and synth-pop outfit, resulting in two albums between 1988 and 1989, Underworld gained prominence after pivoting to dance and techno, releasing albums including Dubnobasswithmyheadman (1994), Second Toughest in the Infants (1996) and Beaucoup Fish (1999), as well as singles "Born Slippy Nuxx" and "Dark & Long (Dark Train)".

Known for their atmospheric, progressive compositions, Hyde's cryptic and stream of consciousness lyrics, and dynamic live performances, Underworld have influenced a wide range of artists, and have featured in soundtracks and scores for films and television.

== History ==
=== The Screen Gemz, Freur, and Underworld Mk1 ===
In the late 1970s, Karl Hyde and Rick Smith formed a band in Cardiff called the Screen Gemz, which was influenced by Kraftwerk and reggae. They were joined by bassist Alfie Thomas, drummer Bryn Burrows, and keyboardist John Warwicker in forming Freur. The band signed to CBS Records and released Doot-Doot (1983). Freur disbanded in 1986 after CBS withheld the UK release of their follow-up album, Get Us Out of Here.

In 1987, Hyde, Smith, Thomas, Burrows and bassist Baz Allen formed Underworld, named after the 1985 horror film Underworld, which was scored by Freur. Underworld signed to Sire Records and released the album Underneath the Radar in 1988. Following the departure of Burrows, they released another album, Change the Weather, in 1989.

This lineup, referred to by the group as "Underworld Mk1", disbanded in 1990. The band had just finished a stadium tour opening for Eurythmics and had incurred a large debt that Smith spent a year attempting to pay off. Hyde stayed in Los Angeles while Smith returned to the United Kingdom. Hyde recalled feeling miserable during the Eurythmics tour, and said of Underworld Mk1, "We’d subvert what we naturally did to fit an idea of what was going to be successful in the charts, and we just weren’t very good at it. We realised we were a band trapped in the body of another band. We were denying what we were."

=== Emerson's arrival and Underworld Mk2 ===
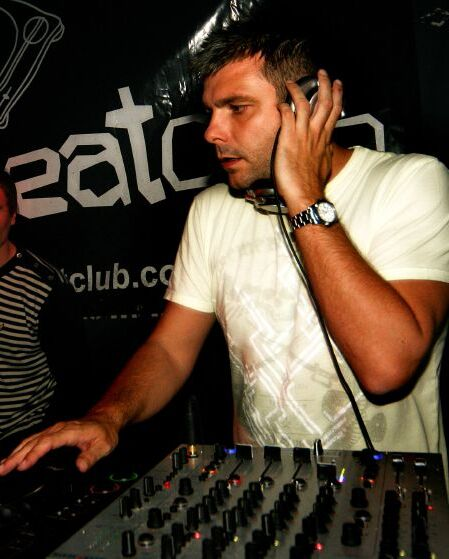
The addition of DJ Darren Emerson marked the group's pivot to techno-oriented music. He left the group in 2000.

After a break—to concentrate on, among other things, art/design project Tomato—Hyde and Smith relocated from South Wales to Romford, Greater London, in 1992. At this time they recruited DJ Darren Emerson and signed to Steven Hall's Junior Boys Own label. After several releases and remixes as Lemon Interupt and Steppin' Razor, they readopted the Underworld moniker. They produced danceable techno as a trio ("Underworld Mk2").

The addition of Emerson completed Underworld's techno/rock fusion and seemed to eliminate the pop elements in the original duo's work. Their third album, Dubnobasswithmyheadman, was considered more accessible than the group's earlier material and crossed a large spectrum of dance music. The signature Hyde lyrics were in place: poetic, hypnotic and whispered; mixing conventional song writing with the use of found material from overheard conversations, answering machine recordings and the like. Hyde had been the lead singer in Underworld Mk1 but the original Hyde/Smith dance material was lyric-free as was most of the electronic music emerging from the aftermath of acid house.

Their song "Cowgirl" appears in the 1995 movie Hackers.

"Rez"
The band's 1993 dance anthem, "Rez".

=== Trainspotting and breakthrough ===
The band's 1996 album, Second Toughest in the Infants, was their second studio album with Emerson and achieved a degree of commercial success, due in part to its release coinciding with that of the film Trainspotting. The film featured "Dark & Long (Dark Train)", as well as the band's most commercially successful track to date, "Born Slippy Nuxx", which was originally released only as a B-side of a single and does not appear on the Second Toughest album. The single and the album showed Underworld maturing as a trio, mixing elements of techno, house, drum and bass and experimental music. "Born Slippy .NUXX" is one of Underworld's best-known tracks and is celebrated as one of the greatest dance tracks of the decade.

Underworld's first festival performance in America was at the Organic Music Festival '96 on June 22, 1996 at the Snow Valley Ski Resort in Running Springs, California.

=== Beaucoup Fish era ===
After the release of fifth studio album Beaucoup Fish in 1999, Hyde declared in his interviews that he had sorted out earlier problems with alcoholism but all the members admitted that the sessions had been fraught with problems, with the individual members working in their own studios and only communicating via mixes of the raw material passed back and forth on DAT. After the release of the album a large number of mixes of the album tracks seemed to surface on singles, magazine promotional CDs and similar ephemeral formats perhaps indicating the number of revisions the tracks had gone through to get to the point where they were acceptable to all three. The album's name derives from a sample of a Cajun fisherman in Louisiana on the track "Jumbo". The band originally wanted to call the album Tonight, Matthew, I'm going to be Underworld (a catchphrase used by contestants on the UK ITV programme Stars in Their Eyes) but were convinced by their record company, Junior Boy's Own, that the name would not be easily understood outside the UK. Finally, after all the singles had been released, a box set, Beaucoup Fish Singles, which was a retrospective of all 4 singles came out.

Underworld embarked on a well-received tour in 1999, which resulted in a live CD and DVD drawn from several dates on the tour. Called Everything, Everything, the project captured the live Underworld experience very faithfully. A companion DVD was released separately soon after the album's release. The DVD features live footage of the band mixed with videography and artistic effects by the design group Tomato. The DVD also features several songs not on the album: "Moaner", "Puppies", "Kittens" and "Rowla". The disco scene in Vanilla Sky features Underworld's 1993 hit "Rez". Their tour was also documented by Danish film director Helene Moltke-Leth and shown on The Danish National Broadcasting Corporation (DR).

=== Emerson's departure and back to a duo ===
After the release and promotion of Everything, Everything, Emerson decided to leave Underworld to focus on his solo projects and record label. Hyde and Smith decided to continue as a duo. They recorded a new album, A Hundred Days Off, released to general approval. Despite its status as the band's first studio album since Emerson's departure, its general sound and feel was, perhaps surprisingly for many Underworld fans, not dissimilar to the previous albums on which Emerson had had input. In 2003, a 2-disc anthology entitled 1992–2002 was released. This was the first appearance on an album of previously unavailable single tracks and B-sides, such as "Bigmouth", "Spikee", "Dirty" and "8 Ball". While touring in the summer and autumn of 2005, the duo was joined on stage by Darren Price, a DJ and producer who had remixed Underworld releases in the past.

During their tour, they released a 3-CD set Live in Tokyo, which was sold after the concert in Japan and later sold online. In late 2005, they released two compilations of new songs with accompanying photographs on Underworld Live, in a series entitled Riverrun. These were only released online, with no physical release (except for a promo CD). On 5 June 2006, they released their third installment, and on 10 July 2006, they released The Misterons Mix, a special retrospective mix composed of Riverrun tracks, as an exclusive free download for customers that had purchased all three Riverrun releases.

In September 2006, Underworld released five limited edition (10,000 copies each) 12" vinyl releases, containing remixes of various Riverrun tracks. These tracks were also made available for purchase by digital download on the Beatport website. Later in 2006, the band teamed up with Gabriel Yared to compose the music score to Anthony Minghella's film Breaking and Entering. The soundtrack was released in the UK on 6 November, and in the USA on 5 December.

=== Oblivion with Bells ===
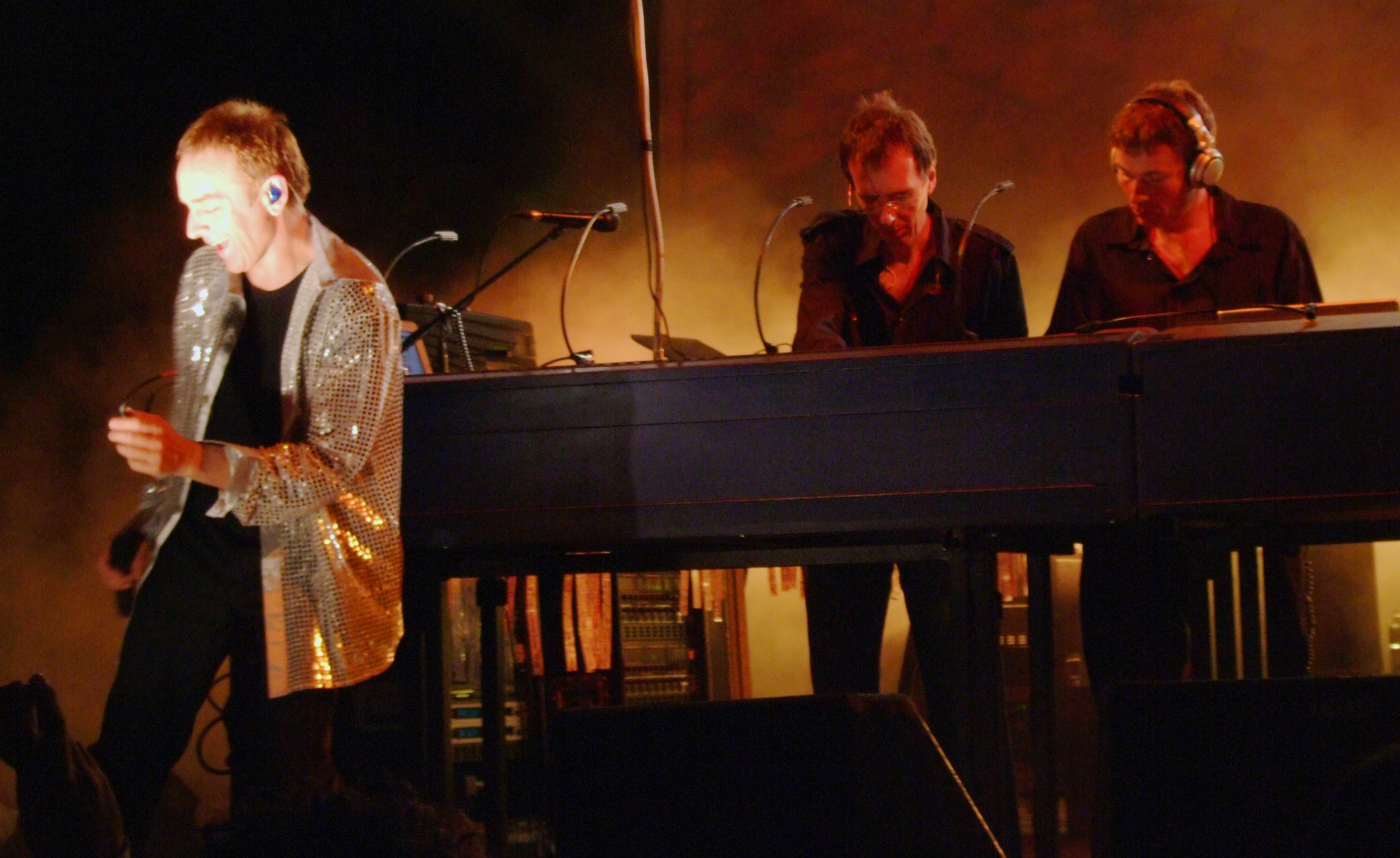
Underworld performing "Jumbo" in Central Park, New York City, 2007.

Underworld's seventh studio album, Oblivion with Bells, was released on 16 October 2007. The first single from the new album, "Crocodile", was released on 5 September 2007. U2's drummer Larry Mullen Jr helped out on the track "Boy, Boy, Boy". Underworld, in collaboration with composer John Murphy, completed the soundtrack to the Danny Boyle film, Sunshine, in late 2006. Well over a year after the film's release, the official soundtrack was released on iTunes on 25 November 2008.

On 16 June 2007, Underworld were forced to cancel their show at the Ejekt Festival in Athens, Greece. Approximately 30 masked Greek anarchists stormed the stadium while the Beastie Boys were performing. Rick Smith was one of the people injured in the ensuing violence and he was taken to a nearby Athens hospital for treatment. On 19 October 2007, Underworld cancelled the remaining dates of their European tour due to illness in the band. The tour was picked up again on 28 January 2008, with a concert in Cologne, followed by 16 dates in Europe, including some festivals.

On 8 August 2008, Underworld appeared at the All Points West Music & Arts Festival in Liberty State Park, New Jersey. Karl Hyde appeared with Brian Eno on the final day of the Eno-curated Luminous Festival at Sydney Opera House. "Pure Scenius" consisted of three live improvised performances on the same day, featuring Eno, Hyde, Australian improv trio the Necks, electronic artist Jon Hopkins and guitarist Leo Abrahams.

Underworld has released two new series via their underworldlive.com site, in mp3 and WAV formats. The tracks are 020202, and the phonestrap/autotrader series. On 3 July 2009, Underworld debuted a new song tentatively titled "Between Stars" at the Montreux Jazz Festival. Shortly before that, a post was made on the band's diary page showing a piece of paper with the song's first verse on it. On 8 August 2009, a show at Los Angeles' Forum was cancelled in circumstances similar to those that led to the group cancelling the show in Athens two years prior. Some of the crowd were climbing down the seats and onto the main floor, a potential safety hazard. The group apologized on their website for having the show called off.

On 8 March 2010, Mark Knight and D. Ramirez released the single "Downpipe", which featured vocal contributions from Underworld's Karl Hyde. The song, released on Mark Knight's Toolroom Records label, has a music video featuring the "Playhouse", a lighting setup on Liberty Hall, the tallest building in Dublin.

=== Barking ===
On 13 May 2010, the band released a track called "Scribble" for download on the band's site. The track shares elements with "You Do Scribble", an unreleased song which they featured many times since 2005 in their live performance shows. The track is a collaboration with High Contrast, a drum and bass DJ also from Cardiff. On 14 May, the full version of "Scribble" was featured on Pete Tong's Radio 1 radio show, declaring it as Essential New Tune of the week. The group also released a video clip for "Scribble" on YouTube. It has been commercially released on 28 June as the lead single from their latest album.

Underworld's eighth studio album, Barking, was released on 13 September 2010 in the UK. The album features collaborations with German trance producer Paul van Dyk and British house artists Mark Knight and D. Ramirez, among others.

On 25 August 2010, Rick Smith released a limited edition solo album Bungalow With Stairs 1, music to accompany "What's Going on in Your Head When You're Dancing" an exhibition of paintings by Karl Hyde at the Laforet Museum, Harajuku, Tokyo during 2010. The album was available from the band's website and was packaged with the exhibition catalogue. In December 2010 it was announced that Underworld would reunite with Trainspotting director Danny Boyle to write the musical score for his production of Frankenstein at the Royal National Theatre. The production was broadcast as a part of National Theatre Live on 17 March 2011, with a soundtrack release on Underworld's website in March 2011.

=== Anthology, the Olympics and solo projects ===
In November 2011, Underworld announced two new compilations, A Collection and 1992–2012 Anthology. A Collection features many of the band's biggest tracks alongside recent collaborations with High Contrast featuring Tiësto & Underworld ("The First Note Is Silent"), Mark Knight & D. Ramirez ("Downpipe") and Brian Eno ("Beebop Hurry"). 1992–2012 Anthology is a 3-disc set and is a refreshed and revisited version of 1992–2002 with more material, unreleased tracks and rarities to go some way to completing the picture of the first two decades of Underworld.

In December 2011, Underworld were chosen to direct the music for the opening ceremony of the 2012 Summer Olympics, reprising their partnership with filmmaker and ceremony director Danny Boyle. The band also contributed two original tracks for the opening ceremony: "And I Will Kiss" (featuring Dame Evelyn Glennie with the Pandemonium Drummers) and "Caliban's Dream" in collaboration with the Dockhead Choir, Dame Evelyn Glennie, Only Men Aloud, Elizabeth Roberts, Esme Smith (band member Rick Smith's daughter) and Alex Trimble. Underworld contributed 11 of the 36 tracks on the soundtrack, Isles of Wonder. For their work on the Olympics, Underworld won the 2012 Q Award for Innovation in Sound.

On 22 April 2013, Karl Hyde released his debut solo album Edgeland. In 2014, he went on to release two collaborative albums with Brian Eno titled Someday World on 5 May and High Life on 30 June. Rick Smith went on to do some solo work, with two of his musical works being for projects by frequent collaborator director Danny Boyle. His first work was the soundtrack to Boyle's 2013 film Trance and the score for the 2014 British drama television series Babylon which Boyle co-created and directed the 90 minute pilot.

=== Reissues and Barbara Barbara, We Face a Shining Future ===
In 2014, the group announced their intention to release remastered and expanded editions of all of their studio albums "in the next few years". An expanded edition of Dubnobasswithmyheadman was released on 6 October 2014 and the group toured in support of the album. An expanded edition of Second Toughest in the Infants was released on 20 November 2015. Just four days after the re-release of Second Toughest, on 24 November, Underworld announced a new album (their first studio album in six years) titled Barbara Barbara, We Face a Shining Future, released on 18 March 2016. The album earned a 2017 Grammy Award nomination for Best Dance/Electronic Album. They embarked on a brief European tour in support of the album. The tour was later expanded to include the United States, Japan and Australia. In 2017, joining once again with frequent collaborator Danny Boyle, Smith wrote the musical score and produced the soundtrack for T2 Trainspotting. On 25 August 2017, they released an expanded, remastered edition of Beaucoup Fish.

=== The World of Underworld and Drift ===
On 21 May 2018, Underworld announced a new project called the World of Underworld. Part of the project involves reflecting on and sometimes reimagining their nearly 30 year body of work. But it also serves as an outlet for experimentation, new releases, and spontaneous creativity. The first new song released as part of the World of Underworld, "Brilliant Yes That Would Be", was recorded and mixed just days before it was released. Another new song, "Bells & Circles", was a collaboration with Iggy Pop that came out of sessions recorded a couple years earlier for possible inclusion on the T2 Trainspotting soundtrack. The remaining songs from that collaboration formed a joint four-track EP Teatime Dub Encounters, released on 27 July 2018.

On 1 November 2018, Underworld started a year-long experimental music-and-video project named Drift, which aimed to release the band's new and previously unreleased material on a weekly basis. The full album titled Drift Series 1 was released on 1 November 2019, and concluded the band's 52 week Drift project. Drift Series 1 received critical acclaim. On Metacritic, a review aggregator that assigns a normalised rating out of 100 to reviews from mainstream critics, the album received an average score of 86, based on 6 reviews, which indicates "universal acclaim".

=== Remixes and Strawberry Hotel ===
On 27 May 2021, a "2021 Edition" of "Two Months Off" was released. Later that year on 28 October, a "Drift 2 Dark Train" version of "Dark & Long (Dark Train)" was released. Exactly a year after the re-release of "Two Months Off", "Juanita 2022" was released, a remix of "Juanita".

On 3 April 2023, the first single of Strawberry Hotel, "And the Colour Red", was released.

== Influence on video game composers ==
Underworld have been mentioned as an influence by a number of video game composers, such as Nobuyoshi Sano, Andrew Sega, Jesper Kyd, Michiel van den Bos, and Rom Di Prisco.

== Charity ==
In 2008, the band participated in an album called Songs for Tibet, "to express our support for the Tibetan people... at a time when the eyes of the world are on China" (referring to the 2008 Summer Olympics in Beijing). The album was issued on 5 August via iTunes and on 19 August in music stores around the world.

== Band members ==
Current members

- Karl Hyde – vocals, guitars (1987–present)
- Rick Smith – keyboards and mixing, backing vocals (1987–present)

Former members

- Bryn Burrows – drums (1987–1988)
- Alfie Thomas – guitars, keyboards, bass (1987–1990)
- Baz Allen – bass (1987–1990)
- Pascal Consoli – drums (1989–1990)
- Darren Emerson – keyboards and mixing (1990–2000)

Touring members

- Darren Price – keyboards and mixing (2005–2016)

== Discography ==
Studio albums

- Underneath the Radar (1988)
- Change the Weather (1989)
- Dubnobasswithmyheadman (1994)
- Second Toughest in the Infants (1996)
- Beaucoup Fish (1999)
- A Hundred Days Off (2002)
- Oblivion with Bells (2007)
- Barking (2010)
- Barbara Barbara, We Face a Shining Future (2016)
- Drift Series 1 (2019)
- Strawberry Hotel (2024)
