= Tomato (design collective) =

British design and film collective

- Type: Privately held company
- Industry: Marketing
- Founded: 1991
- Headquarters: London, Melbourne, Tokyo
- Website: www.tomato.co.uk

Tomato is a multi-discipline design and film collective, founded in London in 1991 by Steve Baker, Dirk van Dooren, Simon Taylor, John Warwicker and Graham Wood, plus musicians Karl Hyde and Rick Smith of the electronic group Underworld and Colin Vearncombe, the artist also known as Black. They were joined by Jason Kedgley in 1994.

The collective includes a worldwide group of directors, designers, artists, writers, producers and composers, who develop cross-platform projects that are commercial, artistic and research based.

Tomato has published the books, Process, Bareback, and Tycho's Nova.

In addition to its core studio in London, Tomato has a presence in Melbourne and Tokyo. In 2012, Tomato opened its first wholly owned US entity, Tomato Studios, with a main creative/production studio in Los Angeles and field office in New York. In 2014, Tomato signed an agreement with production company Twist Films for exclusive director representation in the US, and co-development of creative projects.

== Publications ==
- Process: A Tomato Project. London: Thames & Hudson, 1996. ISBN 978-0500279151.
- Bareback: A Tomato Project. London: Laurence King, 1999. ISBN 978-1856691604.
- Tycho's Nova: A Tomato Project. By Graham Wood. Self-published, 2001. ISBN 978-0954017309.
