= Darren Emerson =

English musician and DJ

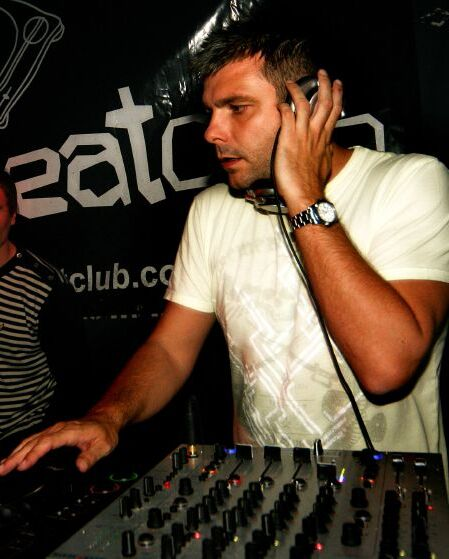
- Darren Emerson performing in 2007

Background information
- Born: Darren Paul Emerson; 30 April 1971 (age 55)
- Origin: Hornchurch, London, England
- Genres: Electronic, house, techno, progressive house, progressive trance, breakbeat
- Occupations: DJ, producer
- Years active: 1987–present
- Labels: Time Unlimited, Thrive, Underwater, K7, Boxed, Global Underground
- Formerly of: Underworld
- Website: www.darrenemerson.com

Darren Paul Emerson (born 30 April 1971) is an English DJ, producer and musician best known as a former member of the British electronic music group Underworld.

== Career ==
=== Early life ===
Emerson began mixing hip hop records at the age of 14, and by 16 was DJing regularly at local venues. He began to explore House Music and quickly acquired a reputation as one of the top British DJs, and demand for his services saw him playing at top clubs such as The Milk Bar, Limelight, and Venus. Emerson has garnered several accolades such as "DJ of the Month" in The Face and i-D magazines.

=== Underworld ===
In 1992, Rick Smith and Karl Hyde relocated to Romford, where Martin Prudence, brother-in-law of Smith, introduced Emerson to him, with Hyde inviting Emerson to become the third member of techno band Underworld. Emerson's experience DJing in London clubs was an inspiration for Smith, who began making music inspired by the sounds of the then burgeoning British electronic music scene. With Emerson on board, Underworld completed their transition from the synth-pop sound of their first two albums to the techno and acid house sound of subsequent releases. Underworld's first album to feature Emerson, 1994's dubnobasswithmyheadman, was their commercial and critical breakthrough, being called "The most important album since The Stone Roses and the best since Screamadelica…" by Melody Maker.

In 1995, whilst working on their second album, Second Toughest in the Infants, they released the single "Born Slippy .NUXX", which was then re-released in 1996 and became a hit following its inclusion on the soundtrack to Trainspotting.

Emerson left Underworld in 2000, following the release of 1999's Beaucoup Fish. He cited becoming a father as the main factor in leaving the band. His final appearance with Underworld was on their 2000 live album Everything, Everything.

=== Solo releases ===
Emerson founded a record label called Underwater in 1994; originally started as a platform to release friends music as well as his own, Underwater has gone on to celebrate 100 releases ranging from techno to house and progressive house. Underwater ran a regular party night at super club Pacha, Ibiza alongside fellow DJ Erick Morillo's Subliminal label from 2001. The duo won 'Best Ibiza Set' in the 2001 DJ Magazine awards.

Emerson also emerged as a much sought-after remix talent, with remixes for acts such as the Chemical Brothers and Björk.

Emerson has released three DJ mix albums on the Global Underground label, Global Underground 015: Uruguay in 2000, Global Underground 020: Singapore in 2001, and Global Underground 036: Bogotá in 2009.

In 2010, he launched a new label, Detone, focusing on club releases by himself and like-minded producers. He played a regular bi-monthly resident slot at London club The End until its closure in 2009 and performed at Sensation White in Amsterdam in 2007.

Since 2017, Emerson has toured as part of 3D, a DJ group also featuring Danny Howells and Dave Seaman.

== Personal life ==
Emerson was in a relationship with British TV presenter Kate Thornton from 2004. They got engaged in 2007 but ended their relationship in 2011. They have one son named Ben, born in May 2008. Emerson also has three daughters.

== Discography ==
=== Solo releases ===
- Psychotrance 2 (1994)
- Mixmag Live!, Vol. 13 (1996)
- Cream Separates (1997)
- Global Underground: Uruguay (2000)
- Global Underground: Singapore (2001)
- Summer Love 2001: DJ Emerson & D. Dreyer (2001)
- Underwater, Episode 1 (2002)
- H2O (12 inch) (2002)
- Underwater, Episode 2 (2003)
- Underwater, Episode 3 (2004)
- Underwater, Episode 4 (2005)
- Bouncer (2005)
- H2O EP (2005)
- Underwater, Episode 5 (2006)
- Crashjack (2008)
- Global Underground: Bogotá (2009)
- Dark Matter: (with Jamie McHugh) (2009)
- where we came from: (with Jamie McHugh) (2010)

=== Extended plays ===
- Au Go Go (2010, Detone)
- Hyper City Missiles (2012)
- Deadlock (2017)
- Birdcage (2018)

=== Singles ===
- "Scorchio" (with Sasha) (2000)
- "H2O" (2002)
- "Home" (2009)
- "Hot Dog" (2013, Bedrock)
- "Vamos" (2014)

=== With Underworld ===
- dubnobasswithmyheadman (1994)
- Second Toughest in the Infants (1996)
- Beaucoup Fish (1999)
- Everything, Everything (2000)

== DJ Magazine Top 100 DJs ==
Year	Position	Notes	Ref.
1997	44	New Entry	
1998	58	Down 14	
1999	70	Down 12	
2000	34	Up 36	
2001	30	Up 4	
2002	39	Down 2	
2003	53	Down 14	
Hiatus
2005	233	Out	
Hiatus
2007	237	Out	
