= Boy's Own (record label) =

English record label

- Founded: 1986
- Founder: Terry Farley; Andrew Weatherall; Cymon Eckel; Steven Mayes; Steven Hall; Pete Heller
- Genre: Electronic
- Country of origin: United Kingdom
- Location: London, England
- Official website: www.boysownproductions.com

Boy's Own is an English fanzine, promoter, and record label specialising in electronic dance music. Underworld, the Chemical Brothers and X-Press 2 are its most successful artists.

== History ==
The origins of Boy's Own go back to 1986, when a group of young clubbers started a fanzine of the same name, inspired by a similar fanzine for Liverpool football fans called The End, edited by future singer of the Farm, Peter Hooton; the title Boys Own had been used by several boys' adventure magazines from about 1850 to 1950. The Boy's Own crew, consisting of Terry Farley, Andrew Weatherall, Cymon Eckel and Steven Mayes, knew fellow Chelsea fan Paul Oakenfold and through their connections with him they were invited to the early acid house club nights that Oakenfold was holding in London.

As the crew began to become more involved in clubbing, the fanzine began to cover the nascent scene, becoming its key chronicler and influencing a wave of similar fanzines across the country. In 1988, they began hosting their own events, and in 1990 they formed Boy's Own Recordings (1990–1993) with London Records/FFRR releasing music by Bocca Juniors, One Dove, Jah Wobble, D.S.K, Denim and Less Stress.

In 1992, Farley and Steven Hall formed the offshoot Junior Boy's Own/Junior Recordings. The label was run by Hall, with A&R shared by them both. Farley focused on house singles, with releases by him and Pete Heller as Bocca Juniors, Fire Island, and Roach Motel, as well as from X-Press 2, Ballistic Brothers, and others. Hall signed album-orientated live acts including the Chemical Brothers, Black Science Orchestra and Underworld. During the late 1990s, the label split in two, with 12" vinyl dance tracks being released by Junior London and album projects through Hall's new joint venture label JBO, which partnered with Richard Branson's V2 and then Parlophone/EMI. The label wound down in the mid-2000s.

== Selected discography ==
=== Albums ===
- Dubnobasswithmyheadman, Underworld, 1994
- Exit Planet Dust, the Chemical Brothers, 1995
- London Hooligan Soul, Ballistic Brothers, 1995
- Walters Room, Black Science Orchestra, 1996

=== Compilations ===
- Junior Boy's Own, various artists, 1994
