= Karl Hyde =

English musician (born 1957)

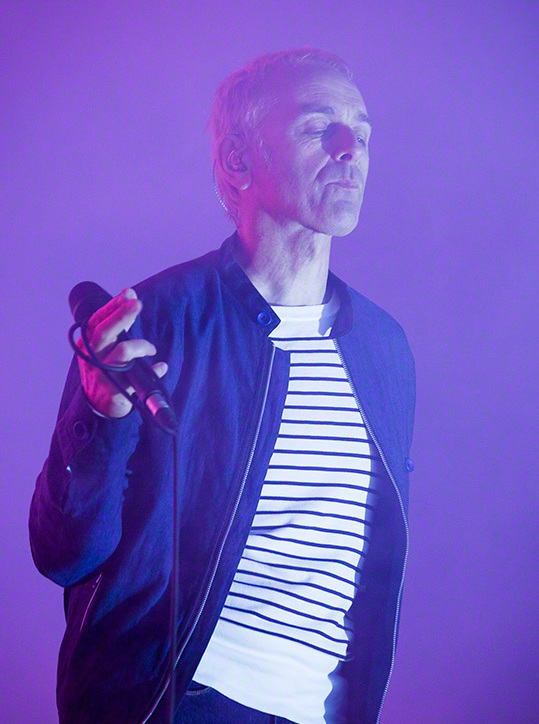
- Hyde performing in 2016

Background information
- Born: Karl Hyde; 10 May 1957 (age 69)
- Origin: Bewdley, Worcestershire, England
- Genres: Electronic; trance; progressive house; experimental
- Occupations: Singer; musician
- Instruments: Vocals; guitar; synthesizer
- Years active: 1978–present
- Website: karlhyde.underworldlive.com

Karl Hyde (born 10 May 1957) is an English musician, composer and artist. He is a founding member of British electronic group Underworld. Hyde has also released a solo album, made albums with Brian Eno and Matthew Herbert, and contributed towards the score for the London 2012 Summer Olympics opening ceremony alongside his Underworld bandmate Rick Smith.

He is a founding member of the multi-discipline design and film collective Tomato and has published several books.

== Career ==
Hyde grew up in Bewdley, England. He moved to Cardiff in the late 1970s to study at Cardiff College of Art. There he formed the new wave-synthpop band Freur in 1982 with Rick Smith and Alfie Thomas. The band released two albums, Doot-Doot (1983) and Get Us Out of Here (1986), before renaming themselves as Underworld in 1987. In 1992, the band had relocated to Romford, London, after the addition of Darren Emerson to their line-up. After Emerson left the band in 2000, Hyde and Smith remained active as a duo, and have continued to record since.

Karl Hyde has collaborated with Raymond Watts of Pig and is credited as playing guitar on the 1993 album The Swining as well as co-writing and playing guitar on the song "Shell" from the 1995 album Sinsation.

He contributed towards the score for the London 2012 Summer Olympics opening ceremony, alongside Underworld's Rick Smith who was the ceremony's Musical Director.

In January 2013, Hyde announced the release date for his debut solo album, Edgeland. It was released worldwide on 22 April that year through Universal. It was co-produced by Leo Abrahams.

In 2014, Hyde collaborated with English musician and record producer Brian Eno on the album Someday World, which was released on Warp. The first single from this album, "The Satellites", was released in March 2014. Within weeks of the album's release, it was announced that a second album, High Life, would be released on 30 June (1 July in North America), also through Warp. In 2017, he collaborated with the director Simon Graham and the playwright Simon Stephens to produce the play Fatherland at the Royal Exchange in Manchester.

Hyde performed at Coachella 2023.

== Personal life ==
Hyde's daughter, Tyler Hyde, performs in the experimental rock band Black Country, New Road.

== Discography ==
=== With the Screen Gemz ===
- I Just Can't Stand Cars / Teenage Teenage (7" Single, 1979)

=== Solo album by Hyde ===
- Edgeland (Universal, 2013) – co-produced by Leo Abrahams

=== Singles by Hyde ===
- "Cut Clouds" (Universal, 2013)
- "The Boy with the Jigsaw Puzzle Fingers" (Universal, 2013)

=== Albums with others ===
- Someday World (Warp, 2014) – with Brian Eno
- High Life (Warp, 2014) – with Brian Eno
- Fatherland (Original Music from the Stage Show) (Universal, 2017) – with Matthew Herbert

== Publications ==
=== Publication by Hyde ===
- I Am Dogboy: The Underworld Diaries. London: Faber and Faber, 2016. ISBN 978-0571328659. Contains diary entries, autobiographical writing, photographs and abstract poetry.

=== Publications paired with John Warwicker ===
- Mmm ... Skyscraper I Love You: a Typographic Journal of New York. London: Booth-Clibborn, 2002. ISBN 978-1873968581.
- In the Belly of Saint Paul. Underworld Print, 2003. ISBN 978-0954613105.
