= Rick Smith (musician) =

Welsh musician (born 1959)

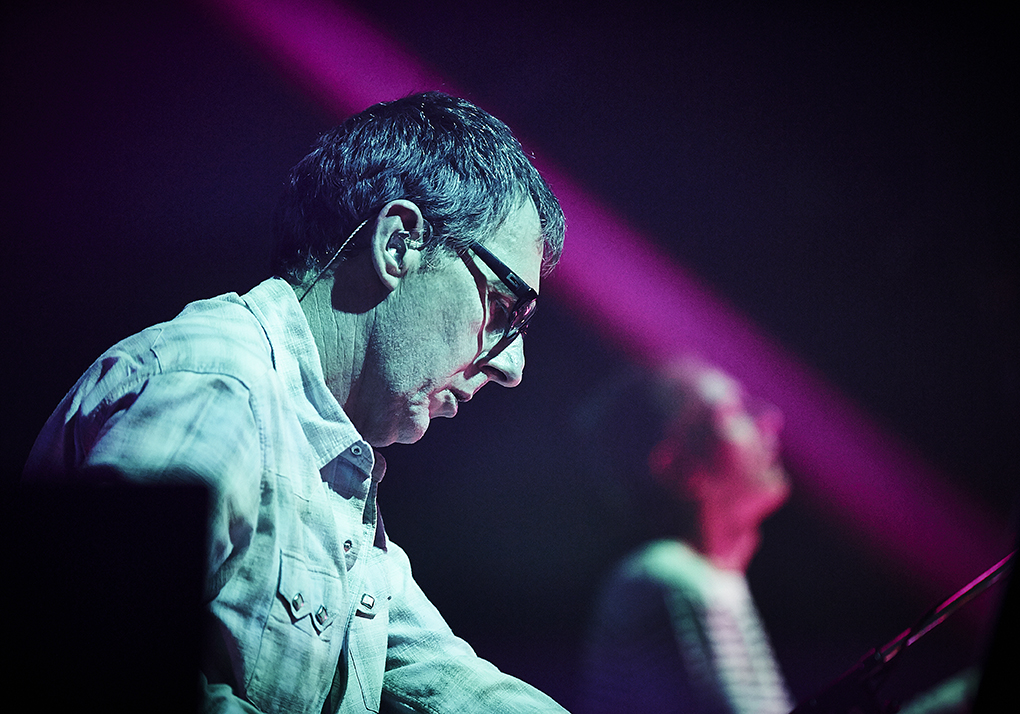
- Smith at the Roundhouse with Underworld in 2016

Background information
- Born: Richard Smith; 25 May 1959 (age 67); Ammanford, Carmarthenshire, Wales
- Genres: Electronic, progressive house, progressive trance, ambient, experimental
- Occupations: Musician, composer
- Instruments: Keyboards, synthesisers
- Years active: 1978–present
- Website: www.underworldlive.com

Richard Smith (born 25 May 1959) is a Welsh musician and composer. He is a founding member of British electronic music group Underworld and an acclaimed composer, having collaborated extensively with director Danny Boyle, most notably as the musical director for the London 2012 Summer Olympics Opening Ceremony, alongside Underworld's Karl Hyde. He is also a founding member of the multi-discipline design and film collective Tomato.

== Career ==
Smith left a bank clerk job in Llanelli to do an electronic and electrical engineering degree; however, he dropped out during his finals after being asked to join Hyde’s band The Screen Gemz. In 1983, they formed the new wave band Freur and recorded two albums for CBS Records International. The group disbanded in 1986.

In 1987, Smith and Hyde formed Underworld, and the pair are the longest and only original serving members of the musical project, still performing together today.

Smith worked with director Danny Boyle for two decades after the director used the band's music in his 1996 film Trainspotting. As part of Underworld, Smith scored the soundtrack for Boyle's stage production of Frankenstein in 2011, and in 2012 undertook a solo venture creating the soundtrack to Boyle's film Trance. Smith was appointed the musical director for the 2012 Summer Olympics opening ceremony which was directed by Boyle. Smith worked with Boyle on his 2017 follow-up film T2 Trainspotting.
