= Aluphone =

Tuned percussion instrument

Percussion instrument
- Classification: Percussion
- Developed: 2011

Musicians
- Evelyn Glennie, Colin Currie, Martin Grubinger

The Aluphone is a tuned percussion instrument consisting of aluminum bells that are struck with a mallet to produce musical tones. In its standard configuration, the bells of the Aluphone are mounted on a frame, but it can also be played as a single handheld bell or as a stack of bells. The bells of the Aluphone are very durable, so they can be struck with a large variety of mallets, wands, or hammers depending on the tone that the musician seeks to produce. There are several different models of the Aluphone, such as piccolo or bass. These different models, found on the Aluphone website, are used to extend the range of the original two and a half octave performance Aluphone.

The Aluphone is closely associated with Evelyn Glennie, who played the instrument in the opening ceremony of the 2012 Summer Olympics.

The Aluphone has also been extensively used in several corps in the Drum Corps International as front ensemble instruments. The corps that have used the Aluphone include the Blue Devils, the Crusaders, and the Vanguard.

== History ==
According to Harry Ellis, the idea for the Aluphone was developed at a trade show that two men, Michael Hansen and Kai Stensgaard, were separately attending. At the trade show, Hansen was showcasing aluminum cones that were designed to protect the tops of wooden posts. As a musician, Stensgaard was curious about the sound the cones would make when he struck. He was impressed with the tone created by the metal cones when struck and asked if Hansen could produce cones that would produce an assortment of unique pitches that could be incorporated into a playable instrument. Hansen agreed to work with Stensgaard on the project. In 2011, Stensgaard presented the Aluphone for the first time at PASIC, a convention held by the Percussive Arts Society.

In an interview, Glennie stated that she was not involved in the creation of the original Aluphone. After becoming interested in the instrument, she worked with Hansen and Stensgaard to develop a new version of the Aluphone, sometimes called the Glennie Aluphone, for her to play at an upcoming performance of Caliban's Dream at the 2012 Summer Olympics.

Stensgaard presented the Aluphone at PASIC again in 2013. Stensgaard stated: "A lot of people know the instrument now and really like the sound. Composers are writing for it."

Adam Schoenberg made use of the Aluphone in a 2013 orchestral composition called Bounce. He believes that it was the first time that original music was composed for the Aluphone in an orchestral arrangement.

Glennie played the Aluphone again in a 2015 performance of Dithyrambs at Cadogan Hall, receiving favorable reviews. She struck the bells of the Aluphone in a variety of ways to produce sounds ranging from those of a glockenspiel to that of a gong.
