= Marc Wolff =

American helicopter pilot

Marc Harold Wolff (born 25 August 1947) is an American helicopter stunt pilot.

== Early life ==
Wolff was born in Chicago. He grew up and went to school in New Jersey.

== Career ==
=== Military ===
Wolff was drafted into the US Army and sent to flight school. At 21 he became the youngest captain in the army. During the Vietnam War, he flew helicopters. In his military career, he won 22 awards of the Air Medal, and a Bronze Star. He quit the army after being posted to Germany and became a commercial pilot.

=== Feature films ===
He has worked on many action films as an aerial coordinator, working on over 170 films. He worked on his first film in 1974. On films, he works with the second unit. Where an aerial sequence (often found in action and science-fiction films) is required, he coordinates the aerial shot from a helicopter. In 1979, he shot flying scene on Hoth in The Empire Strikes Back.

=== Flying Pictures ===
He works with Flying Pictures of the UK, based at the former RAF Chilbolton in the Test Valley district of western Hampshire. He began working with them in the 1980s, helping expand the company from a hot-air balloon business to including helicopter filming services.

In the 2000s Wolff worked on all of the Harry Potter films.

In the 2012 Summer Olympics opening ceremony, he flew the helicopter for the section flying along the River Thames, next to Big Ben, entitled Isles of Wonder, also known as Journey along the Thames. He also flew the helicopter for the pre-recorded sequence known as Happy and Glorious, flying it straight through Tower Bridge, with camerawork by John Marzano. The sequence ended with an AgustaWestland AW139 flying above the Olympic Stadium, with the Queen portrayed by Herself, who appeared to parachute from the helicopter; he piloted this helicopter above the Olympic Stadium. The two parachutists were Mark Sutton (James Bond) and Gary Connery (Queen). A similar helicopter is seen at the end of Skyfall, which he had helped to film the aerial sequences.

== Personal life ==
Wolff has lived in Mougins in south-east France since 2001, with his wife and son and daughter. He lived in Cornwall previously for many years, where his children were born. He met his wife while shooting Symbiosis, a Disney Epcot film.

== Filmography ==
- The Spy Who Loved Me (1977)
- The Empire Strikes Back (1980)
- For Your Eyes Only (1982), opening sequence at Beckton Gas Works on 3 November 1980
- Biggles (1986)
- Cliffhanger (1993)
- Tomorrow Never Dies (1997)
- Black Hawk Down (2001)
- Skyfall (2012)
