= And I Will Kiss =

Song by Underworld featuring Dame Evelyn Glennie

from the album Isles of Wonder: Music for the Opening Ceremony of the London 2012 Olympic Games
- Released: 28 July 2012
- Genre: Electronica, new age
- Length: 17:15
- Label: Decca Music Group
- Songwriters: Rick Smith, Karl Hyde

"And I Will Kiss" is a song written by Rick Smith and Karl Hyde of electronic group Underworld for the Isles of Wonder opening ceremony of the 2012 summer Olympics in London, and the fourth track on the official soundtrack. The title makes reference to a speech given by Caliban in Act 2, Scene 2 of The Tempest by William Shakespeare:

I'll show thee every fertile inch o' the island;
And I will kiss thy foot. I prithee, be my god.

The choice of title was one of several references to The Tempest throughout the ceremony. The track accompanied the Pandemonium section of the ceremony, which depicted the Industrial Revolution in Britain.

== Writing and recording ==
Rick Smith started work on the music "And I Will Kiss" in June 2011. His brief from Danny Boyle, the creative director of the Olympics opening ceremony was simple: "Danny wanted to frighten people. He was certain that by the end [of the Pandemonium section], people had to be going: 'Christ, you can't possibly do that to us for the next three hours.' All the way along, he'd leave you with a sentence like that. That's the kind of direction that leaves you empowered." Smith also said of the track: "There was to be nothing half-hearted or polite about it."

"[For "And I Will Kiss"] the statistics are mind-boggling: 1200 musicians were recorded in dozens of sessions, yielding two dozen Pro Tools projects containing several thousand tracks in total. Three months' work on a 1000-channel desk was needed to condense all this material into a 200+ track mix session, and then to several different stereo and 5.1 mixes. All just to create one 17-minute piece of music. If there was a Guinness Book Of Records entry for World's Largest Recording Session, 'And I Will Kiss' would win hands down."

Groove drum pattern played by the
Pandemonium Drummers

The track was recorded at Abbey Road Studios, apart from the shouts at the start of the track, which were recorded after one of the open-air rehearsals for the ceremony, as Smith recalls: "One night we'd run out of time and it was pouring with rain. We said, Look, can any of you just stay behind for a little while? We need to do some recording. And something like 1500 people stayed behind, getting pissed down on, and shouted for us. Those moments are beyond words." The toll of the Olympic Bell, which also features on the track, was also recorded at night, in the rain and during rehearsals for the ceremony at the stadium; the sound engineers had to ask for the work to stop for half an hour so that they could successfully record it.

The track features performances by percussionist Dame Evelyn Glennie, (with her drum score arranged by Paul Clarvis and Rick Smith); drummers Paul Clarvis, Mike Dolbear, John Randall, Frank Ricotti, Ralph Salmins, Corrina Silvester and Ian Thomas; drum captains Barnaby Archer, Oliver Blake, Daniel Bradley, Rebecca Celebuski, Jason Chowdhury, Jonathan Colgan, Oliver Cox, Fabio de Oliveira, Mike Dolbear, Robert Eckland, Daniel Ellis, Ric Elsworth, David Holmes, Oliver Lowe, Nicola Marangoni, James O’Carroll, Gerard Rundell, Ramon Sherrington, Corrina Silvester, Alex Smith, Owain Williams and Justin Woodward; the 965 Pandemonium Drummers, made up of volunteers. Rick Smith initially had doubts about using amateur drummers, but drum arranger Paul Clarvis convinced him that every one of them was capable of the job in hand. "That was the journey that we took together", Smith said "We can do this, we can be heroes."

The LSO On Track orchestra was conducted by François-Xavier Roth, with assistant conductor Matthew Gibson, and was orchestrated by Geoffrey Alexander. The solo violin was played by Sonia Slany. The brass band was the Grimethorpe Colliery Band orchestrated and conducted by Sandy Smith, and the Nostalgia Steel Band also played on the track.

The singers were Paul Ayres, Will Balkwill, Zoe Brown, Ronan Busfield, Pete Challis, Mark Connell, Emily Dickens, Kevin Doody, Elizabeth Drury, Ewan Gillies, James Hall, Johnny Herford, Katy Hill, Jimmy Holliday, Eloise Irving, Gareth John, Oliver Jones, Christopher Lowrey, Drew Mason, Philippa Murray, Sean Needham, Robyn Allegra Parton, Catherine Pope, Alison Rose, Domhnall Talbot, Reuben Thomas, Matt Thorpe and Amy Wood, and the vocal chanting at the start of the recording was from selected volunteers from the Pandemonium working men and women.

Smith has talked of how the track took months to get right, in a quest to capture the right atmosphere.

== Olympic opening ceremony performance ==
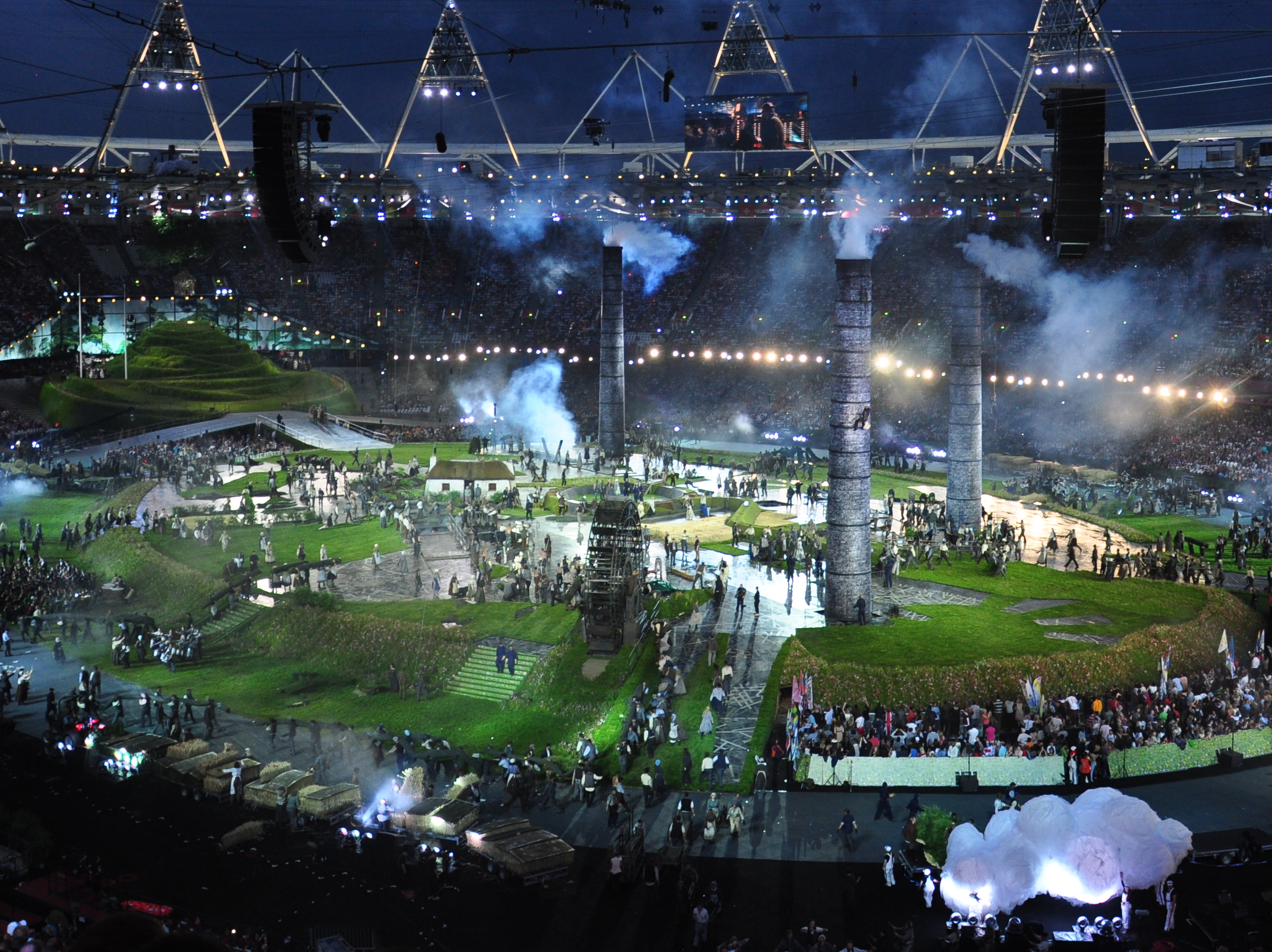
"And I Will Kiss" was the music played during the Pandemonium section of the 2012 summer Olympics opening ceremony, portraying the Industrial Britain.

A slightly shortened version of the track was performed for the first time during the Pandemonium section of the ceremony, representing the Industrial Revolution in Britain, and includes a musical representation of a minute's silence, with whistling, during which time in the ceremony all action stopped and the dead of all wars were remembered. This motif that was whistled was used again at the end of the section as the Olympic rings came together in the sky, and is also featured in "Caliban's Dream", the track that accompanied the lighting of the Olympic cauldron near the end of the ceremony.

The track is featured on the soundtrack of the ceremony, Isles of Wonder. It was digitally released as a downloadable track on iTunes at midnight on 28 July after the ceremony. A slightly modified version, featuring more emphasis on the percussive work from the live performance, features on a compilation entitled "Underworld A Collection 2", released in 2016.

== Reviews ==
The London Evening Standard remarked on "the 17 thrilling, Industrial Revolution-charting minutes of "And I Will Kiss", as thumped out by Dame Evelyn Glennie." The San Francisco Bay Guardian said "At 17 minutes, “And I Will Kiss” provided the backdrop for a shrewdly choreographed performance-art piece, chronicling Britain's historic transition from pastoral wonderland to industrial superpower. Recalling Peter Gabriel’s similarly high-concept OVO: The Millennium Show, held in London 12 years ago, the spectacle combined elaborate set-design and an extensive cast with a loud and pulsating, yet moody and subdued soundtrack. Industrialization represented a sense of forward progress, as well as a loss of innocence, for the British people, and Underworld's musical contribution aptly reflected this emotional complexity." The Guardian called it "17 minutes of gloriously euphoric controlled chaos". Reviewing the album Isles of Wonder, on which the track features, the New Zealand Herald wrote "It's 'And I Will Kiss', which features percussionist Dame Evelyn Glennie's rousing and often breathtaking drum score, that is the highlight of this vast and diverse musical landscape", calling the track "epic" and "Underworld's 17-minute pulsing synth and percussion-driven masterpiece", Q called the track "hair-raising." while NME said it was "a formidable start to an epic show. A stunning piece."
