= Kaos Signing Choir for Deaf and Hearing Children =

English signing choir

- Choir
- Origin: Haringey, North London, England
- Founded: February, 1995; 30 years ago
- Founder: Suzy Davies and Ali Jackson-Wood
- Genre: Signing Choir
- Choir admission: Deaf and hearing young people aged 4 to 18
- Affiliation: The Kaos Organization
- Website: thekaosorganisation.com

The Kaos Signing Choir for Deaf and Hearing Children is a project of The Kaos Organisation, a registered UK charity based in Haringey, London, founded in 1995 by Suzy Davies and Ali Jackson-Wood.

The Kaos Signing Choir for Deaf and Hearing Children is an integrated project for Deaf and hearing children aged 4 to 18. It is the only integrated deaf and hearing children's choir in the UK. The choir regularly performs original Songs Of Kaos, all written by or especially for the group, and the children all sing and sign in British Sign Language.

On 27 July 2012, the choir performed the British national anthem "God Save the Queen" at the Opening Ceremony of the 2012 Olympics at the Olympic Stadium, Olympic Park, London.

The 200 strong choir has also performed for Princess Anne and at venues across London, including the Royal Festival Hall, Royal Albert Hall, The O2, the Barbican Centre, Alexandra Palace and the Drill Hall. They won the Under-18's Choir Class at the North London Festival of Music and Drama in 2005, 2007 and 2008.

In January 2012 Archbishop Desmond Tutu became the Global Patron of The Kaos Organisation. The choir marks Josette Simon as one of its supporters.

On 3 December 2012, the choir, along with the British Paraorchestra, released a cover of "True Colors" as a charity single to support ParalympicsGB, the choir, and the Paraorchestra.
