= Caliban's Dream =

2012 Summer Olympics opening song

Song by Underworld featuring Dockhead Choir, Dame Evelyn Glennie, Only Men Aloud!, Elizabeth Roberts and Alex Trimble

from the album Isles of Wonder: Music for the Opening Ceremony of the London 2012 Olympic Games
- Released: 28 July 2012
- Length: 7:16
- Label: Decca Music Group
- Songwriters: Rick Smith, Karl Hyde, Esme Bronwen-Smith

"Caliban's Dream" is a track written by Rick Smith of electronic group Underworld for the Isles of Wonder (the opening ceremony of the 2012 summer Olympics) in London, and the 14th and final track of the first disc of the official soundtrack.

== Writing and recording ==
Smith told how the brief for the piece was given: "Frank [Cottrell-Boyce, the opening ceremony's writer] and Danny [Boyle, its creative director] put forward beautiful, transcendental poems by people like WH Auden, Thomas Nash, Philip Larkin. They set the tone for Caliban's Dream. Very early on Danny encouraged me not to think in terms of "Eye of the Tiger" for the final stages; we weren't looking for anything testosterone-fuelled. Those poetic ideas that we had talked about initially just seemed so beautiful; we wanted to draw them into the story of the torch. Karl [Hyde, Smith's partner in Underworld] spent a long time working with those words to make them flow, helping avoid all the possible cliches we could fall prey to."

The track features performances by Alex Trimble (lead singer and guitarist of Two Door Cinema Club), percussionist Dame Evelyn Glennie, the Dockhead Choir conducted by Mag Shepherd, Only Men Aloud male voice choir, soprano Elizabeth Roberts, and Esme Bronwen-Smith (co-writer with Rick Smith of the soprano and choral score). Glennie played a newly developed percussion instrument, the Aluphone, on the track.

The orchestra was elements of the London Symphony Orchestra, orchestrated and conducted by Geoffrey Alexander. The singers were Will Balkwill, Zoe Brown, Ronan Busfield, Emily Dickens, Elizabeth Drury, James Hall, Johnny Herford, Katy Hill, Jimmy Holliday, Eloise Irving, Gareth John, Oliver Jones, Christopher Lowrey, Philippa Murray, Robyn Allegra Parton, Catherine Pope, Alison Rose, Domhnall Talbot, Reuben Thomas and Amy Wood. The drums were played by Paul Clarvis, Barnaby Archer, Oliver Blake, Daniel Bradley, Rebecca Celebuski, Jason Chowdhury, Jonathan Colgan, Oliver Cox, Fabio de Oliveira, Mike Dolbear, Robert Eckland, Daniel Ellis, Richard Elsworth, David Holmes, Oliver Lowe, Nicola Marangoni, James O’Carroll, Gerard Rundell, Ramon Sherrington, Corrina Silvester, Alex Smith, Owain Williams and Justin Woodward. The drum score was arranged by Rick Smith and Paul Clarvis.

== Performance at the Olympics ==
"Caliban's Dream" was performed for the first time on 27 July 2012 at the opening ceremony of the Summer Olympics in London, as the Olympic cauldron was lit by the seven young athletes. The title refers to Caliban in The Tempest by William Shakespeare, whose 'Be not afeard' speech Sir Kenneth Branagh, as 19th Century engineer Isambard Kingdom Brunel, had recited earlier in the ceremony - a speech from the play's Act 3, Scene 2, in which Caliban refers to his dreams:

Be not afeard; the isle is full of noises,
Sounds, and sweet airs, that give delight and hurt not.
Sometimes a thousand twangling instruments
Will hum about mine ears; and sometime voices
That, if I then had waked after long sleep,
Will make me sleep again; and then in dreaming,
The clouds methought would open, and show riches
Ready to drop upon me, that when I awaked,
I cried to dream again!

The track reprises the whistling leitmotif first heard during the minute's silence section of "And I Will Kiss", earlier in the ceremony. This time, it is sung by a children's choir, then whistled, then both together. The lyrics for the song were written specifically for the opening ceremony by Underworld’s Rick Smith and sung by Alex Trimble.

Oh,
And the rain tossed about us, in the garden of the world,
But a flame arrives to guide us, cast in gold between the anvils of the stars
Watch you over all your children in the rain, and the streets where I remember,
Where the fire lights are candle souls again.
Affirming flame, hear me call.
Through the darkness, hear it call to us all.
And stir again.
This beating heart, come to care.

Oh,
And the light drive out our fears, And the joy drive out our pain,
And the nations come to greet us, waving open arms like waves of golden corn.
Ever hear us, oh the spirit of the world. May your light be ever near us,
Always lead us from the dark, though we may fall.
We will fly.
And with love, ever call.

At the climax of the track, as the cauldron is lit, a single tuned bell tolls five times. The main riff beneath this section is taken from Underworld's 2002 single "Two Months Off". The track ends with a lone unaccompanied soprano singing as the parts of the cauldron rise, assembling itself into a whole and burns brightly.

== Release and chart performance ==
The track is featured on the soundtrack of the ceremony, Isles of Wonder. It was digitally released as a downloadable track on iTunes at midnight on 27 July after the ceremony. It was the highest placed track from the soundtrack on iTunes in the UK, reaching no. 5 when the charts were announced on 29 July. On 5 August, it entered the main charts at number 12, making it Underworld's first UK Top 20 Hit since "Two Months Off" in 2002 and their first to chart in the UK Top 40 Chart since their remix of "Born Slippy .NUXX" in 2003.

== Reviews ==
The London Evening Standard called the track "hypnotic".

== Charts ==
Chart (2012)	Peak position
Ireland (IRMA)	38
UK Singles (Official Charts)	12
