= 2012 Summer Olympics opening ceremony =

- Part of 2012 Summer Olympics
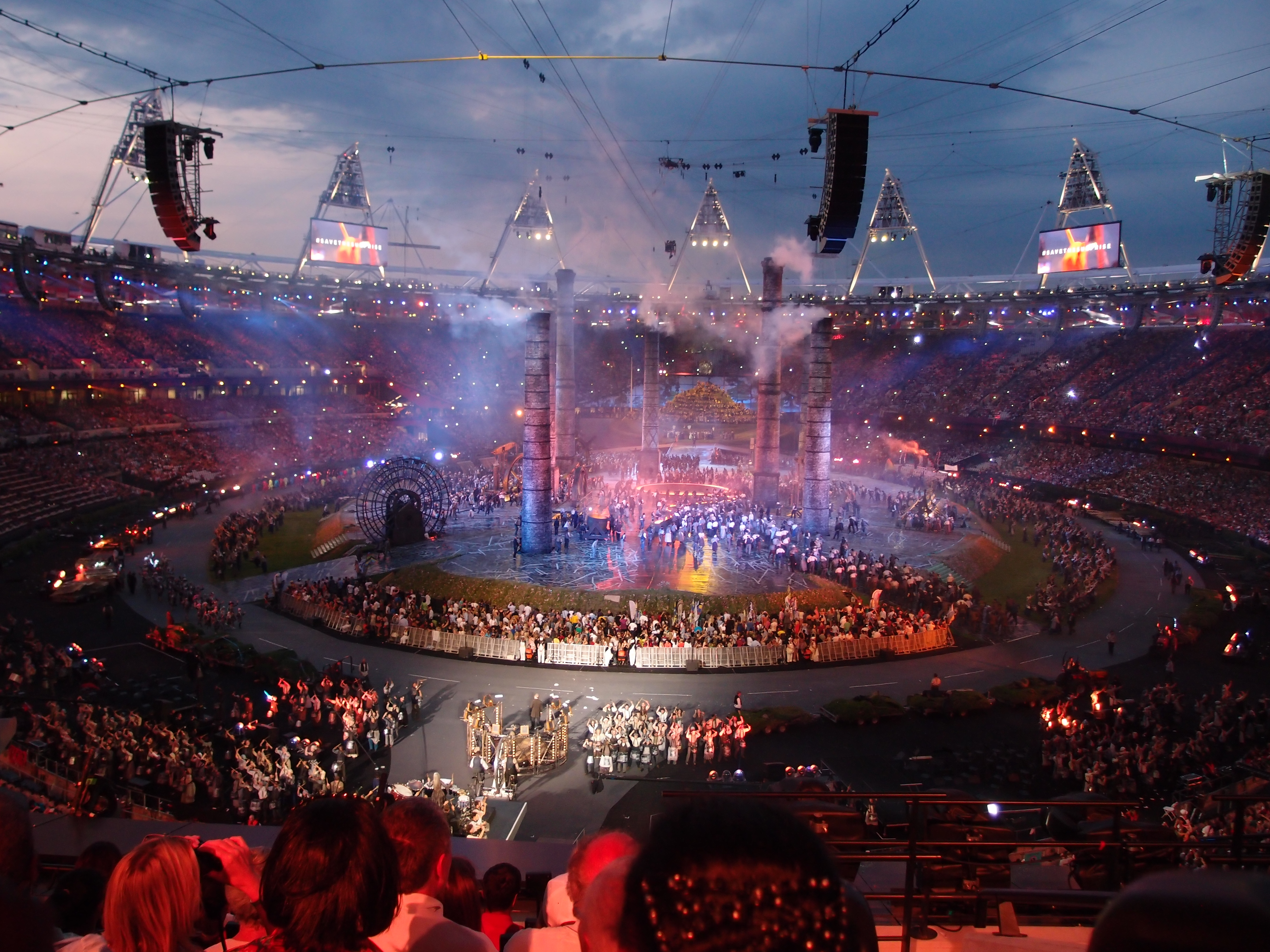
- The "Pandemonium" segment, during the final rehearsal of the ceremony on 25 July
- Date: 27 July 2012; 14 years ago
- Time: 21:00 – 00:46 BST (UTC+1)
- Venue: Olympic Stadium
- Location: London, United Kingdom; 51°32′19″N 0°01′00″W
- Also known as: Isles of Wonder
- Filmed by: BBC; Olympic Broadcasting Services (OBS); Done and Dusted
- Footage: The ceremony on the IOC YouTube channel on YouTube

The opening ceremony of the 2012 Summer Olympics took place on the evening of Friday 27 July 2012 in the Olympic Stadium, London, during which the Games were formally opened by Queen Elizabeth II. As mandated by the Olympic Charter, the proceedings combined the ceremonial opening of this international sporting event (including welcoming speeches, hoisting of the flags and the parade of athletes) with an artistic spectacle to showcase the host nation's culture. The spectacle was entitled Isles of Wonder and directed by the Academy Award-winning British film director Danny Boyle, with Paulette Randall as associate director.

Prior to London 2012, there had been considerable apprehension about Britain's ability to stage an opening ceremony that could reach the standard set at the Beijing Summer Games of 2008. The 2008 ceremony had been noted for its scale, extravagance and expense, hailed as the "greatest ever", and had cost £65m. In contrast, London spent an estimated £27m (out of £80m budgeted for its four ceremonies), which was nevertheless about twice the original budget. Nonetheless, the London opening ceremony was immediately seen as a tremendous success, widely praised as a "masterpiece" and "a love letter to Britain".

The ceremony began at 21:00 BST and lasted almost four hours. It was watched by an estimated worldwide television audience of 900 million, falling short of the IOC's 1.5 billion viewership estimate for the 2008 ceremony, but becoming the most viewed in the UK and US. The content had largely been kept secret before the performance, despite involving thousands of volunteers and two public rehearsals. The principal sections of the artistic display represented Britain's Industrial Revolution, National Health Service, literary heritage, popular music and culture, and were noted for their vibrant storytelling and use of music. Two shorter sections drew particular comment, involving a filmed cameo appearance of the Queen with James Bond as her escort, and a live performance by the London Symphony Orchestra joined by comedian Rowan Atkinson. These were widely ascribed to Britain's sense of humour. The ceremony featured children and young people in most of its segments, reflecting the "inspire a generation" aspiration of London's original bid for the Games.

The BBC released footage of the entire opening ceremony on 29 October 2012, edited by Danny Boyle and with background extras, along with more than seven hours of sporting highlights and the complete closing ceremony.

== Preparations ==
The London Organising Committee of the Olympic and Paralympic Games (LOCOG) approached Danny Boyle to be the director of the ceremony in June 2010, and he immediately accepted. Boyle explained that there had been four things that made him take the job: he was a big Olympics fan, he lived a mile from the Stadium and so felt invested in the area, his late father's birthday was on the ceremony's date, and he felt his "Oscar clout" would enable him to push through what he wanted to do. He said it "felt weirdly more like a ... civic or national responsibility" to take the job.

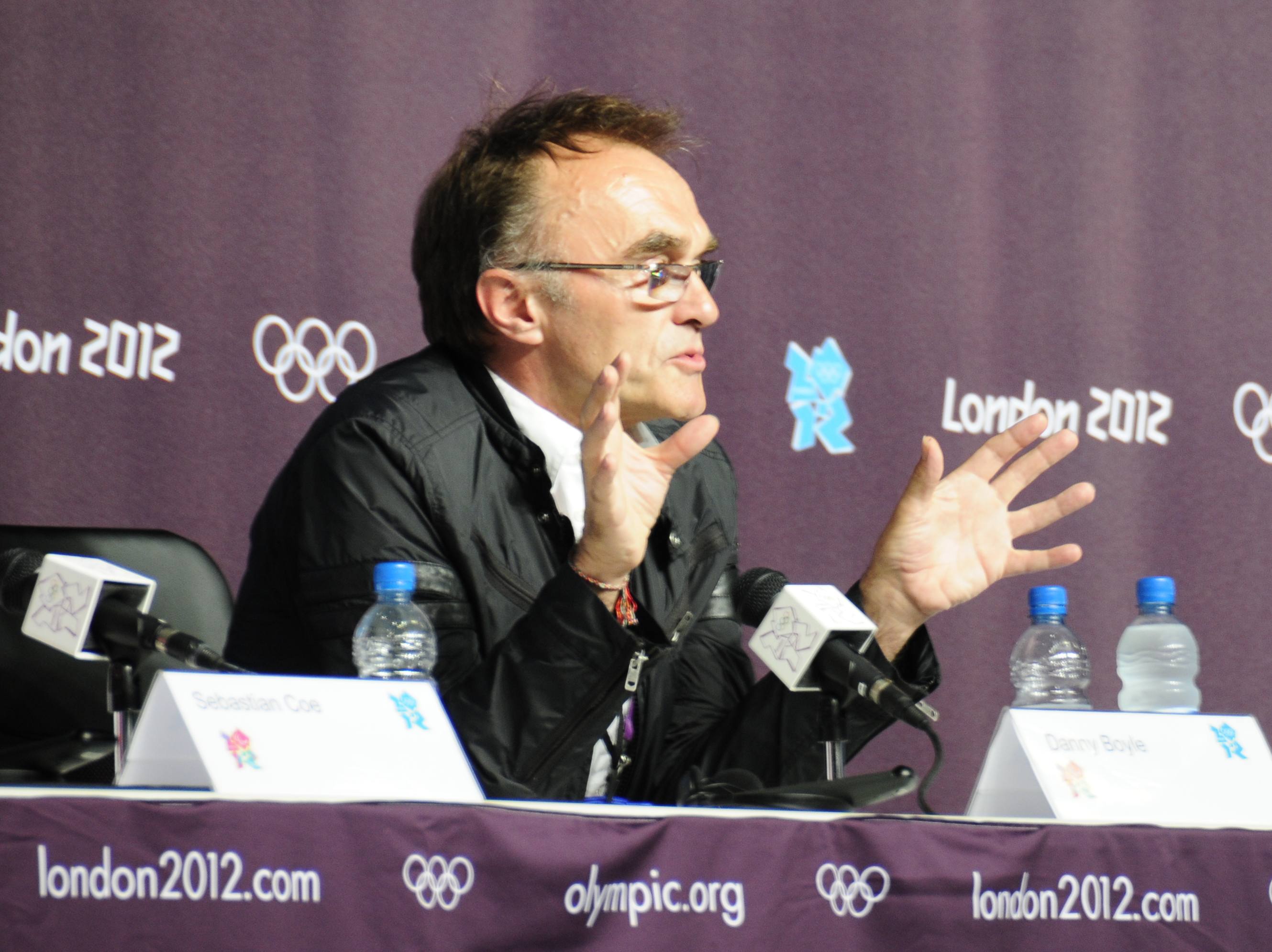
Danny Boyle, the director of the opening ceremony

Boyle acknowledged that the extravagance of the 2008 opening ceremony was an impossible act to follow — "you can't get bigger than Beijing" — and that this realisation had in fact liberated his team creatively. He said "..obviously I'm not going to try and build on Beijing, because how could you? We can't, and you wouldn't want to, so we're going back to the beginning. We're going to try and give the impression that we're rethinking and restarting, because they've (opening ceremonies) escalated since Los Angeles in 1984. They've tried to top themselves each time and you can't do that after Beijing." Beijing's budget had been £65m, whereas London's final budget was £27m, which was twice the original provision. The London stadium had the same number of seats as Beijing's, but was half the size; this intimacy of scale meant that Boyle felt he could achieve something personal and connecting.

The different sections of the ceremony were designed to reflect aspects of British history and culture, with the title Isles of Wonder partly inspired by Shakespeare's play The Tempest (particularly Caliban's 'Be not afeard' speech), and partly by the G. K. Chesterton aphorism: "The world shall perish not for lack of wonders, but for lack of wonder."

In July 2010, Boyle started brainstorming ideas with designer Mark Tildesley, writer Frank Cottrell-Boyce and costume designer Suttirat Anne Larlarb. They considered "what was essentially British", with the non-British Larlarb able to offer a view of what the world thought Britain meant. Cottrell-Boyce had given Boyle a copy of Pandaemonium, (named after the capital of Hell in Paradise Lost) by Humphrey Jennings, which collated contemporary reports from the Industrial Revolution. It had become traditional during the opening ceremony to "produce" the Olympic rings in a spectacular manner. Cottrell-Boyce commented: "Danny had a very clear idea that in the first 15 minutes you had to have a great, startling image that could go around the world; it had to climax with something that made people go 'Oh my God!'" Boyle decided that "the journey from the pastoral to the industrial, ending with the forging of the Olympic rings" would be that image.

The ten distinct chapters on which the team started work were gradually compressed into three principal movements: the violent transition from "Green and Pleasant Land" to the "Pandemonium" of industrial revolution, a salute to the NHS and children's literature, and a celebration of pop culture, technology and the digital revolution.

"At some point in their histories, most nations experience a revolution that changes everything about them. The United Kingdom had a revolution that changed the whole of human existence.

In 1709 Abraham Darby smelted iron in a blast furnace, using coke. And so began the Industrial Revolution. Out of Abraham's Shropshire furnace flowed molten metal. Out of his genius flowed the mills, looms, engines, weapons, railways, ships, cities, conflicts and prosperity that built the world we live in.

In November 1990 another Briton sparked another revolution – equally far-reaching – a revolution we're still experiencing. The digital revolution was sparked by Tim Berners-Lee's amazing gift to the world – the World Wide Web. This, he said, is for everyone.

We welcome you to an Olympic Opening Ceremony for everyone. A ceremony that celebrates the creativity, eccentricity, daring and openness of the British genius by harnessing the genius, creativity, eccentricity, daring and openness of modern London.

You'll hear the words of our great poets – Shakespeare, Blake and Milton. You'll hear the glorious noise of our unrivalled pop culture. You'll see characters from our great children's literature – Peter Pan and Captain Hook, Mary Poppins, Voldemort, Cruella de Vil. You'll see ordinary families and extraordinary athletes. Dancing nurses, singing children and amazing special effects.

But we hope, too, that through all the noise and excitement that you will glimpse a single golden thread of purpose – the idea of Jerusalem – of a better world, the world of real freedom and true equality, a world that can be built through the prosperity of industry, through the caring nation that built the welfare state, through the joyous energy of popular culture, through the dream of universal communication. A belief that we can build Jerusalem. And that it will be for everyone."

— Danny Boyle, in the ceremony programme.

When Boyle returned to work on the ceremony in the spring of 2011 he asked Rick Smith of Underworld, with whom he had worked on several film projects as well as his theatrical production of Mary Shelley's Frankenstein, to be the musical director. At the same time the team moved to the Three Mills studio complex in east London, where a 4x4 metre scale model of the stadium was built. For security reasons, a single CGI-assisted version of the ceremony was kept on editor Sascha Dhillon's laptop; anyone needing it had to come to the studio.

The cast included professional performers and 7,500 volunteers. Boyle considered the volunteers to be "the most valuable commodity of all". In November 2011 they auditioned at Three Mills, and rehearsals began in earnest in spring 2012 at an open-air site at Dagenham (the abandoned Ford plant), often in foul weather. Although key contributors had to sign non-disclosure agreements and some elements were codenamed, Boyle placed immense trust in the volunteers by asking them simply to "save the surprise" and not leak any information. Further volunteers were recruited to help with security and marshalling, and to support the technical crew. Three weeks before the ceremony, Mark Rylance, who was to have taken a leading part, pulled out after a family bereavement and was replaced by Kenneth Branagh.

The Olympic Bell, the largest harmonically tuned bell in the world, weighing 23 tonnes, had been cast in brass under the direction of the Whitechapel Bell Foundry by Royal Eijsbouts of the Netherlands, and hung in the Stadium. It was inscribed with a line from Caliban's speech in The Tempest: "Be not afeard, the isle is full of noises".

Boyle gave significant emphasis to the London 2012 theme "inspire a generation" and devised a programme relying heavily on children and young people, and built around themes that would relate to the young. Twenty-five schools in the six original East London host boroughs were used to recruit child volunteers for the performance, and 170 sixth formers (16–18-year-olds), between them speaking more than 50 languages, were recruited from their colleges.

On 12 June 2012, at a press conference, Boyle had promised a huge set of rural Britain, which was to include a village cricket team, farm animals, a model of Glastonbury Tor, as well as a maypole and a rain-producing cloud. His intention was to represent the rural and urban landscape of Britain. The design was to include a mosh pit at each end of the set, one with people celebrating a rock festival and the other the Last Night of the Proms.

Boyle promised a ceremony with which everyone would feel involved; he said, "I hope it will reveal how peculiar and contrary we are – and how there's also, I hope, a warmth about us." Some of the set was designed with real grass turf and soil. The use of animals (40 sheep, 12 horses, 3 cows, 2 goats, 10 chickens, 10 ducks, 9 geese and 3 sheep dogs, looked after by 34 animal handlers) drew some criticism from People for the Ethical Treatment of Animals (PETA). Boyle, who was being advised by the RSPCA, assured PETA that the animals would be well cared for. After the press conference, much commentary in the UK Press was negative and attracted "hundreds of comments online completely supporting...the view that the opening ceremony would be a disaster."

The overwhelming majority of the music used was British. The team worked next door to the office of the musical director for the closing ceremony, David Arnold, and so hearing each other's music there was a scramble to claim a particular song first. A.R. Rahman, who worked with Boyle on Slumdog Millionaire and 127 Hours, composed a Punjabi song "Nimma Nimma" to showcase Indian influence in the UK, according to Boyle's wishes. More Indian music was also scheduled for inclusion in the medley including a Tamil song from the 1989 Bollywood film Ram Lakhan titled "Naanthaan Ungappanda". Paul McCartney was to be the ceremony's closing act.

Sebastian Coe was instrumental in asking the Queen to take part, responding positively when Boyle first pitched the Happy and Glorious film sequence featuring the Queen. Boyle suggested that the Queen be played either by a lookalike, or by a world-class actress such as Helen Mirren, in a location to double as Buckingham Palace. Coe asked Princess Anne, a British member of the IOC and LOCOG, what she thought, and she told him to ask the Queen. Coe presented the idea to the Queen's Deputy Private Secretary. Boyle was surprised to hear that the Queen would be happy to play herself, and wanted a speaking part. Filming took place in late March 2012, and Happy and Glorious was produced by the BBC, as was the opening film sequence Journey along the Thames.

Changes were still being made to the programme in the final days before the ceremony: a BMX bike section was dropped due to time constraints, and the "Pandemonium" and "Thanks..Tim" sections were edited down. In 2016 Boyle recounted how he had come under pressure from Jeremy Hunt, then the Olympics and Culture Secretary, to cut back the NHS section, which he had saved only by threatening to resign and take the volunteers with him.

Two full dress and technical rehearsals took place in the Olympic stadium, on 23 and 25 July, in front of an audience of 60,000 comprising volunteers, cast members' families, competition winners, and others connected to the Games. Boyle asked them not to "spoil the surprise" by using the hashtag #savethesurprise on social media, keeping the performance a secret for the hundreds of millions who would watch on the Friday night.

== Officials and guests ==
=== Royal Box ===
Seated in the Royal Box were the Queen and the Duke of Edinburgh, the Prince of Wales, and other members of the British royal family. They were accompanied by Archbishop of Canterbury Rowan Williams, Prime Minister David Cameron, Spouse of the Prime Minister Samantha Cameron, former Prime Ministers John Major, Tony Blair and Gordon Brown and Mayor of London Boris Johnson. Officials of the Olympic movement included President of the IOC Jacques Rogge, LOCOG Chairman Sebastian Coe and members of the IOC.

=== International dignitaries ===
The ceremony was the largest gathering of world leaders for an Olympic and sporting event in history, surpassing that of 2008. Three multilateral leaders, more than ninety-five heads of state and government and representatives from five organisations and one hundred and twenty countries attended.

== Proceedings ==
=== Schedule ===
Time (BST)	Section title
27 July 2012
21:00–21:04	Countdown
21:04–21:09	Green and Pleasant Land
21:09–21:25	Pandemonium
21:25–21:35	Happy and Glorious
21:35–21:47	Second to the right, and straight on till morning
21:47–21:52	Interlude
21:52–22:09	Frankie and June say...thanks Tim
22:09–22:20	Abide with Me
22:20–00:00	Welcome
28 July 2012
00:00–00:07	Bike a.m.
00:07–00:24	Let the Games Begin
00:24–00:38	There Is a Light That Never Goes Out
00:38–00:46	And in the end

=== Prologue ===
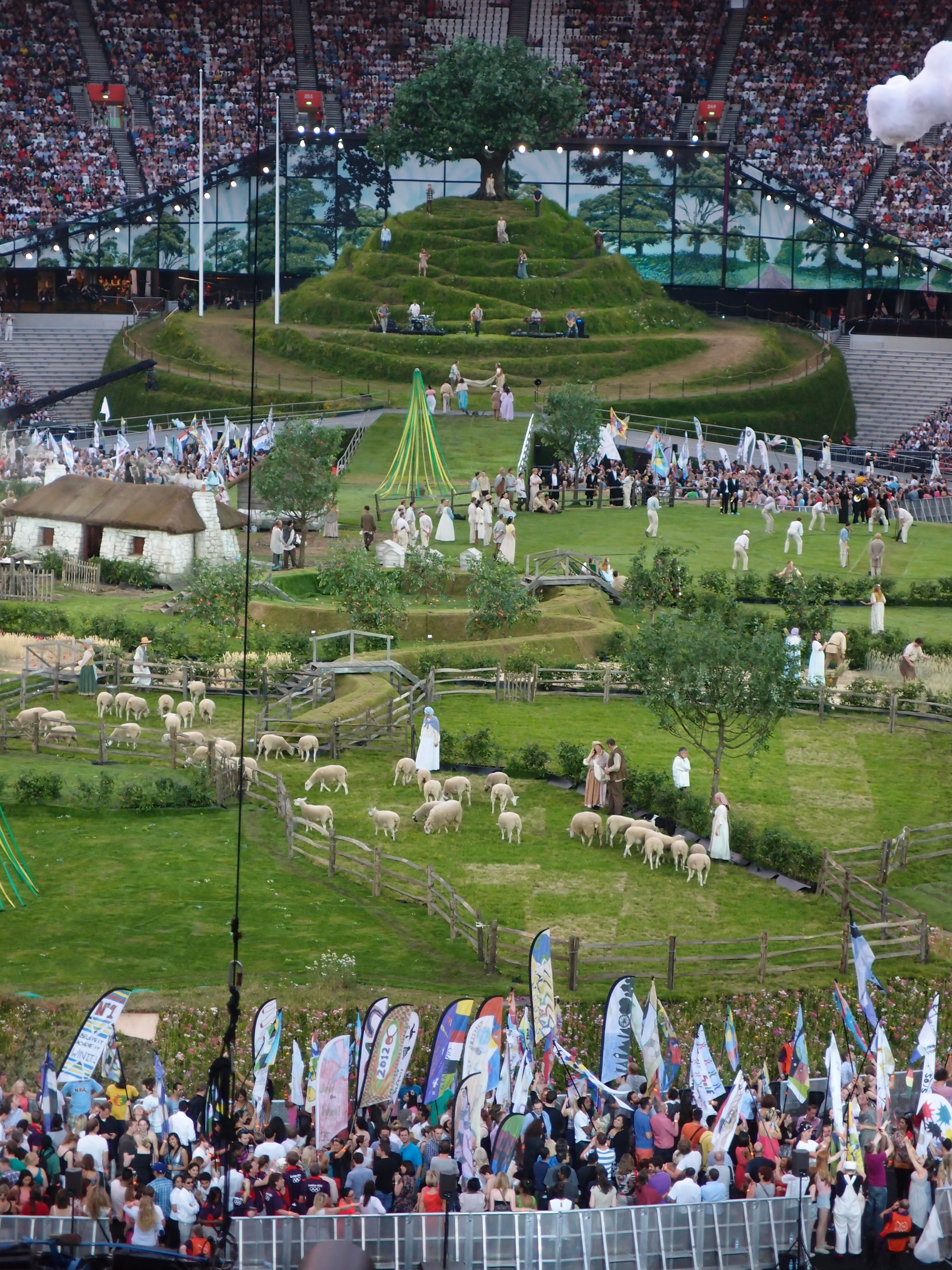
Scene before the ceremony commenced, representing rural Britain

At exactly 20:12 BST, the Red Arrows performed a flypast over the Olympic Stadium and then over the concert in Hyde Park. This concert featured artists selected to represent the four nations of the United Kingdom: Duran Duran, Stereophonics, Snow Patrol and Paolo Nutini.

At the beginning the stadium contained a rural scene including the model of Glastonbury Tor, a model village and a water wheel, replete with live animals (removed shortly before the ceremony began), and actors portraying working villagers, football and cricket players.

Frank Turner performed three songs ("Sailor's Boots", "Wessex Boy" and "I Still Believe") on the model of Glastonbury Tor, joined by Emily Barker, Ben Marwood and Jim Lockey, as well as his regular backing band the Sleeping Souls. LSO On Track (an orchestra of 80 young musicians from 10 East London boroughs together with 20 LSO members) then performed Edward Elgar's "Nimrod" from the Enigma Variations, accompanied by extracts from the BBC Radio Shipping Forecast, and maritime images on the big screens, while the audience held up blue sheeting to simulate the sight of the ocean. This performance celebrated Britain's maritime heritage and geographical insularity.

=== Countdown (21:00–21:04 BST) ===
The ceremony began at 21:00 after a one-minute "60 to 1" countdown film made up of shots of numbers, such as those on house doors, street nameplates, London buses, station platforms and market labels. The number 39 is seen at the foot of a flight of steps, a reference to John Buchan's novel The Thirty-Nine Steps, while the 10 is the door number from 10 Downing Street.

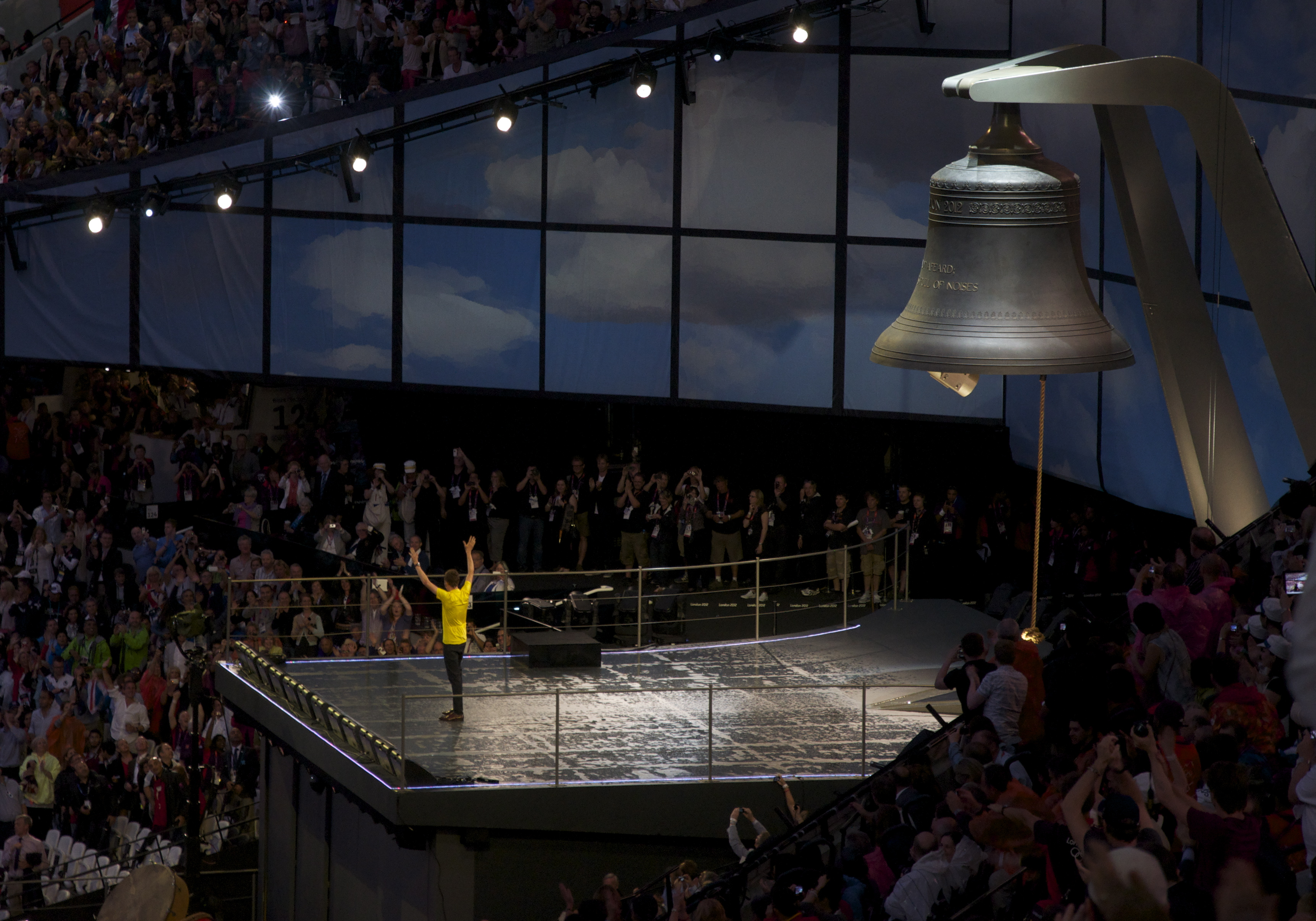
The 2012 Tour de France winner Bradley Wiggins opening the ceremony

A two-minute film, Journey along the Thames, directed by Boyle and produced by the BBC, opened the ceremony. To the sound of "Surf Solar" by Fuck Buttons, it followed the River Thames from its source to the heart of London, juxtaposing images of contemporary British life with pastoral shots and flashes of scenes from the stadium. The characters Ratty, Mole and Toad from The Wind in the Willows were briefly seen, as was a "Monty Python hand" pointing towards London on umbrellas, an InterCity 125 train passing the Olympic rings as crop circles in a field, and a rowing race (to the tune of the "Eton Boating Song").

At Battersea Power Station a Pink Floyd pig was flying between the towers; the clock sound from another Pink Floyd song "Time" was heard passing Big Ben. The soundtrack included clips from the theme tune of The South Bank Show, "Caprice No. 24" (as composed by Andrew Lloyd Webber in his Variations fusion album), and the Sex Pistols' "God Save the Queen" as the film followed the route of the band's cruise down the River Thames during the Silver Jubilee.

After lifting to an aerial view of East London mirroring the title sequence of the BBC soap opera EastEnders, to the sound of the drum beats from the closing theme, the film flashed down through the Thames Barrier. The view progressed into Bow Creek, and then below surface through a London Underground train and station, including historic footage of Isambard Kingdom Brunel's Thames Tunnel, and through the Rotherhithe Tunnel, accompanied by clips of an orchestral rendition of Elgar's Pomp and Circumstance Marches, "London Calling" by The Clash, the London Underground's Mind the Gap public address warning, and "Smile" by Lily Allen. It then switched to a sequence filmed outside the stadium shortly before the ceremony, superimposed with posters from previous Summer Olympics (all of them except 1900 Paris, 1936 Berlin, 1984 Los Angeles, and 1996 Atlanta), to a recording of "Map of the Problematique" by Muse. This ended with a live shot of three cast members holding the posters for the 2012 competition.

There was then a ten-second countdown in the stadium, with children holding clusters of balloons that burst simultaneously, with the audience shouting out the numbers. Bradley Wiggins, who had won the Tour de France five days earlier, opened the ceremony by ringing the Olympic Bell that hung at one end of the stadium. Four upper-atmosphere balloons were released, each expected to carry a set of Olympic rings and a camera up to the mid-stratosphere.

=== Green and Pleasant Land (21:04–21:09) ===
"Be not afeard" speech

Be not afeard: the isle is full of noises,
Sounds, and sweet airs, that give delight, and hurt not.
Sometimes a thousand twangling instruments
Will hum about mine ears; and sometimes voices,
That, if I then had wak'd after long sleep,
Will make me sleep again: and then, in dreaming,
The clouds methought would open and show riches
Ready to drop upon me; that, when I wak'd,
I cried to dream again.

— William Shakespeare, The Tempest, Act 3, Scene II

The depiction of rural life already in the arena was billed as "a reminder and a promise of a once and future better life". Youth choirs began a cappella performances of the informal anthems of the four nations of the UK: "Jerusalem" (for England, sung by a live choir in the stadium), "Danny Boy" (from the Giant's Causeway in Northern Ireland), "Flower of Scotland" (from Edinburgh Castle in Scotland), and "Bread of Heaven" (from Rhossili Beach in Wales). These were inter-cut with footage of notable Rugby Union Home Nations' tries, England's winning drop goal from the 2003 Rugby World Cup Final, and live shots from the stadium.

As the last choir performance concluded, vintage London General Omnibus Company stagecoaches entered, carrying businessmen and early industrialists in Victorian dress and top hats, led by Kenneth Branagh as Isambard Kingdom Brunel. The 50 men stepped down from the carriages and surveyed the land approvingly. After walking onto the Glastonbury Tor, Brunel delivered Caliban's "Be not afeard" speech, reflecting Boyle's introduction to the ceremony in the programme and signifying an aspiration of new industry or a new era in Britain. This anticipated the next section of the ceremony.

=== Pandemonium (21:09–21:25) ===
This section encapsulated British economic and social development from rural economy through the Industrial Revolution to the 1960s.

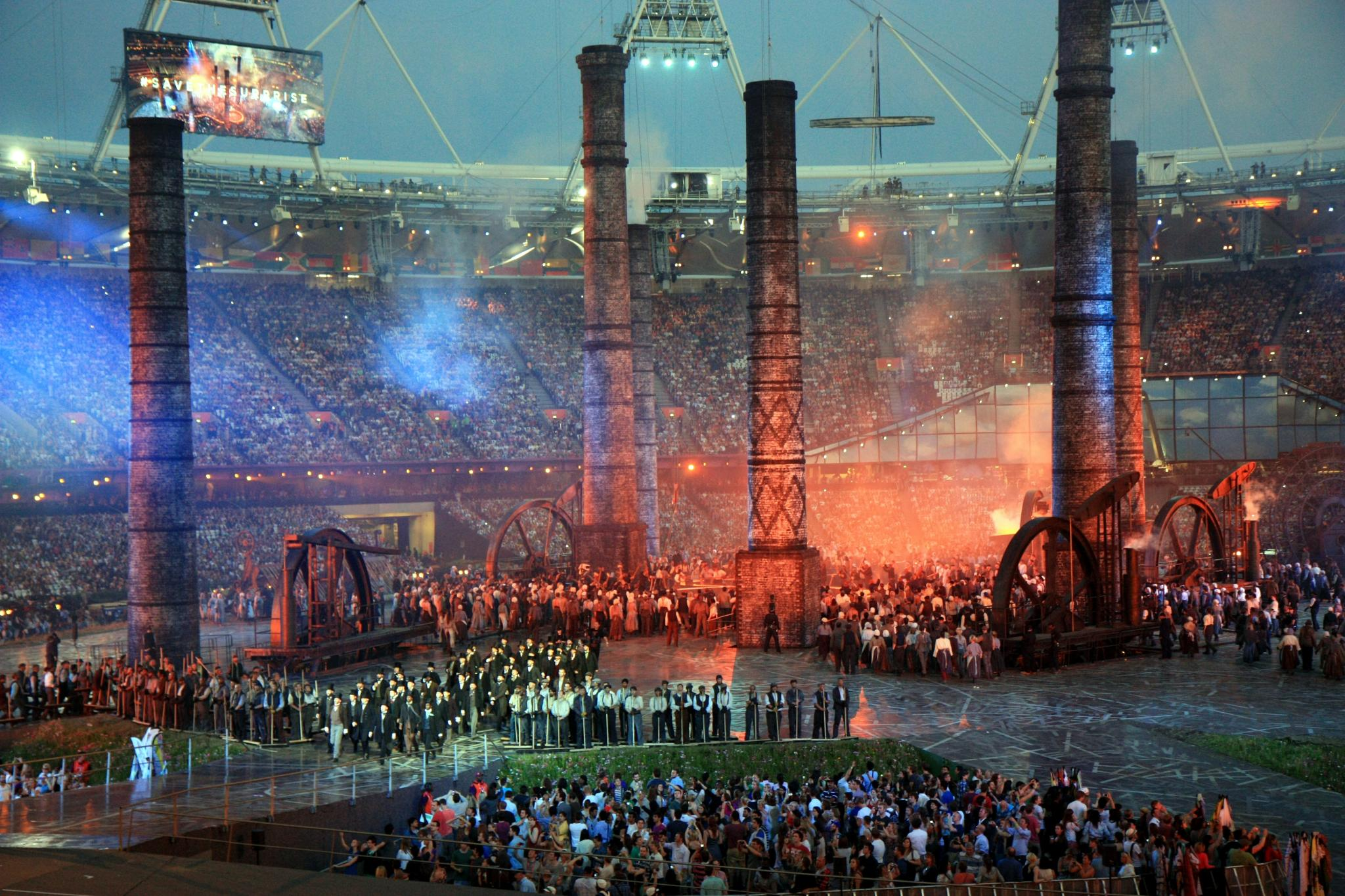
Scene representing Industrial Britain. Rehearsal 23 July 2012 before the ceremony four days later.

Proceedings were suddenly interrupted by a loud shout, recorded by volunteers during the rehearsals, followed by drumming (the pre-recorded drumming amplified by 965 cast members drumming on inverted household buckets and bins), led by Evelyn Glennie. The three-tonne oak tree on top of the Glastonbury Tor lifted, and industrial workers emerged from both the Tor's brightly lit interior and the entrances to the stadium, to swell the cast to a total of 2,500 volunteers. So began what Boyle had called the "biggest scene change in theatre history" and something he had been advised against attempting. Underworld's "And I Will Kiss" began to play, as the cast rolled away the grass and other rural props.

Seven smoking chimney stacks with accompanying steeplejacks rose from the ground, along with other industrial machinery: five beam engines, six looms, a crucible and a water wheel (one of the few items left from the rural scene). Boyle said that this section celebrated the "tremendous potential" afforded by the advancements of the Victorian era. It also included a minute's silence in remembrance of the loss of life of both world wars, featuring British "Tommies" and shots of poppies, during which the names of the Accrington Pals were shown on the stadium screens. Unprompted, members of the audience stood in respect during this segment.

Volunteers paraded around the stadium representing some of the groups that had changed the face of Britain: the woman's suffrage movement, the Jarrow Crusade, the first Caribbean immigrants arriving in 1948 on board the Empire Windrush, a 1970s DJ float, the Nostalgia Steel Band, and the Beatles as they appeared on the cover of Sgt. Pepper's Lonely Hearts Club Band. Also included were real-life Chelsea Pensioners, the Grimethorpe Colliery Band, and a group of Pearly Kings and Queens.

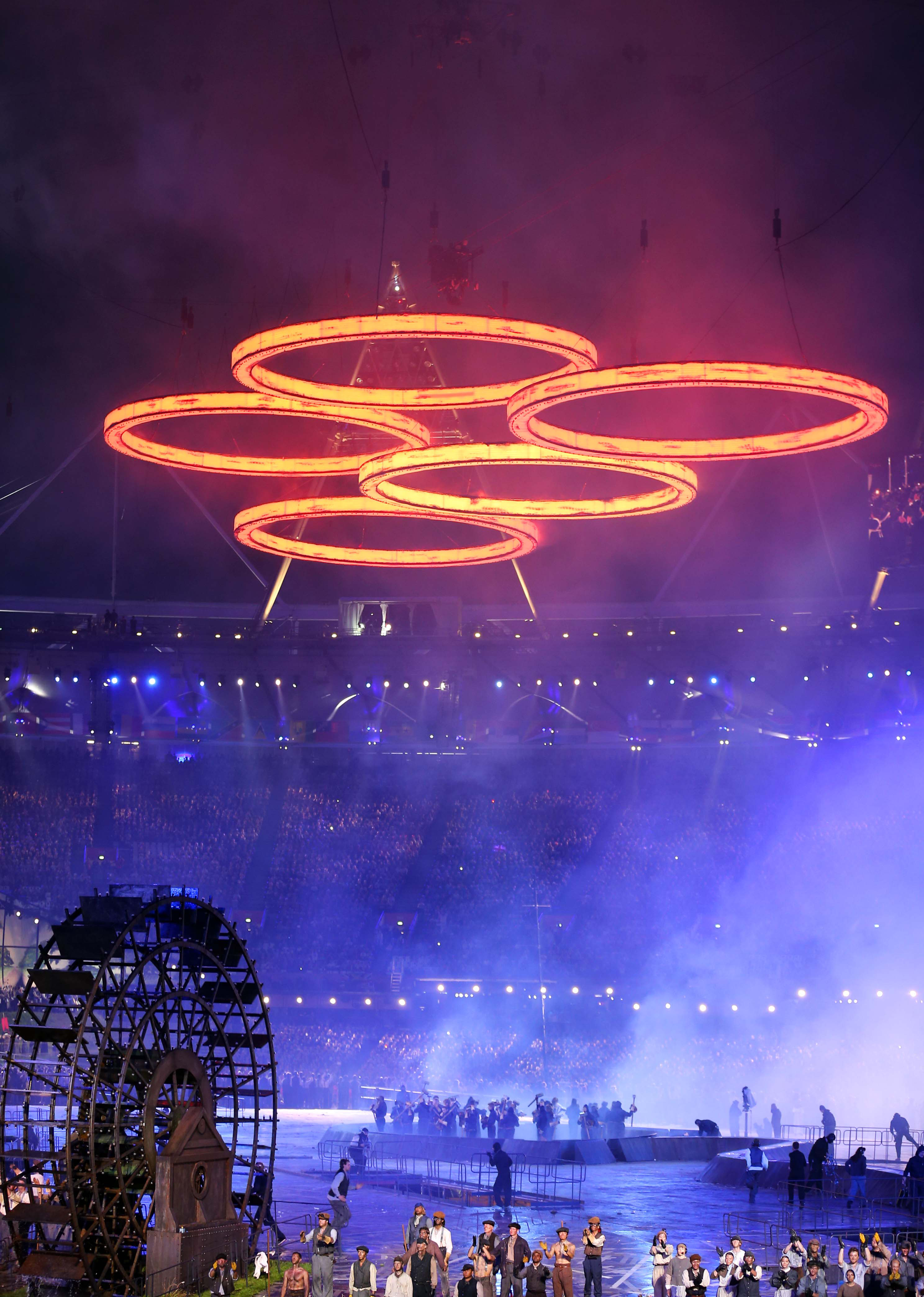
The Olympic rings

Workers began casting an iron ring. As the noise level and tension built, driven by the relentless rhythm of the music and the drumming, participants mimed repetitive mechanical movements associated with industrial processes such as weaving. Four glowing orange rings gradually began to be carried high above the stadium toward its centre on overhead wires, and then the ring seemingly being cast and forged in the arena began to rise. The five rings converged, still glowing and accompanied by steam and firework effects to give the impression that they were of hot metal. When the five rings formed the Olympic symbol above the stadium, they ignited and rained fire in silver and gold. The image of the Olympic rings in flame became the iconic image of the ceremony, reproduced in newspapers and web stories around the world.

=== Happy and Glorious (21:25–21:35) ===
A short film directed by Boyle and produced by the BBC, called Happy and Glorious (after a line in the national anthem), featured the character James Bond, played by then-Bond actor Daniel Craig, entering the front gate of Buckingham Palace in a London black cab. His entrance (accompanied by an arrangement of Handel's "Arrival of the Queen of Sheba") is noticed by Brazilian children (a nod to Rio de Janeiro, which was to be the next summer Games host city) in the throne room. Bond meets Elizabeth II (who played herself, acknowledging Bond with the words, "Good evening, Mr Bond") in her audience room at the palace, walks with her out of the building and into a waiting AgustaWestland AW139 helicopter. The film followed the helicopter across London, with shots of a cheering crowd on The Mall, Nelson's Column, the Palace of Westminster with an animated Winston Churchill statue in Parliament Square, and of the Thames past the London Eye, St Paul's Cathedral, the financial district City of London.

The helicopter then passed through Tower Bridge, accompanied by the Dambusters March. The film finished with Bond and the Queen apparently jumping from a real helicopter live above the stadium, accompanied by the "James Bond Theme". The Queen and the Duke of Edinburgh, along with Rogge, were then introduced to the audience. The Queen was wearing the same dress as in the film, as if she had just arrived with Bond.

The idea of the royal helicopter jump was first pitched by director Danny Boyle to Sebastian Coe, who loved it so much he took it to Edward Young, Private Secretary to the Queen, at Buckingham Palace in the summer of 2011. Young "listened sagely, laughed, and promised to ask the boss". Word came back to Coe that the Queen would love to take part. Young, Boyle and Coe agreed to keep the plan secret so as not to spoil the surprise. On 19 September 2022, the morning of the Queen's funeral, Coe told BBC News he originally took the concept to Princess Anne whose only question was "What kind of helicopter?" Back in 2014, during a State visit by Irish President Michael Higgins, the Queen herself had credited the humour in some degree to Boyle's Irish heritage, saying, “It took someone of Irish descent, Danny Boyle, to get me to jump from a helicopter."

For the scenes with the helicopter, the Queen was doubled by actress Julia McKenzie, and for the parachute jump by BASE jumper and stuntman Gary Connery wearing a dress, hat, jewellery and with a handbag. Bond was played by Mark Sutton. The helicopter had flown to the stadium from Stapleford Aerodrome in Essex, piloted by Marc Wolff.

The Union Flag was then raised by members of the British Armed Forces, while the first and third verses of the national anthem were performed a cappella by the Kaos Signing Choir for Deaf and Hearing Children.

=== Second to the right, and straight on till morning (21:35–21:47) ===
The first part of this sequence celebrated the National Health Service ("the institution which more than any other unites our nation", according to the programme), which had been founded in the year of the previous London Games in 1948. Music was by Mike Oldfield. Six hundred dancers, some of whom were NHS staff, along with 1,200 volunteers, some recruited from British hospitals, entered along with children on 320 hospital beds, some of which functioned as trampolines. They started a short jive routine. Watching from the tor were specially invited hospital staff and nine child patients from Great Ormond Street Hospital. The blankets on the beds illuminated and the beds were arranged to depict a child's face with a smile and a tear (the Hospital Children's Charity's logo). The acronym "GOSH" then changed into the initials "NHS", turning into the shape of a crescent moon as the children were hushed to sleep and read books by the nurses.

The sequence then moved on to celebrate British children's literature. J. K. Rowling began by reading from J. M. Barrie's Peter Pan (whose copyright was given to Great Ormond Street Hospital). The Child Catcher appeared amongst the children, followed by giant puppet representations of villains from British children's literature: the Queen of Hearts, Captain Hook, Cruella de Vil, and Lord Voldemort. Minutes later, 32 women playing Mary Poppins descended with their umbrellas, as the villains deflated and the actors resumed dancing. The music for this sequence included partially rearranged sections from Tubular Bells (with a giant set of tubular bells at the rear of the stage), Tubular Bells III and, after the villains had been driven away by the Mary Poppins characters, In Dulci Jubilo. During this performance the children in pyjamas jumped up and down on their brightly lit beds, creating a memorable image amid the darkness of the stadium.

The sequence concluded with a pale, gigantic baby's head, with a rippling sheet for its body, in the centre of the arena. This celebrated the Scottish pioneers of obstetric ultrasound imaging.

=== Interlude (21:47–21:52) ===
Simon Rattle was then introduced to conduct the London Symphony Orchestra in a performance of Vangelis's "Chariots of Fire", as a tribute to the British film industry with Rowan Atkinson reprising his role as Mr. Bean, comically playing a repeated note on a synthesiser. He then lapsed into a filmed dream sequence in which he joined the runners from the film Chariots of Fire, beating them in their iconic run along West Sands at St Andrews by riding in a car, rejoining the race and tripping the front runner. Danny Boyle later said: "It wasn't actually Mr. Bean. Strictly speaking, the name of his character was Derek." In 2021's Happy Birthday Mr Bean documentary, Atkinson also stated that the performance was not actually intended to be the character Mr. Bean.

=== Frankie and June say...thanks Tim (21:52–22:09) ===
This sequence celebrated British popular music and culture, paying homage to each decade since the 1960s. To the accompaniment of the BBC newsreel theme "Girls in Grey" and the theme tune from The Archers, a young mother and son arrive in a Mini Cooper at a full-size replica of a modern British house. The 1987 "don't worry about a hurricane" weather forecast by Michael Fish was shown on the big screens as rain suddenly poured on the house, followed by "Push the Button", by Sugababes. In the centre of the arena the sides of another house, three times larger, were used as screens to show clips from various TV programmes, music videos and films, including A Matter of Life and Death (June is named for its protagonist), as well as Gregory's Girl, Kes, Bedknobs and Broomsticks, The Snowman, The Wicker Man, Modern Family, Four Weddings and a Funeral, British soap operas Coronation Street and EastEnders, Spanish TV show Cuéntame cómo pasó, and Boyle's own Trainspotting on the top and the inside of the house on the bottom. A large group of dancers, centred around Frankie and June (19-year-old Henrique Costa and 18-year-old Jasmine Breinburg) on a night out, performed to an assortment of British popular songs arranged broadly chronologically, beginning with "Going Underground" by The Jam, suggesting a ride on the London Underground. During this track images of the Underground were projected onto the house and former London Mayor Ken Livingstone was briefly seen driving the train. Throughout the sequence cast members were texting each other or placing social networking status updates on the Internet. Frankie and June first notice each other as a snippet from "Wonderful Tonight" by Eric Clapton plays, but when Frankie saw that June had dropped her phone on the Tube, he set off to return it (communicating using last number redial to her sister's phone).

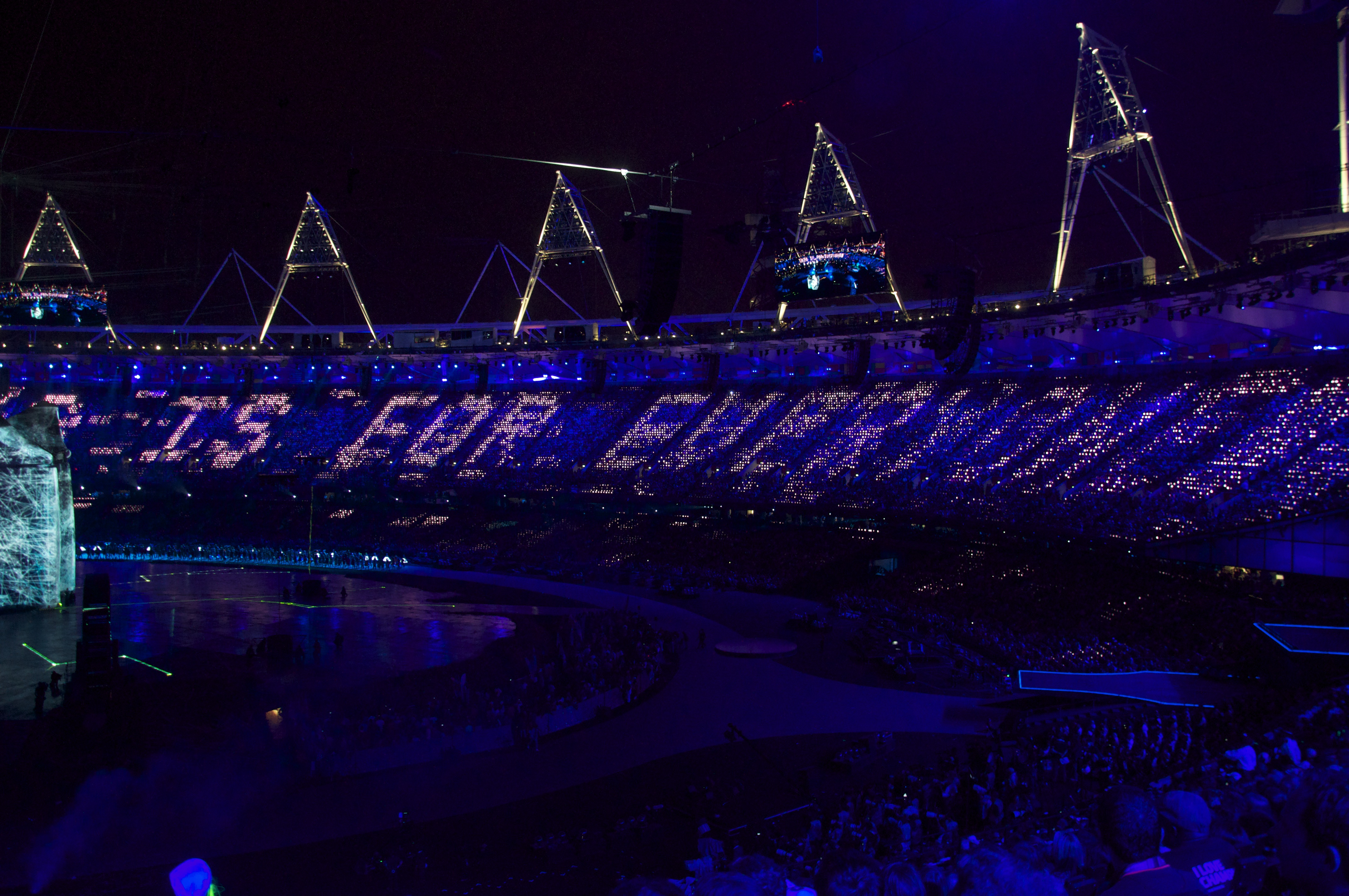
Tim Berners-Lee's tweet, "This is for everyone"

An extended dance sequence followed, with songs including "My Generation" by The Who, "(I Can't Get No) Satisfaction" by the Rolling Stones, "My Boy Lollipop" sung by Millie Small, "All Day and All of the Night" by the Kinks, "She Loves You" by the Beatles (with footage of the band performing the song), "Trampled Under Foot" by Led Zeppelin, "Starman" by David Bowie, "Bohemian Rhapsody" by Queen (during which the sound of the TARDIS from Doctor Who could be heard), "Pretty Vacant" by the Sex Pistols (during which dancers on power jumpers wearing large heads with Mohawk hairstyles performed a pogo dance, and the lyrics to the song were spelt out in LED lights around the stadium), "Blue Monday" by New Order, "Relax" by Frankie Goes to Hollywood (during which Frankie, asked by June for his name, replied by revealing one of the band's "Frankie say..." T-shirts), "Back to Life (However Do You Want Me)" by Soul II Soul, "Step On" by Happy Mondays, "Sweet Dreams (Are Made of This)" by Eurythmics, "Firestarter" by The Prodigy, and "Born Slippy .NUXX" by Underworld, ending with the cast singing "I'm Forever Blowing Bubbles" as Frankie and June walked towards each other. A sequence from the film Four Weddings and a Funeral was projected behind them; when they kissed, a montage of memorable kisses from film, TV and real life was shown (including one of the first interracial kisses on British television in Emergency Ward 10 and the first lesbian kiss from Brookside, which in some countries, including Saudi Arabia, then became the first lesbian kiss ever shown on pre-watershed television), while "Song 2" by Blur was played. A live performance of "Bonkers" by Dizzee Rascal (who grew up in the host borough of Tower Hamlets) followed, along with a further sequence in which all the cast (and Britain's Got Talent dancing duo Signature) attend a party at June's house while, Amy Winehouse's "Valerie", Muse's "Uprising", and Tinie Tempah's "Pass Out" played.

At the close, while "Heaven" by Emeli Sandé was played, the larger house was raised to reveal Tim Berners-Lee working at a NeXT Computer, like the one on which he invented the World Wide Web. He tweeted "This is for everyone", instantly spelt out in LED lights around the stadium. The programme explained "Music connects us with each other and with the most important moments in our lives. One of the things that makes those connections possible is the World Wide Web". Boyle wanted to honour Berners-Lee for having made the World Wide Web free and available to everyone (hence the tweet), rather than seeking a commercial profit from it.

=== Abide with Me (22:09–22:20) ===
A filmed sequence showed extracts from the torch relay around the UK, to the music "I Heard Wonders" by David Holmes. This then cut live to show David Beckham driving a dramatically illuminated motor boat down the River Thames and under Tower Bridge, to fireworks, while footballer Jade Bailey held on to the torch in the boat. This section had been rehearsed on 24 July 2012 when the close-up shots were pre-recorded, and was directed by Stephen Daldry.

There was then a tribute to "..friends and family of those in the stadium who cannot be here tonight", including the victims of the "7/7" 2005 London bombings (on the day after London had been awarded the Games). Photos of people who had died were displayed on screens as a memorial, accompanied by an excerpt from Brian Eno's ambient work "An Ending (Ascent)". The hymn "Abide with Me" was then sung by Emeli Sandé while a group of dancers choreographed by and including Akram Khan performed a contemporary dance on the theme of mortality.

=== Welcome (22:20–00:00) ===
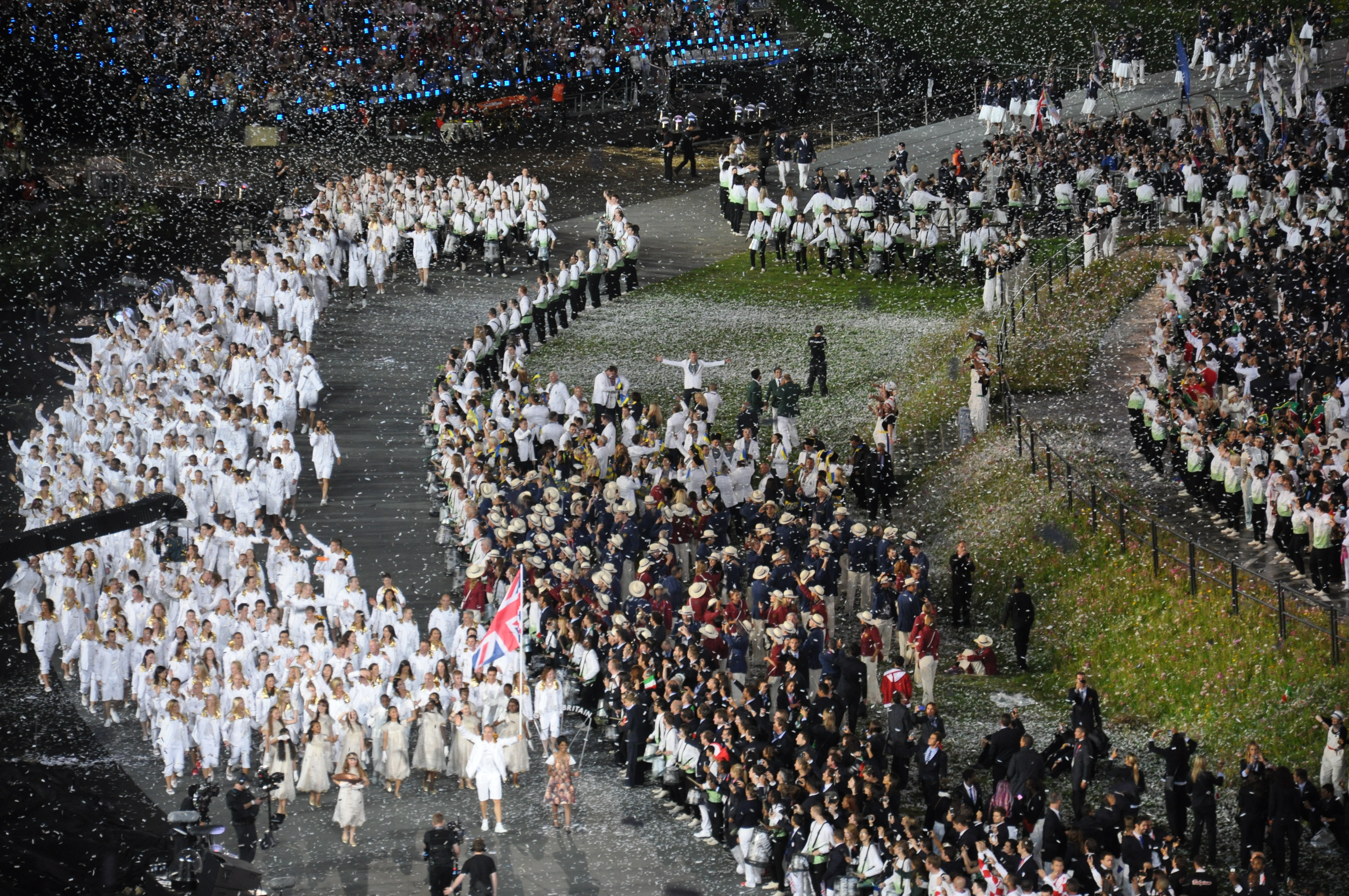
Team GB enters the 2012 Summer Olympics Parade of Nations last

The Parade of Nations of athletes (drawn from the 10,490 competing) and officials from 204 nations (and also the "Independent Olympic Athletes") was led, according to custom, by the Greek team, followed by other competing countries in alphabetical order, and finally the host nation Great Britain. Each of the 205 teams entered the stadium led by their flagbearer, accompanied by a child volunteer carrying a copper petal (later revealed to be part of the cauldron) and a young woman carrying a sign with the country's name in English (and wearing a dress made from fabric printed with photos of people who had applied to be Olympic volunteers).

The parade was accompanied by mainly British dance tracks and popular songs, including "Galvanize" by Chemical Brothers, "West End Girls" by Pet Shop Boys, "Rolling in the Deep" by Adele, "Stayin' Alive" by the Bee Gees and both "Where the Streets Have No Name" and "Beautiful Day" by Irish band U2, with Great Britain entering to David Bowie's song "'Heroes'". Welsh drum and bass DJ High Contrast mixed and sequenced the music for the athletes' parade.

Music with a fast rhythm of 120 bpm was used in an attempt to keep the teams walking quickly around the stadium, and this was reinforced by the drummers in the stadium; nevertheless the parade part of the programme took 1 hour 40 minutes to complete, compared to the 1 hour 29 minutes estimated in the official media guide. Once all of the athletes were inside the stadium, seven billion small pieces of paper were dropped from a Westland helicopter, each piece representing one person on Earth. Each nation's flag was planted on the Glastonbury Tor.

=== Bike a.m. (00:00–00:07 BST 28 July) ===
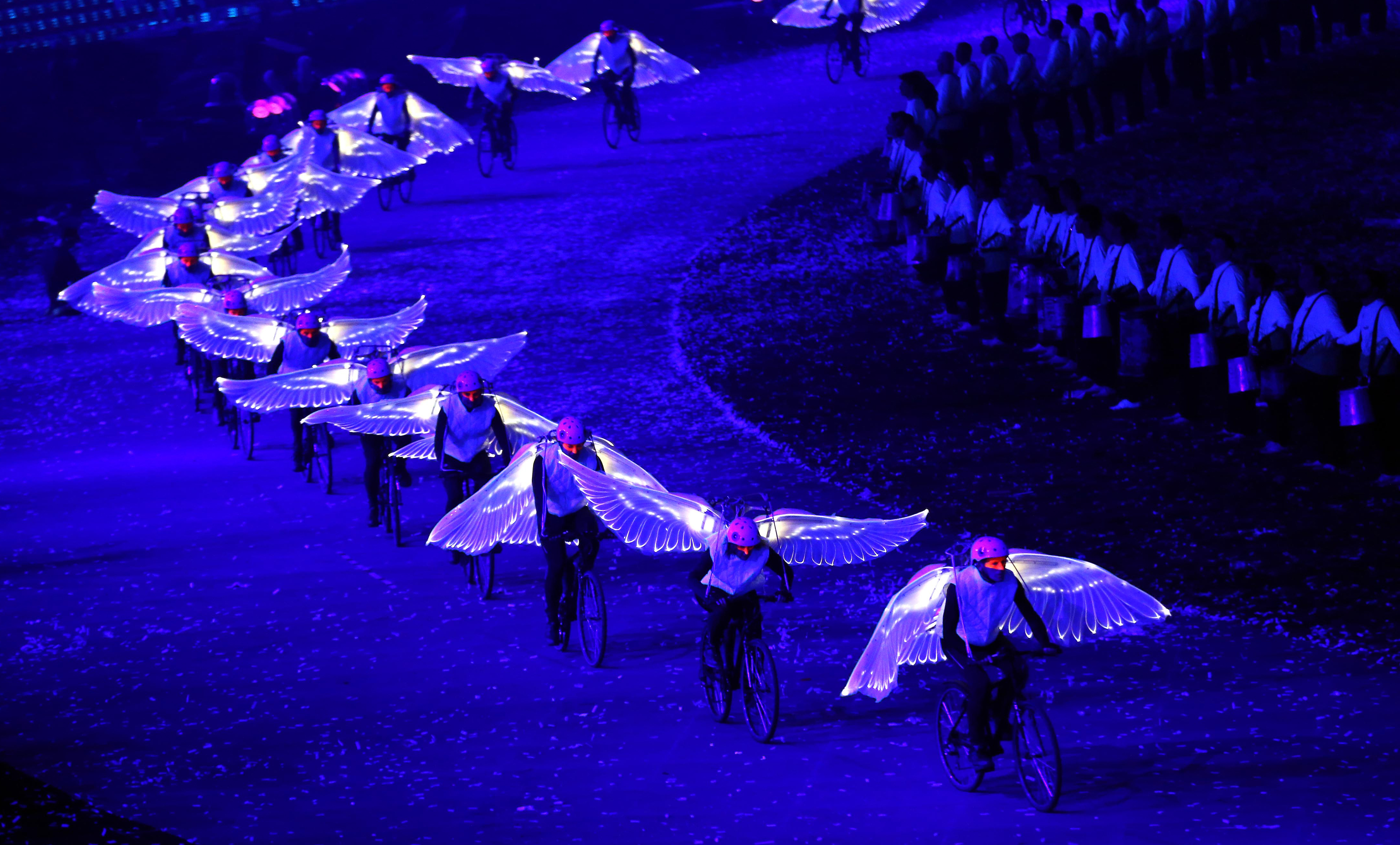
Doves at the opening ceremony

Once the athletes had gathered in the centre of the stadium, Arctic Monkeys performed "I Bet You Look Good on the Dancefloor" and The Beatles' "Come Together", the latter while 75 cyclists circled the stadium with wings lit by LEDs representing Doves of Peace. Doves were traditionally released at Olympic opening ceremonies, although real birds have not been used since 1992. A single dove cyclist, his beak painted yellow in honour of Bradley Wiggins, appeared to fly out of the stadium.

=== Let the Games Begin (00:07–00:24) ===
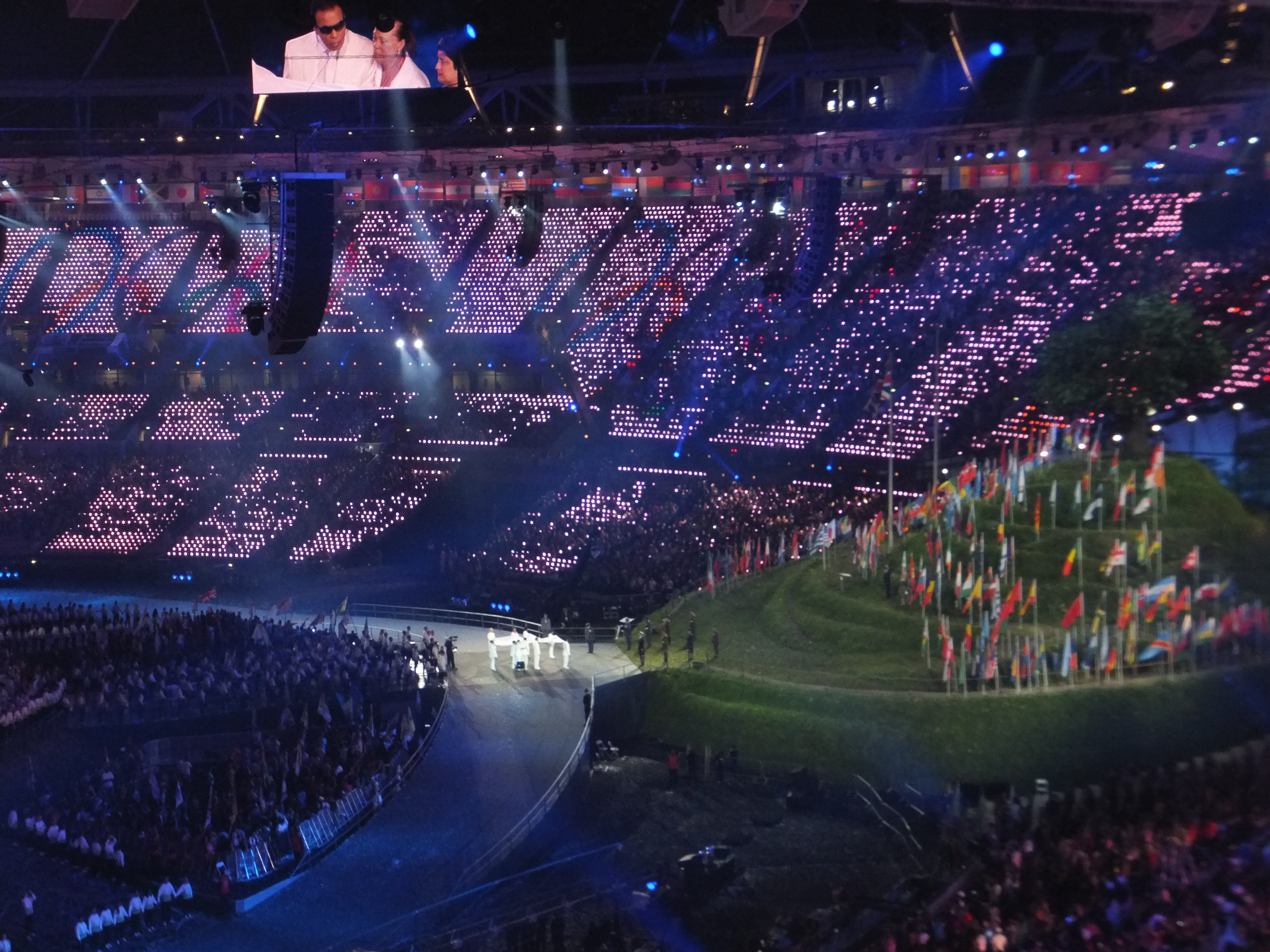
Muhammad Ali receives the Olympic Flag

The formal part of the ceremony was introduced by Sebastian Coe, speaking from the Tor and surrounded by flags of the participating nations. He welcomed the watching world to London. He expressed pride in being British and part of the Olympic movement, and said that the Olympics "brings together the people of the world...to celebrate what is best about mankind". He continued to speak of the "truth and drama" of sport, and then thanked Britain for "making all this possible". Rogge responded by thanking London, stating that it was the third time that London had held the Games, following 1908, held at short notice when Rome was unable to do so (after a volcanic eruption), and 1948 three years after the end of World War II. Rogge thanked the thousands of volunteers, to huge cheers. He announced that for the first time in Olympic history, every team had female participants. Rogge acknowledged the important role the UK had played as "the birthplace of modern sport", codifying its "fair play" ethos and building sport into the school curriculum. He appealed to athletes to play fairly and be drug-free, according to the values of Baron de Coubertin, reminding them that they were role models who would "inspire a generation". After expressing these sentiments again briefly in French, he invited the Queen to open the Games.

The Queen declared the competition officially open, immediately followed by a trumpet fanfare based on a theme from Tubular Bells by Mike Oldfield and then a fireworks display. The 2012 ceremony was the second time the Queen had opened an Olympic Games, the first being the 1976 Summer Olympics in Montreal in her capacity as Queen of Canada. It was also the first time any individual had opened a Summer Olympics twice (two more Olympiads had been opened on her behalf, with a further two Winter Games opened on her behalf).

The Olympic Flag was carried by eight people chosen from around the world to embody the Olympic values: Doreen Lawrence (chosen for her "tireless thirst for justice"), Haile Gebrselassie (for his "fight against poverty"), Sally Becker (for her "courage"), Ban Ki-moon (as UN secretary-general), Leymah Gbowee (as "a great peacemaker"), Shami Chakrabarti (for "her integrity"), Daniel Barenboim (for bringing "harmony in place of discord"), and Marina Silva (as UN Champion of the Earth). The flag paused in front of Muhammad Ali (invited to represent "respect, confidence, conviction, dedication, generosity and spiritual strength"), who held it for a few moments. The flag was received by a colour guard of Her Majesty's Armed Forces and hoisted to the Olympic Anthem, performed by the LSO and the Grimethorpe Colliery Band. A brief reprise of "And I will Kiss" commenced the Olympic Oaths, taken by taekwondo athlete Sarah Stevenson on behalf of the athletes, by British AIBA Referee Mik Basi on behalf of the officials, and by Eric Farrell on behalf of the coaches.

=== There Is a Light That Never Goes Out (00:24–00:38) ===
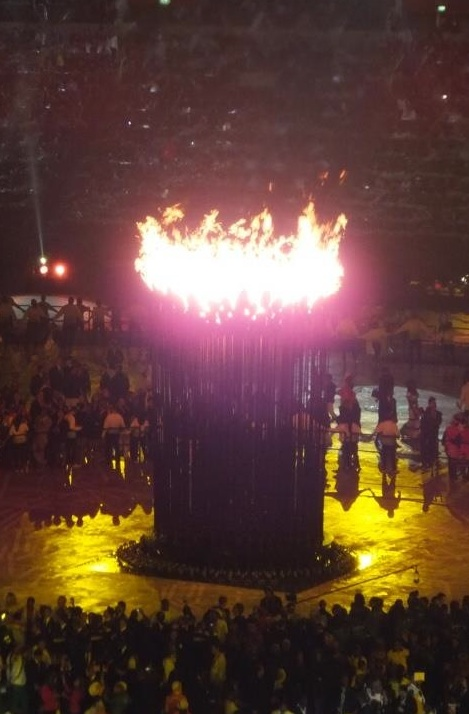
Thomas Heatherwick's Olympic Cauldron after being lit

This section was named after the song of the same name by The Smiths. The motorboat driven by David Beckham arrived with the Olympic Flame via the Limehouse Cut and the Lee Navigation. Steve Redgrave lit his torch from that on the boat, and carried it into the stadium through an honour guard of 500 of the construction workers who had built the Olympic Park. He passed the flame on to a team of seven young people, each nominated by a famous British Olympian to convey the Games' aim to "inspire a generation". Six of the team were athletes, and the seventh was a volunteer young ambassador.

The teenagers made a lap of the stadium, each carrying the torch in turn, while Alex Trimble, lead singer of Two Door Cinema Club, performed "Caliban's Dream" with the Dockhead Choir, Only Men Aloud, Elizabeth Roberts, and Esme Smith. This had been written especially for the ceremony by Rick Smith of Underworld.

Each young athlete was greeted by their nominating Olympian (watched by 260 British medallists from previous summer and winter Games since London 1948) and presented with their own torch, which was then lit from the flame. They jogged through a corridor between assembled athletes to the centre of the stadium, where the 204 copper petals (each inscribed with the name of the team it accompanied during the parade) were now seen in a circular formation attached to long pipes (the petals were to accompany each team home after the competition, as a souvenir). The young athletes lit some of the petals, and when the flame had spread to all of them, the pipes rose slowly from the floor of the stadium and converged to form the cauldron. The cauldron lighters were (nominator in brackets):

- Callum Airlie (Shirley Robertson)
- Jordan Duckitt (Duncan Goodhew)
- Desiree Henry (Daley Thompson)
- Katie Kirk (Mary Peters)
- Cameron MacRitchie (Steve Redgrave)
- Aidan Reynolds (Lynn Davies)
- Adelle Tracey (Kelly Holmes)

The cauldron designed by Thomas Heatherwick was described as "one of the best-kept secrets of the opening ceremony": until this point, its design, location, and who would light it had not been revealed.

=== And in the end (00:38–00:46) ===
A flurry of spectacular fireworks accompanied by Pink Floyd's song "Eclipse" was supported by images of memorable Olympic victories shown on the big screens, with the stadium pixels showing Jesse Owens running. The climax of this section was a live view of the Olympic rings 34 kilometres (21 miles) above the Earth, transmitted from one of the balloons launched three and a half hours earlier. The sky was then lit by searchlights piercing the smoke (another iconic London image) from the fireworks, the Orbit tower was illuminated. Paul McCartney and his band performed the closing section of "The End", and then "Hey Jude", with its chorus sung by the audience to close the ceremony at 00:46 BST.

== Music ==
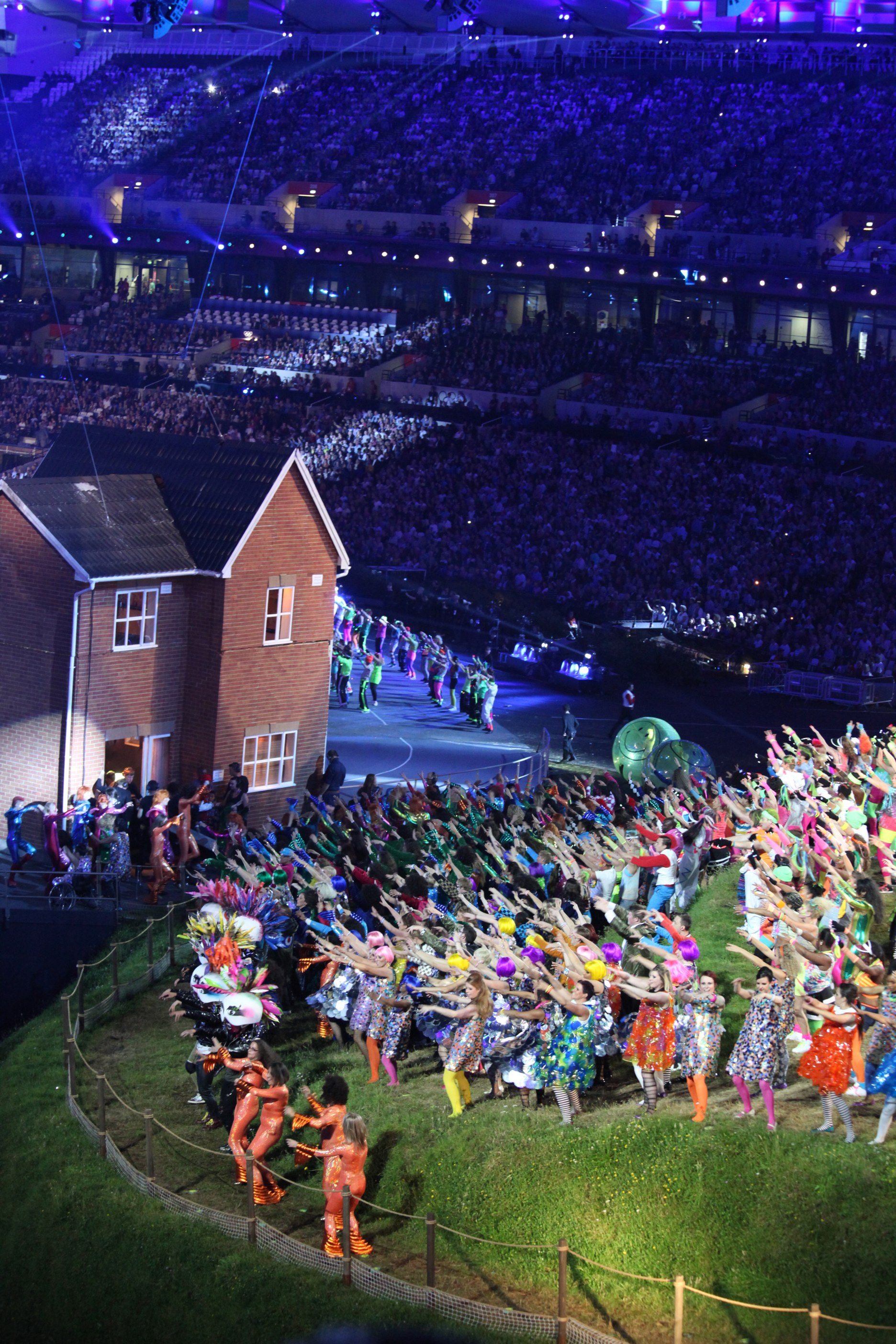
Segment of the opening ceremony celebrating British music

The eclectic programme of music was chosen to showcase almost exclusively British music with pieces representing the UK's four nations. It included classical works by British composers such as Hubert Parry, and performances by UK choirs and orchestras. The focus was mainly on music of the 1960s onwards, causing one Chinese journalist to ask: "Will this be the most rock and roll opening ceremony ever?".

Rick Smith and Underworld composed pieces for the ceremony, including "And I Will Kiss" used during the "Pandemonium" section, and "Caliban's Dream" heard during the lighting of the cauldron. These were favourably reviewed; in The Guardian, Michael Hann wrote "Underworld ... had a bit of a triumph: the builds and fades they learned in the world of dance music lent the sometimes overwhelming visual spectacle a sense of structure".

Musical motifs were used to bind the ceremony programme together: for example, the "whistling" theme first heard during the minute's silence embedded within "And I Will Kiss" returned frequently – behind the fury as the ring was being forged, emerging triumphant as the five rings came together, and again later as the main theme of "Caliban's Dream" while the flame was paraded around the stadium.

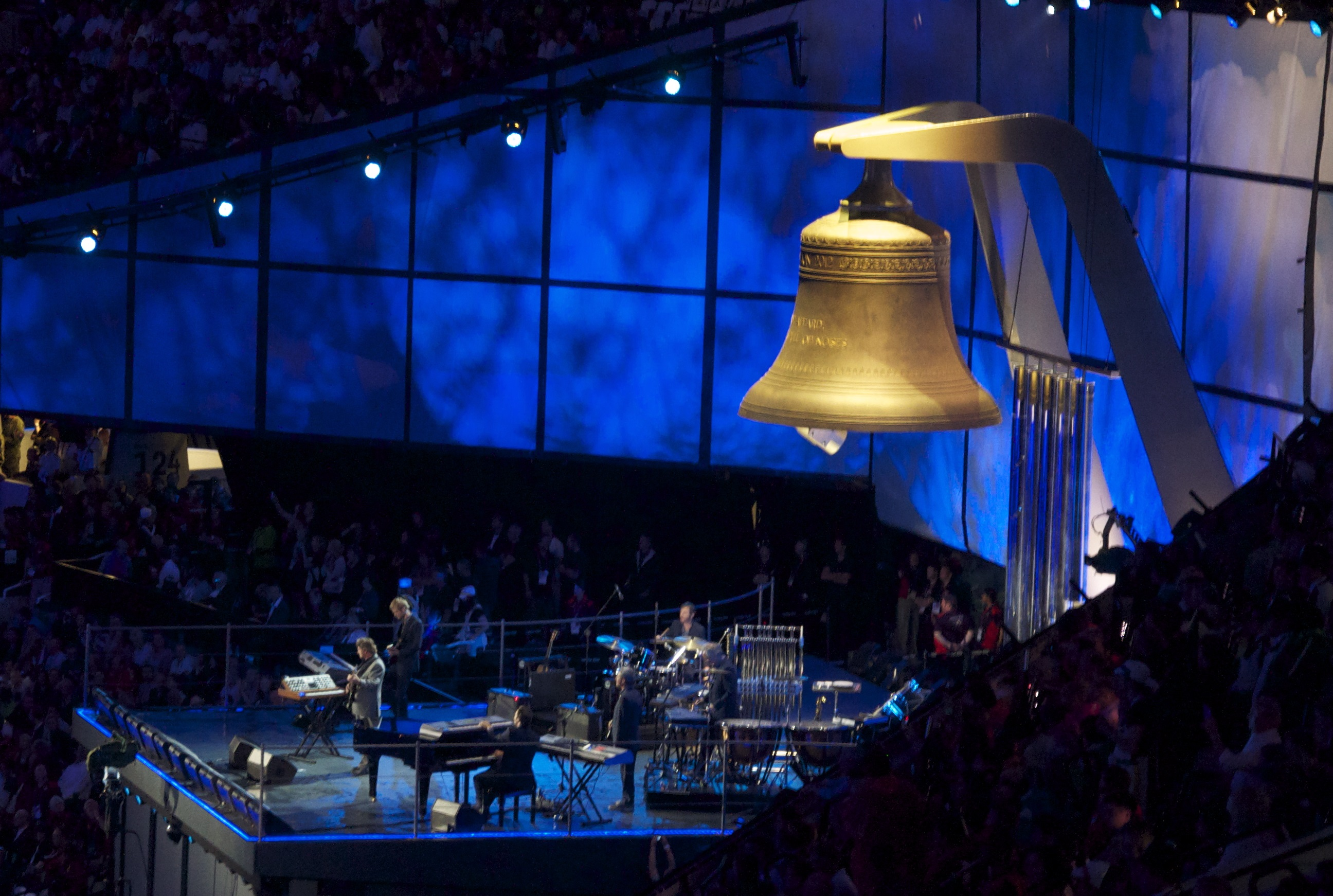
Mike Oldfield performing "Tubular Bells" at the opening ceremony

Bells were a theme of the opening day of the Olympics, starting at 8:12 am with artist Martin Creed's Work No. 1197: All the Bells, when bells were rung across the UK including forty strikes of Big Ben. "The sound of bells is the sound of England", Boyle had told volunteers during rehearsal. Much of the music for the ceremony contained "bell" references, linking to the large bell forged for the ceremony and evoking bells as "the sound of freedom and peace". Modified sequences based on the traditional British eight-bell peal underlaid "And I Will Kiss" and carried through into the "Tubular Bells"/NHS section, with handbells and a tolling large bell featured on "Caliban's Dream" and at key points in the ceremony. A handbell chime also played after the close, as the stadium emptied.

Boyle approached many of the artists personally, to see if they would be interested in performing, and he also flew to Barbados for an hour-long meeting with Mike Oldfield. A few turned him down, including Elvis Costello and David Bowie. The performing artists were paid a nominal £1 fee to make their contracts legally binding.

The pre-recorded soundtrack Isles of Wonder was released on iTunes at midnight of 28 July 2012, with a two-disc CD set released on 2 August. Within two days, the download album had topped the iTunes album charts in Britain, France, Belgium and Spain, and reached No. 5 in the United States, as well as being No. 5 in the British album charts. Rick Smith's concluding comment in the CD cover notes was: "The isle is full of noises. The soundtrack writes itself."

Main musical items in the opening ceremony, in the order first performed (not including the music used in the Parade of Nations)
Piece	Artist	Written by	Notes	Start time (BBC iPlayer)
"Sailor's Boots"	Frank Turner	Frank Turner	Played during the prologue, not on iPlayer	
"Wessex Boy"	Frank Turner	Frank Turner, Nigel Powell	Played during the prologue, not on iPlayer	
"I Still Believe"	Frank Turner	Frank Turner, Nigel Powell	Played during the prologue, not on iPlayer	
"Nimrod" (from the Enigma Variations)	LSO On Track youth orchestra Conducted by François-Xavier Roth; Assistant conductor: Matthew Gibson	Edward Elgar; Arr. Gareth Glyn	Played during the prologue (an excerpt from a BBC Radio 4 Shipping Forecast was played over a part) also played during Kenneth Branagh's "Be not afeard" speech in the Pandemonium section.	00:00:00; 00:12:00
"The Road Goes on Forever" (One Minute to Midnight Mix) (which samples "Baba O'Riley" by The Who)	High Contrast		Played during the one minute countdown to the ceremony going live to the world	00:03:10
"Surf Solar"	Fuck Buttons (credited as "F Buttons")	Andrew Hung and Benjamin John Power	Green and Pleasant Land filmed segment	00:04:11
"Eton Boating Song"	Eton College School Concert Choir and Orchestra	William Johnson Cory, Capt. Algernon Drummond, Evelyn Wodehouse	Green and Pleasant Land filmed segment	00:05:25
"Time"	Pink Floyd	Roger Waters, David Gilmour, Nick Mason, Richard Wright	Green and Pleasant Land filmed segment (Ticking clock/heartbeat bit as the Houses of Parliament and Big Ben are shown). Big Ben then strikes	00:05:43
Variations (Theme to The South Bank Show)	Julian Lloyd Webber	Niccolò Paganini; Arr. Julian Lloyd Webber	Green and Pleasant Land filmed segment	00:05:48
"God Save the Queen"	Sex Pistols	Lydon/Matlock/Jones/Cook	Green and Pleasant Land filmed segment	00:05:53
Theme to EastEnders		Simon May and Leslie Osborne	Green and Pleasant Land filmed segment	00:06:05
"Under The House"	P.I.L.	John Lydon, Martin Atkins, Keith Levene	Green and Pleasant Land filmed segment	00:06:09
"London Calling"	The Clash	Joe Strummer, Mick Jones, Paul Simonon, Topper Headon	Green and Pleasant Land filmed segment	00:06:16
"Pomp and Circumstance"; Op.39: March, No 1 in D	London Symphony Orchestra	Edward Elgar	Green and Pleasant Land filmed segment	00:06:22
"Smile"	Lily Allen	L. Allen, Iyiola Babalola, Darren Lewis	Green and Pleasant Land filmed segment	00:06:28
"Map of the Problematique"	Muse	Matt Bellamy	Green and Pleasant Land filmed segment, played during the Olympic Games posters display; runs into the start of the live programme from the stadium with the balloon countdown from 10–1	00:06:31
"Jerusalem"	The Dockhead Choir; Choir coordinator: Mag Shepherd	Poem: William Blake; Music: Hubert Parry	English choir, sung live in the stadium	00:08:16; 00:10:53
"Londonderry Air" ("Danny Boy")	The Belfast Philharmonic Phil Kids Choir and JAM Junior Academy of Music	Traditional; Lyrics: Frederic Weatherly	Filmed segment: Northern Irish choir on the Giant's Causeway	00:09:08
"Flower of Scotland"	The Big Project	Roy Williamson (The Corries); Arr. Kim Edgar	Filmed segment: Scottish choir at Edinburgh Castle	00:09:40
"Bread of Heaven"	Only Kids Aloud, Only Vale Kids Aloud and the WNO Singing Club	Tune Cwm Rhondda by John Hughes; Lyrics: William Williams; Arr. Tim Rhys-Evans	Filmed segment: Welsh choir at Rhossili Bay	00:10:15
"And I Will Kiss"	Underworld, Evelyn Glennie, The 1000 Pandemonium Drummers; LSO on Track, conducted by François-Xavier Roth; Assistant conductor: Matthew Gibson; The Grimethorpe Colliery Brass Band Orchestrated and conducted by Sandy Smith Steel Band: Nostalgia plus additional singers	Smith/Hyde	Written specially for the opening ceremony, and played live. Pandemonium section about the Industrial Revolution; an orchestral version briefly played before and after the Olympic Oaths later on in the ceremony	00:13:15; 03:30:01; 03:32:31
"Arrival of the Queen of Sheba" from Solomon	London Symphony Orchestra; Conducted by Geoffrey Alexander	George Frideric Handel	Happy and Glorious filmed segment	00:29:00
"Music for the Royal Fireworks": IV. La Rejouissance	London Symphony Orchestra; Conducted by Geoffrey Alexander	George Frideric Handel	Happy and Glorious filmed segment	00:30:28
"Dambusters March"	London Symphony Orchestra; Conducted by Geoffrey Alexander	Eric Coates	Happy and Glorious filmed segment	00:31:08
"James Bond Theme" (from Dr. No)	The John Barry Orchestra	Monty Norman	Happy and Glorious filmed segment	00:33:31
"Fanfare of the Common Welshman"	London Symphony Orchestra	Karl Jenkins	Played as Queen Elizabeth II entered the stadium; later just before the Queen declaring the Games open: a fanfare, then another as the Olympic flag is brought in.	00:34:32; 03:22:37
"Sundowner"	Blanck Mass	Benjamin John Power	Played while the Union Jack was brought in by members of the Armed Forces	00:35:08
"God Save the Queen" (National Anthem)	The Kaos Signing Choir for Deaf and Hearing Children; Signductor: Ali Wood	Composer uncertain	Sung live while the Union Flag was raised	00:37:04
"Tubular Bells"	Mike Oldfield; Alistair Mulloy, Luke Oldfield, Ash Soan; Musical Director: Robin Smith	Mike Oldfield	Second to the right, and straight on till morning segment (NHS/Great Ormond Street Hospital); second time in this section while J. K. Rowling is reading; the monsters and villains arrive.	00:38:37; 00:43:10
"Tubular Bells (Part One - Swing)"	Mike Oldfield	Mike Oldfield	Second to the right, and straight on till morning segment (NHS/Great Ormond Street Hospital) jitterbugging nurses bit	00:40:09
"Secrets / Far Above the Clouds" (from Tubular Bells III)	Alistair Mulloy, Luke Oldfield, Ash Soan; Musical Director: Robin Smith	Mike Oldfield	Second to the right, and straight on till morning segment (NHS/Great Ormond Street Hospital) putting the children to bed, moon shape made with beds, Mary Poppinses/Poppi arrive and vanquish the monsters	00:42:18
"In Dulci Jubilo"	Mike Oldfield; Recorder: Andy Findon	Traditional 14th-century song	Second to the right, and straight on till morning segment (NHS/Great Ormond Street Hospital) Children dance again	00:47:19
"Olympic Tubular Bells Coda"	Mike Oldfield	Mike Oldfield	Second to the right, and straight on till morning segment (NHS/Great Ormond Street Hospital) Piano music then orchestral as children put back to bed (again); giant baby arrives	00:48:48
"Chariots of Fire"	The London Symphony Orchestra conducted by Simon Rattle; Pianist: Iain Farrington; Additional singers featuring Mr. Bean (Rowan Atkinson)	Vangelis; Arr. Howard Goodall; Orchestrated by David Butterworth	Mr. Bean live and filmed segment	00:51:11
"Girls in Grey"	Charles Williams and His Concert Orchestra	Charles Williams	Frankie and June say ... Thanks Tim segment. This track is preceded by the pips.	00:56:27
Theme to The Archers ("Barwick Green")		Arthur Wood	Frankie and June say ... Thanks Tim segment. The Archers theme tune is followed by Michael Fish's weather forecast downplaying the potential impact of the great storm of 1987.	00:56:36
"Black and White Rag"	Winifred Atwell	George Botsford	Frankie and June say ... Thanks Tim segment	00:57:09
"Push the Button"	Sugababes	Dallas Austin, Mutya Buena, Keisha Buchanan, Heidi Range	Frankie and June say ... Thanks Tim segment	00:57:18
"Enola Gay"	Orchestral Manoeuvres in the Dark	Andy McCluskey	Frankie and June say ... Thanks Tim segment	00:57:49
"Food Glorious Food"	from the original soundtrack recording of Oliver!	Lionel Bart; Arr. Green	Frankie and June say ... Thanks Tim segment	00:58:18
"When I Was a Youngster"	Rizzle Kicks	Alexander-Sule/ Stephens/Street/Dring/Edwards/Ray	Frankie and June say ... Thanks Tim segment	00:58:52
"Going Underground"	The Jam	Paul Weller	Frankie and June say ... Thanks Tim segment	00:59:40
"Wonderful Tonight"	Eric Clapton	Eric Clapton	Frankie and June say ... Thanks Tim segment	01:00:48
?	?		Frankie and June say ... Thanks Tim segment orchestral piece – part of the Charlie Chaplin film score?	01:01:08
"My Generation"	The Who	Pete Townshend	Frankie and June say ... Thanks Tim segment	01:01:18
"(I Can't Get No) Satisfaction"	The Rolling Stones	Mick Jagger, Keith Richards	Frankie and June say ... Thanks Tim segment	01:01:38
"My Boy Lollipop"	Millie Small	Robert Spencer, Morris Levy, Johnny Roberts	Frankie and June say ... Thanks Tim segment	01:02:00
"All Day and All of the Night"	The Kinks	Ray Davies	Frankie and June say ... Thanks Tim segment	01:02:17
"She Loves You"	The Beatles	Lennon-McCartney	Frankie and June say ... Thanks Tim segment	01:02:28
"Tiger Feet"	Mud	Nicky Chinn, Mike Chapman	Frankie and June say ... Thanks Tim segment	01:02:51
"Trampled Under Foot"	Led Zeppelin	Jimmy Page, Robert Plant, John Paul Jones, John Bonham	Frankie and June say ... Thanks Tim segment	01:03:15
"A Message to You, Rudy"	The Specials	Dandy Livingstone	Frankie and June say ... Thanks Tim segment	01:03:33
"Starman"	David Bowie	David Bowie	Frankie and June say ... Thanks Tim segment	01:03:42
"Bohemian Rhapsody"	Queen	Freddie Mercury	Frankie and June say ... Thanks Tim segment	01:03:59
"Pretty Vacant"	Sex Pistols	Johnny Rotten, Steve Jones, Paul Cook, Glen Matlock	Frankie and June say ... Thanks Tim segment	01:04:55
"Blue Monday"	New Order	Gillian Gilbert, Peter Hook, Stephen Morris, Bernard Sumner	Frankie and June say ... Thanks Tim segment	01:06:02
"Relax"	Frankie Goes To Hollywood	Peter Gill, Holly Johnson, Brian Nash, Mark O'Toole	Frankie and June say ... Thanks Tim segment	01:06:26
"Back to Life (However Do You Want Me)"	Soul II Soul (featuring Caron Wheeler)	Jazzie B, Caron Wheeler, Nellee Hooper, Simon Law	Frankie and June say ... Thanks Tim segment	01:06:35
"Step On"	Happy Mondays	John Kongos, Christos Demetriou	Frankie and June say ... Thanks Tim segment	01:06:54
"Sweet Dreams (Are Made of This)"	Eurythmics	Annie Lennox, Dave Stewart	Frankie and June say ... Thanks Tim segment	01:06:58
"Firestarter"	The Prodigy; Contains samples of "SOS" by The Breeders	Kim Deal, Anne Dudley, Keith Flint, Trevor Horn, Liam Howlett, J.J. Jeczalik, Gary Langan, Paul Morley	Frankie and June say ... Thanks Tim segment	01:07:29
"Born Slippy .NUXX"	Underworld	Rick Smith, Karl Hyde, Darren Emerson	Frankie and June say ... Thanks Tim segment	01:07:57
"I'm Forever Blowing Bubbles"		Music: John Kellette; Lyrics: James Kendis, James Brockman and Nat Vincent	Frankie and June say ... Thanks Tim segment	01:08:17
"Song 2"	Blur	Damon Albarn, Graham Coxon, Alex James, Dave Rowntree	Frankie and June say ... Thanks Tim segment. Montage of kisses including the ground-breaking Brookside pre-watershed lesbian kiss in 1994.	01:09:00
"Bonkers"	Dizzee Rascal	Dylan Kwabena Mills, Armand Van Helden	Played live during the Frankie and June say ... Thanks Tim segment.	01:09:12; 01:10:20; 01:11:42
"Nimma Nimma"	A. R. Rahman	A. R. Rahman	Frankie and June say ... Thanks Tim segment	01:10:05
"Valerie"	Amy Winehouse and Mark Ronson	Dave McCabe, Abi Harding, Sean Payne, Russell Pritchard, Boyan Chowdhury	Frankie and June say ... Thanks Tim segment	01:10:42
"Uprising"	Muse	Matt Bellamy	Frankie and June say ... Thanks Tim segment	01:10:56
"Random Antics"	Mikey J feat. Kano	Asante/Robinson		
"Pass Out"	Tinie Tempah	Patrick Chukwuemeka Okogwu, McKenzie	Frankie and June say ... Thanks Tim segment	01:11:29
"Heaven"	Emeli Sandé	Sandé/Spencer/Khan/Chegwin/Craze	Frankie and June say ... Thanks Tim segment	01:11:57 As the house lifts up and reveals Tim Berners-Lee
"I Heard Wonders"	David Holmes		There Is A Light That Never Goes Out filmed segment: recap of 1948 London Olympics, merging to the Olympic torch being lit in the Temple of Hera at Olympia in Greece and its progress throughout the UK on the Olympic torch relay, ending with David Beckham and Jade Bailey in the speedboat on the Thames with the Olympic torch	01:13:35
"An Ending (Ascent)"	Brian Eno	Brian Eno	Played during the display of memorial photographs	01:18:29
"Abide With Me"	Emeli Sandé	Henry Francis Lyte; Tune: "Eventide" by William Henry Monk	Preceded by a single bell toll; sung live	01:19:14
"Welcome"	Produced by Lincoln Barrett, John Harris and Rick Smith; Mixed by Simon Gogerly		Medley of various songs played during the Athletes' Parade	
"I Bet You Look Good on the Dancefloor"	Arctic Monkeys	Lyrics by: Alex Turner Music by: Arctic Monkeys	Played live	03:04:46
"Come Together"	Arctic Monkeys	Lennon-McCartney	Played live	03:07:36
"Sundowner"	London Symphony Orchestra	Benjamin John Power; Arr. Rick Smith; Orchestrated by Geoffrey Alexander	Played as the Olympic Flag is being paraded	03:23:06
"Olympic Anthem"	London Symphony Orchestra conducted by Geoffrey Alexander; Brass band: The Grimethorpe Colliery Band conducted by Sandy Smith	Lyrics: Kostis Palamas; Music: Spyridon Samaras; Arr. Kirsty Whalley and Guy Barker	Played as the Olympic flag is raised	03:26:12
"Sundowner"	Blanck Mass	Benjamin John Power	Played as David Beckham and Jade Bailey come up the Limehouse Cut in the speedboat with the Olympic torch and hand over to Steve Redgrave, who runs with it into the Olympic Stadium	03:28:14
"Caliban's Dream"	Underworld, the Dockhead Choir, Evelyn Glennie, Only Men Aloud, Elizabeth Roberts, Esme Smith and Alex Trimble; London Symphony Orchestra LSO orchestrated and conducted by Geoffrey Alexander	Rick Smith; Soprano lead and choral score written and arranged by Rick and Esme Smith; Drum score arranged by Rick Smith and Paul Clarvis Smith	Written specially for the opening ceremony, and played live. The music that accompanied the arrival of the torch into the Olympic Stadium and the lighting of the cauldron, ending with the soprano solo	03:33:31
"Eclipse"	Pink Floyd	Roger Waters	Played during the final fireworks display	03:40:53
"The End"	Paul McCartney	Lennon-McCartney	A brief excerpt was played live, followed by the single toll of a bell.	03:42:42
"Hey Jude"	Paul McCartney	Lennon-McCartney	Played live	03:43:42

== Anthems ==
- National Anthem of the United Kingdom – Kaos Signing Choir for Deaf and Hearing Children
- (International Olympic Committee) Olympic Anthem – London Symphony Orchestra

== Technical aspects ==
The main loading of the stadium started on 10 May and took ten weeks of what was the wettest summer for a hundred years, posing considerable challenges. Dismantling the staging took just sixty hours. The infield staging area was 2.5 metres high, and had to accommodate the elements revealed during the ceremony, such as the chimneys and beam engines from "Pandemonium", and the cauldron. To ensure that it remained secret, the cauldron was code-named "Betty", and installed and tested at night.

The stadium was rigged with a one million watt sound system and more than 500 speakers. Some 15,000 square metres (3.7 acres) of staging and 12,956 props were used, as well as 7,346 square metres (1.815 acres) of turf including crops. 70,799 25 centimetre (10 inch) pixel panels were placed around the stadium, including between every seat. Each panel connected to a central computer and was fitted with nine full-colour LED pixels by Tait Technology. These enabled images to be broadcast during the performance, such as of a 1960s go-go dancer, a London Underground train, and a representation of the birth of the internet. The audience was also able to participate by waving the paddles to create a twinkling effect. These animations were designed by 59 Productions and the video animations were produced by Chinese company Crystal CG. The 2D to 3D transformation and mapping of video content onto the panels were done by Avolites Media media server consoles.

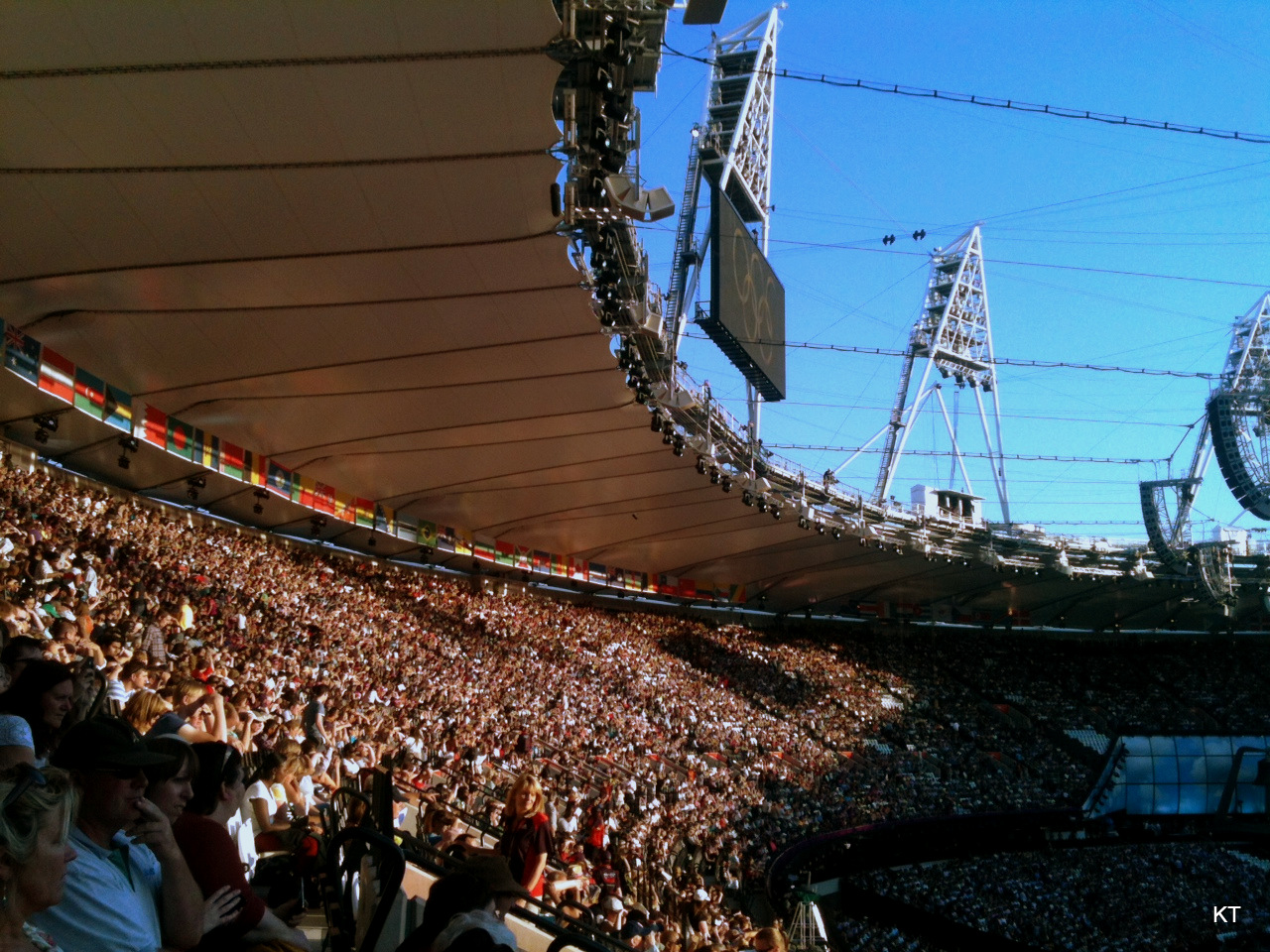
At the technical rehearsal of the Opening Ceremony

Technical director Piers Shepperd masterminded the complex change from rural to industrial during "Pandemonium". The seven inflatable chimneys were made by Airworks, and varied in height (three were 22-metre (72 ft), two were 23-metre (75 ft) and two were 30-metre (98 ft) high). They were made of soft fabric, with an outer layer of printed brick pattern. Each contained four industrial fans at the base to inflate them, and a smoke machine near the top, and were hoisted into the air from the overhead rigs. Life-size beam engines were constructed onstage by teams of stage hands and members of the Volunteer Staging Team. At the climax of "Pandemonium", in the Olympic ring forging scene, amber lights lit in sequence created the illusion of a 30-metre (98 ft) molten steel river, with pyrotechnic smoke and dry ice as steam. The original grass floor surface had been removed to reveal a giant stylised map of London.

Working alongside the professional crew were more than 800 volunteers; some were production arts students from British drama schools. Many had been working on the Olympic and Paralympic ceremonies since early 2012 at the Three Mills Studios and Dagenham rehearsal sites, before moving to the Stadium on 16 June. The thousands of cast were cued and co-ordinated by directions received through earphones ("in-ear monitors"), and adjustments were made during the performance: for example, during Pandemonium extra volunteers were sent to make sure all the turf was cleared on time. The earphones also carried a continuous electronic metronomic four-beat to keep everyone walking and moving in time with the music.

In July 2013 it was revealed that on the morning of the ceremony, Britain's surveillance headquarters GCHQ had detected a credible cyber attack threat that could have killed the lighting system in the stadium. Counter-measures were taken, and in the afternoon contingency plans were discussed with government ministers at a meeting in the Cabinet Office briefing room. However, this attack never materialised.

== Ceremony key team ==
- Artistic director: Danny Boyle
- Producer: Tracey Seaward
- Designers: Suttirat Anne Larlarb and Mark Tildesley
- Writer: Frank Cottrell-Boyce
- Music director: Rick Smith (Underworld)
- Associate director: Paulette Randall
- Movement director: Toby Sedgwick
- Head of mass movement choreography: Steve Boyd
- Choreographers: Temujin Gill, Kenrick "H2O" Sandy and Akram Khan
- Video editor: Sascha Dhillon
- Visual effects supervisor: Adam Gascoyne
- Executive producer, production design: Mark Fisher
- Executive producer, creative: Stephen Daldry
- Lighting designer: Patrick Woodroffe
- Associate lighting designer: Adam Bassett
- Lead lighting programmer: Tim Routledge
- Soundscape designer: Gareth Fry
- Technical director: Piers Shepperd
- Technical manager (technical design and staging): Jeremy Lloyd
- Technical manager (aerial): James Lee
- Technical manager (lighting, audio-visual, power): Nick Jones
- Technical manager (services and special projects): Scott Buchanan
- Senior production manager (audio and communications): Chris Ekers
- Executive producer, broadcast: Hamish Hamilton
- Executive producer, production: Catherine Ugwu
- Press & publicity: Christopher Mitchell
- Bike choreographer: Bob Haro
- Bike project manager: Paul Hughes
- Announcers: Marc Edwards and Layla Anna-Lee
- Ceremonies sound designer: Bobby Aitken
- Ceremonies RF spectrum planning and management: Steve Caldwell
- Ceremonies monitor engineer: Steve Watson
- Ceremonies front of house engineer: Richard Sharratt
- Production manager radio mics and IEMs: Alison Dale
- Artist security director: Richard Barry
- Ceremonies Financial Controller: Andrew Slater
- Production stage manager: Sam Hunter
- Show caller: Julia Whittle

== TV coverage ==
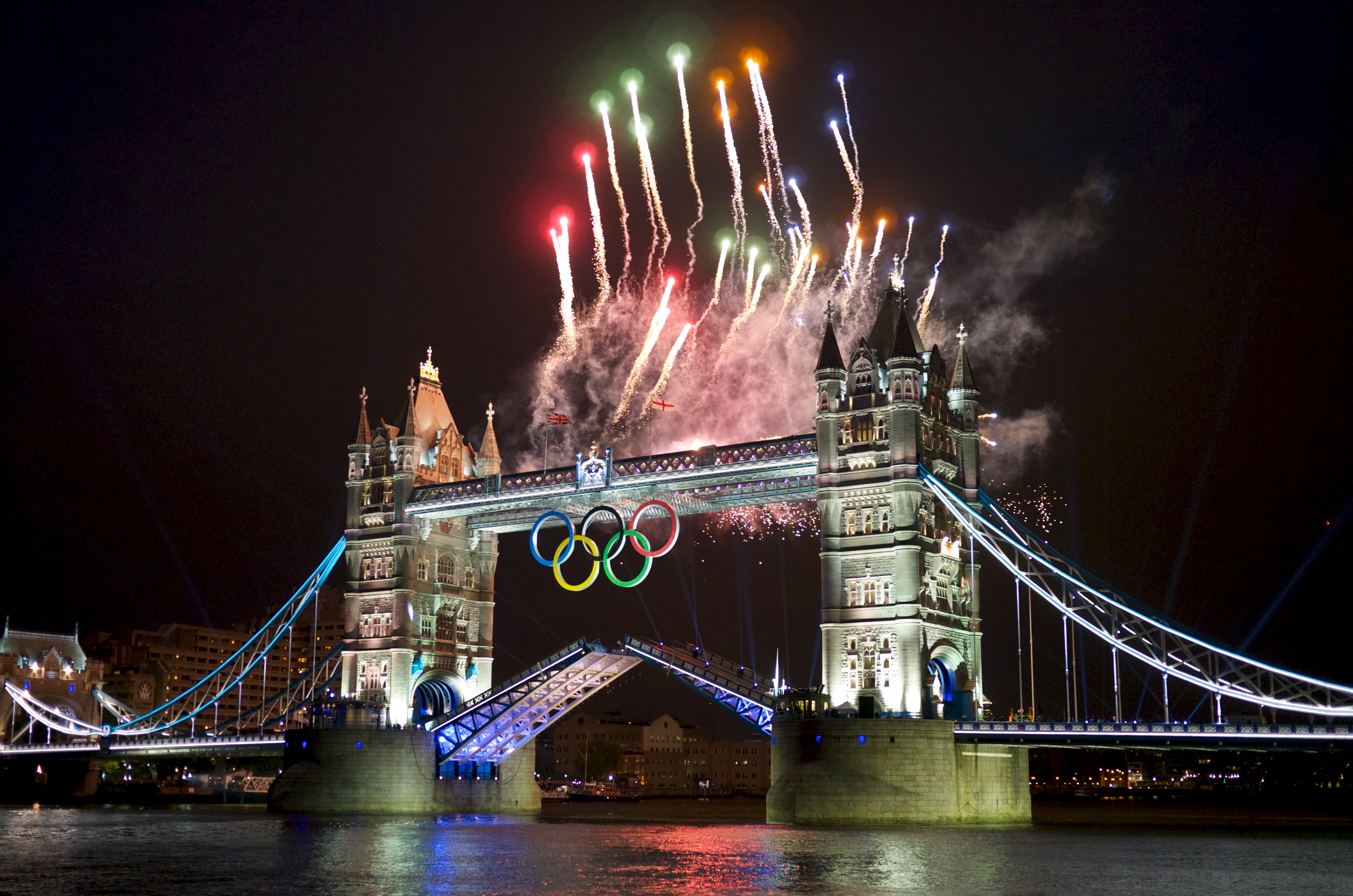
Fireworks at Tower Bridge

The BBC's coverage started at 19:00 and continued uninterrupted until 00:50. The BBC audience averaged about 24.46 million viewers and peaked at approximately 26.9 million. This was the largest average audience for any broadcast since 1996 and one of the top 20 most-watched UK television broadcasts of all time. David Stringer of Associated Press described the coverage as "a success...so far, the BBC's ambitious – and technically tricky – Olympic plan has worked almost without a flaw." Euan Ferguson of The Observer commented that "Coverage of the Olympics so far ... has been near perfect". However, Clive James was critical of the build-up programme, presented by Gary Lineker and Sue Barker. Commentators for the BBC were Huw Edwards, Hazel Irvine and Trevor Nelson, the latter criticised by Andy Dawson of the Daily Mirror as floundering "like a ventriloquist's dummy pumped full of low-grade ketamine". Private talks were held between Boyle and BBC commentators in the run-up to the ceremony. Boyle was unhappy with a voiceover being imposed on the ceremony, which he wanted viewers to be able to enjoy without commentary. The BBC offered several options including "no commentary" coverage for both its TV and online transmissions. Audio description was also provided with commentary by Nick Mullins.

Nearly 41 million US viewers watched NBC's coverage of the event. Criticism was levelled at its decision to tape-delay this broadcast, and not make a live version available even to cable and web users. There were frequent interruptions by commercial breaks. Many US viewers looked for other ways to watch (such as the live BBC feed), despite both NBC and the IOC vowing to crack down on unauthorised streams. More significant criticism was levelled at NBC for cutting to a Ryan Seacrest interview with Michael Phelps during the "memorial wall" tribute including commemoration of the victims of the 7/7 London bombings, which was seen as disrespectful and insensitive. An NBC spokesman said the network had left out that segment because its programming was "tailored for the US audience". There was also criticism of commentators Matt Lauer and Meredith Vieira for suggesting that the Queen had actually jumped out of a helicopter. Vieira and Lauer admitted to not knowing that Tim Berners-Lee was the inventor of the World Wide Web, as she commented "If you haven't heard of him, we haven't either", before Lauer told the audience to Google him. These failings were picked up on Twitter during the broadcast with the hashtag #nbcfail.

The ceremony was recorded by three separate broadcasters: the BBC, the Olympic Broadcasting Services (directed by the Finnish state broadcaster YLE on behalf of the OBS), and by independent production company Done and Dusted, hired by LOCOG and working under Boyle's direction. This was the first time that an independent production company had been used for an Olympic ceremony. This situation led to some tension, as Boyle wanted more artistic control and felt he was getting no co-operation from the OBS. He criticised the OBS coverage during his commentary for the BBC DVD. In addition, the BBC filmed some of the pre-recorded parts of the ceremony. The filming was directed for television by Hamish Hamilton, who described it as "easily the most difficult job of my life".

The BBC released footage of the entire ceremony on 29 October 2012, edited by Danny Boyle and with background extras, filling more than one disc of a five DVD or Blu-ray disc set, which also contained more than seven hours of sporting highlights as well as the complete closing ceremony. A "BBC commentary-free" option for the opening ceremony is available on the DVD, as well as a commentary track by Danny Boyle and Frank Cottrell-Boyce.

== Reception ==
The Times described the ceremony as "a masterpiece", with The Daily Telegraph saying it was "brilliant, breathtaking, bonkers and utterly British". The BBC's chief sports writer Tom Fordyce called it "eccentric" and "tongue-in-cheek", saying "no-one expected ... it would be quite so gloriously daft, so cynicism-squashingly charming and, well, so much pinch-yourself fun." Two weeks after the ceremony Jonathan Freedland of The Guardian wrote that "Boyle's spectacular, so beautifully executed and ingeniously conceived it lingers in the mind even as the closing draws near, stood apart from its predecessors thanks not only to its humour and eccentricity, but also because it had something to say." Writing in The Observer, Jackie Kay commented that "it seemed that Boyle had invented a new kind of opening ceremony, a concept ceremony, one that embraces big ideas as passionately as it does technical flamboyancy". The Stage said that "Danny Boyle's spectacular and moving Olympics Opening Ceremony was undoubtedly the theatrical highlight of 2012".

"Maybe you shouldn't have been able to interpret it that much, because it was about wonder. The theme of the show was to take things that we're very familiar with, and make them seem again wonderful to us: the things that you know about the industrial revolution and the internet, and say 'Aren't these things astonishing, that we live in the middle of?' and to kind of re-polish the pattern of life. So maybe it's alright that you were a little bit bewildered."

— Frank Cottrell-Boyce on the BBC Radio 4 Today programme, 28 July 2012.

Although praise came from across the political spectrum, a few on the British political right were unhappy. Aidan Burley, a Conservative MP, denounced the ceremony on Twitter as "leftie multicultural crap". Burley's comments were dismissed by many fellow Conservatives, including David Cameron and Boris Johnson.

Foreign reaction was overwhelmingly positive. The New York Times said the ceremony was "hilariously quirky ... a wild jumble of the celebratory and the fanciful; the conventional and the eccentric; and the frankly off-the-wall". Forbes called it Boyle's "love song to Britain", while Sports Illustrated noted its political aspects, calling it "a celebration of protest and dissent". The Sydney Morning Herald said it was "an unforgettable start ... at once subversive and sublime" and The Times of India said that "London presented a vibrant picture of Great Britain's rich heritage and culture". The Chinese news agency Xinhua described the ceremony as "dazzling" and an "eccentric and exuberant celebration of British history, art and culture". Chinese artist Ai Weiwei praised the ceremony for its "human touch", saying "In London, they really turned the ceremony into a party ... such a density of information about events and stories and literature and music; about folktales and movies."

Russian President Putin said the ceremony was "wonderful and unforgettable". Dmitry Medvedev said "It was an exceptional spectacle, very well prepared and quite rich ... it succeeded in creating a very British atmosphere ... they managed to find the right language ... to communicate." Panos Samaras of Greece's NET said "it was more like a big musical, a rock opera ... than an Olympics ceremony". French sports newspaper L'Équipe wrote that the ceremony "took the classic from such events and had fun with them", while Le Parisien said it "was magnificent, inventive and offbeat drawing heavily on the roots of British identity". Germany's Die Welt hailed it as "spectacular, glitzy but also provoking and moving".

Chinese news CCTV-4 said the ceremony was a "stunning feast for the eyes". South Korea's Yonhap said it was "by turns dramatic, imaginative, humorous and solemn" and "weaved the story of the country's past, present and future". Singapore's Straits Times said it was a "grand show" noteworthy for both "scale" and "authenticity". The Australian praised a "glorious pandemonium devoted to London's thriving, chaotic energy ... deliberately revelling in the chaos of Britain's free society and popular culture". France's Le Figaro said the ceremony reflected "the best contributions that Britain has given to the world ... its sense of humour, its music, and of course sport". The Canadian Broadcasting Corporation said it was a "rocking, rollicking, sometimes quiet and brooding ceremony". Qatar's The Peninsula said that London did a "spectacular job" making the ceremony a "memorable event".

In an end of the year review, British magazine Q said "It could all have been so different. As the London 2012 Summer Olympics approached, the tide of scepticism seemed almost irreversible. There was the heavy-handed sponsorship, the draconian security, the ticketing problems, the ballooning budget, and the lurking fear that the Opening Ceremony might be, in director Danny Boyle's pungent description, 'shite'. It took less than four hours on the night of Friday 27 July to turn the whole country around. Not only was the ceremony demonstrably not shite, it was the most surprising, moving, spectacular cultural event this country had ever seen...modern Britain, in all its berserk, multi-faceted glory."

The writer of the ceremony, Frank Cottrell-Boyce, said: "People around us thought it might need defending, so I was told to do press the next morning. I was completely surprised [by the positive response]. A lot of people were surprised. But I don't think Danny was surprised. Danny never blinked. At no point did he show any feeling that it was going to be anything but amazing. And he was right."

In December 2012 the culture critic of The Guardian picked the ceremony as "best art event of the year". A British public survey by Samsung voted it the second most inspiring television moment of all time, second only to the 1969 Apollo 11 Moon landing. A Digital Spy survey of more than 25,000 overwhelmingly voted the ceremony as the entertainment highlight of 2012. The ceremony was the second most-mentioned entertainment event on the internet in 2012, with just over six million mentions, coming second to the Grammy Awards. The BBC reported that it was the most requested item from 2012 on its iPlayer on-demand service, with 3.3 million requests.

Boyle was offered a knighthood in late 2012, but turned it down, saying: "I'm very proud to be an equal citizen and I think that's what the Opening Ceremony was actually about."

=== Awards and accolades ===
Award	Category	Recipient(s)	Result	Ref.
Evening Standard Theatre Awards	Beyond Theatre Award	2012 Olympics Opening Ceremony	Won	
Whatsonstage.com Theatre Awards	Theatre Event of the Year	2012 Olympics Opening Ceremony	Won	
NME Awards	Music Moment of the Year	2012 Olympics Opening Ceremony	Won	
Royal Television Society Awards	Judges' Award	Danny Boyle	Won	
Royal Television Society Craft & Design Awards	Design Craft and Innovation	Production Team	Won	
British Academy Television Awards	Best Sport	The London 2012 Summer Olympics Opening Ceremony	Nominated	
British Academy Television Awards	Radio Times Audience Award	The London 2012 Summer Olympics Opening Ceremony	Nominated	
British Academy Television Craft Awards	Best Director: Multi-Camera	Hamish Hamilton and Tapani Parm	Won	
Primetime Creative Arts Emmy Awards	Outstanding Special Class Program	Jim Bell, Molly Solomon, Bucky Gunts, Joe Gesue and Carol Larson	Nominated	
Primetime Creative Arts Emmy Awards	Outstanding Art Direction for Variety or Nonfiction Programming	Mark Tildesley, Suttirat Anne Larlarb, Danny Boyle	Won	
Primetime Creative Arts Emmy Awards	Outstanding Directing for a Variety Special	Bucky Gunts and Hamish Hamilton	Nominated	
Primetime Creative Arts Emmy Awards	Outstanding Lighting Design / Lighting Direction for a Variety Special	Patrick Woodroffe, Adam Bassett, Al Gurdon, Tim Routledge	Nominated	
Primetime Creative Arts Emmy Awards	Outstanding Picture Editing for Short-Form Segments and Variety Specials	Sascha Dhillon (for Segment: "Happy and Glorious")	Nominated	

== Legacy ==
The ceremony was identified by some commentators as precipitating a new mood in the United Kingdom: it "had barely finished before it had become a byword for a new approach, not only to British culture but to Britishness itself. Politicians would soon be referring to it, using it as shorthand for a new kind of patriotism that does not lament a vanished Britain but loves the country that has changed. Boyle's ceremony was hailed from (almost) all sides...for providing a nation that had grown used to mocking its myriad flaws with a new, unfamiliarly positive view of itself ... It was, perhaps, this lack of cynicism that people responded to ... So used to British irony and detachment, it felt refreshing to witness an unembarrassed, positive case for this country. Boyle himself says this was the most important thing he took away from the Olympic experience: "How important it is to believe in something. You might make a fool of yourself and people will go, 'How can you believe in that, you stupid idiot?' But if you believe in something, you carry people with you."

Business leaders also took inspiration from the event, admiring its risk-taking and creative freedom, as well as the trust placed in and loyalty inspired from the workers and volunteers. In February 2013, the BBC's Head of Drama Ben Stephenson told an audience of writers, commissioners and producers that he "wanted them to seek inspiration from the opening ceremony of the London Olympics" which, he said, "had scale and brilliance and, above all, had succeeded not in spite of its Britishness but because of its Britishness, delighting viewers here and around the world by rooting itself in the authentic stories and spirit of these islands." Steve Coogan told Frank Cottrell-Boyce that he felt it was "like the emperor's new clothes in reverse ... it made irony and postmodernism feel tired and past its sell-by date", and Russell T Davies told Boyce: "It changed my idea of the possible."

Reviewing the 2014 Winter Olympics opening ceremony at Sochi, Russia, Owen Gibson of The Guardian observed that with his "complex, intimate snapshot of 'who we were, who we are and who we wish to be'", Boyle "rewrote the rule book for opening ceremonies".

== See also ==
- 2012 Summer Olympics closing ceremony
- 2012 Summer Paralympics opening ceremony, which was also themed on The Tempest
- 2012 Summer Paralympics closing ceremony
