= Isles of Wonder (album) =

Soundtrack album by various artists
- Released: 28 July 2012
- Genre: Pop, rock EDM
- Length: 150:02
- Label: Decca Music Group

London 2012 Olympic Games chronology
Isles of Wonder (2012)	A Symphony of British Music (2012)

Isles of Wonder is the official soundtrack album of the 2012 Summer Olympics opening ceremony. It became available as a download at midnight on 28 July 2012 and as a two-disc CD on 2 August 2012. The soundtrack is mostly pre-recorded and does not include live elements of the performance such as the drumming from Evelyn Glennie, but the two Arctic Monkeys songs are actually credited in the album sleeve as being recorded during the rehearsal at the stadium on 23 July. Its musical direction was performed by Rick Smith from Underworld fame.

Although listed as "Tubular Bells" / "In Dulci Jubilo", Mike Oldfield's track starts with the introduction piece to Tubular Bells in its normal arrangement, followed by a rearranged version of the same theme that during interviews Oldfield called "swingular bells". The piece that was used when the children's literature villains appeared features two arrangements of "Far Above the Clouds" (from Tubular Bells III), and finally there is a rendition of "In Dulci Jubilo" followed by a short coda.

The cover of the CD is a graphic representation of the 'petals' of Thomas Heatherwick's 2012 Summer Olympics and Paralympics cauldron.

== Reception and reviews ==
The London Evening Standard gave the album four stars, commenting "As both a souvenir of one of the great events of our era and a rip-roaring collection, it's hard to fault."

Within two days of release the download album had topped the iTunes album charts in Britain, France, Belgium, The Netherlands and Spain, and reached no. 5 in the United States, as well as reaching no. 2 in the overall British official compilation charts.

Chart (2012)	Position
Australia	44
France	160
New Zealand	35
United Kingdom	2

== Track listing ==
Isles of Wonder – Disc 1 (The Ceremony)
No.	Title	Artist	Length
1.	"I Still Believe"	Frank Turner	3:50
2.	"Jerusalem / Flower of Scotland / Danny Boy / Bread of Heaven"	Four Nations Choirs	3:40
3.	"Nimrod"	LSO on Track	3:31
4.	"And I Will Kiss"	Underworld (ft. Dame Evelyn Glennie)	17:15
5.	"Tubular Bells / In Dulci Jubilo"	Mike Oldfield	11:26
6.	"Chariots of Fire"	London Symphony Orchestra	4:27
7.	"Sundowner"	Blanck Mass & London Symphony Orchestra	3:32
8.	"Bonkers"	Dizzee Rascal & Armand van Helden	2:56
9.	"Nimma Nimma"	A.R. Rahman (ft. Jaspreet Jasz)	4:00
10.	"Heaven"	Emeli Sandé	4:13
11.	"Abide with Me"	Emeli Sandé	4:33
12.	"I Bet You Look Good on the Dancefloor (Live)"	Arctic Monkeys	2:51
13.	"Come Together (Live)"	Arctic Monkeys	3:08
14.	"Caliban's Dream"	Underworld (ft. Dockhead Choir, Dame Evelyn Glennie, Only Men Aloud!, Elizabeth Roberts, Alex Trimble)	7:16

Isles of Wonder – Disc 2 (The Athletes' Parade)
No.	Title	Artist	Length
1.	"Galvanize (Beginning)"	The Chemical Brothers	2:24
2.	"Moon Watcher"	High Contrast	3:18
3.	"Always Loved a Film (Instrumental)"	Underworld	3:04
4.	"Dark & Long (Dark Train)"	Underworld	3:46
5.	"West End Girls"	Pet Shop Boys	2:26
6.	"Minneapolis (High Contrast Remix)"	Underworld	6:12
7.	"Reach"	High Contrast	4:16
8.	"Ghost Dance"	High Contrast	2:40
9.	"Confusion the Waitress (Darren Price & High Contrast Remix)"	Underworld	1:22
10.	"Traktor [radio edit]"	Wretch 32 (ft. L.)	2:05
11.	"Olympians (High Contrast Remix)"	Fuck Buttons	4:57
12.	"Can't Stop This Fire"	High Contrast	4:08
13.	"Moon in Water (Instrumental)"	Underworld	2:42
14.	"Crocodile (High Contrast Remix)"	Underworld	2:40
15.	"Where the Streets Have No Name (High Contrast Remix)"	U2	4:16
16.	"For Years"	High Contrast	3:24
17.	"Dirty Epic (Darren Price & High Contrast Remix)"	Underworld	2:56
18.	"The Long Way Home"	High Contrast	3:16
19.	"Dark and Long (Darren Price & High Contrast Remix)"	Underworld	3:28
20.	"Rez (High Contrast Remix)"	Underworld	6:24
21.	"'Heroes'"	David Bowie	3:18
22.	"Galvanize (Ending)"	The Chemical Brothers	0:38

== See also ==
- “Survival”: the official song for the London 2012 Olympics
- A Symphony of British Music: the official soundtrack album of the London 2012 Olympics closing ceremony.
