= Netsky =

Netsky may refer to:

- Netsky (computer worm)
- Hankus Netsky (born 1955), American klezmer musician
- Netsky (musician) (born 1989), stage name of Boris Daenen, Belgian musician
  - Netsky (album), the musician's self-titled album
