= Jauz discography =

- Jauz performing in 2017
- Studio albums: 1
- EPs: 1
- Singles: 32
- Compilation albums: 1
- Remixes: 29
- Charted singles: 1

This is the discography of American electronic dance music producer and DJ Jauz.

== Studio albums ==
Title	Details	Peak chart positions
Title	Details	BEL
The Wise and the Wicked	Released: August 31, 2018; Label: Bite This!; Formats: Digital download	183

== Compilation albums ==
Title	Details
Off the Deep End, Vol. 1	Released: November 10, 2017; Label: Bite This!; Formats: Digital download

== Extended plays ==
Title	Details
Dangerous Waters	Released: January 17, 2020; Label: Bite This!; Formats: Digital download
Block Party	Released: September 2, 2022; Label: Bite This!, Spinnin' Records; Formats: Digital download

== Charted singles ==
Title	Year	Peak chart positions	Album
Title	Year	BEL	Album
"Higher" (with Netsky)	2016	19	3

== Singles ==
Title	Year	Album
"Proppa Demands" (with At Dawn We Rage)	2014	Non-album singles
"Pure Evil" (with Sullivan King)	2014	Non-album singles
"Feel the Volume"	2014	Non-album singles
"Rock the Party" (with Ephwurd)	2015	Non-album singles
"Get on Up" (with Pegboard Nerds)	2015	Non-album singles
"Squad Out!" (with Skrillex featuring Fatman Scoop)	2015	Non-album singles
"Deeper Love"	2015	Non-album singles
Higher (with Netsky)	2016	3
"Get Down" (with Eptic)	2016	Non-album singles
"Goodiez"	2016	Non-album singles
"Shark Attack" (with Megalodon)	2016	Non-album singles
"Magic" (with Marshmello)	2016	Non-album singles
"Infected" (with Tiësto)	2016	Non-album singles
"Ok!" (with San Holo)	2016	Non-album singles
"Feel the Volume" (JOYRYDE 'Stick It in Reverse' Mix) (with JOYRYDE)	2016	Non-album singles
"Claim to Be"	2017	Off the Deep End, Vol. 1
"The Game"	2017	Off the Deep End, Vol. 1
"I Hold Still" (with Crankdat featuring Slushii)	2017	Off the Deep End, Vol. 1
"Alpha"	2017	Off the Deep End, Vol. 1
"Meant To Love You" (featuring ROUXN)	2017	Non-album singles
"Lights Go Down" (with Zeds Dead)	2017	Non-album singles
"Dinner Chat" (with Yookie and Josh Pan)	2018	Non-album singles
"In The Zone" (featuring Example)	2018	The Wise and the Wicked
"Gassed Up" (with DJ Snake)	2018	The Wise and the Wicked
"Motherfuckers" (featuring Snails)	2018	The Wise and the Wicked
"Keep the Rave Alive" (with Lazer Lazer Lazer)	2018	The Wise and the Wicked
"Diamonds" (with Kiiara)	2018	The Wise and the Wicked
"Super Fly"	2018	The Wise and the Wicked
"Dance Floor" (with Sumr Camp)	2019	Non-album singles
"I Dare You" (with Axel Boy)	2019	Non-album singles
"Don't Leave Me"	2019	This Is Off The Deep End
"Truth" (with I_o)	2019	This Is Off The Deep End
"Thunder" (with Dnmo)	2019	Non-album singles
"Shake" (with Zeds Dead)	2019	Non-album singles
"Movin"	2019	Non-album singles
"Get to Me"	2019	Dangerous Waters
"Erase You" (with Nato Feelz)	2019	Dreamstate EP
"Super Hott" (with Dubloadz)	2019	Dubloadz Presents: Houseloadz Vol. 1
"Bring Em Back" (with Tynan)	2020	Dangerous Waters
"Wildlife" (with Karra)	2020	Non-album single
"No Doubt" (with Griz)	2020	Bangers[6].Zip
"Oceans & Galaxies" (with Haliene)	2021	Non-album singles
"Sick" (with Frank Zummo featuring We Are Pigs)	2021	Non-album singles
"Forever" (with Micah Martin)	2021	Non-album singles
"Make It Good"	2021	Non-album singles
"Bring Et"	2022	Non-album singles
"PPL" (with Johnny GOLD)	2022	Non-album singles
"Like Before" (with Habstrakt)	2022	Block Party
"Mercy" (with Masked Wolf)	2022	Block Party
"S.O.S" (with Zeds Dead and Nicole Millar)	2023	Non-album singles
"What I Wanted"	2023	Non-album singles
"Lights Go Out"	2023	Non-album singles

== Remixes ==
Title	Year	Original artists
"Jack" (Jauz Remix)	2013	Breach
"Ratchet" (Jauz Remix)	2014	Zeds Dead
"All Deez" (Jauz Remix)	2014	Buku
"Duality" (Jauz and Sullivan King Remix)	2014	Slipknot
"Sing" (Jauz Remix)	2014	Ed Sheeran
"The Munsta" (Jauz Remix)	2014	Scndl
"3005" (Jauz Future Remix)	2014	Childish Gambino
"When I Hear Music" (Jauz RetroFuture Remix)	2014	Debbie Deb
"Sugar" (Jauz Remix)	2014	Five Knives
"Coco" (Jauz Remix)	2014	O.T. Genasis
"Jaws Theme" (Jauz Remix)	2014	John Williams
"Tip Toe Wing In My Jawwdinz" (Jauz Remix)	2015	Riff Raff
"Some Chords" (Jauz Remix)	2015	deadmau5 and Dillon Francis
"Jahova" (Jauz Remix)	2015	Rusko
"Regulate" (Jauz Remix)	2015	Warren G featuring Nate Dogg
"Summer Air" (Jauz Remix)	2015	Lema & Shafer featuring Roxanne Emery
"After Life" (Jauz Remix)	2015	Tchami featuring Stacy Barthe
"Lean On" (Dillon Francis and Jauz Remix)	2015	Major Lazer and DJ Snake featuring MØ
"PLUR Police" (Jauz Remix)	2015	Knife Party
"Need U (100%)" (Jauz and Marshmello Remix)	Duke Dumont	
"Gotta Get Thru This" (Jauz RetroFuture Remix)	2016	Daniel Bedingfield
"Final Song" (Jauz and Diplo Remix)	2016	MØ
"Welcome to Planet Urf" (Jauz Remix)	2016	League of Legends
"Propaganda" (Jauz Remix)	2016	DJ Snake
"Closer" (Jauz Remix)	2016	The Chainsmokers featuring Halsey
"Sleepyhead" (Jauz Remix)	2016	Passion Pit
"Language" (Jauz Remix)	2016	Porter Robinson
"One Kiss" (Jauz Remix)	2018	Calvin Harris and Dua Lipa
"Happier" (Jauz Remix)	2018	Marshmello and Bastille
"Baby Shark" (Jauz Remix)	2019	Pinkfong
"Trampoline" (Jauz Remix)	2019	Shaed
"Show Me Love" (Jauz Remix)	2021	Steve Angello and Laidback Luke featuring Robin S.
"I Hope Ur Miserable Until Ur Dead" (Jauz Remix)	2021	Nessa Barrett
