= Hacktivist (band) =

British rap metal band

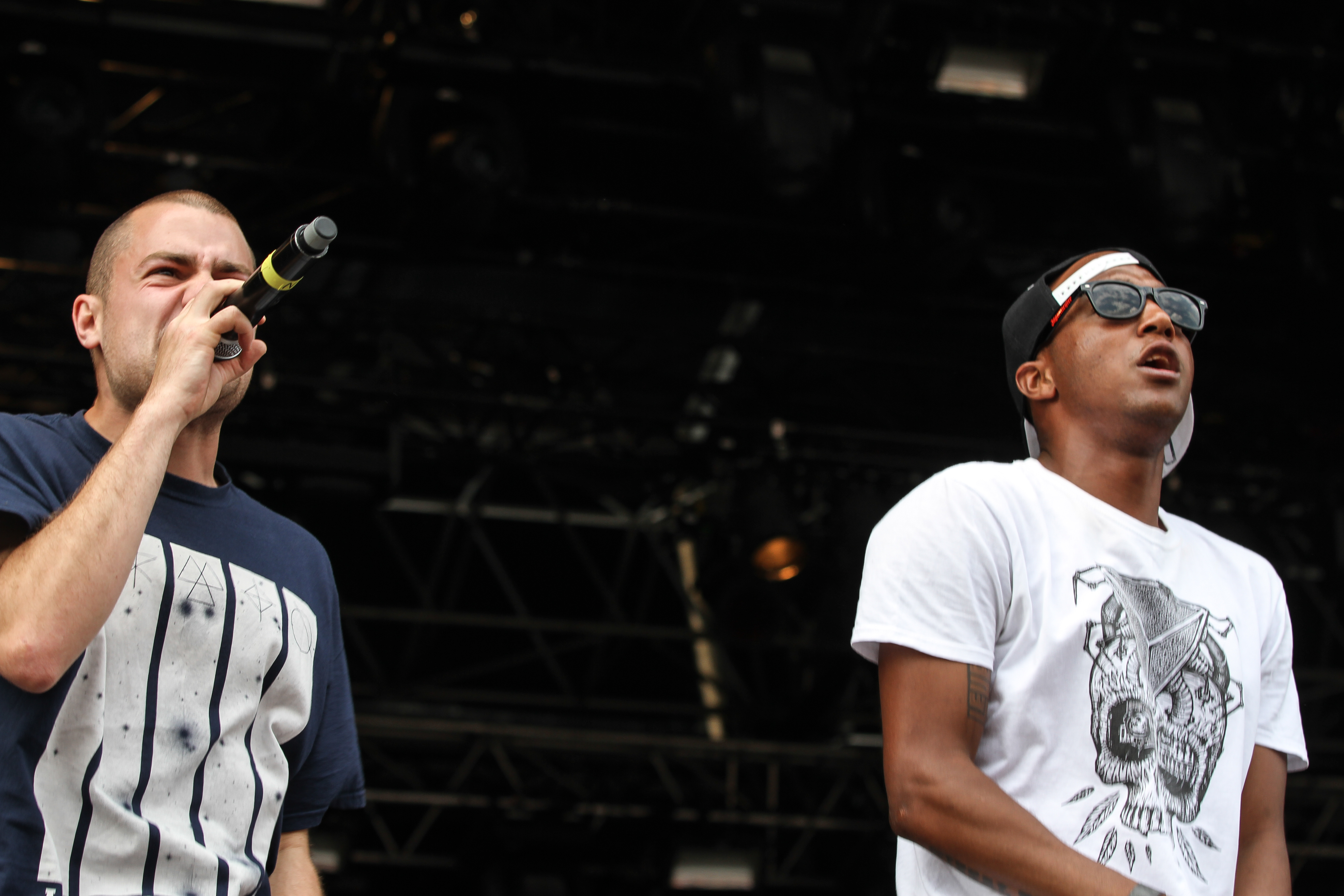
- Ben Marvin and J Hurley at With Full Force 2013

Background information
- Origin: Milton Keynes, Buckinghamshire, England
- Genres: Rap metal; djent; nu metal; grime
- Years active: 2011–present
- Labels: Wake to Reality; PIAS; UNFD; Rise
- Members: Jermaine "J" Hurley; JJ Olifent; Alex Hek; Ste Cole
- Past members: Ben Marvin; Tim "Timfy James" Beazley; Jot Maxi; Josh Gurner; Richard Hawking; James Hewitt
- Website: www.hacktivist.co.uk

Hacktivist are a British rap metal band formed in Milton Keynes, Buckinghamshire, England in 2011. They released a self-titled EP in 2012 followed by their debut studio album, Outside the Box, in 2016. The band's second studio album, Hyperdialect, was released in 2021.

== History ==
Hacktivist began in 2011 when former guitarist Timfy James left his previous band Heart of a Coward. James claims that the formation of Hacktivist was a "fluke", with no intention of developing such a style, but the group was born when peer J Hurley, a local rapper with little history in the metal scene, began recording vocals over some of James' demos. After the demos became very popular online, James decided to recruit a full lineup, bringing in Richard Hawking on drums, Josh Gurner (ex-Sacred Mother Tongue) on bass and Ben Marvin (James's former bandmate in Heart of a Coward) as a second vocalist. In 2012, the band put out a self-titled EP resulting in debut single "Unlike Us" reaching No. 2 on the Amazon UK metal chart within 48 hours. Despite being released independently on 12 November 2012, the band's self-titled EP proved popular in the metal media with Metal Hammer in particular giving the band significant coverage and considerable airplay on BBC Radio 1.

After the release of the Hacktivist EP, the band set out to tour. This included supporting slots for acts such as Enter Shikari and Korn and performances in European festivals such as Sonisphere Festival, Download Festival and Rock am Ring and Rock im Park in summer 2013. In April 2013 the group released a new song "Elevate", with an accompanying video, for free download and was followed up in August with a cover of "Niggas In Paris" (originally by Jay-Z and Kanye West). A video for their cover of "Niggas In Paris" was filmed during their set at Download Festival 2013. They also performed a live session for BBC Radio 1 at Maida Vale Studios.

The band headed out on a UK headline tour throughout winter 2013, supported by The Algorithm. A re-release of their debut EP with four bonus tracks was released on 11 November 2013.

The band has shown support for hacktivism collective Anonymous, and appear to support "whistle-blowers" Edward Snowden and Chelsea Manning whom they reference in the song 'Cold Shoulders'.

On 4 August 2014, Hacktivist released the single and video for "False Idols". Many references to activism (especially hacktivist collective Anonymous) are made throughout the video and within hours the song had reached number 1 on the iTunes Metal chart. This release was followed on 12 November by "Deceive and Defy" (also accompanied by a video), featuring Charlie Holmes of Heart in Hand on vocals. Hacktivist then toured the UK from November to December, supported by Dead Harts and the One Hundred.

Following the release of the single "Buszy" on 17 January 2016, their debut studio album Outside the Box was released on 4 March 2016.

On the 20 January 2017, it was announced that Hacktivist and Ben Marvin were parting ways due to Ben's family commitments, and rapper/vocalist Jot Maxi was brought in as the new co-vocalist. In May, the band released '2 Rotten', a heavier remix of 'Rotten' from Outside the Box, with Jot Maxi taking more of a leading role than he had in the original.

On the 28th of March 2018, it was announced that Hacktivist and Timfy James had parted ways. Following on from this, the band recruited James Hewitt (of bands 'Invocation' and 'Exist Immortal') as their new guitarist and producer with an official announcement made on the 19 January 2019. Hewitt had been playing live and writing new material with the band since June 2018. As a result, Josh Gurner would provide clean vocals following Timfy James' departure.

The band embarked on a headline UK tour in Jan/Feb 2019 and went on to release the single 'Reprogram' with accompanying video on the 10th of April 2019. In 2021, the band released a song titled "Planet Zero" with an accompanying music video from their upcoming album Hyperdialect.

On June 27, 2023, the band announced that co-lead vocalist Jot Maxi would be stepping down from his role in the band. Two days later on June 29, the band announced that former Borders vocalist Jordan 'JJ' Olifent would be joining the band as the new co-lead vocalist, alongside a new single titled 'Rep the H'. The band debuted Olifent live later that day at the final edition of UK Tech-Fest at the Newark Showground.

On March 23, 2025, the band announced that drummer Richard Hawking, guitarist James Hewitt and bassist Josh Gurner would not be continuing with the band, although James has continued providing songwriting, production and mixing services for the band.

On 28th March 2025 Hacktivist announced their new guitarist Alex Hek (former October Ends) and drummer Ste Cole. The band announced this with their new single 'Bones'.

== Musical style ==
Hacktivist's music is a blend of several different styles. They are noted for using eight-string guitars and six-string basses both tuned down to Drop E to achieve an extremely low tuned, distorted and dark sound, as well as ambient passages and a "wall of sound" production style. Their vocals are primarily rapped, although they also make use of conventional singing and occasional harsh vocals. They write their lyrics collectively, focusing on political subjects such as anarchism, conspiracy theories, government corruption, censorship, anti-gun violence, unity against oppression and other social and economic issues.

The band's music has been described as rap metal and grime, as fusing djent and nu metal, or more generally as adding rapping to djent. They have also been said to use elements of groove metal. Their guitar compositions have been described as reminiscent of both Meshuggah and nu metal bands such as Limp Bizkit and Korn.

== Members ==
- Jermaine 'J' Hurley – rapping (2011–present)
- JJ Olifent – rapping, unclean vocals (2023–present)
- Alex Hek – guitars, bass, clean vocals (2025–present)
- Ste Cole – drums (2025–present)

=== Former members ===
- Ben Marvin – rapping, unclean vocals (2011–2017)
- Tim 'Timfy' James – guitars, clean vocals, programming (2011–2018)
- Jot Maxi – rapping, unclean vocals (2017–2023)
- James Hewitt – guitars, programming (2018–2025)
- Josh Gurner – bass (2011–2025), clean vocals (2018–2025)
- Richard Hawking – drums (2011–2025)

== Discography ==
=== Studio albums ===
- Outside the Box (2016, UNFD/Rise Records)
- Hyperdialect (2021, UNFD Records)

=== Extended plays ===
- Hacktivist (2012 self-release, 2013 release under Wake to Reality/PIAS Recordings)
- Over-Throne (2016, UNFD/Rise Records)

=== Singles ===
- "Hacktivist" (2012)
- "Elevate" (2013)
- "Niggas in Paris" (2013, Kanye West and Jay-Z cover)
- "False Idols" (2014)
- "Deceive and Defy" (2014)
- "Buszy" (2016)
- "Taken" (2016)
- "2 Rotten" (2017)
- "Spitfire" (2019, The Prodigy cover)
- "Reprogram" (2019)
- "Dogs of War" (2019)
- "Armoured Core" (2020, featuring Kid Bookie)
- "I Ain't Depressed" (2020, with Dropout Kings)
- "Planet Zero" (2021)
- "Hyperdialect" (2021)
- "Rep the H!" (2023)
- "Crooks and Criminals" (2024)
- "Not Alone" (2024)
- "Ts and Cs" (2024)
- "Bones" (2025)
- "Masquerade" (2025)

=== Compilations ===
- "(Rock) Superstar" (2015, Cypress Hill cover for Rock Sound: Worship and Tributes compilation)
- "Break Stuff" (2016, Limp Bizkit cover for Metal Hammer XXX: Decades of Destruction compilation)
- "Duality" (2019, Slipknot cover for March of the Maggots: A Tribute to Slipknot compilation)

=== Guest appearances ===
- The Qemists – Jungle (Warrior Sound, 2016)

== Videography ==
- From Hacktivist:
  - "Cold Shoulders" (2012)
  - "Unlike Us" (2012)
  - "Hacktivist" (2012)
- "Niggas in Paris" (Kanye West and Jay-Z cover; 2013)
- From Outside the Box:
  - "Elevate" (2013)
  - "False Idols" (2014)
  - "Deceive and Defy" (2014)
  - "Buszy" (2016)
  - "Taken" (2016)
  - "Hate" (2016)
  - "No Way Back" (2016)
- "2 Rotten" (2017)
- "Spitfire" (2019)
- From Hyperdialect:
  - "Reprogram" (2019)
  - "Dogs of War" (2019)
  - "Armoured Core" (featuring Kid Bookie; 2020)
  - "Planet Zero" (2021)
  - "Hyperdialect" (2021)
