= Join the Q =

Studio album by The Qemists
- Released: 2 February 2009
- Genre: Drum and bass, breakbeat, electronic rock
- Length: 47:59
- Label: Ninja Tune
- Producer: The Qemists

The Qemists chronology
Join the Q (2009)	Spirit in the System (2010)

Singles from Join the Q
- 1. "Stompbox" Released: 18 June 2007; 2. "Drop Audio" Released: 12 November 2007; 3. "Dem Na Like Me" Released: 19 January 2008; 4. "On The Run" Released: 30 March 2008; 5. "Lost Weekend" Released: 13 October 2008

Professional ratings
Review scores
Source	Rating
Allmusic	4/5 stars
BBC Music	favourable
Data Transmission	9/10
The List	3/5 stars
Metro	4/5 stars
MusicOMH	4/5 stars
Pitchfork	2.9/10
PopMatters	8/10
URB	2.5/5 stars

Join the Q is the debut studio album from British band the Qemists. The album was released on 2 February 2009 under record label Ninja Tune.

== Track listing ==
Join the Q
No.	Title	Length
1.	"Stompbox"	5:23
2.	"Lost Weekend" (featuring Mike Patton)	4:35
3.	"On the Run" (featuring Jenna G)	5:15
4.	"Dem Na Like Me" (featuring Wiley)	4:37
5.	"S.W.A.G. (Intro)"	2:11
6.	"S.W.A.G." (featuring Zoe Devlin Love)	4:49
7.	"Drop Audio" (featuring I.D.)	5:00
8.	"When Ur Lonely"	6:02
9.	"Soundface" (featuring Beardyman)	1:35
10.	"Got One Life" (featuring MC Navigator)	4:05
11.	"The Perfect High"	5:21
Total length:		47:59

== Personnel ==
The Qemists

- Dan Arnold − bass
- Leon Harris − drums
- Liam Black − guitar

Additional musicians

- Mike Patton − vocals (on "Lost Weekend")
- Jenna G − vocals (on "On the Run")
- Wiley − vocals (on "Dem Na Like Me")
- Zoe Devlin Love − vocals (on "S.W.A.G.")
- I.D. − vocals (on "Drop Audio")
- Beardyman − vocals (on "Soundface")
- MC Navigator − vocals (on "Got One Life")
