= List of number-one albums of 2016 (Belgium) =

The Belgian Albums Chart, divided into the two main regions Flanders and Wallonia, ranks the best-performing albums in Belgium, as compiled by Ultratop.

== Flanders ==
Issue date	Album	Artist	Reference
2 January	10.000 luchtballonnen	K3	
9 January	10.000 luchtballonnen	K3	
16 January	Blackstar	David Bowie	
23 January	Blackstar	David Bowie	
30 January	Blackstar	David Bowie	
6 February	Blackstar	David Bowie	
13 February	10.000 luchtballonnen	K3	
20 February	10.000 luchtballonnen	K3	
27 February	Liefde voor muziek	Various Artists	
5 March	Clouseau danst	Clouseau	
12 March	Puur	Dana Winner	
19 March	Puur	Dana Winner	
26 March	In Wonderland	Hooverphonic	
2 April	Pyjama Days	Bent Van Looy	
9 April	Everything You've Come to Expect	The Last Shadow Puppets	
16 April	Wake Up and Dream	Admiral Freebee	
23 April	What You Need	Goose	
30 April	Lemonade	Beyoncé	
7 May	Lemonade	Beyoncé	
14 May	Lemonade	Beyoncé	
21 May	Lemonade	Beyoncé	
28 May	Lemonade	Beyoncé	
4 June	Lemonade	Beyoncé	
11 June	Seal the Deal & Let's Boogie	Volbeat	
18 June	3	Netsky	
25 June	The Getaway	Red Hot Chili Peppers	
2 July	A Moon Shaped Pool	Radiohead	
9 July	A Moon Shaped Pool	Radiohead	
16 July	Hou me vast	Christoff	
23 July	Hou me vast	Christoff	
30 July	Hou me vast	Christoff	
6 August	Hou me vast	Christoff	
13 August	Lemonade	Beyoncé	
20 August	Het erfgoed van Willy Sommers	Willy Sommers	
27 August	Blonde	Frank Ocean	
3 September	Encore un soir	Celine Dion	
10 September	We Fucked a Flame into Being	Warhaus	
17 September	Skeleton Tree	Nick Cave and the Bad Seeds	
24 September	Skeleton Tree	Nick Cave and the Bad Seeds	
1 October	Skeleton Tree	Nick Cave and the Bad Seeds	
8 October	Echo	Bazart	
15 October	Echo	Bazart	
22 October	Echo	Bazart	
29 October	You Want It Darker	Leonard Cohen	
5 November	You Want It Darker	Leonard Cohen	
12 November	Stan Van Samang	Stan Van Samang	
19 November	Ushuaia	K3	
26 November	Hardwired... to Self-Destruct	Metallica	
3 December	Ushuaia	K3	
10 December	Blue & Lonesome	The Rolling Stones	
17 December	You Want It Darker	Leonard Cohen	
24 December	You Want It Darker	Leonard Cohen	
31 December	You Want It Darker	Leonard Cohen	

== Wallonia ==
Issue date	Album	Artist	Reference
2 January	25	Adele	
9 January	25	Adele	
16 January	Blackstar	David Bowie	
23 January	Blackstar	David Bowie	
30 January	Higher	Alice on the Roof	
6 February	Higher	Alice on the Roof	
13 February	Billet de femme	Pascal Obispo	
20 February	Billet de femme	Pascal Obispo	
27 February	Billet de femme	Pascal Obispo	
5 March	Higher	Alice on the Roof	
12 March	Billet de femme	Pascal Obispo	
19 March	2016 : Au rendez-vous des Enfoirés	Les Enfoirés	
26 March	2016 : Au rendez-vous des Enfoirés	Les Enfoirés	
2 April	2016 : Au rendez-vous des Enfoirés	Les Enfoirés	
9 April	2016 : Au rendez-vous des Enfoirés	Les Enfoirés	
16 April	Renaud	Renaud	
23 April	Renaud	Renaud	
30 April	Colours	Puggy	
7 May	Renaud	Renaud	
14 May	Habana	Florent Pagny	
21 May	L'attrape-rêves	Christophe Maé	
28 May	L'attrape-rêves	Christophe Maé	
4 June	L'attrape-rêves	Christophe Maé	
11 June	L'attrape-rêves	Christophe Maé	
18 June	L'attrape-rêves	Christophe Maé	
25 June	The Getaway	Red Hot Chili Peppers	
2 July	L'attrape-rêves	Christophe Maé	
9 July	L'attrape-rêves	Christophe Maé	
16 July	À bout de rêves	Slimane	
23 July	À bout de rêves	Slimane	
30 July	À bout de rêves	Slimane	
6 August	À bout de rêves	Slimane	
13 August	À bout de rêves	Slimane	
20 August	À bout de rêves	Slimane	
27 August	2 – Tout le bonheur de monde	Kids United	
3 September	Encore un soir	Celine Dion	
10 September	Encore un soir	Celine Dion	
17 September	Encore un soir	Celine Dion	
24 September	Dans la légende	PNL	
1 October	Encore un soir	Celine Dion	
8 October	Encore un soir	Celine Dion	
15 October	Encore un soir	Celine Dion	
22 October	&	Julien Doré	
29 October	My Way	M. Pokora	
5 November	My Way	M. Pokora	
12 November	My Way	M. Pokora	
19 November	You Want It Darker	Leonard Cohen	
26 November	Hardwired... to Self-Destruct	Metallica	
3 December	My Way	M. Pokora	
10 December	Blue & Lonesome	The Rolling Stones	
17 December	Blue & Lonesome	The Rolling Stones	
24 December	Blue & Lonesome	The Rolling Stones	
31 December	My Way	M. Pokora	
