= Rave Digger =

Studio album by Danny Byrd
- Released: 10 October 2010 (digital download); 11 October 2010 (CD, vinyl)
- Recorded: 2009–2010
- Genres: Drum and bass; electronic; dance
- Length: 1:00:18
- Label: Hospital

Danny Byrd chronology
Supersized (2008)	Rave Digger (2010)	Golden Ticket (2013)

Singles from Rave Digger
- 1. "Sweet Harmony" Released: 1 February 2010; 2. "Ill Behaviour" Released: 26 September 2010; 3. "We Can Have It All" Released: 24 October 2010; 4. "Tonight" Released: 6 February 2011

Rave Digger is the second studio album of drum and bass DJ, producer and musician Danny Byrd. It was released through Hospital Records on 10 October 2010 digitally and on 11 October 2010 physically.

== Singles ==
- "Sweet Harmony" was the first single released from the album, it was released on 1 February 2010. It peaked to No. 64 on the UK Singles Chart.
- "Ill Behaviour" was the second single released from the album, it was released on 26 September 2010. It peaked to No. 36 on the UK Singles Chart, making it his first top 40 single in the UK.
- "We Can Have It All" was the third single from the album. It was released on 24 October 2010.
- "Tonight" was the fourth single from the album. It was released on 6 February 2011.

== Track listing ==
No.	Title	Length
1.	"Ill Behaviour" (featuring I-Kay)	4:55
2.	"Judgement Day" (featuring Cyantific and I-Kay)	5:04
3.	"Tonight" (featuring Netsky)	5:43
4.	"Rave TV Part 1" (skit)	1:39
5.	"Hot Fuzz" (featuring Tomahawk)	5:11
6.	"We Can Have It All" (vocals by Victoria Beaumont)	3:47
7.	"Failsafe" (featuring London Elektricity) (vocals by Liane Carroll)	6:03
8.	"Sweet Harmony" (featuring Liquid)	6:04
9.	"Rave TV Part 2" (skit)	0:42
10.	"Planet Earth"	3:41
11.	"Quantum Leap" (featuring Terri Pace)	5:40
12.	"Wait for Me" (featuring Zarif)	5:53
13.	"Amen Alley"	5:57
Total length:		60:18

Special edition
No.	Title	Length
14.	"Moonwalker"	5:19
15.	"Discovery"	6:08
16.	"We Can Have It All" (Sigma remix)	5:37
17.	"Judgement Day" (VIP) (featuring Cyantific and I-Kay)	4:54
18.	"Red Mist" (VIP Part 2) (featuring I-Kay)	5:44
19.	"Tonight" (MJ Cole remix) (featuring Netsky)	6:24
20.	"Tonight" (Cutline remix) (featuring Netsky)	5:13
21.	"Wait for Me" (instrumental) (featuring Zarif)	6:06
Total length:		105:45

Double-vinyl LP
No.	Title	Length
1.	"Judgement Day" (featuring Cyantific and I-Kay)	5:04
2.	"Failsafe" (featuring London Elektricity)	6:03
3.	"Hot Fuzz" (featuring Tomahawk)	5:11
4.	"Amen Alley"	5:57
Total length:		22:15

== In popular media ==
"Judgement Day" and "We Can Have It All" appear on the Codemasters game Dirt 3. Both tracks also appear in the Turn 10 Studios game Forza Motorsport 4.

The song "Ill Behavior" appears in Codemasters' famous F1 2011 game.

== Chart performance ==
Chart (2010)	Peak position
UK Albums (OCC)	68

== Release history ==
Region	Date	Format	Label	Catalogue
United Kingdom	10 October 2010	Digital download	Hospital	B0041EV57S / NHS176CD
United Kingdom	11 October 2010	CD	Hospital	B0041EV57S / NHS176CD
United Kingdom	11 October 2010	2x12" vinyl	Hospital	B0044CO6OG / NHS176LP
United Kingdom	18 February 2011	Digital download (special edition)	Hospital	NHS176DDS
United Kingdom	20 February 2011	Digital download (special edition)	Hospital	NHS176S
