= Sweet Harmony (Liquid song) =

1992 single by Liquid

Single by Liquid

from the album Culture
- Released: March 9, 1992 (original release); 1995 ('95 version); 2004 (2nd re-release); 2007 (3rd re-release)
- Genre: Breakbeat hardcore
- Length: 4:22 (original mix)
- Label: XL Recordings
- Songwriter(s): Model, Ame & Jefferson
- Producer(s): Model & Ame

"Sweet Harmony" is a song by British dance act Liquid, originally released on the Liquid EP in 1991, and as a single in 1992. The song samples heavily from CeCe Rogers' "Someday" released in 1987. New remixes of the song were released in 1995, and it was re-released in 2004 and again in 2007, featuring more new mixes.

In the UK, the original 1992 version peaked at No. 15; the 1995 release at No. 14; and the 2004 release at No. 87.

== Critical reception ==
Upon the 1995 re-release of the song, Sarra Manning from Melody Maker said, "'Sweet Harmony' is a gospel groove sung by angels and I'm off to Ibiza for a spot of foam-dancing." The magazine's Simon Price described it as "boombastic". Tony Marcus from NME wrote, "Liquid's happy rave anthem gets reissued and its cheery beats, CeCe Rogers riff and uplifting sense of fun feel like perfect pop." Another NME editor, Ian McCann, noted that "breakbeat bursts through" the track, "a piano-banging Italo-house tune that doesn't altogether slap its aces on the table although it has been played plenty since it first emerged in 1992." Andrew Diprose from Smash Hits gave it a top score of five out of five, saying, "If there was an award for the most wicked, uplifting bit of piano in a dance track ever, 'Sweet Harmony' would have it sewn up! A massive Rave anthem back in the heady Hardcore days of '92. Liquid "rrrewind and come again" with a revamped, 1995 house style. So... HANDS IN THE AIR!"

== Charts ==
Chart (1992)	Peak position
UK Singles (OCC)	15
UK Dance (Music Week)	1
UK Club Chart (Music Week)	13

Chart (1995)	Peak position
Europe (European Dance Radio)	19
UK Singles (OCC)	14

Chart (2004)	Peak position
UK Singles (OCC)	87

== Certifications ==
Certifications for "Sweet Harmony"
Region	Certification	Certified units/sales
United Kingdom (BPI)	Silver	200,000^{‡}
^{‡} Sales+streaming figures based on certification alone.

== Danny Byrd version ==
"Sweet Harmony"

Single by Danny Byrd featuring Liquid

from the album Rave Digger
- Released: 1 February 2010
- Recorded: 2010
- Genre: Drum and bass
- Length: 6:08
- Label: Hospital
- Songwriter(s): Model, Ame & Jefferson
- Producer(s): Danny Byrd

Danny Byrd singles chronology
"Red Mist" (2009)	"Sweet Harmony" (2010)	"Ill Behaviour" (2010)

English drum and bass DJ and producer Danny Byrd released his version in 2010. It was the first single released from his third album, Rave Digger (2010). The song was released on 1 February 2010 as a digital download and 12". It peaked at number 64 on the UK Singles Chart, making it his first chart entrance.

=== Track listing ===
12" and digital download
No.	Title	Length
1.	"Sweet Harmony"	6:08
2.	"Sweet Harmony" (Jungle Mix)	5:18

=== Chart performance ===
"Sweet Harmony" managed to peak to number 64 on the UK Singles Chart and number six on the UK Dance Singles Chart.

Chart (2010)	Peak position
UK Singles (OCC)	64
UK Dance (OCC)	6

=== Release history ===
Region	Date	Format	Label
United Kingdom	1 February 2010	Digital download	Hospital Records
United Kingdom	1 February 2010	12"	Hospital Records
