= KOAN Sound =

English electronic music production duo

- Origin: Bristol, England
- Genres: Glitch hop; drum and bass; neurofunk; dubstep; IDM; new age
- Years active: 2008–present
- Labels: Shoshin; Owsla; Inspected Records; Open Outlets
- Members: Will Weeks; Jim Bastow
- Website: www.koansound.com

KOAN Sound (/ˈkoʊən/ KOH-ən; named after the word kōan) is an English electronic music production duo from Bristol, consisting of Will Weeks and Jim Bastow.

A track from the Max Out EP is titled "One Hand Clap" – a reference to a well-known kōan with the implied answer of silence. They initially gained recognition as dubstep producers, with earlier popular tracks including "Akira". Some of their many types of music includes glitch hop, neurohop, and Drum & Bass. The duo have since released music on various labels including Inspected Records and Owsla, and have worked with a number of other artists, including producer Asa and singer Ed Sheeran.

== Career ==
The duo cite bands such as Rage Against the Machine and Incubus as early influences. In 2005 the duo began to explore electronic music through artists such as The Prodigy and Noisia.

On 23 May 2011, KOAN Sound released the Max Out EP. The release was seen by many as a turning point in their production, gradually moving away from the dubstep template of their earlier music and displaying a wider range of styles.

On 1 November 2011, the duo released the Funk Blaster EP on Skrillex's label Owsla. The EP reached number 1 in the Beatport releases category.

During 2012, KOAN Sound performed across Europe and North America. They supported Skrillex alongside Diplo and others on the Full Flex Express Tour in 2012.

On 4 September 2012, The Adventures of Mr. Fox EP was released. The release includes remixes from Reso, Neosignal and Opiuo. A remix of "Introvert" by Vexisle, a duo of KOAN Sound's frequent collaborator Asa and Kursa, was released soon after as a free download. The EP track "80s Fitness" (music video by director Tim Hendrix and producer Filippo Nesci) featured on an advert for The Radio 1 Breakfast Show with Nick Grimshaw and received airplay on BBC Radio 1 and 1Xtra. Their songs have been played by Skream and Benga, MistaJam and Annie Nightingale among others, and they completed a Daily Dose: OWSLA After Dark mix for MistaJam.

On 22 October 2013, the duo's collaboration EP with Asa, Sanctuary, was released through OWSLA and Inspected. This was considered to be another turning point in their production, where they began to incorporate more orchestral, organic and ethereal elements in their music, as well as releasing various tracks that sounded almost completely acoustic.

Their fourth OWSLA release, the Dynasty EP, was released on 1 April 2014. One of the four tracks, "7th Dimension", entered the UK Indie Breakers Chart at number 12.

Their fifth release, Forgotten Myths, was released in 2015 through Culprate's Open Outlets label and Shoshin.

Their sixth release, an album titled Polychrome, was announced on 1 November 2018 and released on 7 December 2018.

On 20 September 2019, they became a featured artist on the rhythm game osu!.

== Discography ==
=== Albums ===
Year	Release	Label
2018	Polychrome	Shoshin
2023	Led by Ancient Light	Shoshin

=== Extended plays ===
Year	Release	Label
2011	Free	Self-released
2011	Max Out	Inspected Records
2011	Funk Blaster	Owsla
2012	The Adventures of Mr. Fox	Owsla
2013	Sanctuary (with Asa)	Owsla / Inspected Records
2014	Dynasty	Owsla
2015	Forgotten Myths	Shoshin
2019	Intervals Above	Shoshin
2020	Silk Wave	Shoshin
2021	Chronos	Vision
2021	Full Circle	Shoshin
2024	Evocation	Shoshin
2025	Glyph	Shoshin
2025	Echoes	Shoshin
2025	Spiral Unfold	Shoshin
2026	Moments of Opening	Shoshin

=== Singles ===
Year	Title	Label
2008	"Clowny / Blessed"	Abducted Dub
2009	"Boo & Yarr (by TRiLLBASS) / Mafia (TRiLLBASS Remix) / Alchemy"	TRiLLBASS
2010	"Coast To Coast / Hesitation (featuring Asa)"	Screwloose Records
2010	"Jumpsuit Adventures / Blueberry Pie"	Screwloose Records
2011	"Akira / Endorphin"	Screwloose Records
2011	"Garden of Buddha / Zappa Bomb Squad"	Dubsaw
2012	"Risky Endeavours"	Unsigned
2018	"Chilli Daddy"	Shoshin
2018	"Viridian Dream"	Shoshin
2020	"Virtue"	Shoshin
2021	"Chronos"	Vision

=== Other appearances ===
Year	Track	Release	Label
2008	"Mafia"	TRiLLDigi 002	TRiLLBASS
2011	"Kaneda" (with Asa)	Sweeter Things EP	Screwloose Records
2011	"Blue Stripes"	Dubstep Onslaught	EMI
2012	"Look Who's Back" (featuring Foreign Beggars)	OWSLA Presents: Free Treats Vol. II	Owsla
2012	"Beyond the Shadows" (with Gemini, Culprate and Asa)	Beyond the Shadows	Inspected Records
2013	"Cascade" (with Culprate, Asa and Reso)	Cascade	Inspected Records
2014	"Mosaic" (with Culprate, Asa and Sorrow)	Mosaic	Inspected Records
2015	"If You Hadn't" (with Culprate, Asa and Opiuo)	If You Hadn't	Inspected Records

=== Remixes ===
Year	Track	Artist
2009	Catch You	Asa
2010	We Can Have It All	Danny Byrd
2011	This City (with Asa)	Kito and Reija Lee
2011	Raw Tones (with Asa)	Gatekeeper
2011	Promises	Andain
2011	The A Team	Ed Sheeran
2011	Keep Rising	LoKo
2011	Kill Everybody	Skrillex
2011	Deal With It	Kill The Noise
2012	Days Are Forgotten	Kasabian
2012	Green and Blue	Neil Davidge
2012	Vengeance Rhythm	Two Fingers
2013	Axion	Reso
2014	Life	Opiuo (featuring Gift of Gab and Syreneiscreamy)
2019	Meanwhile, In The Future	KOAN Sound
2021	Distance	Apashe (featuring Geoffroy)
2021	Reflex Angle	Hudson Lee and Frequent
