= Moving with You =

Single by Netsky featuring Jenna G

from the album Netsky
- Released: 16 August 2010
- Recorded: 2010
- Genre: Dance; drum and bass
- Length: 5:13
- Label: Hospital
- Songwriters: Jenna Gibbons; Boris Daenen
- Producer: Boris Daenen

Netsky singles chronology
"Your Way / Daydreaming" (2010)	"Moving with You" (2010)	"Tonight" (2011)

"Moving with You" is a song by Belgian drum and bass producer Netsky, from his debut album Netsky. The song was released on 16 January 2012 as a digital download in the United Kingdom and Belgium. The song features vocals from Jenna G.

== Music video ==
A music video to accompany the release of "Moving With You" was first released onto YouTube on 23 July 2010 at a total length of three minutes and fifty-one seconds. It has received over 900,000 views as of March 2016.

== Track listings ==
Digital download
No.	Title	Length
1.	"Moving With You" (feat. Jenna G)	5:13
2.	"Pirate Bay"	5:38
3.	"Escape VIP" (feat. Darrison)	6:01
4.	"Moving With You" (Die, Interface & William Cartwright Remix)	4:58

== Credits and personnel ==
- Lead vocals – Jenna G
- Producers – Boris Daenen
- Lyrics – Jenna Gibbons, Boris Daenen
- Label: Hospital Records

== Chart performance ==
Chart (2010)	Peak position
Belgium (Ultratip Bubbling Under Flanders)	14

== Release history ==
Region	Date	Format	Label
Belgium	16 August 2010	Digital download	Hospital Records
United Kingdom	16 August 2010	Digital download	Hospital Records
