= Spirit in the System =

Studio album by The Qemists
- Released: 7 July 2010
- Recorded: 12A Studios, Brighton, 2009 – May 2010
- Genre: Big beat, drum and bass, electronica, electronic rock
- Length: 43:51
- Label: Ninja Tune
- Producer: The Qemists

The Qemists chronology
Join the Q (2009)	Spirit in the System (2010)	Warrior Sound (2016)

Singles from Spirit in the System
- 1. "Your Revolution" Released: 3 May 2010; 2. "Hurt Less" Released: 19 July 2010; 3. "Renegade" Released: 30 August 2010; 4. "Take It Back" Released: 4 April 2011

Professional ratings
Review scores
Source	Rating
Allmusic	3.5/5 stars
Artrocker	3/5 stars
BBC Music	mixed
Clash	7/10
Data Transmission	8/10
Future Entertainment	8/10
Rock Sound	7/10
The Skinny	2/5 stars

Spirit in the System is the second studio album from British band The Qemists. The album was released on 7 July 2010 under record label Ninja Tune. On 26 May 2010, the band announced the album was complete. The album artwork was created by Glenn Fabry.

On 14 June 2012, the band announced they had completed the music video for the single "Hurt Less" featuring Jenna G. The video was directed by Keith McCarthy.

== Track list ==
No.	Title	Length
1.	"Take It Back" (featuring Enter Shikari)	4:20
2.	"Hurt Less" (featuring Jenna G)	5:12
3.	"Dirty Words" (featuring Matt Rose & Bruno Balanta)	3:38
4.	"Renegade" (featuring Maxsta & MC I.D.)	3:41
5.	"Fading Halo" (featuring Chantal Brown)	4:53
6.	"The Only Love Song" (featuring MC I.D.)	4:54
7.	"Life's Too Short" (featuring Chantal Brown)	3:33
8.	"Apocalypse" (featuring Robin Hawkins)	4:28
9.	"Bones" (featuring Kellermensch)	4:12
10.	"Your Revolution" (featuring Matt Rose)	5:00
Total length:		43:51

== Personnel ==
The Qemists

- Dan Arnold – bass, synths
- Leon Harris – drums
- Liam Black – guitar, synths

Additional musicians

- Rou Reynolds – vocals (on "Take It Back")
- Rory Clewlow – guitar (on "Take It Back")
- Jenna G – vocals (on "Hurt Less")
- Matt Rose – vocals (on "Dirty Words" and "Your Revolution")
- Bruno Balanta – vocals (on "Dirty Words")
- Maxsta – vocals (on "Renegade")
- Chantal Brown – vocals (on "Fading Halo" and "Life's Too Short")
- MC I.D. – vocals (on "Renegade" and "The Only Love Song")
- Robin Hawkins – vocals (on "Apocalypse")
- Sebastian Wolff – vocals (on "Bones")
- Michael Salmon – piano

Technical personnel

- The Qemists – production, engineering
- Harry Barnard – additional production (on "Take It Back" and "Renegade")
- Kellermensch – additional production (on "Bones")
- Beau Thomas – mastering
- Jack Noel – design
- Glenn Fabry – cover image

== Release history ==
Region	Date	Label	Format	Catalog
Japan	7 July 2010	Ninja Tune	CD	BRC-265
Europe	16 August 2010	Ninja Tune	CD	ZENCD159
Europe	16 August 2010	Ninja Tune	3× LP	ZEN159
Europe	16 August 2010	Ninja Tune	Digital MP3	ZENDNL159
Europe	16 August 2010	Ninja Tune	Digital WAV	ZENDNL159W
North America	24 August 2010	Ninja Tune	CD	ZENCD159
North America	24 August 2010	Ninja Tune	3× LP	ZEN159
North America	24 August 2010	Ninja Tune	Digital MP3	ZENDNL159
North America	24 August 2010	Ninja Tune	Digital WAV	ZENDNL159W
