= Golden Ticket (Danny Byrd album) =

Studio album by Danny Byrd
- Released: 24 June 2013
- Recorded: 2012–2013
- Genre: Drum and bass, UK garage
- Length: 1:08:18
- Label: Hospital Records

Danny Byrd albums chronology
Rave Digger (2010)	Golden Ticket (2013)	Atomic Funk (2018)

Singles from Golden Ticket
- 1. "Grit" / "Love You Like This" Released: 21 January 2013; 2. "4th Dimension" / "Bad Boy (Back Again)" Released: 20 May 2013

Golden Ticket is the third studio album of DJ/producer and musician Danny Byrd. It was released on 24 June 2013 through Hospital Records.

In the album, Danny Byrd explores UK garage while keeping his familiar drum & bass style. The album was intended to be "a bit more edgy/urban" compared to the all-liquid sound of Supersized and the rave sound of Rave Digger. The album has managed to chart at No. 181 in the UK.

== Track listing ==
No.	Title	Length
1.	"4th Dimension"	4:47
2.	"Bad Boy (Back Again)"	4:53
3.	"Get on It" (featuring Brookes Brothers)	4:05
4.	"In the Street" (skit)	0:31
5.	"Bad Monday" (featuring Tanya Lacey)	4:30
6.	"Throw Ya Hands"	5:13
7.	"Battle" (featuring Mz Bratt)	4:04
8.	"Make It Weighty" (featuring Serocee)	3:45
9.	"Love You Like This"	4:27
10.	"BANG!" (featuring Jaguar Skills)	5:01
11.	"Touchline" (featuring Serocee)	4:56
12.	"U Turn"	5:46
13.	"JFK (Holy Mackerel)"	5:37
14.	"Like a Byrd" (featuring Saint Louis)	4:59
15.	"In the Factory" (skit)	0:36
16.	"Golden Ticket" (featuring Tanya Lacey)	5:08
Total length:		68:18

Special Edition
No.	Title	Length
17.	"New Day" (featuring Xavier)	4:44
18.	"Break Free"	5:02
19.	"Grit" (featuring Roni Size)	5:05
20.	"Sublow Junkie" (featuring Rhymestar)	4:25
21.	"Ill Behaviour" (VIP) (featuring I-Kay)	5:11
22.	"Golden Ticket" (Album DJ Mix)	46:09
Total length:		138:54

2 x 12" (Double-vinyl EP)
No.	Title	Length
1.	"Get on It" (featuring Brookes Brothers)	4:05
2.	"Make It Weighty" (featuring Serocee)	3:45
3.	"BANG!" (featuring Jaguar Skills)	5:01
4.	"Golden Ticket" (Instrumental)	4:44
Total length:		17:35

Sample credits

- "4th Dimension" samples "Intergalactic" by Beastie Boys
- "Love You Like This" samples "In Love With You" by The Paradise (Alan Braxe and Romauld)

=== Garage remixes ===
The garage remixes of Golden Ticket were released later near the end of the year on 2 December 2013.

The drum and bass tracks "Get on It" and "Make It Weighty" were remixed by MC Majestic and Wookie, respectively, and the garage tracks "New Day" and "Touchline" were given dub mixes from Danny Byrd himself.

No.	Title	Length
1.	"Get on It" (Majestic Remix) (featuring Brookes Brothers)	6:03
2.	"Make It Weighty" (Wookie Remix) (featuring Serocee)	5:08
3.	"New Day" (Dub Mix) (featuring Xavier)	4:19
4.	"Touchline" (Dub Mix) (featuring Serocee)	4:38
Total length:		20:08

== Chart performance ==
Chart (2013)	Peak Position
UK Albums (OCC)	181

== Release history ==
Region	Label	Date	Type	Catalogue	Format
United Kingdom	Hospital Records	24 June 2013	Standard	NHS234/NHS234EP	Vinyl
United Kingdom	Hospital Records	24 June 2013	Standard	NHS234/NHS234CD	CD
United Kingdom	Hospital Records	24 June 2013	Standard	NHS234/NHS234DD	Digital Download
United Kingdom	Hospital Records	24 June 2013	Special Edition	NHS234S/NHS234DDS	Digital Download
United Kingdom	Hospital Records	2 December 2013	Garage Remixes	NHS244/NHS244DD	Digital Download
