= Ill Behaviour =

Single by Danny Byrd featuring I-Kay

from the album Rave Digger
- B-side: "Moonwalker"
- Released: 26 September 2010
- Recorded: 2010
- Genre: Drum and bass
- Length: 3:32
- Label: Hospital
- Songwriter(s): Danny Byrd

Danny Byrd singles chronology
"Sweet Harmony" (2010)	"Ill Behaviour" (2010)	"We Can Have It All" (2010)

"Ill Behaviour" is a song by British drum and bass DJ, producer, and musician Danny Byrd. It is the second single released from his third album, Rave Digger. The song was released on 26 September 2010 for digital download and on 27 September 2010 for 12". The song, whose lyrics are based on "One For The Trouble" by A.D.O.R., features the voice of singer-songwriter I-Kay from Bristol, who has worked on several Danny Byrd track releases. "III Behaviour" was supported by MistaJam, Annie Mac, and Sara Cox on BBC Radio 1. The single was promoted to BBC Radio 1 A-list status on 8 September 2010. The single entered the UK Singles Chart at number 36, Byrd's first top-40 single. It is featured as a soundtrack to the video game F1 2011.

== Critical reception ==
Fraser McAlpine of BBC Chart Blog gave the song a positive review stating:

Oh HELLO! This is a bit more like it.

Clearly the world of drum and bass is a broad church. There is room for doomy, scary things, there is room for bright, sparkly things, and there is room for lively, geezerish things. If I had to express a preference - and let's be clear, this is a REVIEW on a BLOG, that's opinion times personal equals probably won't see things the way everyone else does - it would be for the sparkly/geezer end of things, rather than the doomy/scary.

And this is because, for me, dancing is not about pulling an angry face. It's about letting all that stuff go, and surrendering to the healing, improving qualities of dynamic, uplifting music. It's about sound pummelling the base of my neck like a masseur, beating the cares of the world out and lifting me up and out of the mire.

Throw in a bunch of stuff about pestilence and horror, and I'm back to worrying again..

== Track listings ==
12"
No.	Title	Length
1.	"Ill Behaviour" (feat. I-Kay)	3:32
2.	"Moonwalker"	5:19

Digital download
No.	Title	Length
1.	"Ill Behaviour" (feat. I-Kay; radio edit)	3:32
2.	"Ill Behaviour" (feat. I-Kay)	5:55
3.	"Moonwalker"	5:19

== Chart performance ==
=== For "Ill Behaviour" ===
Chart	Peak position
UK Dance (OCC)	7
UK Singles (OCC)	36

=== For "Moonwalker" ===
Chart	Peak position
UK Dance (OCC)	27

== Release history ==
Region	Date	Format	Label
United Kingdom	26 September 2010	Digital download	Hospital Records
United Kingdom	27 September 2010	12"	Hospital Records
