= Come Alive (Netsky song) =

Single by Netsky

from the album 2
- Released: 21 May 2012
- Recorded: 2011
- Genre: Drum and bass, drumstep
- Length: 4:10
- Label: Hospital Records
- Songwriter: Boris Daenen
- Producer: Boris Daenen

Netsky singles chronology
"Give & Take" (2012)	"Come Alive" (2012)	"Love Has Gone" (2012)

"Come Alive" is a song by Belgian drum and bass producer Netsky. The song was released on 21 May 2012 as a digital download in the United Kingdom from his second album 2. The single peaked at number 150 on the UK Singles Chart, number 24 on the UK Dance Chart and number 17 on the UK Indie Chart. The song was written and produced by Boris Daenen and features vocals from Scarlett Quinn.

== Music video ==
A music video to accompany the release of "Come Alive" was first released onto YouTube on May 3, 2012 at a total length of three minutes and ten seconds.

== Track listings ==
Digital download
No.	Title	Length
1.	"Come Alive" (Radio Edit)	3:02
2.	"Come Alive"	4:10
3.	"Come Alive" (Culture Shock Remix)	5:08
4.	"Come Alive" (Rockwell Remix)	5:38
5.	"Come Alive" (Submerse Remix)	4:29

== Chart performance ==
Chart (2012)	Peak position
Austria (Ö3 Austria Top 40)	35
Belgium (Ultratop 50 Flanders)	10
Belgium Dance (Ultratop Flanders)	2
Belgium Airplay (Ultratop Flanders)	21
Belgium (Ultratip Bubbling Under Flanders)	1
Germany (GfK)	75
UK Dance (OCC)	24
UK Indie (OCC)	17
UK Singles (Official Charts Company)	150

== Certifications ==
Region	Certification	Certified units/sales
New Zealand (RMNZ)	Gold	15,000^{‡}
^{‡} Sales+streaming figures based on certification alone.

== Release history ==
Region	Date	Format	Label
United Kingdom	21 May 2012	Digital download	Hospital Records
