= Outside the Box (Hacktivist album) =

Studio album by Hacktivist
- Released: 4 March 2016
- Recorded: 2013–2016
- Genre: Rap metal; djent; nu metal; grime
- Length: 40:19
- Label: UNFD, Rise Records

Hacktivist chronology
| Hacktivist (2012) | Outside the Box (2016) | Over-Throne EP (2016) |

Singles from Outside the Box
- 1. "Elevate" Released: 2 April 2013; 2. "False Idols" Released: 4 August 2014; 3. "Deceive and Defy" Released: 12 November 2014; 4. "Buszy" Released: 18 January 2016; 5. "Taken" Released: 28 February 2016

Outside the Box is the debut studio album by British rap metal band Hacktivist. It was released on 4 March 2016 through UNFD and Rise Records.

Music videos for the songs "Elevate", "False Idols", "Deceive and Defy", "Buszy" and "Taken" were released in support of the album. The album version of "Deceive and Defy" contains new vocals by Josh Graham of Heart of a Coward, after accusations of sexual misconduct were raised against Charlie Holmes, who had previously contributed vocals to the song on the single release.

On 1 March 2016, a playlist of the full album was uploaded to YouTube through Hacktivist's label UNFD.

== Reception ==
The album generally received positive reviews, one of which described the album as "their best work yet".

Professional ratings
Review scores
| Source | Rating |
|---|---|
| The Monolith | Unfavourable |
| New Noise Magazine | 4/5 stars |
| Backseat Mafia | 8/10 |
| Ramzine.co.uk | 2.5/5 stars |
| All Things Loud | 8/10 |
| Distorted Sound Magazine | 6/10 |

== Track listing ==
| No. | Title | Length |
|---|---|---|
| 1. | "Our Time" (featuring Marlon Hurley) | 2:04 |
| 2. | "Hate" | 3:16 |
| 3. | "Deceive and Defy" (featuring Jamie Graham of Heart of a Coward) | 3:18 |
| 4. | "Taken" (featuring Rou Reynolds of Enter Shikari) | 3:31 |
| 5. | "The Storm" | 2:12 |
| 6. | "No Way Back" | 3:40 |
| 7. | "False Idols" | 3:23 |
| 8. | "Rotten" (featuring Astroid Boys & Jot Maxi) | 4:05 |
| 9. | "Elevate" | 3:40 |
| 10. | "Outside the Box" | 4:18 |
| 11. | "Buszy" | 3:49 |
| 12. | "The Storm II" | 2:59 |
| Total length: | | 40:19 |

== Personnel ==
- Jermaine "J" Hurley – rapped vocals
- Ben Marvin – rapped vocals, unclean vocals
- Tim "Timfy" James Beazley – guitars, clean vocals, programming
- Josh Gurner – bass
- Richard Hawking – drums

== Trivia ==
The song "Buszy" is a reference to the world famous skate plaza The Buszy in Milton Keynes where J would skateboard and perform at jams and events, often by freestyle rapping.
