= Filippo Nesci =

American film producer

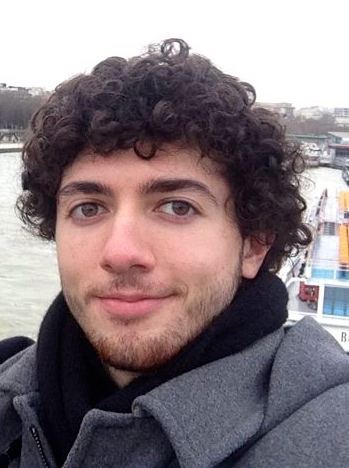
- Born: Filippo Arturo Nesci; 22 January 1993 (age 33); Rome, Lazio, Italy
- Education: Art Center College of Design

Filippo Arturo Nesci (born 22 January 1993) is an Italian multimedia artist and producer.

== Biography ==
Nesci was born in Rome, graduated with honors from the Art Center College of Design of Pasadena, California, and currently lives in Los Angeles. He contributed to the invention of Multimedia Psychotherapy by his father Domenico A. Nesci, a psychoanalyst in Rome and Toronto.

Nesci was producer of the following short films: Martha (director: Sam Benenati, score: James Vincent McMorrow), Snippets of Wally Watkins (director: Kevin Lin, 2014), Lineman (director: Eugene Weiss, 2013), Wrecks & Violins (director: Kevin Lin, 2012), The Carnival is on Fire (director: Ryan McDonald, 2012). He also produced music videos for the songs 80’s Fitness (KOAN Sound) and Monster (Meg Myers) as well as several commercials.
