= Netsky (album) =

Studio album by Netsky
- Released: 31 May 2010
- Recorded: 2009–2010
- Genres: Drum and bass; liquid funk
- Length: 70:59
- Label: Hospital
- Producer: Netsky

Netsky chronology
| Netsky (2010) | 2 (2012) |

Singles from Netsky
- 1. "Moving with You" Released: 16 August 2010

Netsky is the eponymous debut album from Belgian drum and bass musician Netsky. The album primarily features drum and bass tracks, with various vocalists such as Darrison and Jenna G. It was leaked in early May, a month before the intended mid-June release. The release, however, was brought forward to 31 May 2010.

== Track listing ==
Standard edition
| No. | Title | Writer(s) | Length |
|---|---|---|---|
| 1. | "Escape" (featuring MC Darrison) | Boris Daenen; Daniel Harrison | 5:58 |
| 2. | "Iron Heart" | Daenen | 5:56 |
| 3. | "Moving with You" (featuring Jenna G) | Daenen; Jenna Gibbons | 5:15 |
| 4. | "Secret Agent" | Daenen | 5:35 |
| 5. | "Mellow" (featuring Terri Pace) | Daenen; Shahin Moshirian; Michael Simon; Stephen Browarczyk | 4:41 |
| 6. | "I Can't Hold It" | Daenen | 3:57 |
| 7. | "Storm Clouds" | Daenen | 5:42 |
| 8. | "Gravity" | Daenen | 4:29 |
| 9. | "Let's Leave Tomorrow" (featuring Bev Lee Harling) | Daenen; Beverley Harling | 4:35 |
| 10. | "Rise and Shine" | Daenen | 4:50 |
| 11. | "The Magic Russian Bottle" | Daenen | 4:48 |
| 12. | "Endless Search" | Daenen; Cybil Lynch; Sean Stafford Spencer; Gary C. Hudgins; Gary Ahrens; Thomas Davis | 4:16 |
| 13. | "Lost Without You" | Daenen | 5:18 |
| 14. | "Pirate Bay" | Daenen | 5:39 |

Digital bonus track
| No. | Title | Writer(s) | Length |
|---|---|---|---|
| 15. | "Porcelain" | Daenen | 4:34 |

iTunes Store bonus track
| No. | Title | Length |
|---|---|---|
| 16. | "Netsky (Continuous Album Mix) (iTunes exclusive)" | 32:31 |

Vinyl edition
| No. | Title | Length |
|---|---|---|
| 1. | "Escape" (featuring MC Darrison) | 5:58 |
| 2. | "Mellow" (featuring Terri Pace) | 4:41 |
| 3. | "Iron Heart" | 5:56 |
| 4. | "Let's Leave Tomorrow" (featuring Bev Lee Harling) | 4:35 |
| 5. | "Secret Agent" | 5:35 |
| 6. | "Gravity" | 4:29 |
| 7. | "The Magic Russian Bottle" | 4:48 |
| 8. | "Storm Clouds" | 5:42 |

Sample credits

- "Mellow" contains samples of "Have You Ever", written and performed by Shahin Moshirian, Michael Simon and Stephan Browarczyk.
- "Endless Search" contains samples of "Don't Give Up" written by Cybil Lynch, Sean Stafford Spencer, Gary C. Hudgins, Gary Ahrens and Thomas Davis and performed by Sybil.

== Charts ==
| Chart (2010–2013) | Peak position |
|---|---|
| Belgian Albums (Ultratop Flanders) | 24 |
| Belgian Alternative Albums (Ultratop Flanders) | 15 |
| Belgian Heatseekers (Ultratop Flanders) | 4 |
| Belgian Mid-price Albums (Ultratop Flanders) | 10 |
| Belgian National Albums (Ultratop Flanders) | 6 |
| Belgian Albums (Ultratop Wallonia) | 166 |
| Belgian Heatseekers (Ultratop Wallonia) | 12 |
| Belgian National Albums (Ultratop Wallonia) | 18 |
| UK Dance Albums (Official Charts) | 10 |
| UK Independent Albums (Official Charts) | 25 |

=== Year-end charts ===
| Chart (2012) | Position |
|---|---|
| Belgian Albums Chart (Flanders) | 90 |
