= Warrior Sound =

Studio album by The Qemists
- Released: 4 March 2016
- Genre: Drum and bass, breakbeat, electronic rock
- Label: Amazing Record
- Producer: The Qemists

The Qemists chronology
Spirit in the System (2010)	Warrior Sound (2016)

Singles from Warrior Sound
- 1. "No More" Released: 21 October 2013; 2. "Run You" Released: 15 January 2016

Warrior Sound is the third studio album from British drum and bass band The Qemists. It was released on March 4, 2016 through record label Amazing Record.

"No More" is the first single from the album, released in November 2013. "Run You" is the second single from the album, released on 15 January 2016.

== Track listing ==
No.	Title	Length
1.	"Our World"	0:57
2.	"Jungle" (featuring Hacktivist)	3:34
3.	"Run You"	4:20
4.	"Anger" (featuring Kenta Koie of Crossfaith)	4:27
5.	"New Design"	3:54
6.	"No More"	4:07
7.	"Push the Line" (featuring Charlie Rhymes)	3:54
8.	"We Are the Problem"	3:48
9.	"Let It Burn"	3:26
10.	"Warrior Sound"	3:53
11.	"No Respect" (featuring Ghetts)	4:41
12.	"Requiem"	4:14

== Track listing (Japanese Limited Edition) ==
No.	Title	Length
13.	"Lick the Lid"	3:56
