= We Can Have It All =

Single by Danny Byrd

from the album Rave Digger
- A-side: "We Can Have It All" (Sigma Remix)
- B-side: "Planet Earth"
- Released: 24 October 2010
- Recorded: 2010
- Genre: Breakbeat hardcore
- Length: 3:47
- Label: Hospital
- Songwriter(s): Danny Byrd

Danny Byrd singles chronology
"Ill Behaviour" (2008)	"We Can Have It All" (2010)	"Tonight" (2011)

"We Can Have It All" is a song by British DJ and record producer Danny Byrd, featuring Tori Beaumont. It is the third single released from his third studio album Rave Digger. The song was released on 24 October 2010 as a digital download and 12" vinyl on 22 November 2010. The single debuted at number 22 on the UK Dance Chart and later at number 144 on the UK Singles Chart.

== Track listings ==
Digital download
No.	Title	Length
1.	"We Can Have It All"	3:47
2.	"We Can Have It All" (Instrumental)	3:48
3.	"We Can Have It All" (Sigma Remix)	5:38
4.	"We Can Have It All" (KOAN Sound Remix)	4:41
5.	"Ill Behaviour" (Barbarix Remix) (featuring I-Kay)	5:12

12" vinyl
No.	Title	Length
1.	"We Can Have It All" (Sigma Remix)	3:47
2.	"Planet Earth"	3:41

== Chart performance ==
Chart	Peak position
UK Dance (OCC)	22
UK Singles (Official Charts Company)	144

== Release history ==
Region	Date	Format	Label	Catalogue
United Kingdom	24 October 2010	12"	Hospital	B0046CBITU / NHS177
United Kingdom	22 November 2010	Digital download	Hospital	B0046CBITU / NHS177
