= Jestofunk =

- Origin: Italy
- Genres: Acid jazz
- Years active: 1992–present

Jestofunk are an Italian acid jazz musical group, formed in 1992 by DJ MozArt (Claudio Rispoli) and DJ Blade. They collaborated with American musician CeCe Rogers on their 1995 début album, Love in a Black Dimension, as well as later projects. The album sold 50,000 copies in Italy. The group's 2000 album, Universal Mother, featured American singer Jocelyn Brown.

== Discography ==
=== Albums ===
List of albums, with selected details
Title	Details
Love in a Black Dimension	Released: 1994; Format: Cassette, CD, 2×CD, 2×LP; Label: Rec in Pause
The Remixes	Released: 1997; Format: CD, 2×LP; Label: Irma
Universal Mother	Released: 1997; Format: CD, 3×LP; Label: Irma
Live	Released: 1999; Format: CD, 2×LP; Label: Rec in Pause
Seventy Miles from Philadelphia	Released: 2003; Format: CD, 2×LP; Label: Rec in Pause

=== Singles ===
List of singles, with selected chart positions
Title	Year	Peak chart positions	
Title	Year	AUS	UK
"I'm Gonna Love You (Come with Me)" (featuring Peech Boys)	1991	—	—
"Say It Again" (featuring CeCe Rogers)	1993	71	—
"Can We Live" (featuring CeCe Rogers)	1995	—	144
"Disco Queen"	2003	—	84
