= Medical History (album) =

Compilation album by Danny Byrd
- Released: 5 March 2007
- Recorded: 2005–07
- Genre: Drum & Bass
- Label: Hospital Records

Danny Byrd chronology
Medical History (2007)	Supersized (2008)

Singles from Medical History
- 1. "Do It Again" Released: 1 September 2000; 2. "Changes" Released: 29 January 2001; 3. "Soul Function / Junction 18" Released: 24 October 2005; 4. "Dog Hill / Fresh 89" Released: 3 July 2006; 5. "Rise Again / Control Freak" Released: 14 August 2006; 6. "Round & Round / Powderkiller" Released: 30 October 2006

Medical History is a compilation album of songs by drum & bass DJ, producer and musician Danny Byrd. It contains ten tracks from six different Danny Byrd singles released from 2000 to 2007. It was released as a digital download on 5 March 2007.

Other Hospital Records artists have their own compilation albums of the same name.

== Track listing ==
No.	Title	Length
1.	"Round and Round"	5:53
2.	"Junction 18"	5:30
3.	"Changes"	6:45
4.	"Soul Function"	7:13
5.	"Dog Hill"	5:54
6.	"Fresh 89"	7:03
7.	"Do It Again"	6:43
8.	"Rise Again" (featuring IK)	6:36
9.	"Control Freak" (Danny Byrd vs. Tomahawk)	5:36
10.	"Powder Killer"	4:58

== Release history ==
Region	Date	Format	Label
United Kingdom	5 March 2007	Digital Download	Hospital Records
