= Love Has Gone =

Single by Netsky

from the album 2
- Released: 30 July 2012
- Recorded: 2011
- Genre: Dance, drum and bass
- Length: 4:12
- Label: Hospital Records
- Songwriter(s): Skip Scarborough
- Producer(s): Boris Daenen

Netsky singles chronology
"Come Alive" (2012)	"Love Has Gone" (2012)	"We Can Only Live Today (Puppy)" (2012)

"Love Has Gone" is a song by Belgian drum and bass producer Netsky. The song was released on 30 July 2012 as a digital download in the United Kingdom from his second album 2. The song entered the UK Singles Chart at number 182 and also charted in Belgium. The song, produced by Boris Daenen, is based on a sample of the song "Love Ballad" by L.T.D., which was written by Skip Scarborough.

== Music video ==
A music video to accompany the release of "Love Has Gone" was first released onto YouTube on 25 June 2012 at a total length of four minutes and fifteen seconds. Produced and directed by Kash Black the video location is Barcelona.

== Track listings ==
Digital download
No.	Title	Length
1.	"Love Has Gone"	4:12
2.	"Love Has Gone" (Enei Remix)	5:39
3.	"Love Has Gone" (Dub Phizix Remix)	4:53
4.	"Love Has Gone" (Netsky's Love Must Go On Refix)	3:41
5.	"Cous Cous"	4:31

== Chart performance ==
Chart (2012)	Peak position
Belgium (Ultratop 50 Flanders)	14
Belgium Airplay (Ultratop Flanders)	17
Belgium Dance (Ultratop Flanders)	5
Belgium (Ultratip Bubbling Under Flanders)	5
Netherlands (Single Top 100)	93
UK Dance (OCC)	33
UK Indie (OCC)	12
UK Singles (Official Charts Company)	182

== Release history ==
Region	Date	Format	Label
United Kingdom	30 July 2012	Digital download	Hospital Records
