= Give & Take (song) =

Single by Netsky

from the album 2
- Released: 16 January 2012
- Recorded: 2010
- Genre: Dance, drum and bass
- Length: 4:12
- Label: Hospital
- Songwriter(s): Netsky

Netsky singles chronology
"Tonight" (2011)	"Give & Take" (2012)	"Come Alive" (2012)

"Give & Take" is a song by Belgian drum and bass producer Netsky. The song was released on 16 January 2012 as a digital download in the United Kingdom. It became the first single from his second album 2. The single peaked at number 196 on the UK Singles Chart, number 30 on the UK Dance Chart and number 28 on the UK Indie Chart.

A one-minute and forty-five second video to accompany the release of "Give & Take" was released onto YouTube on 16 January 2012.

== Track listings ==
Digital download
No.	Title	Length
1.	"Give & Take"	4:12

== Chart performance ==
=== Weekly charts ===
Chart (2012)	Peak position
Belgium (Ultratop 50 Flanders)	17
Belgium (Ultratip Bubbling Under Flanders)	64
Belgium Dance (Ultratop Flanders)	2
UK Dance (OCC)	30
UK Indie (OCC)	28
UK Singles (Official Charts Company)	196

=== Year-end charts ===
Chart (2012)	Position
Belgium (Ultratop Flanders)	95

== Release history ==
Region	Date	Format	Label
United Kingdom	16 January 2012	Digital download	Hospital Records
