= Liquid (musician) =

British dance act (1991–2025)

- Born: Eamon Downes
- Origin: England
- Genres: House; techno; breakbeat hardcore; rave; trance
- Years active: 1991–2025
- Labels: XL Recordings; Art & Craft
- Past members: Eamon Downes; Shane Heneghan

Liquid was a British dance act that originally consisted of Eamon Downes (a.k.a. Ame) and Shane Heneghan (a.k.a. Model).

== Biography ==
Liquid's first and best-known track, "Sweet Harmony", layered the house music of CeCe Rogers' "Someday" over rolling breakbeats. It was originally released in 1991 on a self-pressed white label Liquid EP of 500 copies, and was re-released on XL Recordings in 1992.

"Sweet Harmony" was followed by The Future Music EP which included "Liquid Is Liquid". Heneghan's departed from the group after its first two releases, but Liquid continued to be successful with "Time to Get Up" and "One Love Family", both of which were chosen as Mixmag 'singles of the week'. The first three Liquid EPs were produced by Jezz Wright at Blockhouse.

The NME described their 1995 debut album Liquid Culture as "sophisticated, soulful techno."

Liquid's singles have charted in the top 40 in the UK, and in Europe, and have performed live in many countries.

"Sweet Harmony" was re-released again, on XL Recordings, in December 2007, with remixes by James Talk, Dave Spoon and Streetlife DJs. A further drum and bass remix of "Sweet Harmony" by Danny Byrd was released in early 2010.

Downes, who was the only remaining member of Liquid, died on 21 July 2025, after a five-year battle with brain cancer. He was 56.

== Discography ==
=== Albums ===
- Culture (1995)
- Energy Flows (2017)
- Back to Rave 1 (2018)
- Spacemonkey (2019)
- Lethal (2021)
- Back to Rave 2 (2023)
- Atmospheric Rave (2023)

=== Singles and EPs ===
- Liquid EP (1991)
- "Sweet Harmony" (1992) - UK No. 15, BPI: Silver
- The Future Music EP (1992) - UK No. 59
- "Time to Get Up" (1993) - UK No. 46
- Liquid Love EP (1994) - UK No. 93
- "Sweet Harmony"/"One Love Family" (1995) - UK No. 14
- "Closer" (1995) - UK No. 47
- "Strong" (1998) - UK No. 59
- "Orlando Dawn" (2000) - UK No. 53
- "Sweet Harmony" (2004) - UK No. 87
- "Sweet Harmony" (Danny Byrd featuring Liquid) (2010) - UK No. 64
- "Toxic Drop" (2019)
- "Get Straight/Clout Chasing" (with Fast Eddie) (2020)
- "Dove Removal Machine" (2021)
