= Multimedia psychotherapy =

Multimedia psychotherapy is a new form of psychotherapy created by psychoanalyst Domenico A. Nesci (member of the International Psychoanalytic Association) and his son, producer artist Filippo A. Nesci, in Rome, Italy, in 2007.

The method was originally conceived as a technique to help mourning patients suffering from grief and bereavement. Nesci developed this form of psychotherapy working with a patient who suffered from complicated grief after the death of her father from lung cancer. The psychotherapy was first created after Nesci's own mourning when his parents died.

== Methodology ==
Multimedia psychotherapy involves the use of various multimedia objects of the dead relative like pictures, drawings, writings, video or audio recordings. The multimedia psychotherapy consists in a series of sessions (approximately 5 to 8 different sessions) scheduled in the following order: intake, picture sessions, music session, screening session, outcome.

1. In the intake, the therapist screens suitable patients and explains how the therapy works if he/she thinks that the technique can be effectively and safely applied.
2. During the picture sessions the patient brings photographs or videos of his/her lost love object (the person who had died) and freely associates on them (as if they were dreams) while recalling memories.
3. During the music session the therapist asks the patient to remind a song or a music that fits well to become the soundtrack of the "psychodynamic montage" that will be later produced by the producer/artist.
4. At this point, therapist and multimedia artist briefly meet and discuss the case. Patient's pictures and music are given to the artist by the therapist, so that there is no direct contact between patient and artist, at any time, during the whole therapy. When the artist has produced the "psychodynamic montage" (or "memory object") this is delivered to the therapist who can now schedule the screening session with the patient. During this central session, patient and therapist watch together the video and share the usually strong emotions it is able to promote. The patient is asked if any changes are to be made in case something is not acceptable. A few sessions then take place to help patient to engage in his/her blocked working through of the (repressed or disavowed) mourning process.
5. The psychodynamic montage is finally given to the patient and/or posted on a website where the patient and his/her relatives can see it (with a password).
