= Second Nature (Netsky album) =

Studio album by Netsky
- Released: 30 October 2020
- Genre: Drum and bass
- Length: 64:32
- Label: Hospital
- Producer: Boris Daenen

Netsky chronology
3 (2016)	Second Nature (2020)

Singles from Second Nature
- 1. "I See the Future in Your Eyes" Released: 3 April 2020; 2. "Mixed Emotions" Released: 21 August 2020; 3. "Blend" Released: 2 October 2020

Second Nature is the fourth studio album by Belgian producer Netsky, released through Hospital Records on 30 October 2020. The album marks Netsky's return to Hospital Records, and includes collaborations with Becky Hill, Rudimental and Sub Focus. Second Nature debuted in the top 10 of the Flemish albums chart, and also reached the top 20 in New Zealand.

== Music ==
Along with Netsky's signature drum and bass sound, the album also incorporates elements of other genres. Dancing Astronaut pointed to the "hip-hop hybrid" of "Blend", the influence of hardstyle on "Look at Me Go" and "disco energy" of "Don't Care What People Say".

== Artwork ==
Netsky chose the artwork, a photograph taken of him, his father and his dog on a mountain "somewhere in southern France when [he] was seven or eight", due to being heavily influenced by listening to his father's collection of soul music records when he was growing up. Netsky said he wanted "to grasp that feeling again" on the album, although he acknowledged that the influence of soul is "definitely not all over the record. Maybe 40 or 50% is really soulful and has winks to soul music, but the other half is very dance floor".

== Track listing ==
Second Nature track listing
No.	Title	Length
1.	"Hold On" (featuring Becky Hill)	3:43
2.	"Mixed Emotions" (featuring Montell2099)	4:27
3.	"Destiny" (with Sub Focus featuring Jozzy)	4:02
4.	"I Choose You"	2:58
5.	"Broken Bottles"	3:37
6.	"Blend" (with Rudimental featuring Afronaut Zu)	3:25
7.	"Let Me Hold You" (with Hybrid Minds)	3:22
8.	"Look at Me Go" (featuring Darren Styles)	3:46
9.	"Don't Care What People Say"	3:25
10.	"Complicated"	3:46
11.	"Free"	3:21
12.	"I See the Future in Your Eyes"	4:15
13.	"Waiting All Day to Get to You"	2:55
14.	"Power" (featuring Urbandawn)	3:46
15.	"Float"	3:20
16.	"Dreaming of You" (featuring Elias)	3:07
17.	"Everybody Loves the Sunshine" (featuring Daddy Waku and Chantal Kashala)	3:20
18.	"Basic Instinct"	3:57
Total length:		64:32

== Charts ==
=== Weekly charts ===
Weekly chart performance for Second Nature
Chart (2020)	Peak position
Belgian Albums (Ultratop Flanders)	8
Belgian Albums (Ultratop Wallonia)	187
New Zealand Albums (RMNZ)	16

=== Year-end charts ===
Year-end chart performance for Second Nature
Chart (2021)	Position
New Zealand Albums (RMNZ)	48
