= The Qemists =

English electronic music group

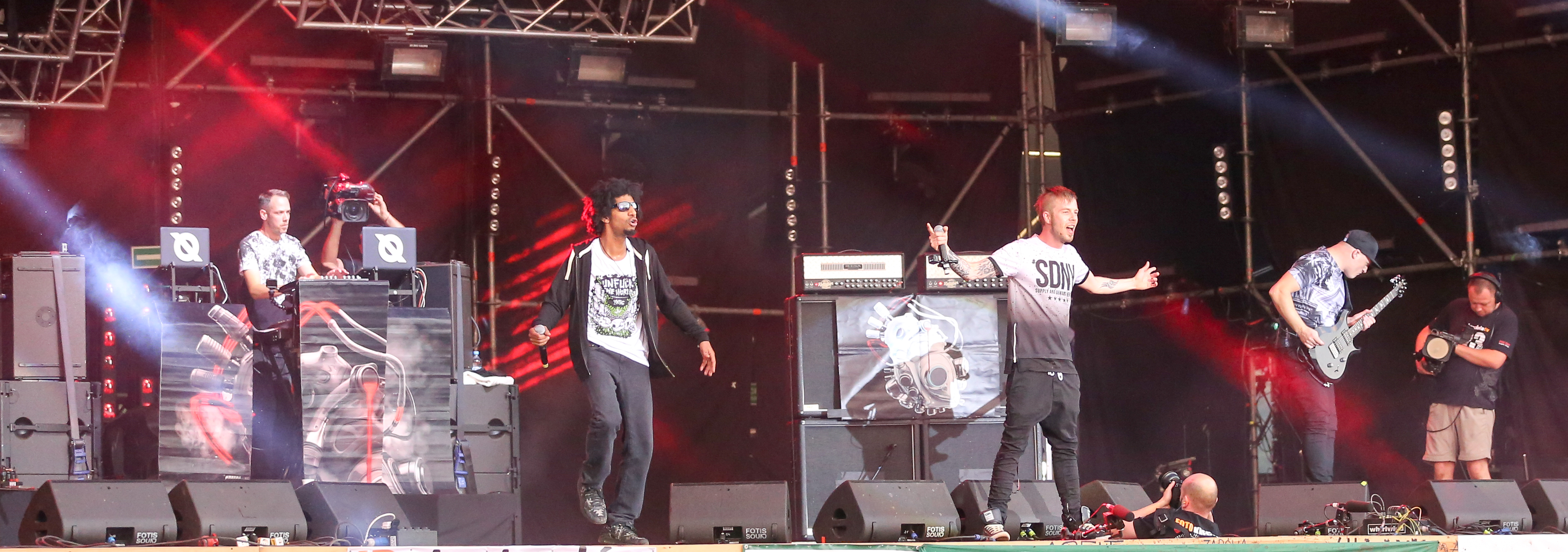
- The Qemists performing in 2017

Background information
- Origin: Brighton, England
- Genres: Electronic rock; alternative dance; drum and bass; big beat
- Years active: 2004 − present
- Labels: Mastermind Records (2004); Ninja Tune (2005–2012); Amazing Record Co. (2015–present); FiXT Music (North America only) (2016–present)
- Members: Dan Arnold; Leon Harris; Liam Black; Bruno Balanta; Oliver Simmons
- Past members: Matt Rose

The Qemists are an English electronic rock group, hailing from Brighton, Sussex. They are signed to Amazing Record Co., an indie record label based in the UK. The band have a separate deal with Beat Records for distribution in Japan and with Detroit-based label FiXT Music for North America.

== History ==
The Qemists were originally the drummer, bassist and guitarist in a rock band where they spent a lot of time touring UK and Europe as well as spending a lot of time in the studio. During this time in the rock band in the late 1990s, they acquired an interest in drum and bass and some of the group's early efforts started to get airplay. For many years they were performing in the rock band as their day job while producing and DJing drum and bass at night, and this conflict of interests led to the fusion of the two styles to form The Qemists sound that is known today. They had previously worked as live sound engineers for Basement Jaxx, Kano and Lady Sovereign.

Their debut release on Ninja Tune was a remix of Coldcut's "Everything Is Under Control" which was supported by Zane Lowe, Coldcut and Pendulum.

Their first single, "Stompbox", appeared on the soundtrack for the film Jumper. "Dem Na Like Me" and "Your Revolution" were used in Clay Porter's mountain bike movie 3 Minute Gaps (2011). "Stompbox" and "Tom Cat" appeared in the action movie Blitz (2011).

In 2009, they supported Enter Shikari on their World tour, and underwent their own headlining UK tour.

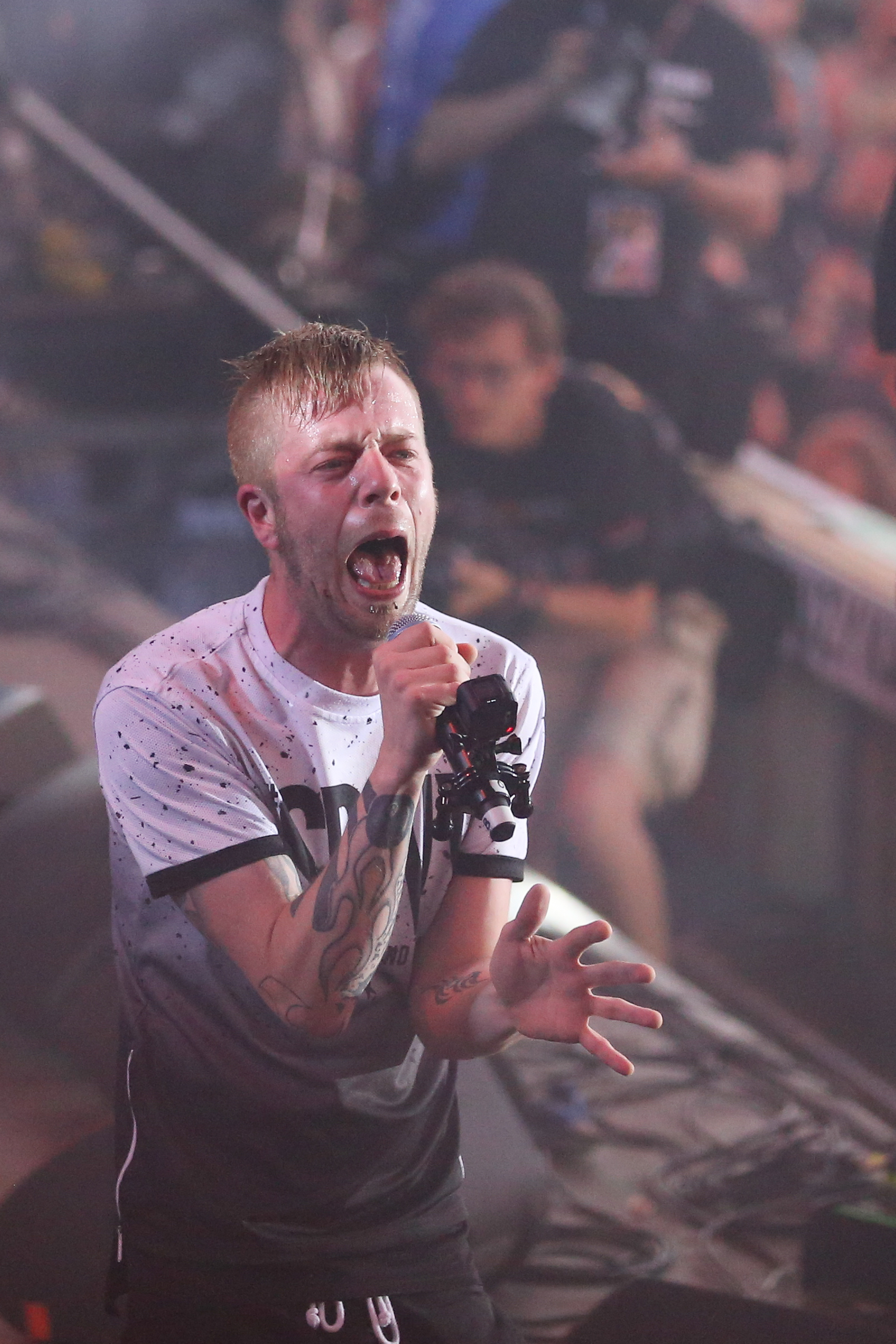
At Przystanek Woodstock (Woodstock Festival Poland) in 2017

In November 2015, they signed to Amazing Record Co., planning the release of Warrior Sound, their third studio album, on 4 March 2016.

== Members ==
- Bruno Balanta – vocals (MC)
- Oliver Simmons – vocals
- Liam Black – guitar
- Dan Arnold – bass, synth programming
- Leon Harris – drums

=== Former members ===
- Matt Rose – vocals

== Musical style ==
With the band's origins in heavy rock music and their fusion of electronic rock and drum and bass, The Qemists are often compared to bands such as Pendulum and The Prodigy.

== Discography ==
=== Studio albums ===
- Join the Q (2009)
- Spirit in the System (2010)
- Warrior Sound (2016)

=== Compilations ===
- Soundsystem (2011)

=== Singles ===
- "React" (2004)
- "Summer Son" (2004)
- "Iron Shirt" / "Let There Be Light" (2006)
- "Stompbox" (2007)
- "Dem Na Like Me" (feat. Wiley) (2008)
- "Lost Weekend" (feat. Mike Patton) (2008)
- "On the Run" (feat. Jenna G) (2009)
- "Drop Audio" (feat. I.D.) (2009)
- "Your Revolution" (feat. Matt Rose) (2010)
- "Hurt Less" (feat. Jenna G) (2010)
- "Renegade" (feat. Maxsta & MC I.D) (2010)
- "Take It Back" (feat. Enter Shikari) (2011)
- "No More" (2013)
- "Run You" (2016)
- "Anger" (feat. Kenta Koie of Crossfaith) (2016)
- "Takeover" (with Zardonic) (2018)
- "Crevasse" (2019)
- "Feel Alive" (with Prolix) (2019)
- "Deep Scars" (with 3D Stas) (2019)

=== Remixes ===
- Coldcut – "Everything Is Under Control" – (2005)
- Dr. Octagon – "Trees" – (2006)
- Coldcut – "True Skool" – (2006)
- Backini – "Radio" – (2006)
- Roots Manuva feat. Rodney P – "Swords in the Dirt" – (2007)
- The Count & Sinden feat. Kid Sister – "Beeper" – (2008)
- DJ Kentaro – "Rainy Day" – (2008)
- Coldcut – "Atomic Moog" – (2008)
- Innerpartysystem – "Die Tonight Live Forever" – (2008)
- Enter Shikari – "No Sleep Tonight" – (2009)
- Steve Aoki – "I'm in the House" – (2010)
- The Damned – "Smash It Up" – (2010)
- South Central – "The Day I Die" – (2011)
- In Flames – "Where The Dead Ships Dwell" – (2011)
- DJ Kentaro feat. DJ Krush – "Kikkake" – (2012)
- Hybrid – "Be Here Now" – (2014)
- The Heavy – "How You Like Me Now?" – (2014)
- Crossfaith – "Kill 'Em All" – (2017)
- Crush 40 – "Green Light Ride" – (2019)

=== Miscellaneous ===
- Let There Be Light (from Stompbox EP) – (2007)
- Lost Weekend (VIP) (from Lost Weekend EP) – (2008)
- Dem Na Like Me (VIP) (from Dem Na Like Me EP) – (2008)
- Play With Fire (from on the Run EP) – (2009)
- Renegade (VIP) (from Renegade EP) – (2010)
- Take It Back (VIP) (from Take It Back EP) – (2011)
- Dirty Words (VIP) (from Take It Back EP) – (2011)

=== Other appearances ===
- MotorStorm: Pacific Rift – "Stompbox", "On the Run (VIP Mix) / Speed Freak"
- Midnight Club: Los Angeles – "Stompbox"
- Pure – "Stompbox", "Drop Audio"
- Blur – "Stompbox (Spor Remix)", "On The Run (VIP Mix) / Speed Freak", "S.W.A.G", "Let There Be Light", "Dem Na Like Me (VIP Mix)"
- Need For Speed: Undercover – "Stompbox", "Stompbox (Spor Remix)"
- SSX – "Stompbox (Spor Remix)", "Lifeline", "Bones" ft. Kellermensch, "Deadly Rocks", "People's Gravity", "People's Air"
- Colin McRae: Dirt 2 – "Lost Weekend"
- Dirt: Showdown – "Take It Back"
- Forza Motorsport 3 – "Lost Weekend", "On the Run", "S.W.A.G (Instrumental)"
- MotorStorm: Arctic Edge – "Lost Weekend"
- Need for Speed: Shift – "Lost Weekend"
- Crackdown 2 – "Dem Na Like Me", "Smash It Up (The Qemists Remix)", "Affliction", "The Demand"
- F1 2010 – "On the Run"
- F1 2011 – "Tropicana", "Planet Terror"
- Forza Motorsport 4 – "Take It Back", "Dirty Words", "Your Revolution"
- GT Racing 2 - "Don't Lose It", "S.W.A.G"
- Need for Speed Rivals – "No More"
- Asphalt 8: Airborne – "Be Electric"
- OlliOlli – "Society"
- Forza Horizon 2 – "Renegade"
- Madden 17 – "New Design"
- Gran Turismo Sport – "Run You"
- Onrush – "Crevasse"
- Shadow Generations – "Doom Zone"
