= Culprate =

British electronic music producer

- Born: John Hislop
- Origin: Watford, England
- Genres: Dubstep, drum and bass, IDM, electronica
- Years active: 2005–present
- Labels: Dubsaw Recordings, Gradient Audio, Inspected, OWSLA, Neosignal, Disciple, Upscale, Open Outlets

John Hislop, better known by his stage name Culprate is a British electronic music producer based in Bristol, England. His music ranges in style from IDM to dubstep. He established his role in the burgeoning UK dubstep scene by releasing EPs on Dubsaw Recordings and Inspected Records from 2010 to 2013.

== Career ==
Culprate started his musical career as part of the UK dubstep scene, and many of his earlier releases were on popular dubstep labels such as Dubsaw and Inspected.

Around 2014, his music started to incorporate influences found in experimental rock music from bands like Radiohead and Pink Floyd. To release this music, he founded the label Open Outlets. At first, this was only used to release his own music, but ever since 2017, other artists have been allowed onto its roster.

In 2014, Culprate released his third album Deliverance, which was crowdfunded on Indiegogo. The financial support went towards studio time, musicians and various other production factors and had accrued over £26,000. The album was noted for its experimental style and wide range of musical influences.

Critics noted a significant shift in style compared to his earlier works, noting genre influences such as ambient, breakcore and drum & bass. Culprate himself described this style purely as "experimental".

On 29 November 2019, Culprate's crowdfunding page for a brand-new album on Indiegogo went live, promising to be a spiritual successor to his albums Colours and Deliverance. The album, entitled αριθμός τέσσερα, was released in 2022. The title is a translation from Greek to "Number Four" and pronounced "Arithmos Tessera". The album features a large amount of live instrumentation and complex sound design.

Culprate has collaborated with several other artists including Modestep, Phace, and KOAN Sound.

== Personal life ==
Culprate revealed in an interview with UKF that he was diagnosed with attention deficit hyperactivity disorder as a child, although did not take medication until adulthood.

Culprate is friends with Bristol-based electronic music duo KOAN Sound with whom he received feedback during some of his writing, particularly during the production of Deliverance.

== Discography ==
Studio albums

- Flatline (2011, Gradient Audio)
- Colours (2011, Gradient Audio)
- Deliverance (2014, Open Outlets)
- Others (2018, Inspected)
- αριθμός τέσσερα (2022, self-released)
- Normal (2024, Inspected)

Extended plays

- Culprate / Suspect & Switchdubs - Don't Do That / Rotary (2009, Dubsaw Recordings)
- Trench Foot / Flagrance (2010, Dubsaw Recordings)
- Balkansky & Culprate - Sundrome / Android (2011, Dubsaw Recordings)
- 5 Star EP (2011, Inspected Records)
- Nightmares In Reality EP (2012, Inspected Records)
- The Great Expedition (2013, Inspected Records)
- Mask (2015, Open Outlets)
- Dawn (2017, Open Outlets)
- Unity Project, Pt. 1 (2017, Open Outlets)
- Unity Project, Pt. 2 (2017, Open Outlets)
- Unity Project, Pt. 3 (2018, Open Outlets)
- Unity Project, Pt. 4 (2018, Open Outlets)
