= Tonight (Danny Byrd song) =

Single by Danny Byrd featuring Netsky

from the album Rave Digger
- B-side: "Judgement Day VIP"
- Released: 6 February 2011
- Recorded: 2010
- Genre: Drum and bass; electronic
- Length: 5:43
- Label: Hospital
- Songwriter(s): Danny Byrd

Danny Byrd singles chronology
"We Can Have It All" (2010)	"Tonight" (2011)	"Paperchase" (2011)

Netsky singles chronology
"Moving With You" (2010)	"Tonight" (2011)	"Give & Take" (2012)

"Tonight" is a song by drum and bass DJ, producer and musician Danny Byrd featuring fellow Hospital Records artist Netsky. It is the fourth single released from his third album Rave Digger. The song was released on 6 February 2011 for digital download and on 12" vinyl on 7 February 2011. The single peaked at number 91 on the UK Singles Chart and number 11 on the UK Dance Chart. It also got featured in Need for Speed: The Run for the Wii and Nintendo 3DS.

== Track listings ==
12"
No.	Title	Length
1.	"Tonight" (feat. Netsky)	5:43
2.	"Judgement Day VIP" (feat. Cyantific & I-Kay)	5:04

Digital download
No.	Title	Length
1.	"Tonight" (feat. Netsky)	5:52
2.	"Judgement Day VIP" (feat. Cyantific & I-Kay)	4:54
3.	"Tonight" (feat. Netsky; MJ Cole remix)	6:24
4.	"Tonight" (feat. Netsky; Cutline remix)	5:13
5.	"Tonight" (feat. Netsky; Radio Edit)	3:35
6.	"Tonight" (feat. Netsky; MJ Cole Instrumental remix)	6:23

== Chart performance ==
Chart (2011)	Peak position
Belgium (Ultratip Bubbling Under Flanders)	25
UK Dance (OCC)	11
UK Singles (The Official Charts Company)	91

== Release history ==
Region	Date	Format	Label	Catalogue
United Kingdom	6 February 2011	Digital download	Hospital Records	B004GER996
United Kingdom	7 February 2011	12"	Hospital Records	B004FFJG88
