= 2 (Netsky album) =

Studio album by Netsky
- Released: 25 June 2012
- Recorded: 2011–2012
- Genre: Drum and bass; liquid funk; dubstep; drumstep; electro house
- Length: 60:33
- Label: Hospital
- Producer: Boris Daenen

Netsky chronology
Netsky (2010)	2 (2012)	3 (2016)

Singles from 2
- 1. "Give & Take" Released: 16 January 2012; 2. "Come Alive" Released: 21 May 2012; 3. "Love Has Gone" Released: 30 July 2012

Singles from 2 Deluxe
- 1. "We Can Only Live Today (Puppy)" Released: 5 November 2012

2 is the second album from Belgian drum and bass producer Netsky. It was released on 25 June 2012 through Hospital Records on multiple formats, including digital download, CD and vinyl. The album includes the singles "Give & Take", "Come Alive", "Love Has Gone", and the deluxe edition of the album includes the single "We Can Only Live Today (Puppy)". It became Netsky's first number one album topping the Belgian Albums Chart.

== Singles ==
- "Give & Take" was released as the lead single from the album on 16 January 2012.
- "Come Alive" was released as the second single from the album on 21 May 2012.
- "Love Has Gone" was released as the third single from the album on 30 July 2012.
- "We Can Only Live Today (Puppy) was released as the first single from the deluxe edition of the album 2 Deluxe on 5 November 2012. It is the fourth and final single from the album overall.

=== Other songs ===
"When Darkness Falls" was released as the iTunes Single of the Week for limited free download on the week of 30 June 2012.

Music video were given to the songs "Puppy" (20 June 2012), "No Beginning" (10 July 2012), "Squad Up" (28 August 2012), "The Whistle Song" (22 March 2013), and "When Darkness Falls" (16 April 2013), as well as all of the singles. The videos were released through the official Hospital Records YouTube channel.

== Track listing ==
=== Standard edition ===
Digital download, CD
No.	Title	Length
1.	"Love Has Gone"	4:11
2.	"The Whistle Song" (featuring Dynamite MC)	4:39
3.	"Wanna Die For You" (featuring Diane Charlemagne)	4:17
4.	"Come Alive"	4:09
5.	"Give & Take"	4:08
6.	"Get Away From Here" (featuring Selah Sue)	4:13
7.	"911"	3:23
8.	"Squad Up" (featuring Jimmy Jams)	3:44
9.	"Jetlag Funk"	5:18
10.	"Puppy"	4:20
11.	"When Darkness Falls" (featuring Bridgette Amofah)	3:52
12.	"Detonate"	3:50
13.	"No Beginning"	5:19
14.	"Dubplate Special" (featuring Darrison)	0:48
15.	"Drawing Straws"	4:15

2 Deluxe bonus tracks
No.	Title	Length
1.	"We Can Only Live Today (Puppy)" (featuring Billie)	3:25
2.	"500 Days of Summer"	4:07
3.	"Wanna Die For You" (Metrik and Netsky Rework)	4:40
4.	"Strobot (Netsky Remix)" (by Shameboy)	4:14
5.	"No Strings Attached"	5:15
6.	"Get Away From Here" (Instrumental)	4:15
7.	"Cous Cous"	4:31
8.	"Squad Up" (Instrumental)	3:44
9.	"Love Has Gone" (Netsky's Love Must Go On Refix)	3:42
10.	"Come Alive" (Rockwell Remix)	5:40
11.	"No Beginning" (Downbeat Mix)	3:31
12.	"Love Has Gone" (Other Echoes Remix)	4:30
13.	"Wanna Die For You" (Live at Pukkelpop)	4:51
14.	"Come Alive" (Live at Pukkelpop)	4:11
15.	"Give & Take" (Live at Ancienne Belgique)	3:45

=== Vinyl ===
1. "Love Has Gone"
2. "911"
3. "Jetlag Funk"
4. "No Beginning" (Downbeat Mix)
5. "Drawing Straws"
6. "Detonate"
7. "Get Away From Here" (Instrumental)
8. "Give & Take"

== Charts ==
=== Weekly charts ===
Chart (2012)	Peak position
Belgian Albums (Ultratop Flanders)	1
Belgian Albums (Ultratop Wallonia)	74
New Zealand Albums (RMNZ)	13
Scottish Albums (OCC)	94
UK Albums (OCC)	29
UK Dance Albums (OCC)	2
UK Independent Albums (OCC)	4
US Heatseekers Albums (Billboard)	41

=== Year-end charts ===
Chart (2012)	Position
Belgian Albums (Ultratop Flanders)	8
Chart (2013)	Position
Belgian Albums (Ultratop Flanders)	40
