= We Can Only Live Today (Puppy) =

Single by Netsky featuring Billie

from the album 2 Deluxe
- Released: November 5, 2012
- Recorded: 2012
- Genre: Dance, electro house
- Length: 3:24
- Label: Hospital Records
- Songwriter(s): Boris Daenen, Billie Bentein

Netsky singles chronology
"Love Has Gone" (2012)	"We Can Only Live Today (Puppy)" (2012)	"Running Low" (2014)

"We Can Only Live Today (Puppy)" is a song by Belgian drum and bass producer Netsky, featuring vocals from Billie. The song was released on November 5, 2012, as a digital download in the United Kingdom. It appears on the deluxe edition of his second album 2. The song was written by Boris Daenen and Billie Bentein. It is the vocal version of the instrumental track "Puppy" from the standard edition of his album. It has peaked at number 8 in Belgium. A physical 10" vinyl was released for Record Store Day 2013.

== Music video ==
A music video to accompany the release of "We Can Only Live Today (Puppy)" was first released onto YouTube on October 31, 2012, at a total length of three minutes and thirty-nine seconds. The video was directed by Andrew Attah and shot by Nezih Savaşkan. The video was filmed in Mid Wales.

== Track listings ==
Digital download
No.	Title	Length
1.	"We Can Only Live Today (Puppy)"	3:24
2.	"We Can Only Live Today (Puppy)" (Camo & Krooked Remix)	4:10
3.	"We Can Only Live Today (Puppy)" (Lemaitre Remix)	3:11
4.	"We Can Only Live Today (Puppy)" (Modek Remix)	5:51

Limited edition 10" vinyl
No.	Title	Length
1.	"We Can Only Live Today (Puppy)" (Original) (feat. Billie)	3:24
2.	"We Can Only Live Today (Puppy)" (Modek Remix) (feat. Billie)	5:51
3.	"Puppy"	4:20

== Chart performance ==
Chart (2012)	Peak position
Belgium (Ultratop 50 Flanders)	8
Belgium Airplay (Ultratop Flanders)	7
Belgium Dance (Ultratop Flanders)	2
Belgium (Ultratip Bubbling Under Flanders)	1
Belgium (Ultratop 50 Wallonia)	46
Belgium Airplay (Ultratop Wallonia)	5
Belgium Dance (Ultratop Wallonia)	1
Belgium (Ultratip Bubbling Under Wallonia)	15

== Release history ==
Region	Date	Format	Label
United Kingdom	November 5, 2012	Digital Download	Hospital Records
Belgium	April 20, 2013	10" vinyl	La Musique Fait La Force
