= Supersized =

Studio album by Danny Byrd
- Released: 26 May 2008
- Recorded: 2007–08
- Genre: Electronic, drum and bass
- Length: 1:08:21
- Label: Hospital Records

Danny Byrd chronology
Medical History (2007)	Supersized (2008)	Rave Digger (2010)

Singles from Supersized
- 1. "Shock Out" Released: 4 February 2008; 2. "From Bath With Love" Released: 28 July 2008; 3. "Red Mist" Released: 26 June 2009

Supersized is the debut studio album of drum & bass DJ, producer and musician Danny Byrd. It was released on 26 May 2008 through Hospital Records.

== Singles ==
- "Shock Out" was the first single released from the album, it was released on 4 February 2008.
- "From Bath With Love" was the second single released from the album, it was released on 28 July 2008.
- "Red Mist" was the third single released from the album, it was released on 26 June 2009.

== Track listing ==
No.	Title	Length
1.	"Shock Out"	5:48
2.	"Gold Rush" (featuring Brookes Brothers)	6:27
3.	"Weird Science"	6:31
4.	"From Bath With Love" (featuring T-Lace)	6:44
5.	"Supersized"	5:11
6.	"Joy and Pain" (featuring ReDD)	6:19
7.	"Red Mist" (featuring IK)	5:04
8.	"Feet Won't Touch the Ground"	6:52
9.	"Planet Music V.I.P" (featuring Adrok & MC Foxy)	5:16
10.	"Labyrinth"	5:51
11.	"Soul Function"	6:16
Total length:		68:21

Double-Vinyl LP
No.	Title	Length
1.	"Gold Rush" (featuring Brookes Brothers)	6:27
2.	"Supersized"	5:11
3.	"Weird Science"	6:31
4.	"Feet Won't Touch the Ground"	6:52
Total length:		25:02

== Release history ==
Region	Date	Format	Label	Catalogue
United Kingdom	26 May 2008	Digital Download	Hospital Records	B0015P8CHC
United Kingdom	26 May 2008	CD	Hospital Records	B0015P8CHC
United Kingdom	26 May 2008	2x12" vinyl	Hospital Records	B0018CVQUC
