= Danny Byrd =

English DJ and record producer (born 1979)

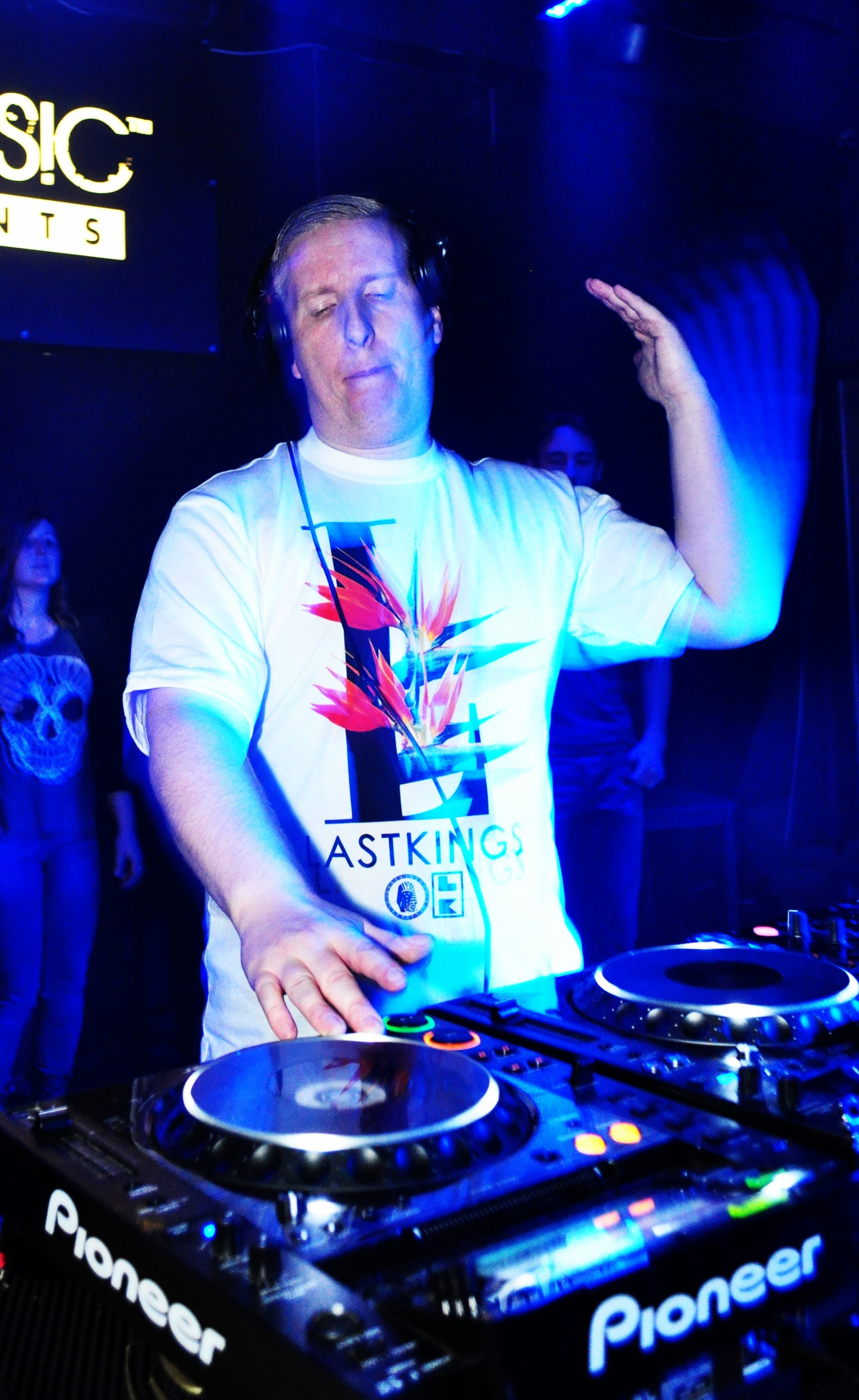
- Danny Byrd at Republic Live, 2014

Background information
- Birth name: Danny Byrd
- Born: 4 May 1979 (age 46)
- Origin: Bath, Somerset, England
- Genres: Drum and bass; liquid funk; UK garage
- Occupations: DJ; record producer; musician
- Years active: 1997–present
- Labels: Hospital; Ministry of Sound
- Website: byrdfeed.co.uk

Danny Byrd (born 4 May 1979) is an English DJ, record producer and musician from Bath in the South West of England. He is influenced by genres such as house, UK garage, R&B and the jungle sound. He primarily releases his music through Hospital Records, the UK-based independent dance music label. In 2009, his track "Red Mist VIP" reached number one on the UK Dance Chart on the week ending 25 July 2009, and on 7 February 2010, his remix of Liquid's Sweet Harmony gave him his first success on the UK Singles Chart, making No. 64. In October 2010, Byrd reached No. 36 in the UK Singles Chart with the track "Ill Behaviour".

== History ==
Byrd was one of the first artists to sign to Hospital Records in 1999. His first Hospital singles were Do It Again and Changes.

In 2000, BBC Radio 1's Fabio championed Danny's remix of London Elektricity's Wishing Well. Remixes by Byrd for High Contrast and contributions to the Hospital Records compilation Weapons of Mass Creation followed.

In 2008, Byrd's debut studio album Supersized was released on Hospital Records, including notable tracks like Shock Out, Gold Rush, Weird Science and Red Mist. Red Mist VIP, a new version of the latter track, appeared on Hospital's compilation Sick Music and has appeared in the film Dead Man Running and computer games Midnight Club LA and DJ Hero.

Byrd second studio album Rave Digger was released in October 2010. The lead single "Ill Behaviour" (featuring I-Kay) has been supported by MistaJam, Annie Mac and Sara Cox on BBC Radio 1. The single was promoted to Radio 1's A-list on 8 September 2010.

His album Golden Ticket was released in June 2013.

In September 2018, he released his latest album Atomic Funk.

In October 2021, Byrd signed with Ministry of Sound.

== Discography ==
=== Albums ===
Year	Album details	Peak chart positions
Year	Album details	UK
2008	Supersized: Released: 26 May 2008; Label: Hospital Records; Formats: CD, digital download, vinyl	—
2010	Rave Digger: Released: 10 October 2010; Label: Hospital Records; Formats: CD, digital download, vinyl	68
2013	Golden Ticket: Released: 24 June 2013; Label: Hospital Records; Formats: CD, digital download, vinyl	181
2018	Atomic Funk: Released: 7 September 2018; Label: Hospital Records; Formats: CD, digital download, vinyl	—

=== Compilation albums ===
Year	Album details
2007	Medical History: Released: 5 March 2007; Label: Hospital Records; Formats: Digital Download

=== Mixtape ===
Year	Release
2013	Byrd Is the Word: Released: 29 November 2013

=== Singles ===
Year	Single	Chart positions			Album
Year	Single	UK	UK Dance	BEL (VL)	Album
2000	"Do It Again" / "Dub It Again"	—	—	—	Medical History
2001	"Changes" / "Changed"	—	—	—	Medical History
2005	"Soul Function" / "Junction 18"	—	—	—	Medical History
2006	"Dog Hill" / "Fresh 89"	—	—	—	Medical History
2006	"Rise Again" / "Control Freak"	—	—	—	Medical History
2006	"Round & Round" / "Powderkiller"	—	—	—	Medical History
2008	"Shock Out" / "Labyrinth"	—	—	—	Supersized
2008	"From Bath with Love" / "Shock Out VIP"	—	—	—	Supersized
2009	"Red Mist" (feat. IK)	147	1	—	Supersized
2010	"Sweet Harmony" (feat. Liquid)	64	6	—	Rave Digger
2010	"Ill Behaviour" (feat. I-Kay)	36	7	—	Rave Digger
2010	"We Can Have It All"	144	22	—	Rave Digger
2011	"Tonight" (feat. Netsky)	91	11	75	Rave Digger
2011	"Paperchase" (with Brookes Brothers)	—	—	—	Brookes Brothers
2012	"Blaze the Fire (Rah!)" (feat. General Levy)	—	—	—	Non-album single
2013	"Grit" (feat. Roni Size) / "Love You Like This"	—	—	—	Golden Ticket
2013	"4th Dimension" / "Bad Boy (Back Again)"	—	—	—	Golden Ticket
2015	"Climb High" (with Brookes Brothers)	—	—	—	Orange Lane
2017	"Jam"	—	—	—	Hospitality in the Park 2017
2018	"Devil's Drop"	—	—	—	Sick Music 2018
2018	"Superhero" (with Just Us feat. Macy Gray)	—	—	—	Non-album single
2018	"Salute" (feat. MC GQ)	—	—	—	Atomic Funk
2018	"Hold Up the Crown" (feat. Ky Lenz)	—	—	—	Atomic Funk
2019	"Starting It Over" (feat. Hannah Symons)	—	—	—	Atomic Funk
2020	"Boomshaka" (with René LaVice)	—	—	—	TBA
2021	"Selecta" (feat. D Double E)	—	—	—	Non-album single

=== Remixes ===
Year	Artist	Release
2000	Brian McKnight	"Stay or Let It Go"
2001	London Elektricity	"Wishing Well"
2002	Tungsten	"Expand Your Mind"
2002	High Contrast	"Music Is Everything"
2003	E-Z-Rollers	"RS2000"
2004	Park Street Productions	"Blackground Music"
2006	BCee & Lomax	"Dust 'til Dawn"
2009	Rudenko	"Everybody"
2009	Sharam (featuring Kid Cudi)	"She Came Along"
2009	SugaRush Beat Company	"Love Breed"
2009	Timmy Vegas & Bad Lay-Dee	"Another Dimension"
2010	Swedish House Mafia vs. Tinie Tempah	"Miami 2 Ibiza"
2010	Plan B	"Love Goes Down"
2011	London Elektricity (featuring Elsa Esmeralda)	"Meteorites"
2011	London Elektricity	"ロンドンは夜8時 (Lon 8pm ↔ Tyo 4m)"
2011	Clare Maguire	"The Last Dance"
2012	Flux Pavilion	"Daydreamer"
2013	Wookie (featuring Eliza Doolittle)	"The Hype"
2013	Majestic & Jungle 70	"Creeping in the Dark"
2013	Krystal Klear (featuring Jenna G)	"Addiction"
2015	Enter Shikari	"There's a Price on Your Head"
2015	Sigala	"Easy Love"
2015	Stanton Warriors (featuring Laura Steele)	"The One"
2016	Becky Hill	"Warm"
2016	DJ Fresh & Diplo (featuring R. City, Selah Sue and Craig David)	"Bang Bang"
2018	Kideko	"Good Thing"
2018	Keys N Krates (featuring Tory Lanez)	"Music to My Ears"
2019	Ninjaman	"Murder Dem"
2019	Wiley (featuring Tory Lanez, Kranium and Dappy)	"My One"
2020	dEVOLVE, Breikthru & Saint Wade	"Deep in My Heart"
2022	Acen	"Trip To The Moon (Part 1)"
2022	Jonasu & JC Stewart	"On My Mind"

=== Other songs ===
- 1998 – "Manhattan"
- 2000 – "The Strutt" / "Walk Tall"
- 2004 – "Planet Music" (Note: from the Hospital Records compilation album Weapons of Mass Creation) (with Adrok featuring MC Foxy)
- 2007 – "Under the Sea" (Note: from the Hospital Records compilation album Weapons of Mass Creation 3)
- 2009 – "California" (Note: Remix of the Zarif song from the album Box of Secrets; released as a single in 2009.) (with Zarif)
- 2014 – "Supersonic" (Note: from the Hospital Records compilation album We Are 18)
