= 3 (Netsky album) =

Studio album by Netsky
- Released: 3 June 2016
- Recorded: 2013–2015
- Genres: Drum and bass; dance-pop; electro-funk; electropop; electro house; breakbeat; dubstep
- Length: 46:33
- Labels: Sony; Hospital; Epic; Ultra
- Producer: Boris Daenen

Netsky chronology
2 (2012)	3 (2016)	Second Nature (2020)

Singles from 3
- 1. "Rio" Released: 5 July 2015; 2. "Work It Out" Released: 22 January 2016; 3. "Higher" Released: 25 March 2016 (promotional) / 20 May 2016 (re-release); 4. "Forget What You Look Like" Released: 25 March 2016; 5. "TNT" Released: 20 May 2016

3 (stylised as III) is the third studio album by Belgian drum and bass musician Netsky. It was released on 3 June 2016 as a digital download through Sony Music in the UK and Europe, and through Ultra Music in the United States. It was also released physically on 10 June 2016 through Epic Records on CD and through Hospital Records on vinyl. The album includes the singles "Rio", "Work It Out", "Higher", and promotional singles "Forget What You Look Like" and "TNT". It became Netsky's second album to top the Belgian Albums Chart.

3 is also Netsky's first album since signing to Sony Music, having previously been exclusively under Hospital Records.

== Singles ==
"Rio" was released as the album's official lead single on 5 July 2015. It features vocals from London-based music producer and songwriter Digital Farm Animals (real name Nick Gale). The track was premiered one month earlier through BBC Radio 1 as Annie Mac's Friday Night Special Delivery for 12 June. The official music video for "Rio" premiered on 6 July, the day after its release. The cartoon-style clip was directed and designed by animation collective Powster. It features both artists as animated versions of themselves on an adventure through the title city.

In 2016 "Work It Out", which also featured Digital Farm Animals, was released as the follow-up single from the album on 22 January. It was premiered the day before as Annie Mac's Hottest Record in the World on 21 January 2016. The official music video, described as "an everyday tale of high schoolers with giant cartoon heads and telekinetic powers", premiered one month later on 23 February 2016. The interactive video, created by Powster in association with Vevo, enables the viewer from their devices to manipulate objects within the video in real time as you are given the power of telekinesis. The video was directed by Leo Bridle for Powster with live action footage directed by Charlotte Regan for xFilm. Both artists make a cameo appearance from the previous music video.

"Higher", a collaborative track with Los Angeles-based DJ/producer Jauz, was initially released as a promotional single on 25 March (along with the release of "Forget What You Look Like"). The collaboration was premiered two days prior as Zane Lowe's World Record through his Beats 1 radio show. A fan music video was premiered through Vevo on 13 May. It features a performance by Belgian dance crew Battledroids filmed in one shot by Richard Van der Vieren of An Overdose Of Awesomeness (AOOA) TV. "Higher" later became the third official single from the album on 20 May (the same day as the release of "TNT"), supported with a remix by British drum and bass duo The Prototypes.

"Forget What You Look Like" was released as a promotional single on 25 March 2016, following the announcement of the album. It featured vocals from Canadian singer Lowell, which were sampled from her 2015 collaboration with German DJ Alle Farben, titled "Get High".

"TNT" was released as a promotional single on 20 May 2016, the album's original intended release date. It features Dave 1, one-half of electro-funk outfit Chromeo, and was co-written by singer-songwriter Sam Frank (who previously collaborated with Netsky providing vocals on the song "Without You"). The track was heavily inspired by Prince — more specifically, his 1979 hit song "I Wanna Be Your Lover". Netsky, who named Prince as one of his musical heroes, recorded the song months before the musician's death.

== Track listing ==
All tracks are written by Boris Daenen; additional writers are listed below

3 track listing
No.	Title	Writer(s)	Producer(s)	Length
1.	"Thunder" (featuring Emeli Sandé)	Daenen; Sandé; Jonny Coffer	Netsky; Jonny Coffer^{[a]}	3:29
2.	"Work It Out" (featuring Digital Farm Animals)	Daenen; Nicholas James Gale; Teddy Geiger; Sam Roman; Evan Voytas	Netsky; Teddy Geiger^{[a]}	3:18
3.	"Rio" (featuring Digital Farm Animals)	Daenen; Gale	Netsky	3:49
4.	"Leave It Alone" (featuring Saint Raymond)	Daenen; Hanni Ibrahim; Gale	Netsky; Digital Farm Animals^{[a]}	4:11
5.	"Who Knows" (featuring Paije)	Daenen; Karen Poole; David Etherington; Paije Richardson	Netsky	3:30
6.	"Go 2"	Daenen; Gale	Netsky; Digital Farm Animals^{[a]}	4:12
7.	"High Alert" (featuring Sara Hartman)	Daenen; James Newman; Edward Jonathan "Jonny" Harris; Daniel Zak "Danny" Watts	Netsky	4:05
8.	"TNT" (featuring Dave 1 from Chromeo)	Daenen; Sam Frank; Dave Macklovitch	Netsky	3:40
9.	"Stay Up with Me" (featuring Arlissa)	Daenen; Arlissa Ruppert; Patrick Mascall; Mark Taylor	Netsky	3:21
10.	"Forget What You Look Like" (featuring Lowell)	Daenen; Elizabeth Lowell Boland; Sacha Skarbek	Netsky	3:36
11.	"Bird of Paradise"	Daenen	Netsky	4:48
12.	"Higher" (Jauz X Netsky)	Daenen; Leon Else; Joshua Thompson; Sam Vogel	Jauz; Netsky; Joshua Thompson^{[a]}	4:34
Total length:				46:33

Notes

- ^{^a} signifies an additional producer.
- "Higher" is not featured on the vinyl release.

== Personnel ==
- Elizabeth Lowell Boland – vocals (10. "Forget What You Look Like")
- Jonny Coffer – additional production, strings, guitar (1. "Thunder")
- Boris "Netsky" Daenen – production, mixing (all tracks), mastering (all tracks except 3. "Rio")
- DC – vocals (uncredited) (11. "Bird of Paradise")
- Leon Else – vocals (12. "Higher")
- Sam Frank – backing vocals (8. "TNT")
- Nicholas "Digital Farm Animals" Gale – additional production (4. "Leave It Alone", 6. "Go 2"), vocals (2. "Work It Out", 3. "Rio", 6. "Go 2")
- Teddy Geiger – additional production (2. "Work It Out")
- Sara Hartman – vocals (7. "High Alert")
- Stuart Hawkes – mastering (3. "Rio")
- Dave Macklovitch (Dave 1) – lead vocals (8. "TNT")
- Saint Raymond – vocals (4. "Leave It Alone")
- Paije Johannes Lamarill Richardson – vocals (5. "Who Knows")
- Arlissa Ruppert – vocals (9. "Stay Up With Me")
- Emeli Sandé – vocals (1. "Thunder")
- Joshua Thompson – additional production, background vocal (12. "Higher")
- Sam "Jauz" Vogel – production, mixing (12. "Higher")

Credits adapted from liner notes.

== Charts ==
=== Weekly charts ===
Chart (2016)	Peak position
Belgian Albums (Ultratop Flanders)	1
Belgian Albums (Ultratop Wallonia)	35
New Zealand Albums (RMNZ)	25
UK Albums (OCC)	109
UK Dance Albums (Official Charts)	4
US Top Dance Albums (Billboard)	7
US Heatseekers Albums (Billboard)	21

=== Year-end charts ===
Chart (2016)	Position
Belgian Albums (Ultratop Flanders)	40

== Release history ==
Region	Date	Format	Label
Belgium	3 June 2016	Digital download	541; N.E.W.S.
United States	3 June 2016	Digital download	Ultra
United Kingdom	3 June 2016	Digital download	Sony Music Entertainment UK Limited
United Kingdom	10 June 2016	LP	Hospital
United Kingdom	10 June 2016	CD	Epic
Belgium	10 June 2016	CD	541; N.E.W.S.

== See also ==
- List of number-one albums of 2016 (Belgium)
