= Scribble (song) =

2010 song by Underworld

Single by Underworld

from the album Barking
- Released: June 28, 2010
- Genre: Drum and bass
- Length: 6:58
- Songwriters: Karl Hyde, Rick Smith, Lincoln Barrett
- Producers: Rick Smith, High Contrast

"Scribble" is a song by electronic group Underworld. It was released as the first single from their album Barking. The track, co-produced by High Contrast, was released as a digital single on 28 June 2010.

== Music video ==
The video is directed by Toby Vogel, and it is a lo-fi video with live footage and band member Karl Hyde singing the song in a car, which is being driven down what looks to be the A13 around Newham.

== Track list ==
1. "Scribble" (Album Version)
2. "Scribble" (Radio Edit)
3. "Scribble" (Netsky Remix)

== Charts ==
Chart (2010)	Peak position
UK Dance (Official Charts)	32
