= CeCe Rogers =

American singer (born 1962)

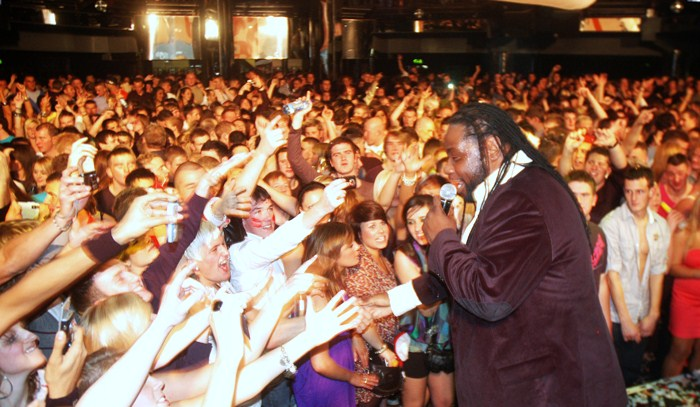
- CeCe Rogers in Manchester, United Kingdom

Background information
- Born: Kenneth Jesse Rogers III; April 30, 1962 (age 64); Cleveland, Ohio, United States
- Genres: House; gospel; R&B
- Occupations: Singer; songwriter; record producer
- Years active: 1987–1999; 2008–present
- Labels: Atlantic; Sony; USB
- Website: cecerogers.com

CeCe Rogers (born Kenneth Jesse Rogers III, April 30, 1962), is an American singer, songwriter and record producer from Cleveland, Ohio.

He was given the nickname CeCe by James Brown, who watched him performing at 11 years of age, imitating Chubby Checker. He is considered one of the most popular male vocalists in house music. In 1987, he recorded the track "Someday" in collaboration with Marshall Jefferson, an anthem of house music, having been rated number 3 in Mixmag's 100 Greatest Singles of All Time.

His track "All Join Hands" became popular in 1991, after Laurent Garnier began to mix it with Pulsation's "Transpulsation".

== Early life ==
Rogers attended Shaw High School in East Cleveland, Ohio and Berklee College of Music, in Boston, Massachusetts. He began studying piano at the age of five. His mother, a music teacher, introduced him to gospel, the genre that forms his musical foundation. He was considered a child prodigy and at the age of nine, he was a featured musician on the weekly television program, The Gene Carroll Show.

Moving to the New York area in 1984, he taught voice and piano, as well as doing session work with such artists as Melba Moore, Freddie Jackson, and Curtis Hairston. He also formed his own group, CeCe & Company, whose repertoire included jazz and R&B tunes. Some of the group's vocalist at the time were Sybil Lynch, Adeva, and Kenny Bobien.

== Recording career ==
In 1987, Rogers recorded the track "Someday" with its songwriter, Marshall Jefferson, and was then signed to Atlantic Records, making "Someday" the first house-music song released by a major label.

Not realizing the massive appeal house music was having in Europe, Rogers moved away from the house scene and released his debut album, CeCe Rogers, in 1989. The album was a mix of contemporary R&B and house tracks that received rave reviews but poor sales. His second album, Never Give Up (1991), also failed to chart selling only 300,000 units. He was dropped from Atlantic and went back to doing session work singing backgrounds for TV commercials. In 1993, David Morales recruited Rogers to work on his debut album, Games. He worked on many of Morales's remix projects including "The Best Things In Life Are Free" by Janet Jackson and Luther Vandross, and the soundtrack of Sister Act. Rogers has written and produced many songs with his friend and business partner, Marshall Jefferson.

In 1989, Rogers wrote the UK hit single, "Got to Get You Back" for Kym Mazelle.

The house scene grew quickly, starting out in Chicago and establishing roots in New Jersey. Soulful house became popular in Europe when Rogers toured with Jefferson.

In 1994, Rogers recorded a string of hits with the Italian band Jestofunk. This would lead to three world tours. After five years with Jestofunk, Rogers decided to stop touring and give teaching a try. Seeing the need for more African American male teachers in the urban community, Rogers taught music production for eight years at the Essex County Vocational School in New Jersey. He became a supervisor for the district and formed a gospel choir that won many competitions, including the McDonald's Gospelfest and Cherry Blossom music festival.

== Discography ==
=== Albums ===
- CeCe Rogers (Atlantic, 1989)
- Never Give Up (Atlantic, 1991)
- Key of Ce (USB Records, 2017)

=== Singles ===
List of singles, with selected peak chart positions
Year	Single	Peak chart positions		Album
Year	Single	US Dance	UK	Album
1987	"Someday" (US only)	—	—	CeCe Rogers
1989	"Forever"	—	100	CeCe Rogers
1989	"Lonely Girl" (US promo only)	—	—	CeCe Rogers
1989	"Forever / Someday"	—	—	CeCe Rogers
1990	"All Join Hands"	34	—	Non-album single
1991	"Never Give Up" (US only)	—	—	Never Give Up
1991	"Thick Girlz" (US only)	—	—	Never Give Up
1992	"Brothers & Sisters" (US only)	—	—	Non-album singles
1992	"All Join Hands / Brothers & Sisters"	—	—	Non-album singles
1993	"Its Gonna Be Alright" (with The Unity Crew) (US only)	—	—	Non-album singles
1994	"No Love Lost"	15	—	Non-album singles
1995	"Come Together"	—	77	Non-album singles
1996	"In the Morning" (US only)	—	—	Non-album singles
2002	"Come On and Dance" (UK only)	—	—	Non-album singles
2005	"It's Alright" (UK only)	—	—	Non-album singles
2020	"I'll Be Your Friend" (with Benny Benassi)	—	—	Non-album singles
"—" denotes releases that did not chart or were not released.

=== As featured artist ===
List of singles as featured artist
Year	Single	Artist	Album
1994	"Say It Again"	Jestofunk	Love in a Black Dimension
1994	"Can We Live"	Jestofunk	Love in a Black Dimension
1996	"Symphonic Tonic"	Street Corner Symphony	Single only
1996	"Hollar (Throw Up Your Hands)"	Morel Inc.	N.Y.C. Jam Session
1997	"My Sweet Lord"	Papasun Style	The Positive Life
1997	"Superstar"	Project MSC	Singles only
1997	"Take Me Higher"	Inner Spirit	Singles only
1998	"Movin' On"	Moodlife	Singles only
1999	"Gimme Your Love"	Starphunk	Singles only
1999	"Happy"	Jestofunk	Universal Mother
2014	"I Want You"	Bob Sinclar	Single only
2016	"Come with Me"	David Morales	Single only
2017	"Can't Let Go"	Andrea Ferrini	Single only
