= Netsky (musician) =

Belgian drum and bass producer (born 1989)

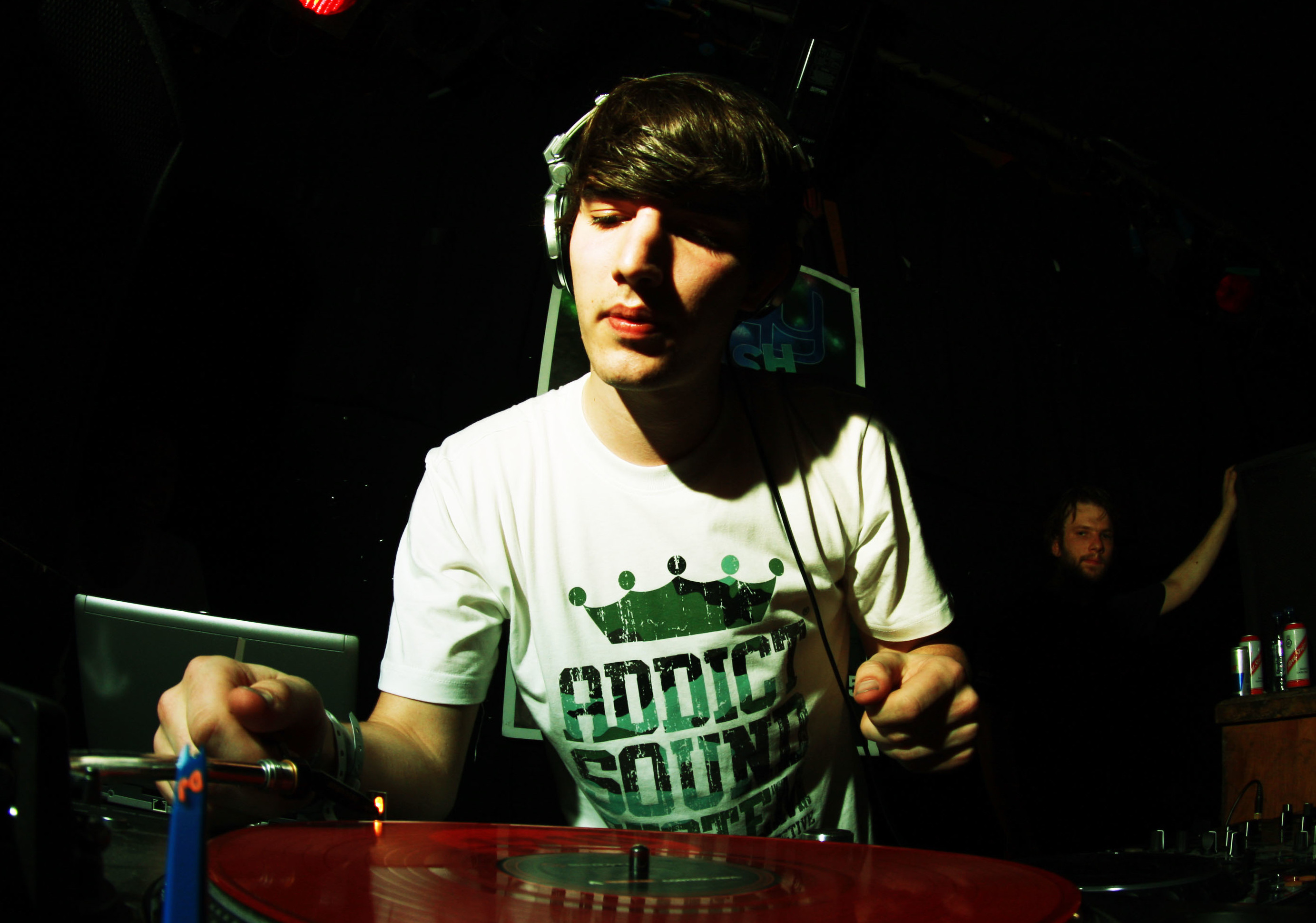
- Netsky in 2008

Background information
- Born: Boris Daenen; 22 March 1989 (age 37); Ganshoren, Brussels-Capital, Belgium
- Genres: Drum and bass; liquid funk; drumstep; trap; house; electro house
- Occupations: Record producer; DJ; keyboardist; bandleader
- Years active: 2008–present
- Labels: Helix Records (2022–present); Hospital (2009–2014, 2022); Republic (2016–2020); Sony (2014–2019)
- Website: netskymusic.com

Boris Daenen (Dutch pronunciation: [ˈboːrɪz ˈdaːnə(n)]; born 22 March 1989), better known by his stage name Netsky (/nɛtˈskaɪ/ net-SKYE), is a Belgian drum and bass producer and musician. The name Netsky is based on the computer virus of the same name.

== History ==
Netsky is an electronic music producer, artist and DJ from Belgium. He started out producing music of the liquid funk style – drum and bass music with many instrumental layers and frequent vocals. High Contrast's 'Gold Digger' remix was a major influence on him.

In late 2009, Netsky signed a recording contract with Hospital Records, the same label as other well known liquid artists such as High Contrast and London Elektricity. He also won a nomination as "Best Upcoming Producer" within just months of his first release at the 2010 Drum & Bass Arena Awards.

Hospital Records released Netsky's self-titled debut album on 31 May 2010. His second album, titled '2', was released on 25 June 2012. The album features three singles and a deluxe edition was later released supported by a fourth single, "We Can Only Live Today (Puppy)".

In 2014, Netsky signed to Epic Records / Sony Music under Ultra Music, but with a special A&R arrangement to continue connections with Hospital Records. His first release with the major was 'Running Low' featuring Beth Ditto in 2014, which hit Number 1 in the charts in Belgium and Number 21 in the UK Dance Chart.

His 2015 single 'Rio' Featuring Digital Farm Animals was released in 2015, reached number 4 in the Belgian charts, Number 29 in the UK Dance Charts and has recently been awarded Silver Status by BPI. The song was featured in the London 2016 New Year's celebrations, and was widely used on coverage throughout the 2016 Rio Olympics with Netsky awarded the honour of being chosen as the musical ambassador to the Belgian Olympic Team. 2015 also saw Netsky awarded the Flemish annual Culture Prize for music - the first time this had been awarded to a DJ and Producer.

In 2016 he released his third studio album '3' via Epic Record / Sony Music and Ultra Music. The album went to number 1 in the Belgian charts and he toured it at shows and festivals around the world culminating in a show at Sportpaleis Arena in his hometown of Antwerp in February 2017.

In 2018 Netsky signed to Republic Records, where he released singles 'Tequila Limonada' Featuring A. Chal, 'Ice Cold'; a collaboration with David Guetta, 'I Don't Even Know You Anymore' Featuring Bazzi and Lil Wayne, 'Snitch' Featuring Aloe Blacc and an EP 'Abbot Kinney' made with super producers Stargate (Rihanna, Jay Z, Coldplay).

In early 2020, to celebrate the 10th anniversary of his first album release, Netsky released drum & bass album 'Second Nature' featuring collaborations with Becky Hill, Rudimental, Montell 2099 and Hybrid Minds amongst others via Hospital Records. In 2021 Netsky premiered his 'Glasshouse' show with 2 sold out nights at Spark Arena in Auckland, New Zealand. He then went on to bring the Glasshouse to Printworks in London and Lotto Arena in Antwerp in 2022.

In 2022 Netsky signed to Helix Records where he released 'Barricades' Featuring Rita Ora which was added to the A List at BBC Radio 2.

== Netsky Live! project ==
In April 2012, during a Hospitality festival at Brixton Academy, Netsky unveiled his "Netsky LIVE!" project for the first time. Accompanied by a team of live musicians, as well as guest vocalists (of whom have sung on Netsky's catalogue of music), Netsky performs his music as a full band, taking center-stage on keyboards and synthesizers. The band toured the world performing headlining shows around the globe, as well as performing at many international music festivals, such as the Ultra Music Festival in Miami, Coachella Festival, Glastonbury in the UK and Pukkelpop in Belgium.

Netsky Live! members

- Netsky – keyboards, synthesizers, bandleader (2012–present)
- BABL – keyboards, synths (2012–2017)
- Michael Schack – drums (2012–2017)
- Script MC – MC (2012–2017)
- Diane Charlemagne – vocals (2012-2015†)
- Billie – vocals (2012–2017)

== Discography ==
=== Studio albums ===
Title	Details	Chart positions		
Title	Details	BEL (FL)	NZ	UK
Netsky	Released: 30 May 2010; Label: Hospital (NHS167); Format: LP, CD, download	24	—	—
2	Released: 25 June 2012; Label: Hospital (NHS213); Format: LP, CD, download	1	13	29
3	Released: 3 June 2016; Label: Hospital (NHS289), Sony / Epic (UK), Ultra (US); Format: LP, CD, download	1	25	109
Second Nature	Released: 30 October 2020; Label: Hospital; Format: LP, CD, download	8	16	—
"—" denotes an album that did not chart or was not released.

=== Extended plays ===
List of extended plays
Title	Details
Abbot Kinney	Released: 14 December 2018; Label: BD Music Limited; Formats: Digital download

=== Singles ===
==== As lead artist ====
Title	Year	Peak chart positions							Certifications	Album
Title	Year	BEL (FL)	AUT	FRA	GER	NL	UK	UK Dance	Certifications	Album
"Moving with You" (featuring Jenna G)	2010	64	—	—	—	—	—	—		Netsky
"Give & Take"	2012	17	—	—	—	—	196	30		2
"Come Alive"	2012	10	35	—	75	—	150	24	RMNZ: Gold	2
"Love Has Gone"	2012	14	—	—	—	93	182	33		2
"We Can Only Live Today (Puppy)" (Note: "We Can Only Live Today (Puppy)" appears on the deluxe edition of his second album 2.) (featuring Billie)	2012	8	—	63	—	—	—	—		2
"Running Low" (featuring Beth Ditto)	2014	1	—	—	100	—	80	21		Non-album single
"Rio" (featuring Digital Farm Animals)	2015	4	—	—	—	95	158	29	BPI: Silver; RMNZ: Platinum x2	3
"Work It Out" (featuring Digital Farm Animals)	2016	5	—	—	—	—	188	—		3
"Rio" (Remix) (featuring Macklemore and Digital Farm Animals)	2016	—	—	—	—	—	—	—		Non-album single
"Who Knows" (featuring Paije)	2016	30	—	—	—	—	—	—		3
"Here with You" (with Lost Frequencies)	2017	2	—	—	—	76	—	—	RMNZ: Gold	Less Is More
"Téquila Limonada" (featuring A. Chal)	2018	18	—	—	—	—	—	—		Non-album singles
"Ice Cold" (with David Guetta)	2018	71	—	—	—	—	—	—		Non-album singles
"I Don't Even Know You Anymore" (featuring Bazzi and Lil Wayne)	2019	42	—	—	—	—	—	—	RMNZ: Gold	Non-album singles
"Snitch" (with Aloe Blacc)	2019	58	—	—	—	—	—	—		Non-album singles
"I See the Future in Your Eyes"	2020	69	—	—	—	—	—	—		Second Nature
"Mixed Emotions" (featuring Montell2099)	2020	—	—	—	—	—	—	—		Second Nature
"Blend" (with Rudimental featuring Afronaut Zu)	2020	—	—	—	—	—	—	—		Second Nature
"Let Me Hold You" (with Hybrid Minds)	2020	12	—	—	—	—	—	—	RMNZ: Platinum x3	Second Nature
"Hold On" (featuring Becky Hill)	2021	45	—	—	—	—	—	—	RMNZ: Platinum x2	Second Nature
"Broken" (with Montell2099)	2022	—	—	—	—	—	—	—		Non-album singles
"Barricades" (with Rita Ora)	2022	—	—	—	—	—	—	—		Non-album singles
"Hell In High Heels" (featuring Jazmine Johnson)	2023	—	—	—	—	—	—	—	RMNZ: Platinum	Non-album singles
"Nobody Likes the Records That I Play" (with Dillon Francis)	2024	—	—	—	—	—	—	—		Non-album singles
"California" (featuring Cloves)	2025	—	—	—	—	—	—	—		TBA
"Out of Body" (with Andromedik)	2025	—	—	—	—	—	—	—		TBA
"Remember"	2025	—	—	—	—	—	—	—		TBA
"Light That Leads Me" (with Bebe Rexha)	2025	—	—	—	—	—	—	—		TBA
"—" denotes single that did not chart or was not released.

==== As featured artist ====
Year	Title	Peak chart positions			Album
Year	Title	BEL (FL)	UK	UK Dance	Album
2011	"Tonight" (Danny Byrd featuring Netsky)	75	91	11	Rave Digger

==== Promotional singles ====
Year	Title	Peak chart positions	Album
Year	Title	BEL (FL)	Album
2010	"Iron Heart"	72	Netsky
2013	"Without You"	—	Non-album singles
2014	"Can't Speak" (with Metrik featuring Stealth)	—	Non-album singles
2016	"Higher" (with Jauz)	19	3
2016	"Forget What You Look Like" (featuring Lowell)	—	3
2016	"TNT" (featuring Dave 1 from Chromeo)	—	3
2022	"Barricades" (with Rita Ora)	44	Non-album single
"—" denotes single that did not chart or was not released.

=== Remixes ===
Year	Artist	Remix	Appears on
2009	Miike Snow	Black & Blue (Netsky Remix)	Black and Blue (Remixes)
2010	Chew Lips	Karen (Netsky Remix)	Karen
2010	Mutated Forms	Glory Days (Never Again) (Netsky Remix)	Time to Shine
2010	Underworld (featuring High Contrast)	Scribble (Netsky Remix)	Scribble
2010	Pendulum	Witchcraft (Netsky Remix)	Witchcraft
2010	Swedish House Mafia	One (Netsky Remix)	One (Your Name)
2010	Die + Interface (featuring William Cartwright)	Bright Lights (Netsky Remix)	Bright Lights
2010	Plan B	The Recluse (Netsky Remix)	The Recluse
2010	New Zealand Shapeshifter	The Touch (Netsky Remix)	The System Is a Remix
2010	Leftfield	Release the Pressure (Netsky Remix)	—N/a
2011	Shameboy	Strobot (Netsky Remix)	Radar Remixes 01; 2 Deluxe
2011	Rusko	Everyday (Netsky Remix)	Everyday
2011	Jessie J	Nobody's Perfect (Netsky Remix)	Nobody's Perfect (digital EP); Domino (CD single)
2011	Skream (featuring Sam Frank)	Anticipate (Netsky Remix)	Anticipate
2011	Rusko	Everyday (Netsky VIP Remix)	Fifteen Years of Hospital Records
2012	Netsky	Love Has Gone (Netsky's "Love Must Go On" Refix)	Love Has Gone
2012	Madeon	Finale (Netsky Remix)	The City
2012	Netsky	Wanna Die for You (Metrik and Netsky Rework)	2 Deluxe
2014	Ed Sheeran	Don't (Netsky Remix)	—N/a
2014	Jack Ü (featuring Kiesza)	Take Ü There (Netsky Remix)	Take Ü There (Remixes)
2017	Dua Lipa	Be The One (Netsky Remix)	—N/a
2018	Elias	Focus (Netsky Remix)	—N/a
2019	Netsky (featuring Bazzi and Lil Wayne)	I Don't Even Know You Anymore (Netsky's Powerline Remix)	I Don't Even Know You Anymore (Remixes)
2021	Keys N Krates (featuring Ambré Perkins)	Glitter (Netsky Remix)	—N/a

=== Other releases ===
2009

- Crystal Clear & Netsky – "King of the Stars" [Liq-weed Ganja Recordings]
- Netsky – "Starlight" / "Young and Foolish" [Allsorts]
- Netsky – "Lost in This World" (b/w "Life" by KG) [Talkin Beatz]
- Netsky – "Prisma" / "Tomorrow's Another Day" [Liq-weed Ganja Recordings]
- Netsky – "Hold on to Love" (b/w "Generations (S.P.Y Remix)" by BCee) [Future Retro]
- Netsky – "Everyday" / "Come Back Home" [Liq-weed Ganja Recordings]

2010

- Netsky – "I Refuse" / "Midnight Express" [Spearhead Records]
- Netsky – "Eyes Closed" / "Smile" [Allsorts]
- Netsky – "I Refuse (Shock One Remix)" / "Hold on To Love (Cyantific Remix)" [Spearhead Records]
- Netsky – "Your Way" / "Daydreaming" [Radar Records]
- Mutated Forms & Netsky featuring Sofia Rubina – "Windows" [Allsorts]

=== Guest appearances ===
2009

- Strength in Numbers EP (by Crystal Clear) – Netsky – "Come Back Home" [Frontline Records]

2010

- Hospital Mix.Eight (mixed by Logistics) – Netsky – "Memory Lane" [Hospital Records]
- This is Drum + Bass (presented by Hospitality) – Netsky – "Smile" [Hospital Records]
- Sick Music 2 – Netsky – "Memory Lane" [Hospital Records]
- Drum & Bass Arena Anthology – Netsky – "I Refuse" [Hospital Records]

2011

- Fifteen Years of Hospital Records – Netsky – "Secret Agent" [Hospital Records]

2014

- Hospital: We Are 18 – Netsky – "Love Life" [Hospital Records]

2015

- Fast Soul Music – Netsky – "Memory Lane" [Hospital Records]
