= Un-Cut =

British musical group

- Origin: Manchester, England
- Genres: Electronic, drum and bass, nu jazz, liquid funk, trip hop
- Years active: 2001–2004
- Members: Jenna Gibbons; Future Cut: Darren Lewis; Iylola Babatunde Babalola

Un-Cut were a British band from Manchester, England, composed of Darren Lewis and Tunde Babalola (2D) from the music production duo Future Cut, and vocalist Jenna Gibbons (Jenna G).

== History ==
In 2001, prior to forming Un-Cut, First Cut and Jenna G first collaborated on the single "Obsession", which was released through drum and bass label Metalheadz. It was a number one hit on the UK Dance Chart.

In March 2003, Un-Cut reached number 26 on the UK Singles Chart with "Midnight", originally released on their own label, Wired, and selling over 10,000 copies. They were subsequently signing with WEA. They released an album titled The Un-Calculated Some (2003) on WEA. Their follow-up single, "Fallin'", appeared in the UK chart at number 63 for one week in June 2003, and the group were subsequently dropped by their label.

== Reception ==
Chimp, a Manchester-based magazine, said Un-Cut were notable for their "more 'liquid', funkier, soul vision of D'n'B at a time of prevailing darkness within the genre". Drum and Bass UK said: "Un-Cut combined lush vocal melodies with intricate electronic production, creating a unique blend of drum and bass, R&B, and soul."

== Legacy ==
From 2004, as Future Cut, Lewis and Babilola moved into production, mixing and songwriting, working with artists such as Shakira, Rihanna, Kelly Rowland, Paloma Faith, Kelis, Nicole Scherzinger, Dizzee Rascal, and Olly Murs. In 2006, they achieved a UK number 1 as co-writers on Lily Allen's single "Smile".

Jenna G continues to work as a singer-songwriter, DJ, and actor. In 2006, she released her solo album For Lost Friends. She also hosted a Saturday morning show on Radio 1Xtra and has worked with the likes of Chase and Status, Disclosure, Frankie Knuckles, Goldie, Netsky, Shy FX, and Zed Bias. As an actor, she has appeared in Shameless and Danny Boyle's TV film Strumpet (BBC 2) with Christopher Eccleston.
