= Underworld discography =

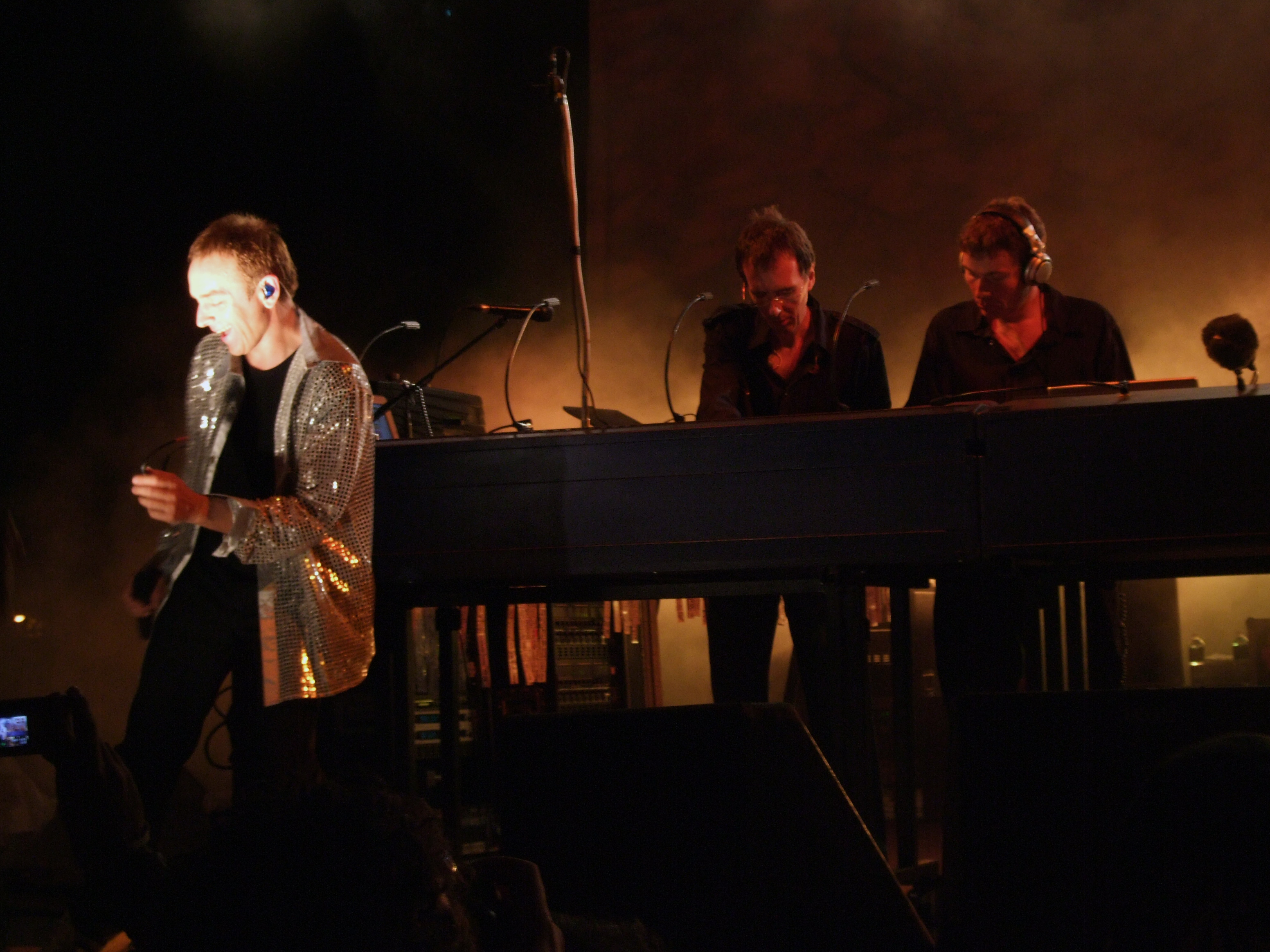
- Underworld live in New York, 2007. Left to right: Karl Hyde, Rick Smith, Darren Price.
- Studio albums: 11
- Extended plays: 5
- Soundtrack albums: 5
- Live albums: 20
- Compilation albums: 5
- Singles: 46
- Video albums: 9

Underworld are a British electronic group, and principal name under which duo Karl Hyde and Rick Smith have recorded together since 1983, though they have also worked together under various names both before and after adopting the Underworld moniker. The first two albums they recorded together were with the band Freur.

== Albums ==
=== Studio albums ===
Title	Information	Peak chart positions									Certifications (sales thresholds)
Title	Information	UK	AUS	BEL	FRA	GER	JPN	NL	SWE	US	Certifications (sales thresholds)
Underneath the Radar	Released: 16 February 1988; Label: Sire; Format: CD, LP, cassette	—	32	—	—	—	—	—	—	139	ARIA: Gold
Change the Weather	Released: 4 September 1989; Label: Sire; Format: CD, LP	—	64	—	—	—	—	—	—	—	
Dubnobasswithmyheadman	Released: 24 January 1994; Label: Junior Boy's Own; Format: CD, LP, cassette	12	—	132	—	—	—	71	—	—	BPI: Gold
Second Toughest in the Infants	Released: 11 March 1996; Label: Junior Boy's Own; Format: CD, LP, cassette	9	—	23	—	—	—	43	17	—	BPI: Gold
Beaucoup Fish	Released: 1 March 1999; Label: Junior Boy's Own; Format: CD, LP, MD, cassette	3	7	2	34	22	17	22	22	93	BEA: Gold; BPI: Gold; RIAJ: Gold
A Hundred Days Off	Released: 16 September 2002; Label: Junior Boy's Own; Format: CD, LP	16	24	6	42	34	7	9	49	122	BPI: Silver; RIAJ: Gold
Oblivion with Bells	Released: 3 October 2007; Label: PIAS; Format: CD, LP, digital download	45	—	27	134	76	6	15	—	169	
Barking	Released: 13 September 2010; Label: Cooking Vinyl; Format: CD, LP, digital download	26	46	26	—	73	5	27	—	151	
Barbara Barbara, We Face a Shining Future	Released: 18 March 2016; Label: Caroline International; Format: CD, LP, digital download	10	36	7	158	44	14	12	—	200	
Drift Series 1	Released: 1 November 2019; Label: Caroline International; Format: CD, LP, digital download	68	—	89	—	—	—	60	—	—	
Strawberry Hotel	Released: 25 October 2024; Label: Virgin Music; Format: CD, LP, digital download	43	—	142	—	—	—	63	—	—	
"—" denotes a title that was not released or did not chart in that territory.

=== Compilation albums ===
Title	Information	Peak chart positions				Certifications (sales thresholds)
Title	Information	UK	BEL	JPN	NL	Certifications (sales thresholds)
1992–2002	Released: 3 November 2003; Label: Junior Boy's Own; Format: CD, LP	43	25	4	61	BPI: Silver; RIAJ: Gold
The Bells the Bells	Released: 25 June 2008; Label: Traffic Inc.; Format: CD	—	—	117	—	
1992–2012 The Anthology	Released: 4 December 2011; Label: Cooking Vinyl; Format: Digital download, CD	—	78	—	—	
A Collection	Released: 4 December 2011; Label: Cooking Vinyl; Format: Digital download, CD	—	—	—	—	
A Collection 2	Released: 18 March 2016; Label: Universal Music Catalogue; Format: Digital download	—	—	—	—	
"—" denotes a title that was not released or did not chart in that territory.

=== Soundtracks ===
Title	Information
Wordimagesoundplay	Released: 2004; Label: Sony Music Japan; Format: PS2 DVD-ROM
Breaking and Entering: Music from the Film (with Gabriel Yared)	Released: 6 November 2006; Label: V2 Records; Format: CD
Sunshine: Music from the Motion Picture (with John Murphy)	Released: 25 November 2008; Label: Fox Music; Format: Digital download
Frankenstein: Music from the Play	Released: 17 March 2011; Label: Underworldlive.com; Format: CD, digital download
Manchester Street Poem: Installation Score	Released: 13 June 2019; Label: Underworldlive.com; Format: Digital download

=== Live albums ===
Title	Year	Peak chart positions						
Title	Year	UK	AUS	BEL	GER	JPN	NL	US
Everything, Everything	2000	22	40	17	37	22	12	192
Live in Tokyo 25th November 2005	2005	—	—	—	—	—	—	—
Birmingham Academy. England 9.10.2007	2007	—	—	—	—	—	—	—
Glasgow Academy. Scotland 13.10.2007	2007	—	—	—	—	—	—	—
Manchester Apollo. England 16.10.2007	2007	—	—	—	—	—	—	—
London Roundhouse. England 17.10.2007	2007	—	—	—	—	—	—	—
London Roundhouse. England 18.10.2007	2007	—	—	—	—	—	—	—
Live at The Oblivion Ball, Makuhari Messe, Tokyo, Japan 24.11.2007	2007	—	—	—	—	66	—	—
Köln Palladium. Germany 28.01.2008	2008	—	—	—	—	—	—	—
Rotterdam Massilo. Holland 29.01.2008	2008	—	—	—	—	—	—	—
Amsterdam Heineken Music Hall. Holland 30.01.2008	2008	—	—	—	—	—	—	—
Ancienne Belgique, Brussels. Belgium 31.01.2008	2008	—	—	—	—	—	—	—
London Roundhouse. England 28.02.2008	2008	—	—	—	—	—	—	—
London Roundhouse. England 29.02.2008	2008	—	—	—	—	—	—	—
Brixton Academy, London, England. 31.10.2008	2008	—	—	—	—	—	—	—
Brixton Academy, London, England. 01.11.2008	2008	—	—	—	—	—	—	—
iTunes Festival: London 2010	2010	—	—	—	—	—	—	—
Live from the Roundhouse	2011	—	—	—	—	63	—	—
Live at Summer Sonic 2016	2016	—	—	—	—	—	—	—
RicksDubbedOutDriftExperience (Live in Amsterdam)	2020	—	—	—	—	—	—	—
"—" denotes a title that was not released or did not chart in that territory.

== Extended plays ==
Title	Information	Peak chart positions
Title	Information	UK
Lovely Broken Thing	Released: 9 November 2005; Label: Underworldlive.com; Format: Digital download	—
Pizza for Eggs	Released: 7 December 2005; Label: Underworldlive.com; Format: Digital download	—
I'm a Big Sister, and I'm a Girl, and I'm a Princess, and This Is My Horse	Released: 5 June 2006; Label: Underworldlive.com; Format: Digital download	—
The Misterons Mix	Released: 10 July 2006; Label: Underworldlive.com; Format: Digital download	—
Teatime Dub Encounters (with Iggy Pop)	Released: 27 July 2018; Label: Caroline International; Format: LP, CD, digital download	20
Drift Episode 1: Dust	Released: 6 December 2018; Label: Smith Hyde Productions; Format: Digital download	—
Drift Episode 2: Atom	Released: 7 March 2019; Label: Smith Hyde Productions; Format: streaming	—
"—" denotes a title that was not released or did not chart in that territory.

== Singles ==
=== As Underworld ===
Title	Year	Peak chart positions							Certifications (sales thresholds)	Album
Title	Year	UK	AUS	GER	JPN	NLD	US	US Dance	Certifications (sales thresholds)	Album
"Underneath the Radar"	1988	—	5	—	—	—	74	—		Underneath the Radar
"Glory! Glory!"	1988	—	64	—	—	—	—	—		Underneath the Radar
"Show Some Emotion"	1988	—	88	—	—	—	—	—		Underneath the Radar
"I Need a Doctor"	1989	—	—	—	—	—	—	—		Underneath the Radar
"Stand Up"	1989	—	79	—	—	—	67	—		Change the Weather
"Thrash"	1989	—	147	—	—	—	—	—		Change the Weather
"Change the Weather"	1990	—	—	—	—	—	—	—		Change the Weather
"Mother Earth" / "The Hump"	1992	—	—	—	—	—	—	—		Dubnobasswithmyheadman
"Mmm... Skyscraper I Love You"	1993	—	—	—	—	—	—	—		Dubnobasswithmyheadman
"Rez"	1993	196	—	—	—	—	—	—		Non-album singles
"Spikee" / "Dogman Go Woof"	1993	63	—	—	—	—	—	—		Non-album singles
"Dark & Long"	1994	57	—	—	—	—	—	—		Dubnobasswithmyheadman
"Cowgirl"	1994	196	—	—	—	—	—	21		Dubnobasswithmyheadman
"Dirty Epic"	1994	—	—	—	—	—	—	—		Dubnobasswithmyheadman
"Born Slippy"	1995	52	—	—	—	—	—	—		Non-album single
"Rowla"	1996	—	—	—	—	—	—	—		Second Toughest in the Infants
"Pearl's Girl"	1996	22	—	—	—	—	—	—		Second Toughest in the Infants
"Born Slippy Nuxx"	1996	2	20	13	98	30	—	27	BPI: 2× Platinum; RMNZ: Platinum	Trainspotting: Music from the Motion Picture
"Confusion the Waitress"	1996	—	—	—	—	—	—	—		Second Toughest in the Infants
"Juanita"	1997	—	—	—	—	—	—	—		Second Toughest in the Infants
"Moaner"	1997	79	—	69	—	—	—	—		Beaucoup Fish
"Push Upstairs"	1999	12	78	—	—	79	—	38		Beaucoup Fish
"Jumbo"	1999	21	96	—	—	—	—	18		Beaucoup Fish
"King of Snake"	1999	17	82	—	—	—	—	—		Beaucoup Fish
"Bruce Lee"	1999	—	—	—	—	—	—	—		Beaucoup Fish
"Cowgirl (Live)"	2000	24	166	—	—	79	—	—		Everything, Everything
"Two Months Off"	2002	12	71	98	62	54	—	2		A Hundred Days Off
"Dinosaur Adventure 3D"	2002	34	—	—	—	—	—	6		A Hundred Days Off
"Born Slippy .Nuxx 2003"	2003	27	—	—	29	—	—	9		1992–2002
"JAL to Tokyo"	2005	—	—	—	—	—	—	—		Non-album singles
"Vanilla Monkey"	2006	—	—	—	—	—	—	—		Non-album singles
"Play Pig"	2006	—	—	—	—	—	—	—		Non-album singles
"Peggy Sussed"	2006	—	—	—	—	—	—	—		Non-album singles
"Crocodile"	2007	93	—	—	—	—	—	16		Oblivion with Bells
"Boy, Boy, Boy"	2007	—	—	—	—	—	—	—		Oblivion with Bells
"Beautiful Burnout"	2008	—	—	—	—	—	—	—		Oblivion with Bells
"Ring Road"	2008	—	—	—	—	—	—	—		Oblivion with Bells
"020202"	2008	—	—	—	—	—	—	—		Non-album singles
"Phonestrap"	2008	—	—	—	—	—	—	—		Non-album singles
"Holding the Moth"	2008	—	—	—	—	—	—	—		Oblivion with Bells
"Scribble"	2010	—	109	—	—	—	—	—		Barking
"Always Loved a Film"	2010	—	—	—	—	—	—	—		Barking
"Bird 1"	2010	—	—	—	—	—	—	—		Barking
"Diamond Jigsaw"	2011	—	—	—	—	—	—	—		Barking
"Caliban's Dream"	2012	12	—	—	—	—	—	—		Isles of Wonder
"Rez (Bassnectar Remix)"	2013	—	—	—	114	—	—	—		Non-album single
"I Exhale"	2016	—	—	—	—	—	—	—		Barbara Barbara, We Face a Shining Future
"If Rah"	2016	—	—	—	—	—	—	—		Barbara Barbara, We Face a Shining Future
"Nylon Strung"	2016	—	—	—	—	—	—	—		Barbara Barbara, We Face a Shining Future
"Ova Nova"	2016	—	—	—	—	—	—	—		Barbara Barbara, We Face a Shining Future
"Long Slow Slippy"	2017	—	—	—	—	—	—	—		Non-album singles
"Brilliant Yes That Would Be"	2018	—	—	—	—	—	—	—		Non-album singles
"Bells & Circles"	2018	—	—	—	—	—	—	—		Teatime Dub Encounters
"Get Your Shirt"	2018	—	—	—	—	—	—	—		Teatime Dub Encounters
"G-Town Euphoria (Luna)" (with Kettama)	2023	—	—	—	—	—	—	—		Non-album single
"And the Colour Red"	2023	—	—	—	—	—	—	—		Strawberry Hotel
"Denver Luna"	2023	—	—	—	—	—	—	—		Strawberry Hotel
"Black Poppies"	2024	—	—	—	—	—	—	—		Strawberry Hotel
"Fen Violet" (with Kettama)	2024	—	—	—	—	—	—	—		Non-album single
"—" denotes a single that was not released or did not chart in that territory.

=== As The Screen Gemz ===
- "I Can't Stand Cars / Teenage Teenage" (1979)

=== As Lemon Interupt ===
- "Eclipse / Big Mouth" (1992)
- "Dirty / Minniapolis" (1992)
- "Dirty Guitar" (1992)

== Videography ==
- Kiteless (1996)
- Footwear Repairs by Craftsmen at Competitive Prices (1997)
- Beaucoup Video (1999)
- Everything, Everything (2000)
- Book of Jam – Video (2007)
- The Bells the Bells (2008)
- Barking: The Films (2010)
- Live from the Roundhouse (2011)
- Drift Series 1 Films (2019)

== Other appearances ==
=== Soundtracks ===
- "Promised Land" was recorded for the 1990 erotic film Wild Orchid.
- "Oh" was recorded for the 1997 romantic/black comedy film A Life Less Ordinary.
- "Moaner" was recorded for the 1997 superhero film Batman & Robin. The song is available on the film's soundtrack album, and was also released as a single and included, somewhat shortened, on Beaucoup Fish.
- "8 Ball" was recorded for the 2000 drama film The Beach, and available on the film's soundtrack album, released by London Records in the UK. It also later appeared on the 1992–2002 compilation.

=== Compilations ===
- "Second Hand" is a significant re-working of "Thing in a Book" which appeared exclusively on Café del Mar, Volume 1.
- "To Heal (And Restore Broken Bodies)" appears on Songs for Tibet: The Art of Peace.

=== Collaborations ===
- "Downpipe" is a Mark Knight, D. Ramirez single, featuring Underworld.
- "The First Note Is Silent" is a High Contrast single, featuring Tiësto and Underworld.
- "Two Hundred & Thirty Eight Days" is a High Contrast song, featuring Underworld.
- "Ten" is a Sander Van Doorn & Mark Knight single, featuring Underworld.
- "Baby Wants To Ride" – originally by Frankie Knuckles – is a single featuring the collaborative efforts of Underworld, Pete Heller, Terry Farley and The Misterons.
- "Too Little Too Late" is a Joris Voorn song, featuring Underworld.
- "Friends at the Pigshed" is a Brutalismus 3000 song, featuring Underworld
- "Arp12" is a KI/KI single, featuring Underworld.

== Remixes ==
Year	Artist/Band	Song
1990	Yen	Escape (The Rix Mix)
1992	108 Grand	Te quiero (Darren Emerson Underworld Remix)
1992	108 Grand	Te quiero (Darren Emerson Strutt Remix)
1992	Eagles Prey	Tonto's Drum (Darren Emerson Remix)
1992	Gat Decor	Passion (Darren Emerson Mix)
1992	Gat Decor	Passion (Darren Emerson Edit)
1992	Odd Company	Swing in Trance (Effective Mix)
1992	Odd Company	Swing in Trance (Naked Mix)
1992	Shakespears Sister	Black Sky (Dub Extravaganza Part 1/Green Eyed dub)
1992	Shakespears Sister	Black Sky (Dub Extravaganza Part 2)
1992	Simply Red	Thrill Me (Steppin' Razor Ambient Mix)
1992	Simply Red	Thrill Me (Steppin' Razor Mix)
1992	Simply Red	Thrill Me (Steppin' Razor Ambient Instrumental Mix)
1992	Spooky	Schmoo (Steppin' Razor Mix)
1992	Spooky	Schmoo (Underworld Mix)
1992	Trinity	So Real (More Real Mix)
1992	Trinity	So Real (Surreal Mix)
1993	Björk	Human Behaviour (Underworld Dub Mix 1)
1993	Björk	Human Behaviour (Underworld Dub Mix 2)
1993	Björk	Human Behaviour (Underworld Mix)
1993	Drum Club	Sound System (Underworld Mix)
1993	Leftfield	Song of Life (Steppin' Razor Mix)
1993	Leftfield	Song of Life (Lemon Interrupt Mix)
1993	Mental Generation	Café del mar (Underworld Dub Heaven)
1993	Mental Generation	Café del mar (Underworld Remix)
1993	One Dove	Why Don't You Take Me? (Underworld Remix)
1993	One Dove	Why Don't You Take Me? (Underworld 'Up 2 Down' Mix)
1993	Orbital	Lush 3-3 (Underworld Mix)
1993	Orbital	Lush 3-3 (Underworld Early Fade)
1993	William Orbit	Water from a Vine Leaf (Underwater Mix Part 1)
1993	William Orbit	Water from a Vine Leaf (Underwater Mix Part 2)
1993	William Orbit	Water from a Vine Leaf (Underworld Remix)
1994	Quasar	Sunflower (co-written & vocals by Karl Hyde)
1994	Saint Etienne	Pale Movie (Lemonentry Mix)
1994	Saint Etienne	Urban Clearway (Produced by Rick Smith)
1994	Saint Etienne	Like a Motorway (Produced by Rick Smith)
1994	Sven Väth	Harlequin – The Beauty and the Beast (Underworld Remix)
1994	Sven Väth	Harlequin – The Beauty and the Beast (Underworld Alternative Remix)
1995	Dreadzone	Zion Youth (Underworld Mix)
1995	Dreadzone	Zion Youth (Underworld Dub)
1995	Front 242	Happiness (Underworld Dance Mix)
1995	Front 242	Happiness (Underworld Dub Mix)
1995	Model 500	The Flow (Underworld Mk.1 Mix)
1995	Model 500	The Flow (Underworld Mk.2 Mix)
1995	Saint Etienne	Cool Kids of Death (Underworld Mix)
1996	Chemical Brothers	Leave Home (Underworld Mix I)
1996	Chemical Brothers	Leave Home (Underworld Mix II)
1996	Tata Box Inhibitors	Protein (Darren Emerson Underwater Remix)
1997	Björk	I Miss You (Underwater Mix)
1997	Depeche Mode	Barrel of a Gun (Underworld Hard Mix)
1997	Depeche Mode	Barrel of a Gun (Underworld Soft Mix)
1997	Depeche Mode	Barrel of a Gun (Underworld Hard Instrumental Mix)
1997	Everything but the Girl	Before Today (Darren Emerson Underwater Remix 1)
1997	Everything but the Girl	Before Today (Darren Emerson Underwater Remix 2)
1997	Massive Attack	Risingson (Underworld Remix)
1997	Quazar	Confusing the Sun (co-written & vocals by Karl Hyde)
1997	Rob & Goldie	The Shadow (Process Mix Edit)
1997	Rob & Goldie	The Shadow (Process Mix) (remixed by Rick Smith for Underworld)
1997	Rob & Goldie	The Shadow (Bing Here Mix) (remixed by Rick Smith for Underworld)
2008	Oakenfold	Feed Your Mind (Underworld Remix) (featuring Spitfire)
2009	Manic Street Preachers	William's Last Words (Underworld Remix)
2011	David Lynch	Good Day Today (Underworld Classic Remix)
2015	Manic Street Preachers	William's Last Words (Underworld mix r37br11)
2021	Halsey	I Am Not a Woman, I'm a God (Underworld's Drift Mix)
2024	Yungblud	breakdown. (Underworld Rework)
2024	Brutalismus 3000	alleswirdgut (Underworld Remix)
