= Everything, Everything (album) =

Live album by Underworld
- Released: 4 September 2000
- Recorded: 22 May 1999, Brussels, Belgium
- Genres: Techno, progressive house, progressive trance
- Length: 75:25
- Label: JBO
- Producer: Rick Smith

Underworld chronology
| Beaucoup Fish (1999) | Everything, Everything (2000) | A Hundred Days Off (2002) |

Professional ratings
Aggregate scores
| Source | Rating |
|---|---|
| Metacritic | 77/100 |
Review scores
| Source | Rating |
| AllMusic | 4/5 stars |
| The A.V. Club | favorable |
| Drowned in Sound | 8/10 |
| Mixmag | 5/5 stars |
| Mojo | 4/5 stars |
| NME | 8/10 |
| Pitchfork | 7.7/10 |
| Release Magazine | 7/10 |
| Select | 4/5 medals |
| The Village Voice | favorable |

Everything, Everything is a live album by Underworld, released 4 September 2000 on Junior Boy's Own. The album is named after the lyrics in one of the songs, "Cowgirl".

A companion DVD was released separately soon after the album's release. The DVD features live footage of the band mixed with videography and artistic effects by the design group Tomato, with Jono Griffith of Ernest Edits as 'Creative Editor'. The DVD also features several songs not on the album – "Moaner", "Puppies", "Kittens", and "Rowla".

== Reception ==
Select gave the album a four out of five rating, stating that "like most live LPs this is ultimately an artefact for fans rather than newcomers, but it's quite some artefact".

== Track listing ==
=== CD ===
All songs by Underworld unless noted

1. "Juanita / Kiteless" – 12:35
2. "Cups" – 3:26
3. "Push Upstairs" – 7:28
4. "Pearl's Girl" – 8:17
5. "Jumbo" – 8:33
6. "Shudder / King of Snake" (Bellotte/Moroder/Summer/Underworld) – 12:17
7. "Born Slippy .NUXX" – 10:56
8. "Rez / Cowgirl" – 11:47

=== DVD ===
1. "Opening Credits" – 0:38
2. "Intro" – 0:21
3. "Juanita / Kiteless" – 11:36
4. "Cups" – 3:26
5. "Push Upstairs" – 7:28
6. "Pearl's Girl" – 8:17
7. "Jumbo" – 8:33
8. "Shudder/King of Snake" (Bellotte/Moroder/Summer/Underworld) – 12:17
9. "Born Slippy .NUXX" – 10:56
10. "Rez / Cowgirl" – 11:47
11. "Moaner" – 8:45
12. "Ending Credits" – 4:29 (features an instrumental of the song "Puppies" from the "Pearl's Girl" single)

==== Bonus Tracks ====
The bonus tracks are presented with a slideshow of monochromatic patterns.

1. "Kittens" – 8:47
2. "Rowla" – 7:48
3. "Outtakes" – 3:57

== Personnel ==
- Tommy Morrison – assistant engineer
- Darren Emerson – programming
- Karl Hyde – vocals, guitar, programming
- Mike Nielsen – engineer, mixing
- Rick Smith – programming, producer
- John Coulling – technical assistance
- Robin Kelly – technical assistance
- Will Shapland – engineer
- Ian Sylvester – consultant
- Colin Birch – technical assistance
- Rob Buckler – technical assistance
- Phil Dore – spoken word
- Mike Gillespie – project coordinator
- Murray Harris – consultant
- Stuart Kelling – spoken word
- Ollie Meacock – mastering, assistant engineer
- Tim Shaxson – technical assistance
- Stuart Thomas – technical assistance

== Charts ==
| Chart (2000) | Peak position |
|---|---|
| Australian Albums Chart | 40 |
| Belgian Albums Chart | 17 |
| Canada Top Albums/CDs (RPM) | 13 |
| Dutch Albums Chart | 12 |
| German Albums Chart | 37 |
| New Zealand Albums (RMNZ) | 17 |
| Scottish Albums (Official Charts) | 21 |
| UK Albums Chart | 22 |
| UK Independent Albums (Official Charts) | 2 |
| US Billboard 200 | 192 |
