= Beaucoup Fish Singles =

Box set by Underworld
- Released: 7 December 1999
- Recorded: 1997–99
- Genre: Progressive house, progressive trance, electronica
- Length: 117:08
- Label: Junior Boys Own/V2
- Producer: Rick Smith, Karl Hyde, Darren Emerson

Underworld chronology
| Bruce Lee (1999) | Beaucoup Fish Singles (1999) | 8 Ball (2000) |

Professional ratings
Review scores
| Source | Rating |
|---|---|
| AllMusic | 4/5 stars |
| Starpulse | 4.5/5 stars |
| Alternative Press | 4/5 stars |

Beaucoup Fish Singles is a CD box set that includes the four Beaucoup Fish (1999) CD singles condensed onto three CDs, released in the US/Canada only. White box with a blue sticker "Limited Edition includes Fatboy Slim Remix ECD and previously unreleased remixes." The three CDs are in slim jewel cases with the original "King of Snake", "Jumbo", and "Push Upstairs" CD sleeve artwork.

== Track listings ==
=== 3xCD: JBO/V2, 63881-27622-2A-C (US/CA) ===
Disc one

1. "King of Snake (Straight [Mate] Mix)" - 3:51
2. "King of Snake (Barking Mix)" - 3:52
3. "King of Snake (Fatboy Slim Remix)" - 6:57
4. "King of Snake (Slam Remix)" - 7:17
5. "King of Snake (Dave Clarke Remix)" - 6:01
6. "King of Snake (Video)"

Enhanced CD containing a music video for "King of Snake (Barking Mix)" in QuickTime format.

Disc two

1. "Push Upstairs" - 4:34
2. "Push Upstairs (Adam Beyer Remix 1)" - 4:56
3. "Push Upstairs (Roger S Blue Plastic People Mix)" - 8:13
4. "Push Upstairs (Darren Price Remix)" - 6:47
5. "Please Help Me" - 7:29
6. "Bruce Lee (Short Version)" - 2:58
7. "Bruce Lee (The Micronauts Remix)" - 8:54
8. "Bruce Lee (Dobropet)" - 4:20

Disc three

1. "Jumbo (Edit)" - 4:07
2. "Jumbo (Rob Rives & Francios K. Main Dish)" - 8:26
3. "Jumbo (Jedis Electro Dub Mix)" - 6:02
4. "Jumbo (Future Shock Worlds Apart Mix)" - 6:30
5. "Jumbo (Jedis Sugar Hit Mix)" - 6:28
6. "Cups (Salt City Orchestra's Vertical Bacon Vocal)" - 9:23
