= Yen (disambiguation) =

The Japanese yen is the unit of currency in Japan (since 1871).

Yen or YEN may also refer to:

== Currency ==
- Japanese military currency (1937–1945), currency issued to Imperial Japanese soldiers in its occupied territories
- Korean yen, the currency of Korea from 1910–1945
- Taiwanese yen, the currency of Taiwan from 1895–1946
- Yen and yuan sign (¥), symbol for currency

== Other uses ==
- Yẽn, a local name for Kathmandu
- Yan (surname) or Yen
- Yen (band), a German rock band
- Yen (song), a song by Slipknot from the 2022 album The End, So Far
- YEN, the IATA code of Estevan Regional Aerodrome
- Yen Chia-kan (1905–1993), former President of the Republic of China
- Yen Santos (born 1992), Filipina actress
- Youth Employment Network, a joint UN-ILO-World Bank jobs program
- Jaydes, an American rapper

== See also ==
- Yuan (disambiguation)
