= Essgee =

Essgee may be:

- Essgee Entertainment an Australian theatrical production company
- A tradename used by Siebe Gorman (a British engineering company that developed diving gear)
- Ess Gee, a song by Underworld from their album A Hundred Days Off
