= Damaging Consent =

Studio album by The Micronauts
- Released: September 28, 2007
- Genre: Electronica / acid techno
- Length: 69:00 (Disc 1); 74:00 (Disc 2)
- Label: Citizen Records
- Producer: The Micronauts

The Micronauts chronology
Bleep to Bleep (2000)	Damaging Consent (2007)	Head Control Body Control (2018)

Damaging Consent was the second full album from The Micronauts, released in 2007. It is the first major work released by the group since George Issakidis left the group, leaving Christophe Monier as its sole member. It was released as a two-disc edition with the second disc featuring ten remixes as a retrospective.

== Track listing ==
=== Disc 1 ===
All tracks by The Micronauts

1. "Action (Intro)" – 0:24
2. "Reaction" – 7:25
3. "Distracted" – 5:30
4. "The Beat [Remix]" – 7:44
5. "Superstar" – 3:53
6. "I Wanna Be Yours [Album Edit]" – 6:25
7. "Sweat [Album Version]" – 6:55
8. "Sweet [Remix]" – 7:48
9. "Quaalude [Interlude]" – 0:46
10. "Cinecitta [Finale]" - 6:24
11. "Altitude [Interlude]" - 0:22
12. "Get Down" - 5:46
13. "Drug" - 0:25
14. "High Rise" - 9:02
15. "Eros [Outro]" - 0:28

=== Disc 2 ===
All tracks remixed by The Micronauts

1. "Bruce Lee [The Micronauts Remix]" - 8:56 (original by Underworld)
2. "Block Rockin' Beats [The Micronauts Remix]" - 9:52 (original by The Chemical Brothers)
3. "Water Ride [The Micronauts Remix]" - 9:59 (original by 16B)
4. "Jet Set [The Micronauts Remix]" - 7:53 (original by The Strike Boys)
5. "Electricity [The Micronauts Remix]" - 8:38 (original by Orchestral Manoeuvres in the Dark)
6. "Miss You [The Micronauts Remix]" - 6:38 (original by Mirwais)
7. "Bollywood" - 6:25
8. "A.C. Anthem [The Micronauts Remix]" - 5:56 (original by Jean Nipon)
9. "Dirge [The Micronauts Remix]" - 6:39 (original by Death in Vegas)
10. "Block Rockin' Beats [The Micronauts Bonus Beats]" - 3:46 (original by The Chemical Brothers)
