= Two Months Off =

2002 single by Underworld

Single by Underworld

from the album A Hundred Days Off
- B-side: "Headset"; "Tiny Clicks"
- Released: 28 August 2002
- Length: 9:09; 3:57 (radio edit)
- Label: JBO; V2
- Songwriters: Rick Smith; Karl Hyde
- Producers: Rick Smith; Karl Hyde

Underworld singles chronology
"Cowgirl" (live) (2000)	"Two Months Off" (2002)	"Dinosaur Adventure 3D" (2002)

"Two Months Off" is a song by British electronic music group Underworld, released as the lead single from their sixth album, A Hundred Days Off, in August 2002. This track was one of the first songs that they released as a duo. The single peaked at number 12 on the UK Singles Chart as well as number two on the US Billboard Dance Club Play chart.

A short spoken word vocal section can be heard above the track lead-in. The contributing artist for these vocals is Juanita Boxill, whose voice also features in "Little Speaker", track five of A Hundred Days Off. Boxill is the namesake of separate Underworld single "Juanita / Kiteless / To Dream of Love". A stripped-down and slightly sonically reworked version of the song's bridge features in "And I Will Kiss" and "Caliban's Dream", songs written by Smith for the 2012 Summer Olympics opening ceremony.

== Track listings ==
UK CD1

1. "Two Months Off" (radio edit) – 3:58
2. "Two Months Off" (King Unique Sunspots Vocal mix) – 8:17
3. "Headset" – 5:58

UK CD2

1. "Two Months Off" – 9:09
2. "Two Months Off" (John Ciafone Vocal remix) – 7:32
3. "Tiny Clicks" – 2:13

UK 12-inch single 1

1. "Two Months Off" – 9:09
2. "Two Months Off" (King Unique Sunspots vocal mix) – 8:17

UK 12-inch single 2

1. "Two Months Off" (John Ciafone Vocal remix) – 7:32
2. "Two Months Off" (John Ciafone Vocal mix 2) – 7:00

== Charts ==
=== Weekly charts ===
Weekly chart performance for "Two Months Off"
Chart (2002)	Peak position
Australia (ARIA)	71
Belgium (Ultratip Bubbling Under Flanders)	12
Europe (Eurochart Hot 100)	42
Germany (GfK)	98
Italy (FIMI)	46
Netherlands (Single Top 100)	54
Scotland Singles (OCC)	13
UK Singles (OCC)	12
UK Dance (OCC)	1
UK Indie (OCC)	1
US Dance Club Songs (Billboard)	2

=== Year-end charts ===
Year-end chart performance for "Two Months Off"
Chart (2002)	Position
US Dance Club Play (Billboard)	9

== Release history ==
Release dates and formats for "Two Months Off"
Region	Date	Format(s)	Label(s)	Ref.
Japan	28 August 2002	CD	JBO; V2	
Australia	2 September 2002	CD	JBO; V2	
United Kingdom	2 September 2002	12-inch vinyl 1; CD	JBO; V2	
United Kingdom	30 September 2002	12-inch vinyl 2	JBO; V2	
