= Rowla =

Single by Underworld

from the album Second Toughest in the Infants
- B-side: "Juanita"
- Released: 1995
- Genre: Progressive house
- Length: 6:31
- Label: Wax Trax!
- Songwriter(s): Rick Smith, Karl Hyde, Darren Emerson
- Producer(s): Rick Smith, Karl Hyde, Darren Emerson

Underworld singles chronology
| "Born Slippy" (1995) | "Rowla" (1995) | "Pearl's Girl" (1996) |

"Rowla" is the title of a promotional 1996 single release and a song by Underworld, from their album Second Toughest in the Infants. The song is the final version of "Cherry Pie" from the "Pearl's Girl" single.

== Track listing ==
Promo single

1. "Rowla" – 6:31
2. "Juanita" – 16:36

== Appearances ==
- "Rowla" appears on Second Toughest in the Infants.
