= The Micronauts =

French Touch electronic dance music act (1995 to present)

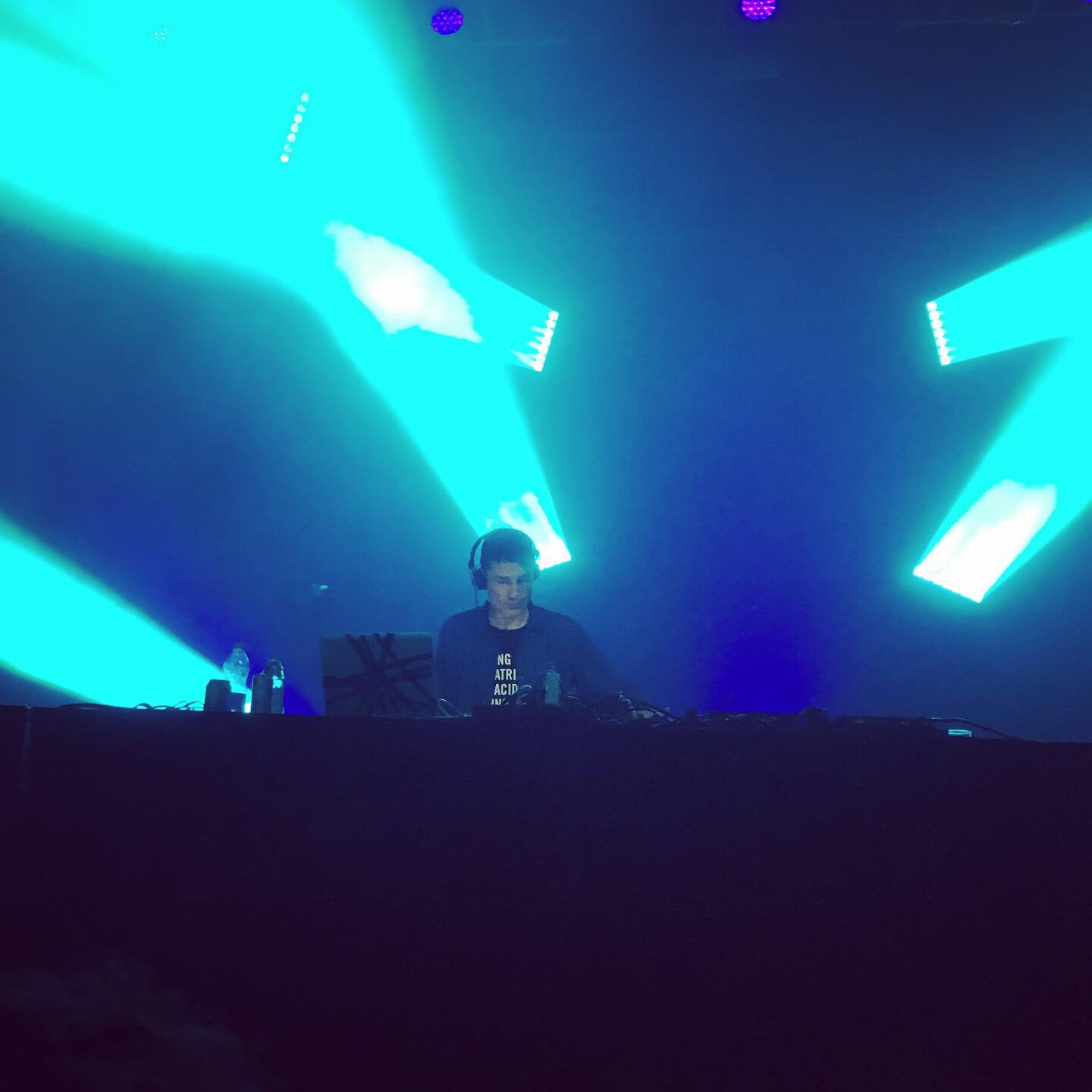

Background information
- Origin: Paris, France
- Genres: Techno, electronica
- Instruments: Roland TB-303, Roland TB-606
- Years active: 1995-present
- Labels: Loaded Records, Phono, Science/Virgin, Radical Silence, Micronautics, Citizen Records
- Members: Christophe Monier
- Past members: George Issakidis

The Micronauts are a Paris-based electronic dance music act founded in 1995. The group are part of the French dance music movement from the 1990s to 2000s dubbed French Touch. The original Micronauts line-up consisted of Christophe Monier and the Canadian-born George Issakidis. Monier and Issakidis met whilst working at the Parisian music fanzine eDEN.

The Micronauts' debut track Get Funky Get Down was originally released in 1995 on the London-based Phono label. The single features Daft Punk’s first-ever remix, along with the original version and the B-side “Back To The Bioship”. The Nature 1994 Cassette Version, recorded as its name implies in 1994 on a cassette tape, was only included on a 2017 release on the Micronautics label.

The second release was a 12 inch called The Jazz / The Jam (1995). The duo continued to work throughout the 1990s, developing an acid techno style of their own. Their work attracted the attention of high-profile artists, such as The Chemical Brothers, Underworld and Orchestral Manoeuvres in the Dark (OMD). Indeed, their remix of "Block Rockin' Beats" appears on The Chemical Brothers' DJ mix album Brothers Gonna Work It Out. The Micronauts' remixes of Underworld's "Bruce Lee" and OMD's "Electricity" were also distributed commercially.

In 1999, The Micronauts were signed to Science, a sub-label of Virgin UK, distributed in the US through Astralwerks. The Jag was released this same year. In 2000, the band released their debut EP, Bleep to Bleep. Group member, George Issakidis, left The Micronauts project shortly after.

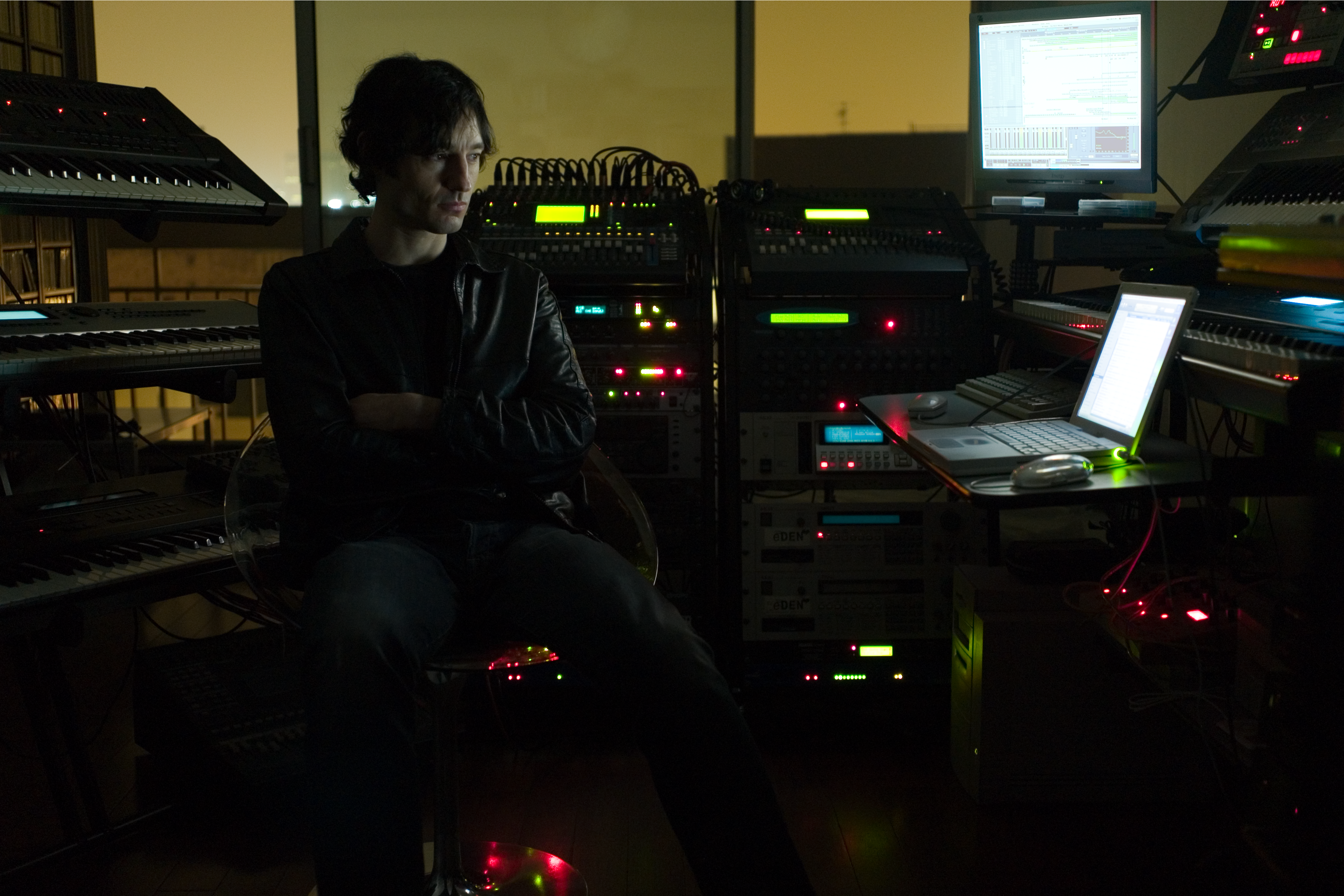
Christophe Monier (The Micronauts) in his recording studio in Paris, 2007.

Monier continues to record, produce, tour, perform live and work under the name of The Micronauts. In 2003, he remixed Mirwais' "Miss You" and Madonna's "Hollywood". In 2004, Monier founded The Micronautics label. On 28 September 2007, he released a new album, Damaging Consent with a bonus ten track remix retrospective.

In June 2018, Monier released the single Acid Party on his Micronautics label. The album Head Control Body Control followed in December.

== Selected discography ==
=== Studio albums ===
- Bleep to Bleep [2000]
- Damaging Consent [2007]
- Head Control Body Control [2018]

=== EPs ===
- Anarchie - High Rise / Get Down / Sinecitta [2004]
- I Wanna Be Your Toy - I Wanna Be Yours (Pt. 1) / (Pt.2) / (Pt.3) / I Wanna Be Your Toy / High Rye [2004]
- Sweat - Sweat / Cinecitta Minimale / Cinecitta / Sweat Relax Instru [2005]
- Off The Beaten Track - The Beat / Sweet / Beaten [2006]
- Damaging Consent EP - Reaction / Distracted / Underworld - Bruce Lee (The Micronauts Remix) [2007]

=== Singles ===
- "Get Funky Get Down" [1995]
- "The Jazz" / "The Jam" [1995]
- "The Jag" [1996]
- "Baby Wants To Rock" [2000]
- "Hoochie Coochie" [2012]
- "Acid Party" [2018]
