= Juanita/Kiteless/To Dream of Love =

Single by Underworld

from the album Second Toughest in the Infants
- Released: 1996
- Genre: Progressive house
- Length: 16:35; 3:49 (promotional single version)
- Label: Junior Boy's Own
- Songwriters: Rick Smith, Karl Hyde, Darren Emerson
- Producers: Rick Smith, Karl Hyde, Darren Emerson

Underworld singles chronology
"Born Slippy .NUXX" (1996)	"Juanita/Kiteless/To Dream of Love" (1996)	"Moaner" (1997)

"Juanita/Kiteless/To Dream of Love" (or simply "Juanita") is a 1996 house song written and performed by the British electronic band Underworld, the opening track of the album Second Toughest in the Infants (1996). The first portion of the track, "Juanita", was released as a promotional single release.

The band also released different mixes of the track, including a live version on the 2000 live album Everything, Everything, and as "Juanita 2022", on a May 2022 EP.

== Background ==
The album version of the track is titled "Juanita/Kiteless/To Dream of Love", as "Juanita" forms only the first part of three in the track, with "Kiteless" and "To Dream of Love" pushing it to its length of over sixteen minutes. The "Promo Short Cut" version included on the promotional single cuts down the six-minutes "Juanita" part, and edits and fades it out to 3:49.

The song was the regular set-opener of their Second Toughest in the Infants and Beaucoup Fish tours. It is named after Juanita Boxill, who later contributed spoken word vocals for their album A Hundred Days Off. The 2000 live album Everything, Everything, which documents the Beaucoup Fish tour, features a version which includes "Juanita" and "Kiteless" only, and runs to 12:35.

== Reviews ==
In a 2016 rundown of the band's best tracks on Stereogum, music critic Sean T Collins rated "Juanita" as "the single strongest argument for [Underworld's] genius", and noted: "The song concludes with one of Karl Hyde’s most effective deployments of his observational writing technique: He simply sat and recorded himself listing the colors of passing cars, played it back at high speed, slowing down the occasional entry in the list as if it contained some special, unknowable meaning."

== Juanita 2022 ==
In May 2022, the band released a new remix of the song titled "Juanita 2022", on an EP alongside the live version of "Juanita/Kiteless" from the 2000 live album Everything, Everything.

== Track listing ==
=== Promo single ===
No.	Title	Length
1.	"Juanita" (promo short cut)	3:49
2.	"Juanita/Kiteless/To Dream of Love"	16:35

=== Juanita 2022 EP ===
No.	Title	Length
1.	"Juanita 2022"	12:23
2.	"Juanita" (Everything, Everything live version)	12:35
