= Second Toughest in the Infants =

Studio album by Underworld
- Released: 11 March 1996
- Recorded: 1994–1995
- Studio: Lemonworld Studios, London
- Genre: Electronic; techno; progressive house; breakbeat; ambient; downtempo; experimental
- Length: 73:01
- Label: Junior Boy's Own
- Producer: Underworld

Underworld chronology
Dubnobass- withmyheadman (1994)	Second Toughest in the Infants (1996)	Beaucoup Fish (1999)

Singles from Second Toughest in the Infants
- 1. "Pearl's Girl" Released: May 1996, October 1996 (re-issue); 2. "Rowla" Released: 1996; 3. "Juanita" Released: 1996 (promo only)

Alternative cover
- Vinyl edition

Second Toughest in the Infants is the fourth studio album by British electronic music group Underworld, and the second in their "MK2" line-up with Darren Emerson. With this album, Underworld expanded on their progressive palette, while developing their signature sound of abrasive beats and anthemic melodies. The name of the album derives from a comment made by member Rick Smith's six-year-old nephew, Simon Prosser, when asked on his progress at infant school (the level of schooling attended by four- to seven-year-old children in the United Kingdom). Second Toughest featured the single "Pearl's Girl". The re-issue featured the band's best known single, "Born Slippy .NUXX".

The album was remastered and re-released on 20 November 2015 with deluxe and super-deluxe expanded editions.

== Overview ==
The album opens with the multi-song suite "Juanita : Kiteless : To Dream of Love", which features all three parts intersecting each other at various points during the piece; hence, the use of colons instead of slashes in its name. The loungy, drum and bass track "Banstyle" follows, alongside its downtempo, half-speed counterpart "Sappy's Curry". The rest of the record showcases advancements in the Underworld sound: both "Rowla" and "Pearl's Girl" feature club-ready abrasive beats and basslines, while "Blueski" and "Stagger" incorporate live acoustic guitar and light, melancholic arrangements, respectively. "Pearl's Girl" is one of the few Underworld songs to use breakbeats.

Due to the success of the single "Born Slippy .NUXX", Second Toughest was re-issued with a bonus disc containing the single-only tracks "Born Slippy .NUXX" and "Rez"; Japanese editions also featured "Cherry Pie" and the "(Carp Dreams... Koi)" mix of "Pearl's Girl".

The song titles "Sappy's Curry", "Pearl's Girl" and "Born Slippy" all come from the names of greyhounds from an English racing stadium. These greyhounds finished third, second, and first during Underworld's visit to the races.

== Critical reception ==
Professional ratings
Contemporary reviews
Review scores
Source	Rating
AllMusic	5/5 stars
Encyclopedia of Popular Music	5/5 stars
Entertainment Weekly	B+
The Guardian	5/5 stars
Muzik	5/5
NME	8/10
The Rolling Stone Album Guide	4/5 stars
Select	5/5
Uncut	8/10
The Village Voice	C+

Like their previous effort Dubnobasswithmyheadman, Second Toughest in the Infants received critical acclaim. Anya Sacharow of Entertainment Weekly described the album as "no dumb-bass dance music", adding that Underworld "know how to expand the frenzy of techno and jungle and then retreat to an ambient cool". Melody Maker called Underworld "modest/cynical/smart enough to borrow jungle's finest trademarks", while NME praised them as "smooth of touch, sleek of footing and downright slippery of rhythm" and concluded that they "breezily persevere in their quest for Western groove domination." Stephen Thomas Erlewine of AllMusic said that Second Toughest in the Infants "carries the same knockout punch of their debut, Dubnobasswithmyheadman, but it's subtler and more varied, offering proof that the outfit is one of the leading dance collectives of the mid-'90s."

Melody Maker named Second Toughest in the Infants the fifth best album of 1996, and the album was also ranked at number 37 in NME's 1996 critics' poll. In 2006, the album was ranked at number 96 on Mojo's list of "Modern Classics", with an accompanying write-up stating: "Everything with Underworld is in the detail – never has the introduction of a hi-hat seemed quite so exciting." The album is featured in the book 1001 Albums You Must Hear Before You Die.

In a retrospective review, AllMusic critic Paul Simpson said that "Second Toughest in the Infants endures as a landmark album, spotlighting Underworld at their creative peak, and remaining an important document of an era when experimental, cerebral electronic dance music received significant mainstream attention."

=== 2015 reissue ===
Professional ratings
Retrospective reviews
Review scores
Source	Rating
The Guardian	4/5 stars
The Line of Best Fit	9.5/10
Louder than War	10/10
Mojo	(2015) (2025)
Pitchfork	8.8/10
PopMatters	10/10
Q	4/5 stars
Record Collector	4/5 stars
Uncut	9/10

In 2015, the album was reissued on vinyl and 2-CD and 4-CD expanded editions. Highlighting alternate mixes, remixes and unreleased songs, the 4-CD version includes a full CD of variations of "Born Slippy .NUXX", from one of the song's earliest versions in 1994, up until its final form a year later (which is included here in its 1996 extended form).

== Track listing ==
No.	Title	Writer(s)	Length
1.	"Juanita: Kiteless: To Dream of Love"	Darren Emerson; Karl Hyde; Rick Smith	16:36
2.	"Banstyle/Sappy's Curry"	Emerson; Hyde; Smith	15:22
3.	"Confusion The Waitress"	Emerson; Hyde; Smith	6:47
4.	"Rowla"	Hyde; Smith	6:31
5.	"Pearl's Girl"	Emerson; Hyde; Smith	9:36
6.	"Air Towel"	Hyde; Smith	7:37
7.	"Blueski"	Hyde; Smith	2:55
8.	"Stagger"	Hyde; Smith	7:37

Reissue bonus CD
No.	Title	Writer(s)	Length
1.	"Born Slippy .NUXX"	Emerson; Hyde; Smith	11:40
2.	"Rez"	Hyde; Smith	9:55

Japanese reissue bonus CD
No.	Title	Writer(s)	Length
3.	"Cherry Pie"	Emerson; Hyde; Smith	8:25
4.	"Pearl's Girl" (Carp Dreams... Koi)	Hyde; Smith	10:06

20th anniversary 2-CD deluxe edition CD 2
No.	Title	Length
1.	"Born Slippy" (Instrumental Version)	8:31
2.	"Cherry Pie"	8:26
3.	"Oich Oich"	8:34
4.	"Puppies"	3:53
5.	"Mosaic"	5:00
6.	"Deep Arch"	8:24
7.	"Confusion The Waitress" (She Said)	4:54
8.	"Rowla A1806"	3:58
9.	"Pearls" (Version 2)	8:10
10.	"Born Slippy (Nuxx)"	11:48

=== 20th anniversary 4-CD super deluxe edition ===
CD 2: Extra Tracks & Mixes/Remixes
No.	Title	Length
1.	"Cherry Pie"	8:26
2.	"Oich Oich"	8:34
3.	"Puppies"	3:53
4.	"Mosaic"	5:00
5.	"Deep Arch"	8:24
6.	"Pearls Girl" (Tin There)	8:16
7.	"Pearls Girl" (14996 Version)	9:05
8.	"Born Slippy" (Instrumental Version)	8:31
9.	"Born Slippy" (Deep Pan)	10:00

CD 3: Unreleased Demos/Outtakes
No.	Title	Length
1.	"Bug"	6:56
2.	"Confusion The Waitress" (She Said)	4:54
3.	"D+B Thing"	7:16
4.	"D'Arbly St."	7:34
5.	"4 Crowns"	2:17
6.	"Rowla" (A1806)	3:58
7.	"Bing Here"	9:43
8.	"Techno Thang"	6:26
9.	"Pearls Ver2"	8:10
10.	"Bloody 1"	16:15

CD 4: The Evolution of Born Slippy .NUXX (Various Versions Both Live & Studio)
No.	Title	Length
1.	"Nuxx" (A1796)	8:45
2.	"Nuxx" (A2221 UW Live (2 Sets) Leicester M Dog 94)	12:33
3.	"Nuxx" (A4712 Live @ Zap Club Brighton Feb94)	11:31
4.	"Nuxx" (A4733 UW Live Amsterdam Apr94)	9:21
5.	"Nuxx" (Liquid Room 94 A2254 UW Live Liquid Room 2 Tokyo)	11:31
6.	"Nuxx" (from A1825)	6:11
7.	"Born Slippy (Nuxx)"	11:48

== Charts ==
=== Weekly charts ===
Chart (1996)	Peak position
Belgian Albums (Ultratop Flanders)	23
Dutch Albums (Album Top 100)	43
Scottish Albums (OCC)	9
Swedish Albums (Sverigetopplistan)	17
UK Albums (OCC)	9

Chart (1999)	Peak position
UK Independent Albums (OCC)	50

Chart (2015)	Peak position
UK Dance Albums (OCC)	22

=== Year-end charts ===
Chart (1996)	Position
UK Albums (OCC)	79

== Certifications and sales ==
Region	Certification	Certified units/sales
United Kingdom (BPI)	Gold	100,000^{^}
United States	—	88,000
^{^} Shipments figures based on certification alone.
