= Dinosaur Adventure 3D =

2002 single by Underworld

Single by Underworld

from the album A Hundred Days Off
- B-side: "Ansum", "Like a Swimmer"
- Released: 11 December 2002
- Label: Junior Boy's Own
- Songwriters: Rick Smith, Karl Hyde
- Producers: Rick Smith, Karl Hyde

Underworld singles chronology
"Two Months Off" (2002)	"Dinosaur Adventure 3D" (2002)	"Born Slippy .NUXX 2003" (2003)

"Dinosaur Adventure 3D" is the second single by Underworld from their album A Hundred Days Off. The single, released in December 2002, peaked on the UK Singles Chart at number 34.

== Music video ==
The video for the song begins with a gradually zooming-out shot of a beehive. A swarm of mechanical bees then emerge from the hive and attack a city. A large amount of papers blow around a fleeing man, while the bees watch. The bees then kidnap several people. Following are multiple shots of the bees flying over scenery, taking everyone they see. The kidnapped people then emerge from water, their ultimate fate unknown. The bees return to their hive.

== Track listings ==
CD: Junior Boy's Own, JBO5020523 (UK) Part 1/2

1. "Dinosaur Adventure 3D (Radio Edit)" - 3:39
2. "Ansum" - 16:16

CD: Junior Boy's Own, JBO5020528 (UK) Part 2/2

1. "Dinosaur Adventure 3D (R.C.M. Version)" - 8:09
2. "Like A Swimmer" - 5:25
3. "Dinosaur Adventure 3D (Funk D'Void Vocal Remix)" - 6:16

CD: Junior Boy's Own, JBO5022063 (Europe)

1. "Dinosaur Adventure 3D (Radio Edit)" - 3:39
2. "Dinosaur Adventure 3D (R.C.M. Version)" - 8:09
3. "Dinosaur Adventure 3D (Funk D'Void Vocal Remix)" - 7:53
4. "Ansum" - 16:16

CD: V2, V2CP 142 (JP)

1. "Dinosaur Adventure 3D (Radio Edit)" - 3:39
2. "Dinosaur Adventure 3D (R.C.M. Version)" - 8:09
3. "Dinosaur Adventure 3D (Funk D'Void Vocal Remix)" - 7:53
4. "Dinosaur Adventure 3D (Darren Price Remix)" - 7:24

12-inch: Junior Boy's Own, JBO5020526 (UK)

1. "Dinosaur Adventure 3D (R.C.M. Version)" - 8:09
2. "Dinosaur Adventure 3D (Funk D'Void Vocal Remix)" - 6:16
- The "Funk D'Void Vocal Remix" had to be edited down so that the CD complied with UK chart rules of 20 minutes; the full version of this track appears on the Australian 'AHDO' tour edition 2×CD set.

== Charts ==
Chart (2003)	Peak position
UK Singles (Official Charts)	34
US Dance Club Songs (Billboard)	6
