= Bleep to Bleep =

Studio album by The Micronauts
- Released: March 29, 2000
- Genre: Electronica / acid techno
- Length: 44:30
- Label: Science/Virgin
- Producer: The Micronauts

The Micronauts chronology
The Jag (1999)	Bleep to Bleep (2000)	Anarchie (2004)

Professional ratings
Review scores
Source	Rating
AllMusic	4/5 stars
The Encyclopedia of Popular Music	4/5 stars

Bleep to Bleep is the debut album by the Micronauts, released in 2000. It showcases the duo's raw, electronic and rhythmic style.

== Critical reception ==
The Herald wrote that "the Micronauts are of prime interest to young rips who start dancing whenever a car alarm goes off, but Bleep To Bleep is OK for sentient humans, too."

== Track listing ==
All tracks by The Micronauts

1. "Baby Wants to Bleep, Part 1" – 4:38
2. "Baby Wants to Rock" – 2:35
3. "Baby Wants to Bleep, Part 2" – 3:21
4. "Baby Wants to Bleep, Part 3" – 1:55
5. "Bleeper 0+2" – 7:10
6. "Baby Wants to Bleep, Part 4" – 2:42
7. "Bleep to Bleep" – 2:56
8. "Baby Wants to Bleep [K]" – 8:19
9. "Bleeper" – 10:51

== Personnel ==
- George Issakidis – Producer
- Nilesh "Nilz" Patel – Mastering
