= Bruce Lee (song) =

Single by Underworld

from the album Beaucoup Fish
- B-side: "Cups (Salt City Orchestra's Vertical Bacon Vocal)"
- Released: 15 November 1999
- Genre: Experimental hip hop, electronica, industrial rock
- Length: 4:41
- Label: Junior Boy's Own
- Songwriters: Rick Smith, Karl Hyde, Darren Emerson
- Producers: Rick Smith, Karl Hyde, Darren Emerson

Underworld singles chronology
"King of Snake" (1999)	"Bruce Lee" (1999)	"Beaucoup Fish Singles" (1999)

"Bruce Lee" is a song by Underworld that appears on the album Beaucoup Fish. The song did not chart (and only the 12" single was eligible to do so, as the CD format exceeded the time limit), but was notable for its remix by The Micronauts, which did have some minor success.

== Track listings ==
=== CD: Junior Boy's Own; JBO5010116P (UK) ===
1. "Bruce Lee" – 4:42
2. "Bruce Lee" (The Micronauts Remix) – 8:56
3. "Cups" – 11:45
4. "Cups" (Salt City Orchestra's Vertical Bacon Vocal) – 9:23

=== CD: Junior Boy's Own; JBO5010033 (UK) ===
1. "Bruce Lee" (Short) – 3:00
2. "Bruce Lee" (The Micronauts Remix) – 8:56
3. "Cups" (Salt City Orchestra's Vertical Bacon Vocal) – 9:23
4. "Bruce Lee" (Dobropet) – 4:10

=== 12": Junior Boy's Own; JBO5010036 (UK) ===
1. "Bruce Lee" (The Micronauts Remix) – 8:56
2. "Cups" (Salt City Orchestra Vertical Bacon Vocal) – 9:23

=== CD: V2 Records Japan; V2CI 62 (JP) ===
1. "Bruce Lee" (Short) – 2:59
2. "Bruce Lee" (The Micronauts Mix) – 8:57
3. "Bruce Lee" (Buffalo Daughter Mix) – 4:21
4. "Cups" (Salt City Orchestra's Vertical Bacon Remix) – 9:23
5. "Bruce Lee" (album version) – 4:41
6. "Bruce Lee" (Dobropet) – 4:10

=== Junior Boy's Own; JBO5011253P (UK) ===
1. "Bruce Lee" (Short) – 2:59

== Appearances ==
- "Bruce Lee" appears on the album Beaucoup Fish.
- "Bruce Lee" also appears on the final episode of season 3 of Chris Morris' Blue Jam radio program.
