= Jumbo (Underworld song) =

Single by Underworld

from the album Beaucoup Fish
- Released: 24 May 1999
- Genre: Electronic; ambient techno
- Length: 6:58 (original); 4:06 (edit)
- Label: Junior Boys Own
- Songwriters: Rick Smith, Karl Hyde, Darren Emerson
- Producers: Rick Smith, Karl Hyde, Darren Emerson

Underworld singles chronology
"Push Upstairs" (1999)	"Jumbo" (1999)	"King of Snake" (1999)

"Jumbo" is a song by Underworld that appears on the album Beaucoup Fish. The single peaked on the UK Singles Chart at number 21.

== Track listings ==
=== CD : Junior Boy's Own; JBO5007193 (UK) Part 1/2 ===
1. "Jumbo (Edit)" – 4:07
2. "Jumbo (Rob Rives & Francois K Main Dish)" – 8:26
3. "Jumbo (Jedis Electro Dub Mix)" – 6:02

=== CD : Junior Boy's Own; JBO5007203 (UK) Part 2/2 ===
1. "Jumbo" – 6:58
2. "Jumbo (Jedis Sugar Hit Mix)" – 6:28
3. "Jumbo (Future Shock Worlds Apart Mix)" – 6:30

=== CD : Junior Boy's Own; JBO5008553 (SE) ===
1. "Jumbo (Edit)" – 4:07
2. "Jumbo (Jedis Sugar Hit Mix)" – 6:28

=== CD : Junior Boy's Own; JBO5008313 (AU) ===
1. "Jumbo (Edit)" – 4:07
2. "Jumbo (Rob Rives & Francois K Main Dish)" – 8:26
3. "Jumbo (Jedis Electro Dub Mix)" – 6:02
4. "Jumbo (Future Shock Worlds Apart Mix)" – 6:30
5. "Jumbo (Jedis Sugar Hit Mix)" – 6:28

=== CD : V2 Records; V2CI39 (JP) ===
1. "Jumbo (Edit)" – 4:07
2. "Jumbo (Rob Rives & Francois K Main Dish)" – 8:26
3. "Jumbo (Jedis Electro Dub Mix)" – 6:02
4. "Jumbo (Future Shock Worlds Apart Mix)" – 6:30
5. "Jumbo (Jedis Sugar Hit Mix)" – 6:28
6. "Jumbo (Album Version) – 6:58

=== CD : V2 Records; 63881-27622-2C (US) as part of the Beaucoup Fish Singles box set ===
1. "Jumbo (Edit)" – 4:07
2. "Jumbo (Rob Rives & Francois K Main Dish)" – 8:26
3. "Jumbo (Jedis Electro Dub Mix)" – 6:02
4. "Jumbo (Future Shock Worlds Apart Mix)" – 6:30
5. "Jumbo (Jedis Sugar Hit Mix)" – 6:28
6. "Cups (Salt City Orchestra's Vertical Bacon Vocal)" – 9:23

=== CD : Junior Boy's Own; JBO5008173P (UK) promo ===
1. "Jumbo (Radio Edit)" – 3:57

=== 12" : Junior Boy's Own; JBO5007196 (UK) ===
1. "Jumbo (Rob Rives & Francois K. Main Dish Mix)" – 6:51
2. "Jumbo (Jedis Sugar Hit Mix)" – 6:29
3. "Jumbo (Future Shock Worlds Apart Mix)" – 6:30

=== 2x12" : V2; 63881-27629-1 (US) ===
1. "Jumbo (Rob Rives & Francois K Main Dish)" – 8:30
2. "Jumbo (Future Shock Worlds Apart Mix)" – 6:30
1. "King of Snake (Straight (Mate) Mix)" – 3:51
2. "King of Snake (Fatboy Slim Remix)" – 6:56

=== 2x12" : Junior Boy's Own; JBO5007706P (UK) promo ===
1. "Jumbo" – 6:56
2. "Jumbo (Rob Rives & Francois K Prelude)" – 1:56
3. "Jumbo (Rob Rives & Francois K Main Dish)" – 8:30
1. "Jumbo (Jedis Sugar Hit Mix)" – 8:05
2. "Jumbo (Future Shock Worlds Apart Vox)" – 8:12

== Charts ==
Chart (1999)	Peak position
Australia (ARIA)	96
Belgium (Ultratip Bubbling Under Flanders)	12
Scotland Singles (OCC)	29
UK Singles (OCC)	21
UK Dance (OCC)	4
UK Indie (OCC)	5
US Dance Club Songs (Billboard)	18

== Notes ==
- The Rob Rives+Francois K Prelude only appears on the promo 12", along with longer versions of the Jedi's Sugar Hit Dub and Future Shock Worlds Apart Vox remixes.
