= King of Snake =

Single by Underworld

from the album Beaucoup Fish
- Released: 16 August 1999
- Genre: Progressive trance big beat (Fatboy Slim remix)
- Length: 8:56
- Label: Junior Boy's Own
- Songwriters: Rick Smith, Karl Hyde, Darren Emerson, Giorgio Moroder, Peter Bellotte, Donna Summer
- Producers: Rick Smith, Karl Hyde, Darren Emerson

Underworld singles chronology
"Jumbo" (1999)	"King of Snake" (1999)	"Bruce Lee" (1999)

Professional ratings
Review scores
Source	Rating
Pitchfork Media	(9.5/10)

"King of Snake" is a song by Underworld. It was played live many times in improv versions, then released on two promo-only 12-inch singles. This was the second single released from the album Beaucoup Fish. The song contains an interpolation of the bassline from the Donna Summer single "I Feel Love". The single peaked on the UK Singles Chart at number 17.

== Track listings ==
CD : Junior Boy's Own; JBO5008793 (UK) Part 1/2

1. "King of Snake (Straight (Mate) mix)" – 3:51
2. "King of Snake (Fatboy Slim remix)" – 6:56
3. "King of Snake (Slam remix)" – 7:31

CD : Junior Boy's Own; JBO5008798 (UK) Part 2/2

1. "King of Snake (Barking mix) – 3:53
2. "King of Snake (Ashley Beedle's Save Our Discos re-edit)" – 8:31
3. "King of Snake (Dave Clarke remix) – 6:03

- "King of Snake (Barking mix)" (Video)

CD : Junior Boy's Own; JBO5009623 (SE)

1. "King of Snake (Straight (Mate) mix)" – 3:51
2. "King of Snake (Fatboy Slim remix)" – 6:56

CD : Junior Boy's Own; JBO5010853 (IT)

1. "King of Snake (Straight (Mate) mix)" – 3:51
2. "King of Snake (Barking mix) – 3:53
3. "King of Snake (Fatboy Slim remix)" – 6:56
4. "King of Snake (Dino Lenny remix)" – 7:58
5. "King of Snake (Coccoluto remix)" – 8:34
6. "King of Snake (Martinez Orchestramix) – 8:04

- "King of Snake (Barking mix)" (Video)

CD : Junior Boy's Own; JBO5009573 (AU)

1. "King of Snake (Straight (Mate) mix)" – 3:51
2. "King of Snake (Barking mix) – 3:53
3. "King of Snake (Fatboy Slim remix)" – 6:56
4. "King of Snake (Ashley Beedle's Save Our Discos re-edit)" – 8:31
5. "King of Snake (Slam remix)" – 7:31
6. "King of Snake (Dave Clarke remix) – 6:03

- "King of Snake (Barking mix)" (Video)

CD : V2 Japan; V2CI 49 (JP)

1. "King of Snake (Straight (Mate) mix)" – 3:51
2. "King of Snake (Fatboy Slim remix)" – 6:56
3. "King of Snake (Ashley Beedle's Save Our Discos re-edit)" – 8:31
4. "King of Snake (Dave Clarke remix) – 6:03
5. "King of Snake (Barking mix) – 3:53
6. "King of Snake (Slam remix)" – 7:31
7. "King of Snake (original version)" – 8:56

- "King of Snake (Barking mix)" (Video)

CD : V2; 63881-27622-2A (US) as part of the Beaucoup Fish Singles box set

1. "King of Snake (Straight (Mate) mix)" – 3:51
2. "King of Snake (Barking mix) – 3:53
3. "King of Snake (Fatboy Slim remix)" – 6:56
4. "King of Snake (Slam remix)" – 7:31
5. "King of Snake (Dave Clarke remix) – 6:03

- "King of Snake (Barking mix)" (Video)

CD : Junior Boy's Own; (UK) promo

1. "King of Snake (Rick's Bungalow mix 7" edit)" – 4:07
2. "King of Snake (Rick's Bungalow mix)" – 8:53

CD : Junior Boy's Own; JBO5008623P (UK) promo

1. "King of Snake (Straight (Mate) mix)" – 3:51
2. "King of Snake (Barking mix)" – 3:53

12" : Junior Boy's Own; JBO5008796 (UK) Part 1/2

1. "King of Snake (original version)" – 8:49
2. "King of Snake (Ashley Beedle's Save Our Discos re-edit)" – 6:03
3. "King of Snake (Fatboy Slim remix)" – 6:56

12" : Junior Boy's Own; JBO5009806 (UK) Part 2/2

1. "King of Snake (Rick's Bungalow remix)" – 8:49
2. "King of Snake (Dave Clarke remix) " – 6:03

12" : Junior Boy's Own; JBO5010856 (IT)

1. "King of Snake (Dino Lenny remix)" – 7:58
2. "King of Snake (Fatboy Slim remix)" – 6:54
3. "King of Snake (Coccoluto mix)" – 8:34
4. "King of Snake (Martinez Orchestramix)" – 8:04

12": Junior Boy's Own; JBO5005816P (UK) promo

1. "King of Snake (original version)" – 8:56
2. "King of Snake (Dave Angel rework)" – 6:54

12": Junior Boy's Own; JBO5005826P (UK) promo

1. "King of Snake (Dave Clarke remix)" – 6:01
2. "Kittens" – 7:30

2x12": Junior Boy's Own; JBO5008606P (UK) promo

1. "King of Snake (original version)" – 8:35
2. "King of Snake (Ashley Beedle's Save Our Discos re-edit)" – 8:23
3. "King of Snake (Fatboy Slim remix)" – 6:56
4. "King of Snake (Slam remix)" – 7:17

== Critical reception ==
Paul Cooper of Pitchfork gave the single a positive review, writing "I have to wonder if 'King of Snake' is such a smoking choon that nobody--not even that geezer from Adamski--could screw it up. At the moment, unfortunately, these are important singles and consequently about nine dollars apiece. But I assure you, while you might find pretenders of the throne, there is only the one King of Snake."

== Charts ==
Chart (1999)	Peak position
Australia (ARIA)	82
Belgium Dance (Ultratop Flanders)	28
Scottish Singles Sales (Official Charts)	22
UK Singles (Official Charts)	17
UK Dance (Official Charts)	2
UK Indie (Official Charts)	1

== Appearances ==
- "Shudder / King of Snake" appears on Beaucoup Fish.
- "King of Snake (Fatboy Slim Remix)" appears in the 2000 film Kevin & Perry Go Large.
- "Shudder / King of Snake" appears in the 2010 film Biutiful.

== Notes ==
- There were several exclusive releases for this; Ricks Mixes on CD were promo only.
- There were three exclusive mixes for Italy released on 12", and CD.
