= A Hundred Days Off =

2002 album by Underworld

Studio album by Underworld
- Released: 4 September 2002
- Studios: Lemonworld (London, England)
- Genres: Electronic; techno; house; lounge; downtempo; ambient
- Length: 61:50
- Label: V2
- Producers: Karl Hyde and Rick Smith

Underworld chronology
Everything, Everything (2000)	A Hundred Days Off (2002)	1992–2002 (2003)

Singles from A Hundred Days Off
- 1. "Two Months Off" Released: 28 August 2002; 2. "Dinosaur Adventure 3D" Released: 11 December 2002

Professional ratings
Aggregate scores
Source	Rating
Metacritic	71/100
Review scores
Source	Rating
AllMusic	2/5 stars
Alternative Press	3.5/5 stars
The Guardian	3/5 stars
NME	8/10
Pitchfork	6.9/10
Release Magazine	7/10
Resident Advisor	5/5 stars
Rolling Stone	3/5 stars
Stylus Magazine	B+
Uncut	4/5 stars

A Hundred Days Off is the sixth album by British electronic music group Underworld. The album produced two UK Singles Chart entries: "Two Months Off", which reached No. 12, and "Dinosaur Adventure 3D", which reached No. 34. Although this was the first album since Darren Emerson's departure from the group in 2001, the album is not a huge stylistic makeover as the main focus of the band is still trance, techno, and house, although without the thumping beats that defined their previous album Beaucoup Fish. Instead, the album explores more of an ambient and experimental music style.

== Critical reception ==
A Hundred Days Off received generally positive reviews from music critics. It has a score of 71/100 on Metacritic based on 18 reviews indicating as "generally favorable reviews". NME gave the album 8/10 describing it as "Their best album since their Dubnobasswithmyheadman debut, Karl and Rick have pulled off a comeback in fine style and laid some demons to rest" and also stating that "Underworld prove that you're only as old as the technology you use". Rolling Stone gave the album 3 out of 5 stars saying that "The beauty of A Hundred Days Off is that it pumps and churns so suggestively; it somehow evokes the blues of the otherwise successful modern man, who goes out every night and dances alone in his head". Uncut gave the album 4 out of 5 stars saying it is "A very fine album--Underworld don't make any other kind...a beautiful and baffling enigma."

== Promo version ==
In the Spring of 2011, an alternate version of the album was distributed by a fan who was previously unaware that it was not widely heard. This version of the album was called "Ansum", and was apparently an early un-mastered cut of the album burned onto a CD-R for internal use at V2. Most of the tracks are very similar, if not identical, to the final album version; however, the track order is changed; "Little Speaker" is omitted; "Mo Move" is doubled in length and shares its second half with a re-worked version of the b-side "Ansum"; "Twist" contains an extended drum outro; and "Ballet Lane" and "Trim" contain minor percussion differences.

== Track listing ==
All music is composed by Underworld.

No.	Title	Length
1.	"Mo Move"	6:54
2.	"Two Months Off"	9:08
3.	"Twist"	6:24
4.	"Sola Sistim"	6:26
5.	"Little Speaker"	8:38
6.	"Trim"	3:23
7.	"Ess Gee"	2:22
8.	"Dinosaur Adventure 3D"	7:56
9.	"Ballet Lane"	3:39
10.	"Luetin"	7:00
Total length:		61:50

== Promo version track listing ==
No.	Title	Length
1.	"Two Months Off"	9:08
2.	"Twist"	8:46
3.	"Sola Systim"	6:12
4.	"Ess Gee"	2:17
5.	"Mo Move"	13:48
6.	"Trim"	3:18
7.	"Dinosaur Adventure 3D"	7:55
8.	"Ballet Lane"	3:26
9.	"Luetin"	7:06
Total length:		61:56

== Charts ==
Chart performance for A Hundred Days Off
Chart (2002)	Peak position
Australian Albums Chart	24
Belgian Albums Chart	6
Dutch Albums Chart	9
French Albums Chart	42
German Albums Chart	34
Japanese Albums Chart	7
Swedish Albums Chart	49
UK Albums Chart	16
US Billboard 200	122
US Billboard Electronic Albums	2

== Certifications ==
Certifications for A Hundred Days Off
Region	Certification	Certified units/sales
Japan (RIAJ)	Gold	100,000^{^}
United Kingdom (BPI)	Silver	60,000^{‡}
^{^} Shipments figures based on certification alone.
