= Yen (band) =

German rock band

- Origin: Germany
- Genres: Rock
- Years active: 2004–present
- Label: MX
- Members: Yen-Hwei Anetzberger; Christian Fütterer; Steffen Fütterer; Benjamin Heckmann
- Website: www.yen-music.com

Yen is a German rock band. The name of the band stems from singer-songwriter Yen-Hwei Anetzberger. "Yen-Hwei" means "Abundant grace" in Mandarin.

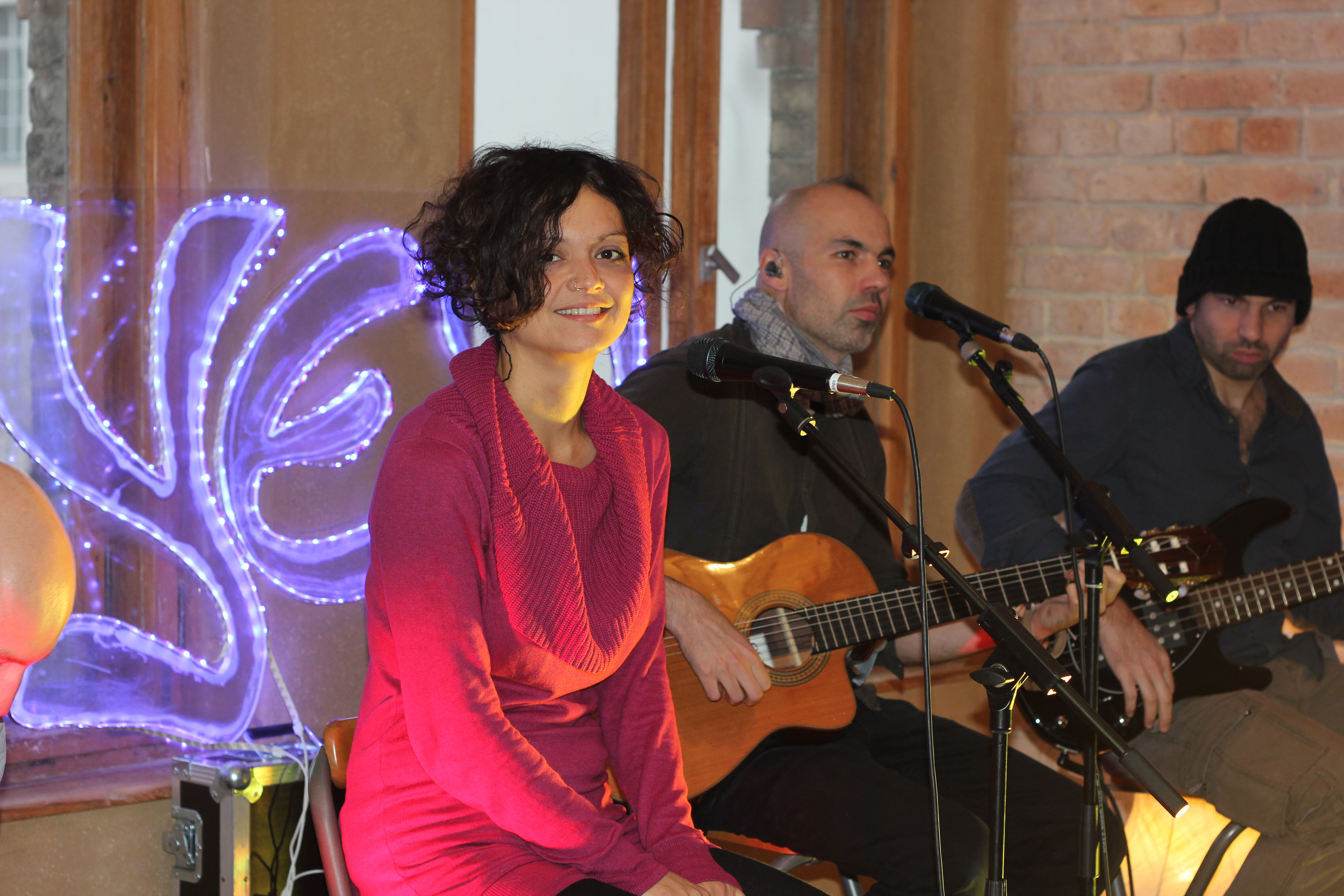
Yen in Berlin 2013

== History ==
Yen was formed by a chance meeting between singer Yen-Hwei Anetzberger and guitarist Christian Fütterer at the end of 2003. Yen had already written some lyrics and Christian was in a band called Skrunge with his brother Steffen and bassist/drummer Benjamin Heckmann. Their initial samples were successful and in early 2004, the group decided to continue working together under the name of Yen.

In 2006, Yen was nominated for the German Rock and Pop prize. In 2007, singer Yen reached the top 20 in the finals of Stefan Raab's music show SSDSDSSWEMUGABRTLAD. Yen has produced three albums and three singles in total and is signed to the Frankfurt indie label MX Records. Yen became recognized in Germany as a female pop singer in 2007.

Yen also collaborated on the debut album of the band Eschenbach, which was produced by Stephan Weidner and released in November 2009, with the song "Frag Dich Selbst" (English: Ask Yourself). As a result of the positive response to the track, Yen contributed to the CD "Autonomie" Stephan Weidner and provided background vocals for the songs "Sterne" (stars), "Niemand Hier" (Nobody here) and "Hafen" (harbour).

== Music ==
The English lyrics in Yen's current albums are mostly autobiographical, and form a common thread running through the songs. A central theme is desire. The rock and alternative genre also inspired Yen to venture into exploring popular realms. This led to the recent single "Deep Space Night" in collaboration with the Mannheim music producer and songwriter Philippe van Eecke, who has also composed for such artists as Simple Plan and Yvonne.

In August 2009, their first unplugged recording was released under the name "Sofa – so good" and can be considered as a homage to their summer tour. Yen toured in Germany with a specially designed sofa on wheels, playing in pedestrian areas and city beaches. Their albums so far have been released on the German label MX Records.

Yen's latest album, "Into the Sun" was released in January 2013. Their fourth album, currently being recorded in 2014 marks a return to their German roots, with "Wo willst du hin?" (Roughly translated as Where are you going?) and "Krieger" (Warrior) exploring the direction post-industrial society is taking as the democratic process breaks down. Their fourth album, "Das Experiment" is planned for release in December, although which December has not yet been decided.

== Discography ==
=== Albums ===
- Deep Inside (25 January 2008)
- Sofa – so good (28 August 2009)
- Into the Sun (25 January 2013)

=== Singles ===
- "Separate Entity" (23 November 2007)
- "Deep Space Night" (31 October 2008)
