= Pearl's Girl =

1996 single by Underworld

Single by Underworld

from the album Second Toughest in the Infants
- B-side: "Oich Oich"; "Cherry Pie"; "Mosaic"; "Deep Arch"
- Released: 6 May 1996
- Length: 10:07
- Label: Junior Boy's Own
- Songwriters: Rick Smith, Karl Hyde, Darren Emerson
- Producers: Rick Smith, Karl Hyde, Darren Emerson

Underworld singles chronology
"Rowla" (1996)	"Pearl's Girl" (1996)	"Born Slippy .NUXX" (1996)

"Pearl's Girl" is the title of several 1996 single releases and a song by Underworld, from their album Second Toughest in the Infants, on which the song is titled "Pearls Girl". The single peaked on the UK Singles Chart at number 22. The song title comes from the name of a racing greyhound.

"I spent a few nights in Hamburg," recalled Karl Hyde, "and it actually came from a night on the Rioja down by the docks. I'm actually shouting, Rioja, Rioja… I'd come from this really great club on the Reeperbahn, listening to lots of classic soul, which is where the 'Reverend Al Green' bit comes from. I was sitting by the docks and they have these 'bride boats' there, which people get married on. They go down the river and out to sea. I was just sitting there, Rioja-ed out, watching these boats sail past me at three in the morning. There were bonfires and everything."

== Track listings ==
UK CD1

1. "Pearl's Girl" (short) – 4:25
2. "Oich Oich" – 8:33
3. "Cherry Pie" – 8:22

UK CD2

1. "Pearl's Girl (Carp Dreams...Koi)" – 10:07
2. "Mosaic" – 5:01
3. "Deep Arch" – 8:24

UK 12-inch

1. "Pearl's Girl (Carp Dreams...Koi)" – 10:07
2. "Cherry Pie" – 8:22

UK triple 12-inch and double CD

1. "Pearl's Girl" (short) – 3:50
2. "Oich Oich" – 8:33
3. "Cherry Pie" – 8:22
4. "Pearl's Girl (Carp Dreams...Koi)" – 10:07
5. "Mosaic" – 5:01
6. "Deep Arch" – 8:24

== Charts ==
Chart (1996)	Peak position
Scottish Singles Sales (Official Charts)	44
UK Singles (Official Charts)	24
UK Dance (Official Charts)	27

== Re-release ==
"Pearl's Girl" (re-issue)

Single by Underworld
- B-side: "Oich Oich"; "Cherry Pie"; "Puppies"; "Born Slippy"
- Released: 28 October 1996
- Label: Junior Boy's Own
- Songwriters: Rick Smith, Karl Hyde, Darren Emerson
- Producers: Rick Smith, Karl Hyde, Darren Emerson

=== Track listings ===
UK CD1

1. "Pearl's Girl" (short version) – 4:24
2. "Oich Oich" – 8:33
3. "Cherry Pie" – 8:21

UK CD2

1. "Pearl's Girl (Tin There)" – 8:11
2. "Puppies" – 3:53
3. "Born Slippy" – 8:57

US CD

1. "Pearl's Girl (Tin There) – 8:07
2. "Pearl's Girl" (14996 version) – 8:50
3. "Puppies" – 3:51
4. "Oich Oich" – 8:30
5. "Cherry Pie" – 8:18
6. "Pearl's Girl" (edit) – 4:22
7. "Pearl's Girl" (album version) – 9:35
8. "Mosaic" – 4:58
9. "Deep Arch" – 8:22

=== Charts ===
Chart (1996)	Peak position
Europe (Eurochart Hot 100)	94
Scottish Singles Sales (Official Charts)	21
UK Singles (Official Charts)	22
UK Dance (Official Charts)	9

== Appearances ==
- The 9:37 version appears on the first CD soundtrack to the 1997 film The Saint; The Saint: Music from the Motion Picture, Virgin Records, 1997.
- "Pearl's Girl" was the third track on the 1997 compilation album MTV's Amp.
- "Tin There" appears on the Wipeout 2097 soundtrack as an original mix with reduced percussion and an ambient ending.
- "Pearl's Girl" was featured on Q magazine's (UK) Essential Dance CD in 2001.
- "Pearl's Girl" appears on the 2013 video game, Gran Turismo 6.
- "Pearl's Girl" can be heard as the intro to ZZ Top's Live From Texas.

== Usage in media ==
- "Pearl's Girl" appears in the opening credits for the 1998 film Holy Man.
- "Pearl's Girl" is one of the tracks heard on the bad guys' car stereo when they are in pursuit of Simon Templar (Val Kilmer) and Dr Emma Russell (Elisabeth Shue) in The Saint. Director Phillip Noyce mixed Graeme Revell's original score with source music heard on radios throughout various points in the film.
- "Pearl's Girl" was used as the theme music for the Channel 4 drama series Psychos. It was set in a mental ward and featured Nicholas Clay among the cast.
- In 1998 "Pearl's Girl" was used as the backing track to Radio 1's Newsbeat, giving a cutting-edge feel to the fast-moving news programme. The words were edited out. The drum sounds were played in a continuous loop until the end of each bulletin.
- In February 2010, "Pearl's Girl" was used in a Channel 4 advert for drama series The Good Wife.
- The song appears in the 2013 video game Gran Turismo 6.
