= Moaner (song) =

Single by Underworld

from the album Batman & Robin soundtrack and Beaucoup Fish
- Released: 21 July 1997
- Genre: Electronic rock; techno
- Length: 4:08 (short version); 10:18 (album version)
- Label: Junior Boy's Own / Wax Trax! / TVT / Warner Bros.
- Songwriter(s): Rick Smith, Karl Hyde, Darren Emerson
- Producer(s): Rick Smith, Karl Hyde, Darren Emerson

Underworld singles chronology
"Juanita" (1997)	"Moaner" (1997)	"Push Upstairs" (1999)

"Moaner" is a song by Underworld, first appearing in 1997 on the Batman & Robin soundtrack. It was also commercially released as a single in Germany and Japan, with promo-only releases being made available in the UK and US. Sales of the imported German release were sufficient for a UK Singles Chart entry, peaking at #89. The 7:37 "long version" which omits the beatless ambient techno outro appears as the last track on the group's 1999 album Beaucoup Fish, while the longer 10:17 "album version" appears on other compilation albums.

The song's bassline was ranked by Stylus Magazine at number 27 in their list of the "Top 50 Basslines of All Time". However, the same article mentions lyrics which are in fact the lyrics to the track "Push Upstairs". It might be this track that they are actually referring to.

== Track listings ==
=== Four track commercial releases ===
12": Warner / 9362 43917-0 (Germany)
CD: Warner / 9362 43905-2 (Germany)
CD: WEA / WPCR-1472 (Japan)

1. "Moaner" (short version) – 4:08 (Hyde/Smith/Emerson)
2. "Moaner" (album version) – 10:18 (Hyde/Smith/Emerson)
3. "Moaner" (Relentless Legs Remix) – 10:04 (Remixed by Hyde/Smith/Emerson)
4. "Moaner" (long version) – 7:37 (Hyde/Smith/Emerson)

=== Three track promotional releases ===
12": Warner / PRO-A-8976 (USA)
CD: Warner / PRO-CD-8976 (USA)
CD: Warner / PRCD 754 (Germany)

1. "Moaner" (long version) – 7:37
2. "Moaner" (short version) – 4:08
3. "Moaner" (Relentless Legs Remix) – 10:04

== Appearances ==
- The "long version" appears on the album Beaucoup Fish, less a short cut-up intro only available on the single.
- The "album version" appears on the Batman & Robin soundtrack, and on the compilations 1992–2002 and 1992–2012 The Anthology. On the former, the song omits the fade-out and ends abruptly instead.

== Charts ==
Chart (1997)	Peak position
Belgium (Ultratip Bubbling Under Flanders)	2
Germany (GfK)	69
UK Singles (OCC)	79
