= Born Slippy (Nuxx) =

1996 single by Underworld

"Born Slippy .NUXX"

Single by Underworld

from the album Trainspotting: Music from the Motion Picture
- A-side: "Born Slippy"
- B-side: "Deep Pan" version; Darren Price remix; "Banstyle" (Alex Reece remix)
- Released: 1 July 1996
- Genre: Techno; experimental
- Length: 11:46 (original); 9:44 (original segued edit); 4:25 (short edit); 3:45 (short edit 2)
- Label: Junior Boy's Own
- Songwriters: Rick Smith; Karl Hyde; Darren Emerson
- Producers: Rick Smith; Karl Hyde; Darren Emerson

Underworld singles chronology
"Pearl's Girl" (1996)	"Born Slippy .NUXX" (1996)	"Juanita" (1997)

Music video
- "Born Slippy .NUXX" on YouTube

Underworld singles chronology
"Dirty Epic" (1994)	"Born Slippy" (1995)	"Rowla" (1996)

"Born Slippy .NUXX" is a song by the British electronic music group Underworld. It was first released as the B-side to another track, "Born Slippy", in May 1995. The fragmented lyrics describe the perspective of an alcoholic.

After it was used in the 1996 film Trainspotting, "Born Slippy .NUXX" reached number two on the UK singles chart. It was named one of the best dance tracks and one of the best tracks of the 1990s by numerous publications. For the 2017 film T2 Trainspotting, Underworld created a new version with timestretched chords.

== Composition ==
"Born Slippy .NUXX" features a "hammering" four-on-the-floor kick drum, distorted vocals, and "heavenly" synthesiser chords. The vocalist, Karl Hyde, wrote the lyrics after a night of drinking in Wardour Street in Soho, London. Hyde was influenced by Lou Reed's 1989 album New York, in which "Reed sounds like he's been sitting in a bar, writing down the conversations he heard", and Sam Shepard's 1983 memoir Motel Chronicles, which comprises vignettes that describe moments and feelings "with no beginning or end". Hyde began taking a notebook and a camera to document his environments. He wrote about his alcoholism and hoped to capture the way a drunk "sees the world in fragments", in that only small portions of memory are retained afterwards, like a bin or "a little piece of street". In the lyrics, he reduced himself to "a piece of meat".

Hyde recorded his vocals in one take. When he lost his place, he would sing the same line repeatedly, creating the line "lager, lager, lager, lager". The producer, Rick Smith, said the lyrics reflected "this energy of movement, and of time and place," likening them to an abstract painting.

The lyrics have been misinterpreted as a hedonistic celebration of drinking. Hyde did not intend the song to be a "drinking anthem" but rather a "cry for help", and was disturbed when audience members raised their lager cans during performances. As Hyde wrote the song while drunk, he felt its status as a "drinking anthem" was ironic.

== Release ==
Underworld released "Born Slippy .NUXX" in the UK on 1 May 1995 as the B-side to a different track, "Born Slippy". "Born Slippy .NUXX" was used in the film Trainspotting, released in February 1996 in the UK. The director, Danny Boyle, described it as the "heartbeat" of the film, capturing its "euphoric highs following intense lows". Underworld initially refused permission to use it in the film, as they disliked how their music was often used in negative portrayals of clubbing, but Boyle persuaded them after showing them a clip.

"Born Slippy .NUXX" was reissued as a single in the UK on 1 July 1996. Boosted by the Trainspotting soundtrack, it reached number two on the UK singles chart. Smith was shocked when BBC Radio 1 played the track on breakfast radio, and said: "I thought, music is moving, culture is moving, it's spreading. It's meaning things outside of just the context of on an amazing sound system in a club or on a PA system in a student hall. It was very nice!" The reissue was released in the US in October 1996. For the 2017 film T2 Trainspotting, Smith created a new version with timestretched chords, "Slow Slippy".

== Reception ==
Melody Maker named "Born Slippy .NUXX" the single of the year in December 1996, writing: "As a stomping club anthem, it whipped up a Shamanic, hedonistic frenzy — yet the lyrics, culminating in the "Lager, lager, lager, mega-mega-white thing" chant nailed everything about the Loaded, lads, birds 'n'booze culture of the mid-Nineties." Music Week gave it five out of five in 1996, calling it "an anthem for a generation". The singer Boy George reviewed the "Nuxx Mix" for Select, calling it "brilliant" and writing: "Nice lyrics in a ranting, punky style. I like techno records that swoop." AllMusic wrote that it was "simply one of the best slices of electronica one will find. Musically austere in its emotional textures, the song becomes a nearly unstoppable force ... Dance music is rarely so artistic and enjoyable in the same instance." In 2017, Vice described "Born Slippy .NUXX" as one of the most iconic 1990s songs, writing that it "mixed sublime synths with a four-to-the-floor freakout, and represented everything that was going on; it was new".

In 2004, Mixmag readers voted "Born Slippy .NUXX" the fourth-best dance track, and in 2011 Slant Magazine named it the 95th-best single of the decade. In 2014, NME named it the 261st-greatest song. In 2010, Pitchfork named it the 31st-best track of the 1990s, and in 2022 they named it the 20th-best. In 2015, LA Weekly ranked it the sixth-best dance track in history. The Guardian called it the "most experimental and sonically extreme hit of the 90s", alongside the Chemical Brothers' 1996 single "Setting Sun", and among "the weirdest chart hits of all time". In 2024, the Guardian's chief music critic, Alexis Petridis, named "Born Slippy .NUXX" the third-best Underworld song. In 2022, Rolling Stone ranked it the 89th-greatest dance song, and in 2025 Billboard named it the eighth-best. Smith said in 2017: "We've been playing 'Born Slippy' live for 20 years, and the reaction from the audience is so strong it's almost overwhelming. It's never got tiring to perform or play. It's what it triggers in people."

== Track listing ==
Durations vary across releases.

1995 UK 12" single

1. "Born Slippy" – 8:57
2. "Born Slippy .NUXX" – 11:37

1995 CD single

1. "Born Slippy" – 8:30
2. "Born Slippy .NUXX" – 9:44
3. "Born Slippy .TELEMATIC" – 9:39

1996 US CD single

1. "Born Slippy .NUXX" – 11:37
2. "Born Slippy .NUXX" (Deep Pan) – 9:59
3. "Born Slippy .NUXX" (Darren Price Mix) – 6:31
4. "Born Slippy .NUXX" (Darren Price Remix) – 8:11
5. "Born Slippy .NUXX" (Short) – 4:23
6. "Dark & Long" (Dark Train) – 10:24
7. "Banstyle" (Alex Reece Mix) – 5:38

== Charts ==
=== Weekly charts ===
Chart (1996–1997)	Peak position
Australia (ARIA)	20
Austria (Ö3 Austria Top 40)	20
Belgium (Ultratop 50 Flanders)	4
Belgium (Ultratop 50 Wallonia)	18
Canada Dance/Urban (RPM)	22
Europe (Eurochart Hot 100)	7
Europe (European Dance Radio)	25
Finland (Suomen virallinen lista)	17
Germany (GfK)	13
Iceland (Íslenski Listinn Topp 40)	3
Ireland (IRMA)	5
Israel (Israeli Singles Chart)	10
Italy (Musica e dischi)	1
Netherlands (Dutch Top 40)	28
Netherlands (Single Top 100)	30
Scottish Singles Sales (Official Charts)	2
Sweden (Sverigetopplistan)	51
UK Singles (Official Charts)	2
UK Dance (Official Charts)	2
UK Indie (Music Week)	1
US Dance Club Songs (Billboard)	33

Chart (2012)	Peak position
Japan Hot 100 (Billboard)	98

=== Year-end charts ===
Chart (1996)	Position
Belgium (Ultratop 50 Flanders)	51
Belgium (Ultratop 50 Wallonia)	73
Europe (Eurochart Hot 100)	53
Germany (Media Control)	81
Iceland (Íslenski Listinn Topp 40)	36
UK Singles (OCC)	23

== Certifications ==
Region	Certification	Certified units/sales
New Zealand (RMNZ)	Platinum	30,000^{‡}
United Kingdom (BPI) Born Slippy Nuxx	2× Platinum	1,200,000^{‡}
United Kingdom (BPI)	Gold	400,000^{^}
^{^} Shipments figures based on certification alone.^{‡} Sales+streaming figures based on certification alone.

== "Born Slippy .NUXX 2003" ==
"Born Slippy .NUXX 2003"

Single by Underworld
- Released: 27 October 2003
- Genre: Dance
- Length: 3:58
- Label: Junior Boy's Own; V2
- Songwriters: Rick Smith; Karl Hyde
- Producer: Underworld

Underworld singles chronology
"Dinosaur Adventure 3D" (2002)	"Born Slippy .NUXX 2003" (2003)	"JAL to Tokyo" (2005)

"Born Slippy .NUXX 2003" is a version of "Born Slippy .NUXX" re-released by Underworld to promote the album 1992–2002, originally released in 2003. New remixes were commissioned for this release, along with a new video, compiled by Danny Boyle of clips from his film Trainspotting. This release reached No. 1 on the UK Dance Singles Chart during the first week of November 2003.

=== Track listings ===
UK and European CD single
No.	Title	Length
1.	"Born Slippy .NUXX (2003 Edit)"	3:58
2.	"Born Slippy .NUXX (Atomic Hooligan Remix)"	7:19
3.	"Born Slippy .NUXX (Paul Oakenfold Mix)"	8:11

European 12-inch single
No.	Title	Length
1.	"Born Slippy .NUXX (2003 12-inch version)"	7:01
2.	"Born Slippy .NUXX (Paul Oakenfold Mix)"	8:11

US 12-inch single
No.	Title	Length
1.	"Born Slippy .NUXX (Paul Oakenfold Mix)"	8:11
2.	"Born Slippy .NUXX (2003 12-inch version)"	7:01

=== Charts ===
Chart (2003–2004)	Peak position
Belgium (Ultratip Bubbling Under Flanders)	13
Italy (FIMI)	44
Scottish Singles Sales (Official Charts)	24
UK Singles (Official Charts)	27
UK Dance (Official Charts)	1
UK Indie (Official Charts)	4
US Dance Club Songs (Billboard)	9
