= Beaucoup Fish =

Studio album by Underworld
- Released: 1 March 1999
- Recorded: 1997–1998
- Studios: Lemonworld Studios, London
- Genres: Techno; progressive house; progressive trance; ambient; downtempo
- Length: 74:17
- Labels: Junior Boy's Own; V2
- Producer: Rick Smith

Underworld chronology
Second Toughest in the Infants (1996)	Beaucoup Fish (1999)	Everything, Everything (2000)

Singles from Beaucoup Fish
- 1. "Moaner" Released: 21 July 1997; 2. "Push Upstairs" Released: 15 March 1999; 3. "Jumbo" Released: 24 May 1999; 4. "King of Snake" Released: 16 August 1999; 5. "Bruce Lee" Released: 15 November 1999

Alternative cover
- Vinyl edition

Beaucoup Fish is the fifth album by Underworld, released in 1999. Following the huge success of the single "Born Slippy .NUXX" from its use in the film Trainspotting, Beaucoup Fish was Underworld's most anticipated release. It spawned several successful singles, including "Push Upstairs", "Jumbo" and "Moaner", which was previously used in the film Batman & Robin.

It is the last studio album to feature Darren Emerson, and the third album by the techno/house orientated version of Underworld.

The album was remastered and re-released in 2017 with deluxe and super-deluxe expanded editions.

== Overview ==
Beaucoup Fish was released after the successful single "Born Slippy .NUXX"; a single that began to define Underworld's signature sound of stream of consciousness lyrics, anthemic melodies and driving beats and rhythms. Lead single "Push Upstairs", with its energetic piano melody, exemplified this new sound.

The album's working title was Tonight Matthew, I'm Going to be Underworld, inspired by the famous catchphrase "Tonight [host name], I'm going to be...", used on the British celebrity impersonation TV programme Stars in Their Eyes. The title was changed to Beaucoup Fish ("beaucoup" being French for "much"), on the basis that the tongue-in-cheek title would be incomprehensible to listeners outside of the United Kingdom. The current title comes from a sampled voice used in "Jumbo", featuring an American from the Deep South, probably Louisiana, using the regional pronunciation "bookoo fish," influenced by Cajun and Creole speech.

"King of Snake" features a tape-edited guitar intro titled "Shudder", leading into a lively house track, before fading into sampled dialogue about the blood sport of snake baiting. "Skym" is a minimal ballad, inspired by This Mortal Coil and featuring little more than a solo keyboard and light piano chords over Karl Hyde's vocals, while "Bruce Lee" has more akin to rock music than trance. Beaucoup Fish also features a downtempo re-imagining of "Push Upstairs", playfully titled "Push Downstairs"; only the vocal track is kept between the two. "Moaner", a song featured in the 1997 film Batman & Robin, is presented on Beaucoup Fish in its slightly edited soundtrack album version, previously available on an Underworld CD single.

"Push Upstairs" and second single "Jumbo" were both hits on the dance charts and in clubs. Beaucoup Fish was well-received critically (one review calling it "electronica's The Dark Side of the Moon") and remains Underworld's most successful album, with over two million copies sold.

== Artwork ==
The art for Beaucoup Fish was once again designed by Tomato, the art firm that Underworld is a part of. Each page of the liner notes featured a stylised shape in a large blue field. The shapes used are a circle for CD; a square for vinyl; and an elongated rectangle for MiniDisc and cassette formats.

Due to delays, the packaging incorrectly lists 1998 as the release year.

== Critical reception ==
Professional ratings
Aggregate scores
Source	Rating
Metacritic	79/100
Review scores
Source	Rating
AllMusic	4/5 stars
Entertainment Weekly	A
The Guardian	4/5 stars
Melody Maker	5/5 stars
Mixmag	5/5
NME	8/10
Pitchfork	6.8/10
Q	3/5 stars
Rolling Stone	3.5/5 stars
Spin	7/10

Beaucoup Fish was well received by music critics and it continues to be Underworld's best selling album to date. It has a score of 79/100 on Metacritic based on 20 reviews, which indicates "generally favorable reviews".

John Bush from AllMusic gave the album 4 out of 5 stars saying "the trio is still the best at welding obtuse songcraft onto an uncompromising techno framework and making both sound great".

David Browne from Entertainment Weekly gave the album an A rating stating that Beaucoup Fish "gently tweaks the naysayers by demonstrating how many more places this music can wander, how it can grow and reinvent itself. Albums like this (and Fatboy Slim's kaleidoscopic You've Come a Long Way, Baby) are comparable to Lauryn Hill's recent work in the way they make an overly familiar style of music seem vital again. In its own lush, detached manner, Beaucoup Fish is the rebirth of the cool."

John Wojtowicz from The Village Voice gave it a very favourable review saying it is "A shiny little appliance that fragments its 11 tracks into nearly as many subgenres, doing away with the seamless sprawl of their earlier records".

Rolling Stone gave it 3.5 stars out of 5 saying that "Their specialty is an undulating trance throb that shimmers with shades of rock, contemporary symphonics, dub, disco, house, spoken word, whatever. The result still sounds like Underworld, and the fiftieth play sounds better than the fifth".

NME gave the album 8/10 saying that "Beaucoup Fish is a pure, seamless flow, pinned together with trance-techno beats that hark back to classic Detroit house and early Underworld singles like 'Cowgirl' and 'Spikee'" and also adding that "There are rare moments when even the longest albums feel like they should go on forever: this, emphatically, is one of them".

- Spin (4/99, pp. 157–158) - 7 (out of 10) - "...the British trio hit on a formula that mixes agression [sic] and gibberish in just the right proportions..."
- Q (4/99, p. 107) - 3 Stars (out of 5) - "...Beaucoup Fish finds them continuing down an individualistic path as they pull in strands from electronic influences such as Kraftwerk...Giorgio Moroder...and Yello..."
- Magnet (4/99, pp. 81–82) - "...Rather than adopt the happy faces of house, the saintly roar of modern minimalist/classical, the bugged-out rhythms of drum 'n' bass or the sloped dope of dub, the first great album of '99 revels in all these styles....[Underworld] seems to be funkin' for nirvana..."
- Muzik (1/00, p. 69) - "A brutal, bruising take on the band's unique techno template....the melodies were infectious as ever. Trance tunes, swirling basslines and stupendous piano chuggers..."
- CMJ (4/12/99, p. 3) - "...showcases a more mature, album-oriented Underworld, travelling from over-the-top club maelstroms to ominous, gothic ballads to choppy, experimental rap..."
- Mojo (03/99, p. 84) - "...BEAUCOUP FISH proves that the real deal with electronic music is not that it is fast and crazy....but allows for perfect recall of sounds and moments....music like Underworld's can have a texture as rich, emotive and individual as memory itself."

=== Accolades ===
- Muzik (1/00, p. 69) - Ranked No. 10 in Muzik's "Albums of the Year '99"
- CMJ (1/10/00, p. 5) - Ranked No. 14 in CMJ's "Top 30 Editorial Picks [for 1999]."
- Mojo (1/00, p. 30) - Ranked No. 18 in Mojo Magazine's "Best of 1999"

=== 2017 reissue ===
Professional ratings
Review scores
Source	Rating
The Line of Best Fit	7.5/10
Louder Than War	8.5/10
Pitchfork	7.4/10
PopMatters	9/10

In 2017 the album was reissued, with expanded 2-LP vinyl and 4-CD editions. Pitchfork's Philip Sherburne dismissed the two remix CDs as "mainly of interest to collectors" and the alternate takes as "not much more essential" in an otherwise positive review. Chris Todd of The Line of Best Fit similarly pans the extra discs, but calls the original album "weirdly brilliant."

== Track listing ==
All tracks are written by Darren Emerson, Karl Hyde, and Rick Smith except "Shudder/King of Snake", written by Underworld, Donna Summer, Giorgio Moroder and Pete Bellotte.

No.	Title	Length
1.	"Cups"	11:45
2.	"Push Upstairs"	4:34
3.	"Jumbo"	6:58
4.	"Shudder/King of Snake"	9:29
5.	"Winjer"	4:29
6.	"Skym"	4:07
7.	"Bruce Lee"	4:42
8.	"Kittens"	7:30
9.	"Push Downstairs"	6:03
10.	"Something Like a Mama"	6:37
11.	"Moaner"	7:32
Total length:		74:17

=== 4-CD Super Deluxe Edition (2017) ===
CD2: Unreleased and Rarities
No.	Title	Length
1.	"Nifter" (5 A1317 Nov 97)	4:38
2.	"Bruce Lee" (Ricks 1st Dobro Mix)	5:10
3.	"UW Orange Bed" (Sept97)	7:02
4.	"Skym" (A A1317 Nov 97)	4:55
5.	"Jumbo" (Diff Bass 2 A1317 Nov 97)	7:50
6.	"Push Upstairs" (Alt 1 A1336 July 98)	3:54
7.	"King of Snake" (Garage Mix A1313 Set 97b)	8:56
8.	"Something Like a Mama" (Alt Mix A1340 July 98 A Upstairs)	10:10
9.	"Please Help Me"	7:35
10.	"Yeah Plan" (From A1385)	4:11
11.	"Ramajama"	8:58

CD3: Remixes - Part 1
No.	Title	Length
1.	"Cups" (Salt City Orchestra's Vertical Bacon Vocal)	9:26
2.	"Jumbo" (Jedi's Sugar Hit Mix)	6:29
3.	"Jumbo" (Futureshock Worlds Apart Vox)	8:08
4.	"Push Upstairs" (Darren Price Remix)	7:03
5.	"King of Snake" (Slam Remix)	7:29
6.	"King of Snake" (Fatboy Slim Remix)	6:55
7.	"King of Snake" (Dave Clarke Remix)	5:59
8.	"Bruce Lee" (Micronauts Remix)	8:57
9.	"Bruce Lee" (Buffalo Daughter Remix)	4:22

CD4: Remixes - Part 2
No.	Title	Length
1.	"Bruce Lee" (DJ Hype & DJ Zinc Vocal Mix)	6:42
2.	"Bruce Lee" (DJ Hype & DJ Zinc Instrumental Mix)	6:34
3.	"Bruce Lee" (Futureshock Remix)	8:11
4.	"King of Snake" (Claudio Coccoluto Remix)	8:24
5.	"King of Snake" (Martinez Orchestramix)	7:52
6.	"King of Snake" (Dave Angel Remix)	6:54
7.	"Jumbo" (Rob Rives & Francois Kevorkian Dub)	8:20
8.	"Push Upstairs" (Roger S. Narcotic Haze Dub)	6:44
9.	"Push Upstairs" (Adam Beyer Rmx 2)	4:45

== Charts ==
=== Weekly charts ===
Chart (1999)	Peak position
Australian Albums (ARIA)	7
Austrian Albums (Ö3 Austria)	36
Belgian Albums (Ultratop Flanders)	2
Belgian Albums (Ultratop Wallonia)	40
Canada Top Albums/CDs (RPM)	18
Danish Albums (Hitlisten)	38
Dutch Albums (Album Top 100)	32
French Albums (SNEP)	34
German Albums (Offizielle Top 100)	22
New Zealand Albums (RMNZ)	7
Norwegian Albums (VG-lista)	14
Scottish Albums (Official Charts)	7
Swedish Albums (Sverigetopplistan)	22
Swiss Albums (Schweizer Hitparade)	46
UK Albums (Official Charts)	3
UK Independent Albums (Official Charts)	1
US Billboard 200	93

Chart (2017)	Peak position
UK Dance Albums (Official Charts)	30

== Certifications and sales ==
Region	Certification	Certified units/sales
Belgium (BRMA)	Gold	25,000^{*}
Germany	—	65,000
Japan (RIAJ)	Gold	120,000
Netherlands (NVPI)	Gold	50,000^{^}
United Kingdom (BPI)	Gold	100,000^{^}
United States	—	100,000
Summaries
Asia	—	80,000
^{*} Sales figures based on certification alone.^{^} Shipments figures based on certification alone.
