= Push Upstairs =

1999 single by Underworld

Single by Underworld

from the album Beaucoup Fish
- B-side: "Please Help Me"
- Released: 15 March 1999
- Length: 4:34
- Label: JBO, V2
- Songwriters: Rick Smith, Karl Hyde, Darren Emerson
- Producers: Rick Smith, Karl Hyde, Darren Emerson

Underworld singles chronology
| "Moaner" (1997) | "Push Upstairs" (1999) | "Jumbo" (1999) |

"Push Upstairs" is a song by British electronic music group Underworld from their fifth album, Beaucoup Fish. It was released as a single on 15 March 1999. In business, to "push upstairs" means to promote someone either unwillingly or with an ulterior motive. The single peaked at number 12 on the UK Singles Chart.

== Track listings ==
UK CD1

1. "Push Upstairs" – 4:34
2. "Push Upstairs" (Roger S. Blue Plastic People mix) – 8:13
3. "Push Upstairs" (Adam Beyer Mix 1) – 4:56

UK CD2

1. "Push Upstairs" (The Large Unit) – 5:38
2. "Push Upstairs" (Darren Price mix) – 6:47
3. "Please Help Me" – 7:29

UK, US, and Japanese 12-inch single

A1. "Push Upstairs" – 4:34
A2. "Push Upstairs" (The Large Unit) – 5:38
B1. "Push Upstairs" (Roger S. Blue Plastic People mix) – 8:13

European CD single

1. "Push Upstairs" – 5:38
2. "Please Help Me" – 7:29

Australian CD single

1. "Push Upstairs" – 4:34
2. "Push Upstairs" (Adam Beyer Mix 1) – 4:56
3. "Push Upstairs" (Roger S. Blue Plastic People mix) – 8:13
4. "Push Upstairs" (Darren Price mix) – 6:47
5. "Please Help Me" – 7:29

Japanese CD single

1. "Push Upstairs" – 4:34
2. "Push Upstairs" (Adam Beyer Mix 1) – 4:56
3. "Push Upstairs" (Roger S. Blue Plastic People mix) – 8:13
4. "Push Upstairs" (Darren Price mix) – 6:47
5. "Push Upstairs" (The Large Unit) – 5:38
6. "Please Help Me" – 7:29

== Charts ==
=== Weekly charts ===
| Chart (1999) | Peak position |
|---|---|
| Australia (ARIA) | 78 |
| Belgium (Ultratop 50 Flanders) | 58 |
| Canada Dance/Urban (RPM) | 22 |
| Europe (Eurochart Hot 100) | 46 |
| Netherlands (Single Top 100) | 79 |
| Scottish Singles Sales (Official Charts) | 14 |
| UK Singles (Official Charts) | 12 |
| UK Dance (Official Charts) | 8 |
| UK Indie (Official Charts) | 3 |
| US Dance Club Songs (Billboard) | 38 |

=== Year-end charts ===
| Chart (1999) | Position |
|---|---|
| UK Club Chart (Music Week) | 40 |

== Release history ==
| Region | Date | Format(s) | Label(s) | Ref(s). |
|---|---|---|---|---|
| United Kingdom | 15 March 1999 | 12-inch vinyl; CD | JBO; V2 | |
| Japan | 20 March 1999 | 12-inch vinyl; CD | JBO; V2 | |
