= Kool FM =

Former London pirate radio station

- London; England
- Frequency: 9A (London DAB)

Programming
- Format: Jungle, drum and bass, old skool rave

History
- First air date: 28 November 1991
- Former frequencies: 94.5 / 94.6 FM (as a pirate)

Links
- Website: https://rinse.fm/channels/kool/

Kool FM, also known as Kool London, is a former London pirate radio station that now broadcasts on DAB and online, playing jungle, drum and bass, and old skool. Kool is generally regarded as being instrumental in the development of the jungle music scene.

== History ==
Kool first broadcast on 28 November 1991 on the frequency of 94.5FM, from Clapton, North East London. Kool has stated that it was "the very first pirate station ever to play hardcore jungle". Simon Reynolds would call it "London's ruling pirate station" in an account of the beginnings of jungle in his book Energy Flash, whilst in State of Bass, Martin James would consider it "The single most important pirate station in jungle".

By late 1992, Kool started to promote its own events, leading to the founding of Jungle Fever in August 1993. Jungle Fever nights have been held at venues such as the Astoria and The Edge.

In July 1993, its then-neighbouring station also broadcasting from the Nightingale Estate, Rush FM, was subject to a high profile raid by the authorities leading to media accusations of drug dealing at raves promoted by the two stations.

In April 1996, Kool was featured in a BBC First Sight documentary about pirate radio in London, in which its Kool Skool club night also appeared. In the same year, it branched out by launching a sister station, Kool FM Midlands based in Birmingham, which continued until 2002.

In May 2007, Kool FM featured in a BBC London News report about pirate radio station interference to the emergency services and their use of the airwaves.

== Kool London and online radio ==
Kool London logo 2010–2022

In August 2010, Kool relaunched as Kool London, operating as an online radio station, providing a live audio stream, archived shows, and a popular chatroom. It continued to promote events at venues such as Mass, the Coronet, and Electric Brixton.

== Legacy ==
DJs and MCs to appear on Kool have included key figures in jungle and drum and bass music, including Brockie, Det, DJ Ron, MC Navigator, Bryan Gee, MC 5-O, Moose, Andy C, Mampi Swift, DJ Dextrous, Devious D, Ragga Twins, Flirt, Skibadee, Shabba D, Nicky Blackmarket, Tonic, Stevie Hyper D, and Crissy Criss.

Kool has been involved in two live broadcasts with the artist Eddie Peake. The first in 2013 as part of his graduate final year project at the Royal Academy of Arts, and again in 2018 at the White Cube forming part of his Concrete Pitch show.

The station celebrated its 30th birthday on 28 November 2021, with an event at the Heaven club.

== Rinse FM management and return to Kool FM ==
On 1 January 2023, original co-founder Eastman retired from running of the station.

It was announced on 30 January, that Rinse FM would be taking over management of the station and re-launching back as Kool FM and with a revised line-up.

Having announced details of the updated line-up, Kool returned on 23 April 2023 broadcasting on Rinse's FM and DAB frequencies, as well as a dedicated channel.
