= LK (Carolina Carol Bela) =

Single by DJ Marky & XRS ft. Stamina MC
- Released: 8th July 2002
- Recorded: 2001
- Songwriters: DJ Marky, XRS, and Stamina MC
- Producers: DJ Marky and XRS

"LK (Carolina Carol Bela)", sometimes referred to as "It's the Way", is a 2002 drum and bass song by DJ Marky, XRS, and Stamina MC which reached No. 17 on the UK Singles Chart. It has been described as "seminal" by NME, and samples Toquinho & Jorge Ben's "Carolina Carol Bela". Piri & Tommy have performed it in concert and cited it as an inspiration for their 2024 EP About Dancing.

== DJ Marky version ==
"LK" was produced in XRS's studio after DJ Marky was told by Marcus Intalex about his interest in starting a new drum and bass record label, which would become known as Soul:R.

At first, they attempted to recreate the sound of Ed Rush and Optical's "Wormhole" but scrapped it due to failing to match their sound.

"LK" was originally an instrumental, and samples vocals and guitar from Toquinho and Jorge Ben's "Carolina Carol Bela", the B-side of "Que Maravilha". The song's title, "LK", is a truncated form of "Liquid Kitchen", an epithet given to the song by DJ Marky after coming back from XRS's studio and walking in on his mother washing up. A different title, in reference to DJ Patife, was considered, but had been dropped for "LK".

Once completed, it was first given to Marcus Intalex with the intention of it being signed and released onto Soul:R, who told DJ Marky that it was "a shit tune." ST Files, close collaborator with Marcus Intalex (under the alias M.I.S.T) and co-founder of Soul:R, expressed interest in "LK" but ultimately sided with Marcus Intalex's decision to not sign "LK".

Due to the harsh feedback and rejection by Soul:R, DJ Marky made a career decision to only DJ rather than produce records.

Bryan Gee was later given "LK" after meeting with DJ Marky in Miami and persuaded him to give up any new tracks, though DJ Marky was reluctant after the negative feedback by Soul:R. It was signed to V Recordings and released in 2002.

After a tour in Brazil, DJ Marky returned to the United Kingdom to find himself inundated with requests to play "It's the Way", a title based on what Stamina MC had been freestyling over the record. Not knowing what they meant, he wondered whether they meant DJ Tactix's 1994 jungle track of the same name; after finding that crowds were singing Stamina MC's lyrics at performances, Stamina MC was brought into the studio to record an official vocal. This version was playlisted by BBC Radio 1, charted at No. 17 on the UK Singles Chart, and was performed on Top of the Pops. The track was played in the United States, which caught the attention of Jorge Ben's son Gabriel; the question of paying royalties for sampling "Carolina Carol Bela" was resolved when Toquinho approved of the sample.

After the overwhelming success of both versions of "LK", Marcus Intalex and ST Files have since been regretful of their decision to pass on "LK". According to ST Files, "Marky sent us 'LK'. I thought it was amazing, but we were a bit scared of it. I went to something afterwards where Bryan Gee played it, and it was massive. It was a bit too late then for us. Sometimes you should trust your instinct. Maybe it was too 'happy'."

A remix by Marcus Intalex and ST Files was later released due to DJ Marky wanting to give friendly payback towards the duo for not signing "LK" to Soul:R.

== Piri & Tommy version ==
"LK" was the first song Piri & Tommy covered in concert, starting in 2021. Jeremy Abbott of NME thought their cover was a particular highlight of their performance at Reading and Leeds Festival in 2022, describing their rendition as "bouncy", and noted that observing "a rabble of enthusiastic teens flailing to a drum'n'bass classic released years before they were born proves that the old can still very much be gold". The pair cited the track as an inspiration for their 2024 EP About Dancing.
