= List of Red Bull Music Academy lecturers =

This is a list of all people who have lectured at the Red Bull Music Academy since its foundation in 1998.

== A ==
- A Guy Called Gerald
- A-Trak
- Aba Shanti-I
- Adam Freeland
- Addison Groove
- Adrian Sherwood
- African Dope
- Ahmir "Questlove" Thompson
- Akim Walta
- Alec Empire
- Alex Barck
- Alex Droener
- Alex Rosner
- Alex Smoke
- Alex Tumay
- Alexander Bretz
- Alexander Hacke
- Alexander Robotnick
- Ali Shaheed Muhammad
- Alice Russell
- Alva Noto
- Alvin Lucier
- Amp Fiddler
- Analogue Freestyle
- Andre Langenfeld
- Andrew Jervis
- Andrew Scheps
- Andrew Weatherall
- Anton Delecca
- Appleblim
- Arabian Prince
- Architecture in Helsinki
- Arthur Baker
- Arthur Verocai
- Arto Lindsay
- Arturo Lanz
- Artwork
- ASAP Rocky
- Atilano Gonzalez-Perez

== B ==
- Barnt
- Bass Dee
- Bass Odyssey
- Bassface Sascha
- Ben Long
- Ben UFO
- Benga
- Benjamin Wright Jr.
- Benny Sings
- Bernard Purdie
- Bernie Worrell
- Bettina Costanzo
- Bez Roberts
- Biz Markie
- Björk
- Black Coffee
- Black Milk
- Black Moon
- Blu
- Bob Humid
- Bob Moog
- Bob Power
- Boi-1da
- Bok Bok
- Bootsy Collins
- Brendan M Gillen
- Brent Fischer
- Brian Cross aka B+
- Brian Eno
- Brian Fallon
- Brian Jackson
- Brian Reitzell
- Bugge Wesseltoft
- Bun B
- Buraka Som Sistema
- Burle Avant
- Busy P

== C ==
- C-Rock
- Caribou
- Carl Craig
- Carl McIntosh
- Carly Starr
- Carola Stoiber
- Cathy Smith
- Cerrone
- Charlie Dark
- Charlie Hall
- Charlotte Gainsbourg
- Che Pope
- Chez Damier
- Chilly Gonzales
- Chloé
- Chris Baio
- Chris Jordi
- Chris Palmer
- Chris Stein
- Christian "Flake" Lorenz
- Christian Tjaben
- Chuck D
- Ciaran Cahill
- Claire Maloney
- Clams Casino
- Clare Fischer
- Claude Young
- Claudio Coccoluto
- Claudio Rispoli
- Claudio Simonetti
- Clé
- Clive Chin
- Cluster
- Conrad von Loehneysen
- Cosey Fanni Tutti
- Cosmo
- Craig Leon
- Cristian Vogel
- Cut Chemist

== D ==
- D-Bridge
- D'Angelo
- Dabrye
- Daito Manabe
- Dâm-Funk
- Damian Harris
- Dan Dalton
- Dan Stevens
- Dandy Jack
- Daniel Wang
- Daniele Baldelli
- Danny Breaks
- Danny Brown
- Danny Krivit
- Danny Thompson
- Darren Aronofsky
- Darshan Jesrani
- Dave Haslam
- Dave Ralph
- Dave Smith
- David Holmes
- David Matthews
- David Nerattini
- David Rodigan
- David Steele
- David Swindells
- Daz-I-Kue
- Deadbeat
- Debbie Harry
- Dego
- Dengue Dengue Dengue!
- Dennis Bovell
- Dennis Coffey
- Dennis White
- Derf Reklaw
- Derrick Carter
- Derrick May
- Dev Hynes
- Digital
- Dirk Linnewebber
- Dittmar Frohmann
- Dixon
- Dizzee Rascal
- DJ Assault
- DJ Babu
- DJ Craze
- DJ Dahi
- DJ Day
- DJ Deep
- DJ Drama
- DJ ESP
- DJ Food
- DJ Godfather
- DJ Harvey
- DJ Magic Mike
- DJ Mehdi
- DJ Premier
- DJ Radar
- DJ Rashad
- DJ Red Alert
- DJ Spinn
- DJ Toomp
- Domu
- Don Buchla
- Don Letts
- Don Cannon
- Dorian Moore
- Dr Bob Jones
- Dre Skull
- Dudley Perkins
- Dylan Carlson
- DZ Cuts

== E ==
- Earl Gateshead
- Ectomorph
- Ed Handley
- Eduardo Marote
- Efdemin
- Egyptian Lover
- El Guincho
- El-P
- Elmar Krick
- Emmanuel Jagari Chanda
- Eoin Brians
- Erlend Øye
- Erykah Badu
- Eumir Deodato
- Ewan Pearson
- Exile

== F ==
- Fabio
- Fabio de Luca
- FaltyDL
- Fatima Al Qadiri
- Fennesz
- Fion Higgins
- Flying Lotus
- Francesco Tristano
- Francisco López
- François K
- Frank Tope
- Frankie Knuckles
- Front 242

== G ==
- Gabriel Roth
- Gareth Jones
- Gary Bartz
- Gaspar Noé
- George Clinton
- George Stavropoulos
- Georgia Anne Muldrow
- Gerald 'Jazzman' Short
- Gerald Mitchell
- Gerd Gummersbach
- Gerriet Schulz
- Giggs
- Gilb'r
- Gilberto Gil
- Gilles Peterson
- Giorgio Moroder
- Glen Brady
- Glenn Branca
- Goldie
- Gotan Project
- Grandwizard Theodore
- Greg Phillinganes
- Greg Wilson
- Gyedu Blay-Ambolley

== H ==
- Hank Shocklee
- Hans Nieswandt
- Harold Faltermeyer
- Harry Russell
- Haruomi Hosono
- Heiko M/S/O
- Henrik Schwarz
- Herb Powers Jr.
- Hip Tanaka
- Holly Herndon
- Howard Bilerman
- Howie Weinberg
- Hudson Mohawke
- Hugh Masekela
- Hymnal

== I ==
- I-f
- IG Culture
- Ian Dewhirst
- Iggy Pop
- Invisibl Skratch Piklz
- Isao Tomita
- Ivan Smagghe

== J ==
- J Da Flex
- J Majik
- J-Rocc
- Jacques Greene
- Jah Shaka
- Jam & Lewis
- James Barton
- James Gadson
- James Holden
- James Murphy
- James Pants
- James Pennington
- Jammin' Unit
- Jason Bentley
- Jay Ahern
- Jay Electronica
- Jazzie B
- Jean-Michel Jarre
- Jef K
- Jeff Mills
- Jeremy Greenspan
- Jeremy Harding
- Jesse Saunders
- Jimmy Douglass
- Joan La Barbara
- Joe Bataan
- Joe Boyd
- Joe Goddard
- Joe Zavaglia
- Joel Martin
- John Acquaviva
- John Dent
- John Reynolds
- John Stapleton
- John Talabot
- John Tejada
- Jonathan Rudnick
- Jono Podmore
- Jordi Lloveras
- Joseph Ghosn
- Juan Atkins
- Juana Molina
- Julia Holter
- Julian Ringel
- Junior Marvin
- Just Blaze

== K ==
- Ka (rapper)
- Kabuki
- Kardinal Offishall
- Kaytranada
- Keiji Haino
- Kemistry & Storm
- Ken Scott
- Kerri Chandler
- Kieran Hebden
- Killa Kela
- Kim Gordon
- Kindness
- King Britt
- Kirk Degiorgio
- Klaus Goldhammer
- Kode9
- Krept & Konan
- Kristina Andersen
- Krust
- Kutcha Edwards

== L ==
- L'Orchestra di Piazza Vittorio
- La Monte Young
- Lætitia Sadier
- Larry Heard
- Lars Bartkuhn
- Lars Vegas
- Laurent Garnier
- Laurie Anderson
- Lee Hirsch
- Lee Scratch Perry
- Legowelt
- Leon Ware
- Leroy Burgess
- Lonnie Liston Smith
- Lorenzo Senni
- Luther Campbell

== M ==
- M.I.A.
- Mad Mats
- ’Mad’ Mike Banks
- Mad Professor
- Madlib
- Makoto
- Mala
- Malcolm Cecil
- Malcolm Catto
- Mannie Fresh
- Marc Hype
- Marco Passarani
- Marcus Intalex
- Mario Caldato Jr.
- Mark Arm
- Mark De Clive-Lowe
- Mark Jones
- Mark Pritchard
- Mark Rae
- Mark Ronson
- Marky
- Marley Marl
- Marshall Allen
- Marshall Jefferson
- Martin Morales
- Martin Schöpf
- Martyn
- Martyn Ware
- Maseo
- Masters At Work
- Matana Roberts
- Mathew Jonson
- Matias Aguayo
- Matmos
- Matthew Herbert
- Maurice Fulton
- Mauricio Bussab
- Megan Jasper
- Mel Cheren
- Melvin Van Peebles
- Metro Boomin
- MF Doom
- Michael Kummermehr
- Michael Mayer
- Michael Reinboth
- Michael Thorpe
- Michaela Melian
- Michel Gaubert
- Mike Gee
- Mike Paradinas
- Mike Q
- Mike WiLL Made-It
- Mira Calix
- Miss Djax
- Mixmaster Morris
- Mixologists
- Mizell Brothers
- MJ Cole
- Mo
- Mobb Deep
- Modeselektor
- Moodymann
- Morgan Geist
- Moritz von Oswald
- Morton Subotnick
- Move D
- Mtume
- Mu
- Mulatu Astatke

== N ==
- Neil Aline
- Neil Macey
- Nick Coplowe
- Nick Harris
- Nicky Siano
- Nicolas Godin
- Nicolay
- Nigel Godrich
- Nile Rodgers
- Norman Jay
- Nottz
- Nuts

== O ==
- Oh No
- Oisin Lunny
- Om'Mas Keith
- Oneohtrix Point Never
- Orlando Voorn
- Osunlade
- Otomo Yoshihide
- Owusu & Robin Hannibal

== P ==
- Papa Wemba
- Patife
- Patrice
- Patrick Adams
- Patrick Carpenter
- Patrick Forge
- Patrick Pulsinger
- Paul Bradshaw
- Paul de Barros
- Paul Humphrey
- Paul Kelly
- Paul Murphy
- Paul Riser
- Paul Woolford
- Pauline Oliveros
- Peaches
- Peanut Butter Wolf
- Pearson Sound
- Pépé Bradock
- Peshay
- Pete Holdsworth
- Pete Riley
- Peter Brötzmann
- Peter Decuypere
- Peter Grandl
- Peter Hook
- Peter Untersander
- Peter Zinovieff
- Phaderheadz
- Phil Asher
- Philip Glass
- Philippe Zdar
- Phonte
- Pierre Gagnon
- Plastician
- Prince Paul
- Prins Thomas

== Q ==
- Q-Tip
- Qua

== R ==
- Radio Slave
- Rakim
- Randy Muller
- Rashad Becker
- Ready D
- Recloose
- Richie Hawtin
- Rick Essig
- Ritu
- Roach & DJ Dope
- Rob Bowman
- Robert Hood
- Robert Feuchtl
- Robert Nesbitt
- Robert Ouimet
- Robert Owens
- Robert Rich
- Roberto Maxwell
- Roger Linn
- Roman Flügel
- Ron Trent
- Roots Manuva
- Roska
- Ross Allen
- RP Boo
- Rude Boy Paul
- Russell Elevado
- Ryoji Ikeda
- Ryuichi Sakamoto
- RZA

== S ==
- Sa-Ra Creative Partners
- Sal Principato
- Santa Cecilia Orchestra
- Santiago Salazar
- Sarah Stennett
- Sascha Lazimbat
- Sascha Vogt
- Saxon Soundsystem
- Scuba
- Sebastian Niessen
- Sebel
- Seiji
- Sergi Jordà
- Seth Troxler
- Shaheen Ariefdien
- Shane & Greg
- Sheila E.
- Shut Up & Dance
- Silver
- Sinden
- Sir Mix-A-Lot
- Skepta
- Skream
- Sleepy Brown
- Slick Rick
- Sly & Robbie
- Snowboy
- Sonny Digital
- Soulja
- Space DJz
- Spencer Weekes
- Spike Lee
- Spoony
- Steely & Clevie
- Steinski
- Stephen Mallinder
- Stephen O'Malley
- Steve Arrington
- Steve Beckett
- Steve Bunion
- Steve Reich
- Steve Spacek
- Stretch & Bobbito
- Strobocop
- Stuart Hawkes
- Supa DJ Dmitry
- Superpitcher
- Susan Rogers
- Susanne Kirchmayr
- Suzanne Ciani
- Sven Miracolo
- Sway

== T ==
- Tanya Tagaq
- Taz Arnold
- Teddy Riley
- Teki Latex
- Terre Thaemlitz
- Terry Farley
- The Bamboos
- The Black Madonna
- The Diplomats
- The Original Jazzy Jay
- Theo Parrish
- Thundercat
- Tiga
- Tim Hecker
- Tim ‘Love’ Lee
- Tim Westwood
- Tina Funk
- Todd Edwards
- Todd Osborn
- Todd Roberts
- Todd Rundgren
- Todd Simon
- tofubeats
- Tom Middleton
- Tom Moulton
- Tom Oberheim
- Tom Tom Club
- Tom Warrior
- Tom Zé
- Tony Allen
- Tony Andrews
- Tony Colman
- Tony Dawsey
- Tony Gable
- Tony Humphries
- Tony Nwachukwu
- Tony Visconti
- Toro y Moi
- Toshio Matsuura
- Toy Selectah
- Trevor Horn
- Trevor Jackson
- tUnE-yArDs
- Tutto Matto
- TY

== U ==
- Untold
- Uschi Classen
- Uther Mahmud
- Uwe Schmidt

== V ==
- Van Dyke Parks
- Veronica Vasicka
- Vince Degiorgio
- Volcov

== W ==
- Waajeed
- Wally Badarou
- Werner Herzog
- Westbam
- Wheedle’s Groove
- Win Butler
- Winston Hazel
- Wolfgang Voigt
- Woody McBride
- Wu-Tang Clan

== X ==
- X-Ecutioners
- Xavier Veilhan
- XRS

== Y ==
- Young Fathers
- Young Guru

== Z ==
- Zaytoven
- Ze Gonzales
- Zed Bias
- Zinc
