= FabricLive.18 =

Compilation album by Andy C and DJ Hype
- Released: 18 October 2004
- Genre: Drum and bass, electronica
- Length: 66:30
- Label: Fabric
- Producer: Andy C and DJ Hype

FabricLive chronology
FabricLive.17 (2004)	FabricLive.18 (2004)	FabricLive.19 (2004)

FabricLive.18 is a DJ mix compilation album produced by Andy C and DJ Hype, as part of the FabricLive series. It was released on 18 October 2004 by the Fabric record label. The album is the second in the series to be produced by DJ Hype, who also produced FabricLive.03.

FabricLive.18 is the first collaboration between Andy C and DJ Hype. The first half of the album was mixed by DJ Hype, and includes the previously unreleased track "Submission" from his label Ganja Records, as well as his special edits of "Can You Feel It" and "Comin at Ya". Andy C mixed the second half of the album, which includes the track "Night Vision" by his side project Ram Trilogy.

== Track listing ==
1. DJ Friction & K-Tee - The Militia - Shogun Audio - 4:01
2. JB - Can You Feel It (DJ Hype Special) - Back 2 Basics - 3:35
3. Future Prophecies - Dreadlock - Breakbeat Kaos - 5:02
4. D-Type - Slam - Beatz - 3:13
5. A Sides (ft. MC Fats) - Bring Dat - True Playaz - 3:36
6. The Militia (K-Tee & Nu Balance) - Bad Move - Shogun Audio - 3:14
7. 2 tracks mixed:
  1. Andy C & Shimon - Body Rock - Ram
  2. J Majik & Wickaman - Swallow Ya Soul - Infrared - 3:58
8. Potential Bad Boy (ft. Spikey T) - Submission - Ganja Records - 4:30
9. J Majik & Wickaman - Spycatcher - Infrared - 3:35
10. Krust - Follow Da Vision - Full Cycle - 4:40
11. Benny Blanco - Coming At Ya (DJ Hype Special) - Back 2 Basics - 3:13
12. J Majik - You Disgust Me - Infrared - 3:33
13. Shimon & Moving Fusion - Now's The Time - Ram - 2:21
14. Shimon & Moving Fusion - Mysterons - Ram - 1:47
15. Ed Rush & Optical - Bacteria (Pendulum Remix) - Breakbeat Kaos/Virus - 2:31
16. DJ Fresh - Tomb Raider - Dogs On Acid - 3:08
17. Zen - Turnstyle (Baron Remix) - Grid Recordings - 2:09
18. Top Buzz - Living In Darkness (Phantasy & Shodan 2004 Remix) - 3:19
19. Decorum - Contrax (Weapon Remix) - Liftin' Spirits - 2:30
20. Ram Trilogy - Night Vision - Ram - 2:35

== Personnel ==
The following people contributed to FabricLive.18.

- Andy C – production, mixing
- DJ Hype – mixing
- Tony Anthun – production
- Jason Ball – production
- Damien Burke – production
- J Majik – production
- MC Fats – production
- Potential Bad Boy – production
- Matt Quinn – production
- Ben Settle – production
- Shimon – production
- Daniel Sparham – production
- Sam Stone – production
- Top Buzz – production
- Piers Baron Bailey – remixing
- Rob Swire – remixing
- Weapon – remixing
