= Origin Unknown =

English electronic music duo

- Also known as: Concept 2; Desired State
- Origin: England, United Kingdom
- Genres: Drum and bass; jungle
- Years active: 1990–2004
- Labels: RAM
- Members: Andy C; Ant Miles

Origin Unknown were an English electronic music duo comprising Andy C and Ant Miles. Producing drum and bass music, they are best known for their 1993 song "Valley of the Shadows", originally released as the B-side of "The Touch", before its re-release as a standalone single in 1996, both through Andy C's RAM Records.

In addition to this, the duo's 2002 re-release of their 1995 song "Truly One" entered the UK Singles and UK Dance singles charts at positions 53 and seven respectively, and they also produced "Hotness" with Dynamite MC for his 2004 debut studio album, World of Dynamite. They have also remixed music for acts including DJ Hype, Dieselboy, Adam F, Adam Freeland and High Contrast. The duo would later form Ram Trilogy with fellow producer Shimon.

== Discography ==
| Title | Year | Charts | | Album |
| Title | Year | UK | UK Dance | Album |
|---|---|---|---|---|
| "The Touch" / "Valley of the Shadows" | 1993 | — | — | Non-album singles |
| "Truly One" / "Mission Control" | 1995 | — | — | Non-album singles |
| "Valley of the Shadows" | 1996 | 60 | 3 | Non-album singles |
| "Sound in Motion" | 2000 | — | — | Non-album singles |
| "Truly One" | 2002 | 53 | 7 | Non-album singles |
| "Hotness" (with Dynamite MC) | 2003 | 66 | 4 | World of Dynamite |
| "Grudge Match" | 2004 | — | — | Non-album single |
"—" denotes a recording that did not chart or was not released in that territory.
