= Fernanda Porto =

Brazilian singer (born 1965)

Fernanda Porto, or Maria Fernanda Dutra Clemente (Serra Negra, Brazil, December 31, 1965), is a Brazilian drum 'n' bossa singer. Drum 'n' bossa is a combination of electronic music, bossa nova and drum 'n' bass. Along with DJ Patife, her song "Sambassim" became popular in Brazil and many countries in Europe. DJ Marky later remixed it. Another song remixed was "Só Tinha Ser Com Você". She has also worked with American pop music producer Mark Holiday from Miami (also known as Trendsetter).

== Discography ==
- 2002 - Fernanda Porto
- 2004 - Giramundo
- 2006 - The Best Of Fernanda Porto
- 2006 - Ao Vivo (Live)
- 2009 - Auto Retrato

== Appears on ==
- 2001 - Cool Steps
- 2001 - Sambaloco

== Soundtrack ==
- 2006 - Cabra Cega
