= Sascha Lazimbat =

Sascha Lazimbat (born 1970 in Cologne) is a German entrepreneur, lawyer and music journalist. After writing primarily about electronic music in the 1990s (e.g. for German music magazine Spex and techno magazine Frontpage), in 2004 he founded the company Zebralution together with Kurt Thielen as the first digital distributor for indie labels in Europe. In December 2019, GEMA acquired a majority stake in Zebralution.

== Career ==
=== Legal ===
Lazimbat studied law at the University of Cologne from 1990 to 1995. In 1995, he passed the first state examination in law at the Cologne Regional Court. From 1996 to 1998, he completed his legal internship in Berlin, Hamburg and London. The second state examination in law followed in 1998 at the Kammergericht Berlin. From 1998 to 1999, he worked as a lawyer in the Hamburg media law firm Zimmermann & Decker. He has a double license as a lawyer and syndicate lawyer in Berlin.

=== Journalist ===
From 1992 to 2005, Lazimbat was a freelance writer and editor for numerous music magazines and lifestyle magazines, including Spex, Berlin lifestyle magazine Style & The Family Tunes, techno magazine Frontpage, and music magazine Groove. He also worked for music television broadcaster Viva TV. From 1995 to 1996, he was chief of staff and deputy editor-in-chief of Frontpage. He was a trend scout for companies like Adidas and part of the development team that designed the Red Bull Music Academy in 1997. In this context, he also gave lectures in Berlin in 1998 and in Dublin in 1999.

=== Media Manager ===
After a year as assistant to the board at Senator Entertainment (film production and distribution), he became manager at Vodafone from 2001 to 2005. From 2001 to 2002, as business development manager at the joint venture of Vodafone and VivendiUniversal for mobile services and content named Vizzavi, and then from 2002 to 2005, as Head of Music & Video at Vodafone, he was responsible for all music and video services such as the business with ringtones and realtones, the development and introduction of new innovative services such as MusicFinder and development and launch of the world's first dual delivery full-track music download service.

== Zebralution ==
In 2004, he founded, with Kurt Thielen, the startup Zebralution as a digital distributor for independent labels, in which he was co-managing director until the complete takeover by Warner Music in 2010. From 2007 to 2010, he worked in parallel as Managing Director Business & Corporate Development at Warner Music.

In 2010, A2 Electronic Publishing, a digital distributor for e-books, was founded. With Lazimbat as managing director, the company took over the digital distribution for publishers such as Bastei Lübbe, and Orell Füssli. In 2012, the e-book distribution business was taken over by Zebralution, with Lazimbat as consultant for this business area. He also worked as a consultant for digital companies such as tape.tv, FATdrop, Magix, Stagelink, Ampya, Magic Internet and Pluto TV.

Effective April 1, 2017, Lazimbat bought back Zebralution from Warner Music as part of a four-member consortium with Kurt Thielen, Christof Ellinghaus (City Slang) and Konrad von Löhneysen (Embassy of Music) and returned to Zebralution as Chief Operating Officer & General Counsel. In connection with the expansion of the business to spoken word content such as audio books, the podcast subsidiary company zebra-audio.net was founded. In 2019, Zebralution bought the technical service provider Encoding Management Service (EMS), with which the company had been working since 2005.

On December 4, 2019, the German collecting society GEMA acquired a majority stake of 75.1 percent in Zebralution. Lazimbat remained, like Thielen, managing partner.
