= FabricLive.03 =

Compilation album by DJ Hype
- Released: April 2002
- Genre: Electronic music
- Length: 1:13:41
- Label: Fabric
- Producer: DJ Hype

DJ Hype chronology
The Dogs... (1999)	FabricLive.03 (2002)	Jungle Massive Presents 21st Century Breakbeat (2002)

FabricLive chronology
FabricLive.02 (2002)	FabricLive.03 (2002)	FabricLive.04 (2002)

Professional ratings
Review scores
Source	Rating
Resident Advisor	3.5/5 stars

FabricLive.03 is a DJ mix compilation album by DJ Hype, as part of the FabricLive Mix Series.

== Track listing ==
No.	Title	Length
1.	"Thunderball" (featuring Moving Fusion)	5:11
2.	"Mars" (featuring DJ Brockie and Ed Solo)	3:19
3.	"Mistical Dub" (featuring Mist:i:Cal)	3:07
4.	"Planet Dust" (featuring Untranslated)	3:31
5.	"Ska" (featuring DJ Zinc)	4:01
6.	"Squash" (featuring Total Science)	3:28
7.	"The Lighter" (featuring Sound Of The Future)	3:28
8.	"Jah" (featuring Trinity)	4:51
9.	"Rodeo" (featuring Untranslated)	4:23
10.	"Nightmare Walking" (featuring Future Prophecies)	4:56
11.	"Super2Bad" (featuring Bonafide)	2:55
12.	"Swingtime" (featuring Mis:i:Cal)	3:49
13.	"Snapped It" (featuring Krust)	5:50
14.	"Casino Royale" (featuring DJ Zinc)	5:06
15.	"True Playaz Style"	4:23
16.	"Jazz Juice" (featuring Pascal)	3:08
17.	"Body Rock" (featuring Andy C and Shimon)	4:47
18.	"Grimey" (featuring Dillinja)	3:28
