= Eruption Radio =

- England
- Frequencies: 8A (East London and SW Essex DAB)

Programming
- Format: House, breakbeat hardcore, happy hardcore, drum and bass

History
- First air date: 17 February 1993 (as a pirate); 17 May 2019 (online); 2 February 2021 (DAB)
- Former frequencies: 101.3 FM

Links
- Website: www.eruptionradio.uk

Eruption Radio is a London-based radio station that broadcasts online and on DAB playing house, breakbeat and happy hardcore, and drum and bass as well as other genres. Eruption Radio originally started life in February 1993 as Eruption FM, a pirate radio station broadcasting from Waltham Forest, East London, broadcasting until February 2012.

Eruption returned as an online station on 17 May 2019, and then DAB on 2 February 2021. Eruption broadcasts on North East London and South West Essex SSDAB.

Notable presenters and DJs have included DJ Zinc, Billy Daniel Bunter, Nicky Blackmarket, DJ Hype, DJ Swift, Clarky, Slipmatt, Model (of Liquid), and Ray Keith.
