= Stamina MC =

British musician

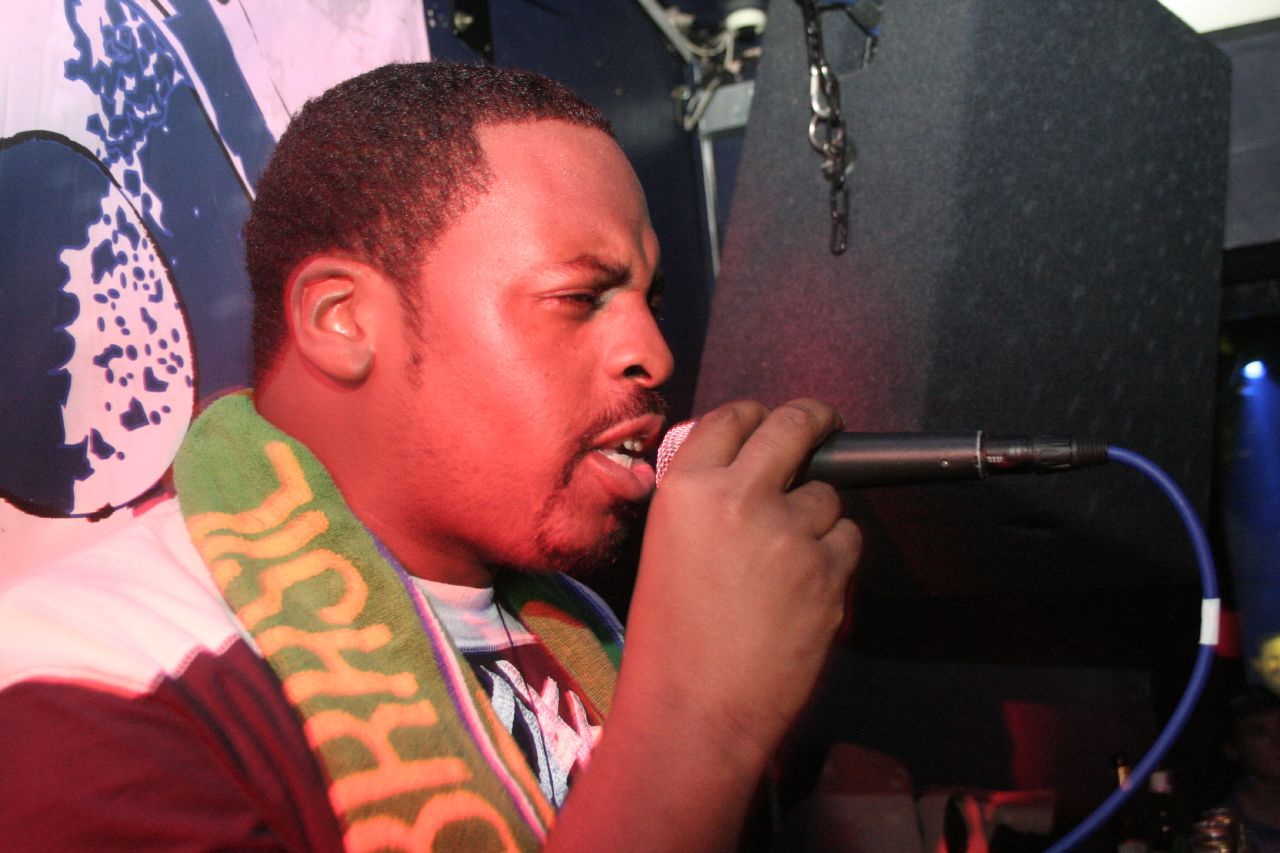
Stamina MC performing in 2007

Linden Reeves, better known as Stamina MC, is an English drum and bass rapper and singer.

== Biography ==
His earliest experiences of MCing were on pirated radio in 1996; first Pressure FM (inactive), then on to currently active, once-pirate-but-no-longer station Rinse FM. In 2000, he met DJ Marky, DJ Patife and XRS Land, through being given a trial opportunity to perform at Movement, a weekly drum & bass event in London.

He is best known for providing vocals for two successful Drum & Bass tracks entitled "LK" by DJ Marky and XRS Land (released 8 July 2002 on V Recordings) and "Barcelona" by D. Kay and Epsilon (released 11 August 2003 on BC Authorised/BMG). These tracks achieved UK chart positions of #17 and #14 respectively.

He was also part of the original line up for the London Elektricity LIVE band (alongside Andy Waterworth, Jungle Drummer, Lianne Carroll, Tim Landslide and Robert Owens), touring the country with them and featuring on the 'Live Gravy' DVD, filmed at the Jazz Café in October 2003 and released on Hospital Records. Further live exploits came in the form of 'CPF Live' - an act put together by Craggz and Parallel Forces to support their album release on Valve Recordings entitled 'Northern Soul'.

Presently Stamina still tours with Marky, and has also in recent times garnered an affiliation with Shy FX, performing with him and also being involved with projects on Digital Soundboy.
