= MC Skibadee =

British jungle musician (1975–2022)

- Also known as: Skibs, Skiba
- Born: Alphonso Bondzie; 1 February 1975; Waterloo, London, England
- Died: 27 February 2022 (aged 47)
- Genres: Drum and bass, jungle, hip hop, breakbeat
- Years active: 1993–2022

Alphonso Castro K. Bondzie (1 February 1975 – 27 February 2022), better known as MC Skibadee, was a British recording artist and drum and bass MC. Widely regarded as one of the pillars of UK MCing, Skibadee, along with his peers, pioneered an MC-focused sound within the Jungle and Drum and Bass genres. This foundational period of music heavily influenced subsequent generations of artists across multiple genres, paving the way for UK Hip-Hop, Grime and UK Drill.

== Career ==
Skibadee was inspired to become an MC after attending a jungle rave in the early 1990s and hearing MC Det, the Ragga Twins and Navigator. Skibadee started on City Sound Radio in 1993 featuring on the Live and Direct show, with DJs Pro-D and Cyrus, and by early 1995 he regularly featured at jungle music events such as Thunder & Joy and Spirit of the Jungle, as well as his regular spot on radio. By the end of 1995, he was resident for the London pirate radio station Kool FM, and regularly featured at events such as Jungle Fever, New Jack City, and Innersense. Along with MC Det of Kool FM, he launched a new project called 2Xfreestyle in late 1997, which involved putting a drum and bass tempo over a hip-hop beat, therefore creating a "double time" effect. He would often perform this style with its innovator Stevie Hyper D.

The single and subsequent video "Inside Me" was a success and after being accepted on MTV and The Box. In 1999, he received the first of three the Knowledge Awards for best MC, and three Accelerated Culture Awards. Since 2000, he began collaborating with MC Shabba D (also known as Shabba) which became the partnership commonly known as "S.A.S." and became synonymous with the raves Telepathy and One Nation. In 2003, he provided the vocals for Dillinja's UK chart-breaking "Twist Em Out".

In 2006 he won the 1Xtra Award for best MC and in 2007 he won best MC southwest Drum n Bass award. In 2008 and 2009, Skibadee won best Lyrical MC and best Hype MC in the national Drum and bass awards and 2010 is the third year in a row as the best Crowd Hyper MC as well as the Stevie Hyper D Lifetime Achievement Award. In 2010, he won best MC at the Drum & Bass Arena Awards. Skibadee has been described as being a defining person within drum and bass, and has been credited with having a pivotal impact on music genres that were influenced by jungle music, such as garage, grime and drill.

== Personal life and death ==
Bondzie was born in Waterloo, London on 1 February 1975. In 2019, he auctioned two outfits to raise money for The Sickle Cell Society. He died on 27 February 2022, at the age of 47. Friends and collaborators described him as "always reinventing himself to remain on top of his game" (Eksman), as being someone who "always put other people first" (Harry Shotta), and that "anyone who’s on a stage and spits double-time bars is indebted to Skibadee" (Mampi Swift). Ghetts described being "inspired by him growing up", Goldie described him as being "a MASSIVE MASSIVE part of our culture", and DJ Frost commented that "MCs from all genre’s all looked up to him and was inspired by how good he was".
