= Workout (disambiguation) =

A workout is a session in which physical exercise is performed.

Work out or workout may also refer to:

== Music ==
=== Albums ===
- Workout (album), by Hank Mobley
- Workout, by Hal Kemp

=== Songs ===
- "Workout" (RuPaul song), 2004
- "Workout", a song from the musical Golden Boy
- "Workout", a 1982 song by Cerrone
- "Haunting / Workout", a 2013 song by Andy C
- "Work Out", a 2011 song by J. Cole
- "Work Out", a 2018 song by Chance the Rapper
- "Work Out", a 1960 song by Baby Washington

== Television ==
- Work Out (TV series), a reality television series
- Work Out New York, a reality television series

== Finance ==
- Workout (finance), an out-of-court debt restructuring

== See also ==
- Exercise (disambiguation)
