= Danny Donnelly =

- Occupation: Chairman

Danny Donnelly is the founder of drum and bass/rave label Suburban Base Records. He is the creator/owner of many album brands, having collected over 50 platinum and gold disc awards to date. He is currently the chairman and founder of Pure Film Productions, and has written, directed and produced numerous British featured films. One of his biggest achievements came in the shape of his influential drum and bass label Suburban Base and the compilation album brands Pure Garage, Pure DnB and Pure Euphoria.

== Album brands ==
In 2000, after leaving the Suburban Base Records, Danny joined an acquaintance with experience in sales and marketing to form Tailormade Music. Tailormade specialises in Compilation albums, including titles such as DriveTime, All Woman, Pure Grooves, and Funky Divas. Some of their concepts are licensed to labels such as Sony, Universal, and Warner Bros. Records.

The collaboration has also spawned several publishing companies & record labels, including Trance Euphoric label ‘Liquid Asset’.

In the following 5 years, the company was responsible for album brands including Pure Garage, (DJ EZ), and Pure R&B (Firin' Squad), and Euphoria.

== Film industry ==
Donnelly founded Pure Film Productions in 2010, co-producing the films The Tapes and The Magnificent Eleven in 2011.

Donnelly has also taken on more of a creative role in his film productions, writing a number of screenplays and directing the movie Payback Season.
