= DJ Ron =

British DJ (born 1967)

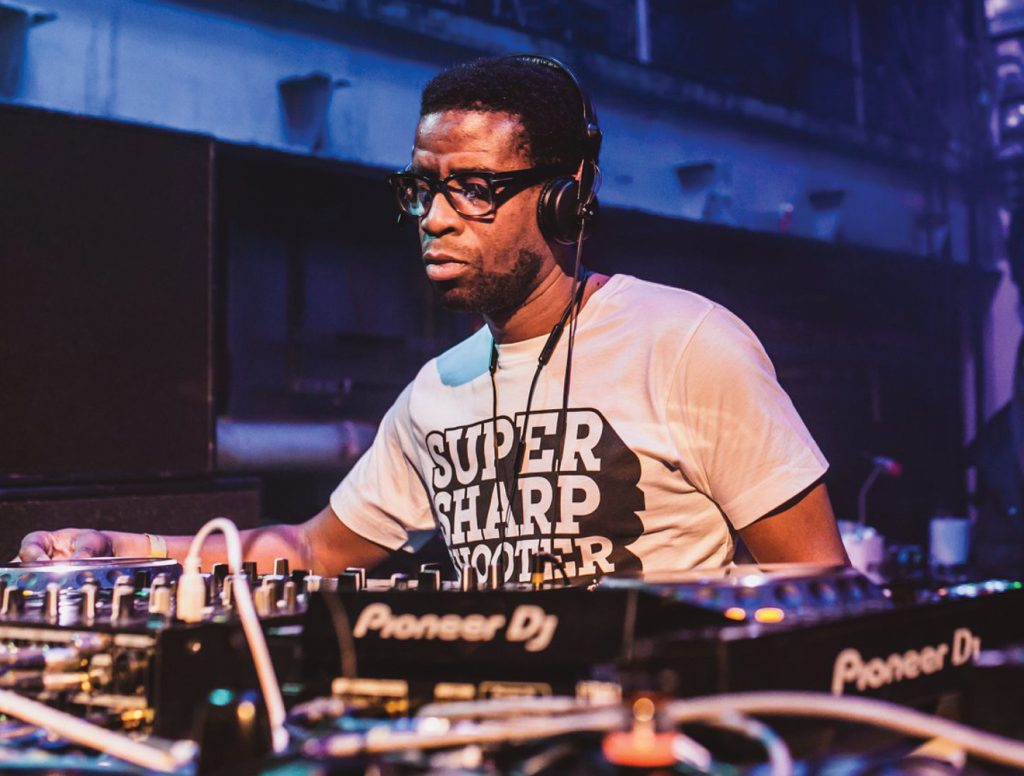
- DJ Ron performing for Chase and Status at Printworks London on the RTRN II Jungle Tour 2018

Background information
- Also known as: Mo Music · Musical Abstract Art · Sarsaparilla Kid · The Golden Child · Starsky
- Born: Ron Samuels; 22 October 1967 (age 58); London, England
- Genres: Drum and bass · jungle
- Occupation: DJ · record producer · film maker
- Years active: 1982–present
- Label: London Some'ting · LSR/P · Parousia · Rough Tone · No Frills · Pimp
- Website: bpmartists.com/portfolio-artist/dj-ron/

Ron Samuels, better known as DJ Ron, is a British jungle and drum and bass DJ, record producer, and film maker.

== Biography ==
=== Early life ===
Ron was born in 1967, in London. In the early 1980s, he began his career in music culture starting with his involvement in the body popping crew, Popping Wizards. As a second-generation Caribbean immigrant growing up in East London in the 1980s, both Ron's Guyanese heritage and his London surroundings influenced his musical taste. In his adolescent years, Ron practised DJing and scratching in his bedroom, with his friends Rodney P and MC Mell'O'. His passion for scratching was influenced by both Master MC from Rapattack sound system and Malcolm McLaren's album Duck Rock.

== Career ==
=== 1982–1992: Early projects and success ===
After playing on his elder brother's sound system Romancers Delight, Ron was spotted by the East London sound system, TNT Road-Show Sound System, which he played on between 1982 and 1986. With his time with TNT and additionally playing at two key events, one being a sound clash at Acton Town Hall, 'Soul All Dayer of the Century' (1987) and the other being an event at Loyola Hall, Ron's public appearance grew.

With that, Ron and Rebel MC met and began working together. First, playing together on the Beatfreak Sound System and in the studio to record tracks, including recording "Micron – Eastenders Rap" (1988). The studio sessions then came to a halt, following with the two touring together. Ron's national recognition elevated when appearing twice on Top of the Pops when Rebel MC's first two singles reached number 3 and number 11 respectively in the national charts.

=== 1993–1996: The Jungle Don ===
The rise of jungle music and Ron's developing DJ career went hand in hand. In 1992 Ron hosted a radio show on Kool FM as part of the A-Team Supreme Team with DJ SL, MC Moose and MC 5ive-0, and guests including DJ Brockie, Grooverider, Kenny Ken, Fabio and Ray Keith. He also hosted radio shows on Weekend Rush FM and Centreforce intermittently. Ron was at many notable jungle events which acted as a platform that boosted his DJing appearances. He then became a resident DJ at various rave organisations such as; Telepathy (1991–1995), Pirate Club (1992–1994), Desert Storm (1993–1995), Sunday Roast (1991–1996), VIP Champagne Bash (1994–1996), and Jungle Fever 1993–1996).

Ron launched a record label, London Some 'Ting Records in 1994, which to date, combined with subsidiary labels formed under the 'LSR' banner, have released close to 100 tracks. In 1994, Ron became musical director for seminal documentary A London Some 'Ting Dis. The documentary explored the growing jungle scene, with interviews of jungle musicians and footage of music events, and was first shown on Channel 4.

In 1994, Ron was selected amongst a group of five other DJs to perform on a tour around four North American states, starting with three shows at the Winter Music Conference in Miami. This was the first time UK DJs had travelled to the United States to share this new genre of music, an opportunity that would extend the audience of "junglists" or jungle music enthusiasts. The following year, DJ Ron was chosen to be the first DJ to play a jungle DJ set on BBC Radio 1. The mix was named "The Circumstances of Jungle Music" and was aired on Pete Tong's Essential Mix show in 1995.

=== 1996–2012: hiatus and creative return ===
In 1996, Ron was signed by a major record label, RCA Records. The signing to RCA would have involved producing a jungle album, however, owing to a life-threatening car accident which required an extended period of convalescence, coupled with starting a family, Ron withdrew from DJing, focussing his attention on recovery and family.

For over a decade, Ron continued to release music under different pseudonyms and different musical genres. These releases included DJ Ron - Quintessence.

Later, after a decade and a half of a hiatus in his musical career, in 2012 Ron studied and achieved a BA Honours in Practical Film Making at the Met Film School University in Ealing Film Studios. He was then employed by Rinse FM to design and birth their fledgling online TV division.

=== 2013–present: musical return ===
In 2015, having been head of TV at Rinse FM for three years and having produced music videos for Rinse FM's musicians, Ron habitually focuses on his independent production company London Something. London Something is currently in collaboration with a number of acts, artists and organisations, working on film and music productions. Since 2015, Ron has also had a Rinse FM show, currently biweekly.

In 2018, Ron appeared at Notting Hill Carnival as part of the announcement of the Chase & Status RTRN II Jungle album. Also in 2018 Mixmag featured Ron's as one of the best Jungle mixes you can hear online. DJ Ron also performed several times on the official Chase & Status RTRN II Jungle 2018 tour.

== Discography ==
=== Albums ===
- Quintessence (Parousia/Sony Music, 1997)

=== Mixes/compilations ===
- Re:Code (Knowledge, 2003)

=== Selected singles/EPs ===
- Crackman The Return (Rough Tone, 1993)
- Mo Musik (Rough Tone, 1994)
- Dangerous/Cannan Land (London Some'ting, 1994)
- Crackman (Last Chapter)/African Chant (London Some'ting, 1995)
- River Nile (Remix)/Jekyll & Hide (Lush Recordings, 1996)
- Benjamin Franklins/Rockers (London Some'ting, 1997)
- Subconscious/Creativity (Pimp, 1997)
- Funked/Live! (London Some'ting, 1998)
- Industrial Dubwise (London Some'ting, 1998)
- Belly (No Frills, 2002)
- African Chant (No Frills, 2003)
- Touch The Sky/Arabian Knights (DNA Recordings, 2003)
