= Sully (music producer) =

British electronic music/jungle DJ and producer

- Born: Jack Stevens
- Origin: Norwich, England
- Genres: Jungle; dubstep; UK garage
- Years active: 2007-present
- Labels: Astrophonica; Second Drop; Keysound; Fabriclive

Jack Stevens, better known by his stage name Sully is a jungle DJ and producer from Norwich, England. He is best known for his contribution to the 2020s increase in jungle music popularity.

== Early life ==
Prior to his electronic music career, Sully worked a nine-to-five job at the UK post office, whilst playing in Leicestershire metal band Niroth. Following the separation of this band, Sully learned to produce electronic music.

== Career ==
Sully established his name in the UK bass music scene in the late 2000s, releasing dubstep and UK garage on several UK labels including Second Drop and Frijsfo Beats. His early releases was characterised by a breakbeat-led approach to garage production. In 2011, he released his debut LP Carrier on Keysound Recordings. The album was noted to span a wide range of tempos and styles, and influences from the footwork genre which was beginning to rise in popularity in the UK.

His follow up album Escape was released in September 2017 on Keysound Recordings. The album expressed a selection of styles including grime and breakbeat infused dubstep.

In 2018, Sully launched his own record label, Uncertain Hour, to publish his own releases on.

Although his early releases were popular within the UK underground scene, he was not able to pursue music full time until the COVID-19 pandemic. Following a significant revival of interest in Jungle at this time, Sully was able to resign from his role at the post office and pursue professional music full-time.

His 2021 single "5ives" received widespread attention and was played out by several DJs for its energy and positive reception on the dancefloor. DJ and production duo Bicep closed their Printworks headline set with the song.

Over the next few years, Sully continued to release music on a wide range of labels including Fracture and Neptune's Astrophonica. He collaborated with a wide range of jungle artists including Tim Reaper, Coco Bryce and Dwarde. The four artists also toured together playing back-to-back in 2023, which included a performance at Boomtown festival. In 2022, he collaborated with Nikki Nair and Fracture by releasing a breakbeat sample pack in support of the homeless charity Shelter.

In 2025, Sully released "Modal Collapse", which was the inaugural release on the newly founded Fabriclive record label run by London club Fabric. The release was widely successful, and reached the UK top 40 peaking at number 39.

== Musical style ==
Sully's earlier dubstep and UK garage releases were noted for an unusual blend of influences including future garage, UK funky and footwork.

Sully has been noted as approaching jungle production in an atypical way. His music is often characterised by pitching and phasing of the drums to use them as a melodic instrument. He was unsure on how this unorthodox approach would be received with his audience.

He predominantly works in Renoise, a digital audio workstation heavily inspired by tracker software. The use of this software allows him to take a more detailed approach to sequencing, and has been popular amongst jungle artists. Sully intentionally keeps a minimal setup, since selling much of his hardware after starting a family, he prefers to work on his music solely on his laptop which allows for greater versatility and freedom in the creative process.

== Discography ==
=== Studio albums ===
- Carrier - 2011, Keysound Recordings
- Escape - 2017, Keysound Recordings

=== Selected singles and extended plays ===
- "Soundboy Don't Push Your Luck" / "368ft High And Rising" - 2018, Foxy Jangle
- Swandive - 2020, Astrophonica
- "5ives" / "Sliding" - 2021, Over/Shadow
- "Model Collapse" / "The Wash" - 2025, Fabriclive
