= Valley of the Shadows =

- 1996 vinyl release label

Single by Origin Unknown
- A-side: "The Touch"
- Released: 1993
- Genre: Darkcore; hardcore jungle
- Length: 4:33
- Label: RAM
- Songwriter(s): Andy C; Ant Miles
- Producer(s): Andy C; Ant Miles

Origin Unknown singles chronology
"The Touch" / "Valley of the Shadows" (1993)	"Truly One" / "Mission Control" (1995)

"Valley of the Shadows" is a song by English drum and bass duo Origin Unknown. Considered to be a highly influential jungle track, it was originally released as the B-side of "The Touch" before its re-release as a standalone single in 1996, both released on RAM Records. "Valley of the Shadows" proved a lot more popular than the A-side, "The Touch", and the single went on to become one of the label's best-selling releases.

== Background ==
Two vocal samples are used extensively throughout the track. The phrase "Felt that I was in this long dark tunnel" was sampled from an episode of the BBC documentary series Q.E.D., first shown in 1988, concerning out-of-body experiences. Most of the drum sounds were sampled from the free CD from the first issues of the magazine Future Music in the UK in February 1993. The track was recorded in four hours, and despite being placed on the B-side as it didn't fit the mould of most breakbeat hardcore tracks at the time, it became one of the biggest-selling and most enduring releases on the label.

== Formats and track listings ==
Vinyl (1993) – "The Touch" / "Valley of the Shadows"
No.	Title	Length
1.	"The Touch"	4:38
2.	"Valley of the Shadows"	4:40

Vinyl (1996)
No.	Title	Length
1.	"Valley of the Shadows" (original mix)	4:33
2.	"Valley of the Shadows" (Awake 96 remix)	6:16

CD (1996)
No.	Title	Length
1.	"Valley of the Shadows" (edit mix)	3:46
2.	"Valley of the Shadows" (original mix)	4:33
3.	"Valley of the Shadows" (Awake 96 remix)	6:16

== Charts ==
Chart (1996)	Peak position
UK Singles (OCC)	60
UK Dance (OCC)	3
