= Exercise (disambiguation) =

Exercise is a disciplined activity that is meant to improve and maintain fitness, health and wellness.

Exercise may also refer to:

- Mental exercise, activity for mental fitness
- Military exercise, a military training activity
- Exercise (mathematics), training unit in mathematics
- Exercise (options), a financial or contracting term
- The Exercise, a 1968 play by Lewis John Carlino
- Exercises (album), 1972 by Nazareth
- Exercises (EP), a 2012 EP by CFCF
- Exercise (Bluey), an episode of the Australian animated television series Bluey

== See also ==
- Workout (disambiguation)
