= Jumpin Jack Frost =

- Also known as: Leviticus
- Born: Nigel Thompson; 29 May 1967 (age 59)
- Origin: Brixton, London, England
- Genres: Jungle, drum and bass
- Occupations: DJ, record producer
- Years active: 1989–present
- Labels: V Recordings, Philly Blunt, Formation
- Website: https://jumpinjackfrost.com/

Nigel Thompson (born 29 May 1967), better known as Jumpin Jack Frost, is a British jungle and drum and bass DJ and record producer.

== Biography ==
Frost was born in Brixton, London and, after a troubled youth, started to discover music through local sound system 'dances' and then nights such as Soul II Soul at the Africa Centre. He first started DJing at 18, playing funk and hip hop before the acid house scene arrived and he played at the Carwash nights in the late 1980s with Grooverider, Bryan Gee, and Fabio. As a resident at The Fridge in Brixton, he played alongside Paul 'Trouble' Anderson and Evil Eddie Richards. He also hosted a show on the Brixton-based pirate radio station Passion FM which later became Lightning FM. From here, he would DJ at all the large raves up and down the country including Dreamscape, Telepathy, The Edge, and One Nation.

His friendship with Bryan Gee would lead to both forming the celebrated drum and bass label V Recordings in 1993, and signing artists such as Roni Size, DJ Die, and Krust. In 1994, Frost would produce one of the jungle scenes most seminal anthems in Burial, under the alias of Leviticus, released on the V Recordings sub-label Philly Blunt. The track was later picked up by FFRR and upon its wider release in March 1995, debuted at No. 6 in the UK Dance Single Chart and peaked at No. 66 in the UK Singles Chart.

During this time, Frost would also host a show on Kiss 100 which continued until 2001. He would plays some regular guest slots on Centreforce around 2007-2009. Frost returned to radio in 2012 co-hosting the drum and bass show on Mi-Soul alongside DJ Bailey. Frost now hosts the Jungle show on Mi - Soul Radio.

Through writing his autobiography 'Big Bad and Heavy' published in 2017, Frost has in the last few years increasingly spoken up about mental health issues.

His creativity doesn’t end there as his Black Sheep Clothing brand launched in 2024 and is regularly spotted on artists and fans alike around the world.

Decades on with a sober zest for life like never before, 2026 has been a big year for Frost. Its celebrated the 30th anniversary of ‘Burial’ via re release on Def Jam/ 0207 and a brilliant accompanying documentary about the impact of the iconic record on UK Culture and Frost’s career. It premiered at a star studded screening at Ritzy cinema in Brixton inc Q&A with DJ Target, Frost and director Myles Whittingham. The documentary includes interviews with his lifetime peers inc Goldie, Todd Terry and Jazzie B, among many others and also had an LA premier in July. The release included remixes by Bladerunner, Todd Terry and Supa D and Maestro, with more in the works for next year.

Back in the studio Frost has dropped some huge remixes inc Masicka’s ‘Whites’ and Koffee’s ‘OVA’ to add to his remix catalogue alongside Jamiroquai, Busy Signal, Drizabone, Yung Bredda etc. Other 2026 highlights include performances at Rampage and Disya Generation sound systems at Notting Hill Carnival.

He’s also enjoyed the launch of Planet V’s ‘Legacy’ program, providing skills and coaching to the new generation of drum and bass entrepreneurs and creating the new V Legacy family - proving community is still very much at the heart of everything Frost does - you can take the boy out of Brixton but you can’t take Brixton out of the boy!

To round the year up, aside from the endless DJ commitments worldwide and continuing the ‘Burial’ promotional journey, Frost is busy writing new music and preparing for the 2027 launch of his new project - ‘Frost and Friends’ portfolio. Watch this space !

== Discography ==
=== Singles & EPs ===
- Jumping Jack Frost EP (F Project, 1993)
- Underworld (Osmosis/Pornography) EP (Formation Records, 1994)
- Burial (as Leviticus) (Philly Blunt//FFRR, 1994)
- Jumpin Jack Frost - Burial (0207/DefJAM, 2026)

=== Mix compilations ===
- DJ Randall & Jumping Jack Frost - MixMag Live 15 (MixMag, 1994)
- Big, Bad and Heavy Part Three (Chronic, 2012)
