= Suburban Base =

British record label

- Founded: 1990
- Founder: Danny Donnelly
- Genre: Breakbeat hardcore; jungle; drum and bass
- Country of origin: United Kingdom
- Official website: suburbanbaserecords.com

Suburban Base Records is a British breakbeat hardcore, rave and jungle/drum and bass record label. It is based in Romford, Havering, England. It was established by Danny Donnelly and operated in the UK from 1990 to 1997 and in the United States from 1994 to 1997, however, started to release again in 2014.

== History ==
Danny Donnelly opened a record store in his native Romford, Essex. Named Boogie Times, the store specialised in dance music as well as producing its own self-made white label records. Donnelly's first release was a track called "Hypersonic" which he made with André Jacobs, the owner of Essex-based D-Zone Records. These Boogie Times white labels were well received by customers, as well as DJs from the nearby capital London, which enhanced the store's reputation. In the wake of this success, Donnelly was able to fund a nascent label entitled Suburban Base.

The fledgling label's first release was Kromozone's "The Rush", released in April 1991. This was followed by six further releases later in the year from artists Austin, M&M, Rachel Wallace, Run Tings, Phuture Assassins and QBass. 1992 saw the label's first Top 40 success in the UK Singles Chart - Sonz of a Loop Da Loop Eras' "Far Out" - a piano-led breakbeat track which reached number 36 in February. As music heard at raves filtered into the mainstream, the label was to end the year with twelve UK Singles Chart hits, and experienced the highest-charted debut from an independent record company since the charts began with Smart E's "Sesame's Treet". The track, which sampled heavily from the US children's TV show Sesame Street, reached number two in the UK Singles Chart in July of that year.

As the rave scene began to mutate into two contrasting scenes, 4/4 helium-vocal-characterised happy hardcore and darker, more bass-led darkcore (which itself mutated in jungle/drum and bass), the Suburban Base label found itself drawn to the latter. Such releases as DJ Hype's "Weird Energy" and "Shot In The Dark" and Boogie Times Tribe's "The Dark Stranger" (all 1993) maintained the label's high standing within the scene, which continued as jungle broke through into the mainstream in 1994. Tracks from this period were showcased on the two The Joint compilation releases; a joint collaboration with fellow leading record label Moving Shadow.

That year, Donnelly launched Breakdown Records, a compilation-only subsidiary with which he and others devised and compiled an entire range of albums covering all genres of dance. The most successful of these were the 'Drum & Bass Selection' series, compiled with the help of Danny Breaks and DJ Ash, which sold in excess of 300,000 copies and were the first TV-advertised jungle compilations.

The label's successes allowed it to expand its horizons, setting up a US subsidiary, Sub Base USA, and opening an office in Los Angeles, as well as securing a distribution deal for North America. Further label deals for South America and Japan soon followed.

Towards the end of 1997, however, Donnelly took the decision to close Suburban Base down. This was to allow him to pursue other new challenges in business, and he felt it would be a great injustice to continue running Suburban Base without his full attention. In particular, with the emergence of the speed garage music scene, a genre that derived many elements from jungle and which saw many jungle/drum and bass fans and club-goers defect to this new scene, Donnelly had created a specific sub-label, Quench, for speed garage releases.

In 2014, the label returned initially with a compilation, and then in 2021 started to release previously unreleased material and re-issues.

== Compilations ==
Suburban Base regularly showcased its catalogue throughout its brief history. These compilations include:

- Sub Base For Your Face LP (1992)
- The Joint LP (1993) (collaboration with Moving Shadow)
- The Joint II (1994) (collaboration with Moving Shadow)
- A History Of Hardcore (1995) (collaboration with Moving Shadow)
- Subbase Sampler (1996)
- Classic Subbase (1997)
- Suburban Base Records (The History of Hardcore, Jungle, Drum & Bass 1991-1997) (2014 via New State Music)

== See also ==
- List of record labels
