= Jungle music =

Genre of electronic music

Jungle
- Stylistic origins: Breakbeat hardcore; reggae; dub; dancehall; hip-hop; funk
- Cultural origins: Early 1990s, United Kingdom
- Derivative forms: Drum and bass; breakcore; dubstep; grime; UK garage

Jungle is a genre of electronic music that developed in the 1990s out of the UK rave scene and Jamaican sound system culture. Emerging from breakbeat hardcore, the style is characterised by rapid breakbeats, heavily syncopated percussive loops, samples and synthesised effects, combined with the deep basslines, melodies and vocal samples found in dub, reggae and dancehall, as well as hip-hop and funk. Many producers frequently sampled the "Amen break" or other breakbeats from funk and jazz recordings. Jungle was a direct precursor to the drum and bass genre which emerged in the mid-1990s.

== Origins ==
The breakbeat hardcore scene of the early 1990s was beginning to fragment by 1992 and 1993, with different influences becoming less common together in tracks. The piano and uplifting vocal style that was prevalent in breakbeat hardcore started to lay down the foundations of 4-beat/happy hardcore, whilst tracks with dark-themed samples and industrial-style stabs had emerged from late 1992 and named darkcore. Reggae samples and reggae-influenced tracks had been a feature of many breakbeat hardcore tracks since 1990, particularly from producers such as Shut Up and Dance; (Note: "They didn't know what they were going to label this type of music. They didn't care. They were specialising in heavy reggae with breakbeats.") however, Paul Ibiza (Note: At Ibiza Records, Paul was tired of foreign sounds running the British dance scene. That's when Ibiza Records started. Paul fused the bleeps and breaks with reggae b-lines. The sound elements worked. The reggae influence worked.) and the Rebel MC were arguably the first to bring the sound system influence solidly into releases. The track "We Are I.E." by Lennie De Ice is often credited as being the track that laid down the foundations for jungle with its ragga bassline.

During 1992 and 1993, the terms "jungle techno" and "hardcore jungle" proliferated to describe that shift of the music from breakbeat hardcore to jungle. The sound was championed at clubs such as AWOL, Roast and Telepathy, by DJs such as DJ Ron, DJ Hype, DJ Randall, Fabio & Grooverider, Micky Finn, DJ Rap and Kenny Ken, record labels Moving Shadow, V Recordings, Suburban Base and Renk, and on pirate radio stations such as Kool FM (regarded as being the most instrumental station in the development of jungle) but also Don FM, Rush and Rude FM.

Tracks would span breakbeat styles, with notable releases including "Darkage" by DJ Solo, "Valley of the Shadows" by Origin Unknown, "Set Me Free" by Potential Bad Boy, "28 Gun Bad Boy" by A Guy Called Gerald, "Crackman" by DJ Ron, "A London Sumtin" by Code 071, "Finest Illusion" by Foul Play, "Learning from My Brother" by Family of Intelligence, "Lion of Judah" by X Project, and "Be Free" by Noise Factory.

Techniques and styles could be traced to such a vast group of influencers, each adding their own little elements. According to Simon Reynolds, jungle was "Britain's very own equivalent to US hip-hop. That said, you could equally make the case that jungle is a raved-up, digitised offshoot of Jamaican reggae. Musically, jungle's spatialised production, bass quake pressure and battery of extreme sonic effects, make it a sort of postmodern dub music on steroids." This is an example of the effects of the sonic diaspora and the wide influence musical genres have; Jungle is where these different Black Atlantic genres converge. Reynolds noted the audience of the genre evolved alongside the music itself; going from a "sweaty, shirtless white teenager, grinning and gurning" to a "head nodding, stylishly dressed black twenty-something with hooded eyes, holding a spliff in one hand and a bottle of champagne in the other". Jungle also served as "a site for a battle between contesting notions of blackness".

== Rise and popularity ==
All Junglists, seminal 1994 Channel 4 documentary

Jungle reached the peak of its popularity between 1994 and 1995. At this stage, the genre was achieving a number of UK top 40 hits, including "Incredible" by M-Beat featuring General Levy, and spawned a series of CD compilations such as Jungle Mania and Jungle Hits. Controversy raged over the success of "Incredible" when Levy reportedly made comments in the media that he was "running jungle at the moment". Although Levy always argued that his comments were misinterpreted, this did not fail to stop a boycott of the single amongst a group of DJs that were dubbed as the "Jungle Committee". Labels such as Ibiza, 3rd Party and Kemet were prolific in their releases.

Having previously been confined to pirate radio, legal stations woke up to jungle from 1994. London's Kiss 100 launched its Givin' It Up show in early 1994 and featured DJs on rotation including Kenny Ken, Jumpin Jack Frost, Fabio, Grooverider, LTJ Bukem, DJ Randall, DJ Rap and Mickey Finn. A year later, the UK's nationwide broadcaster BBC Radio 1 finally gave jungle a platform on its One in the Jungle weekly show.

Major labels such as Sony and BMG were signing deals with artists including A Guy Called Gerald, Kemet and DJ Ron. Of these, Roni Size and 4hero would achieve wider commercial success as drum and bass artists, but continued to release more underground jungle tracks—the latter adopting the alias Tom & Jerry to continue to release rare groove sampling dancefloor-oriented jungle. The underground classic "Burial" by Leviticus would see a major release on FFRR Records.

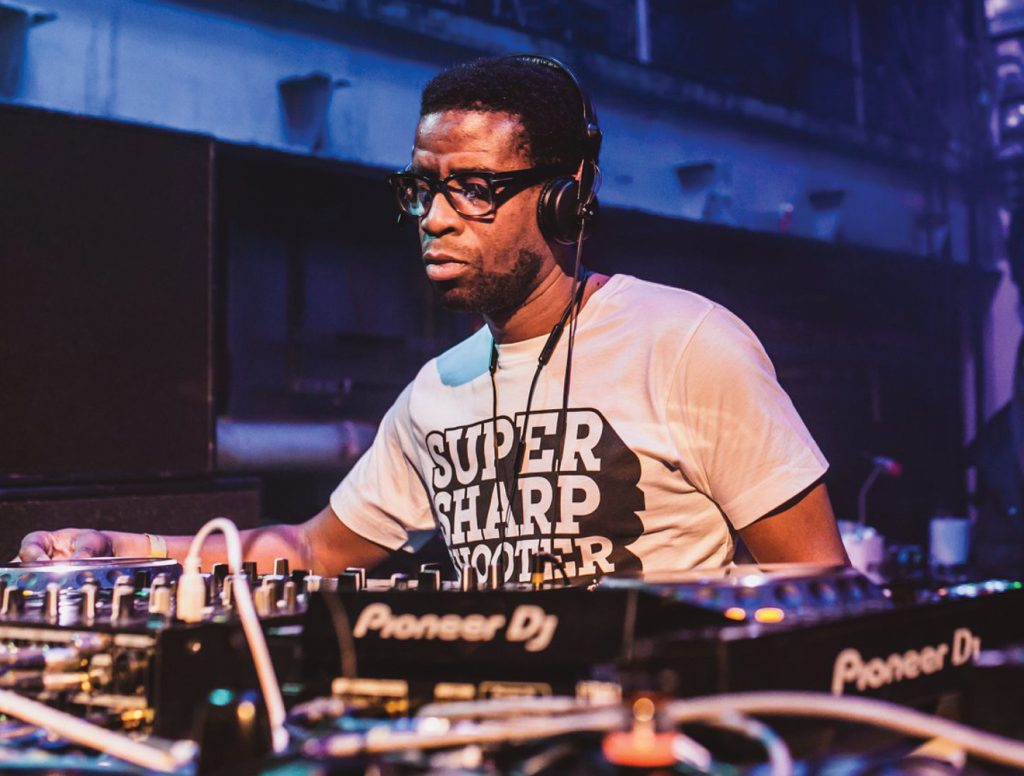
DJ Ron playing in 2018 for Chase & Status

Jungle music, as a scene, was unable to decide whether it wanted to be recognised in the mainstream or if it wanted to avoid misrepresentation. This manifested in the cooperation of jungle artists and small record labels. Small record labels worked to provide more autonomy to the music artists in return for their business and jungle music was proliferated by pirate stations in underground networks and clubs. Whilst the media would in part feed off jungle music success, it also perpetuated negative stereotypes about the scene as being violent. The seminal 1994 documentary A London Some 'Ting Dis, chronicled the growing jungle scene and interviewed producers, DJs and ravers to counter this perception.

1996 and 1997 saw a less reggae-influenced sound and a darker, grittier and more sinister soundscape. Hip-hop and jazz-influenced tracks dominated the clubs in this period. Dillinja, Roni Size, Die, Hype, Zinc, Alex Reece and Krust were instrumental in the transition of the jungle sound to drum and bass. By the end of 1998, the genre's sound had changed forms significantly from the sound heard earlier in the decade.

=== Popular subgenres ===
==== Ragga jungle ====
Ragga jungle is a fusion genre that combines jungle with a heavy reggae influence. It would become a major subgenre during 1994 and 1995, with popular tracks such as "Incredible" by M-Beat featuring General Levy, "Original Nuttah" by UK Apachi and Shy FX, "Sound Murderer / RIP" by Remarc, "Limb by Limb" by Hitman featuring Cutty Ranks, and "Code Red / Champion DJ" by Conquering Lion.

==== Jump-up ====
In 1995, jump-up would also become a popular subgenre that came out of hardstep, with influences of various kinds of sound experiments, most importantly the bass line. Popular tracks of this subgenre include "Dred Bass" by Dead Dred, "Super Sharp Shooter" by DJ Zinc, "This Style" by Shy FX, "R.I.P" (DJ Hype Remix) by Remarc and DJ Zinc's remix of the Fugees' "Ready or Not". The genre would later regain popularity in the early 2000s with new productions by artists such as Shimon & Andy C, Bad Company, DJ Hazard and Pendulum.

==== Ambient jungle ====
Also known as atmospheric drum and bass, intelligent jungle and intelligent drum and bass, ambient jungle is categorized by a stronger emphasis on atmospheric, melodic elements than complex, re-sequenced breakbeats. Ambient jungle evolved out of the breakbeat hardcore scene in the early 1990s in contrast to darkside. Hardcore's influence on ambient jungle can be heard in the B-side of Dieselboy's 1994 mixtape, Future Sound of Hardcore. LTJ Bukem is generally considered the originator of this genre and his label Good Looking Records put out many of its most celebrated releases in the 1990s. Iconic artists in this subgenre include LTJ Bukem, Foul Play, Wax Doctor, Peshay, Blu Mar Ten and Omni Trio.

== Sociocultural context ==
The post-Thatcherite United Kingdom of the early 1990s had left many young people, particularly London's lower-class urban youth, disenfranchised and disillusioned with a seemingly crumbling societal structure. Jungle reflected these feelings, as it was a notably more dark, less euphoric style of music than many of the other styles popular at raves. The music was much more popular with black British youths than other rave styles, such as techno, even though it was heavily influenced by these other rave styles, including those from the United States.

Jungle music was also seen as "England's answer to hip-hop", aimed at breaking down racial boundaries and promoting unification through its multiculturalism by drawing from different cultures and attracting mixed crowds at raves. Jungle's rhythm-as-melody style overturned the dominance of melody-over-rhythm in the hierarchy of Western music, adding to its radical nature.

Moreover, the greater accessibility to sampling technology allowed young people to create music in their homes by incorporating their own sampling and experiences, rather than needing a grand recording studio.

Characterised by the breakbeats and multi-tiered rhythms, Jungle drew support not only from British b-boys who got swept up into the rave scene, but also from reggae, dancehall, electro and rap fans alike. Simon Reynolds described it as causing fear and "for many ravers, too funky to dance" yet the club scene enjoyed every second.

== Etymology ==
The origin of the word jungle is one of discussion. Rebel MC is often noted for having popularised the term, and in Simon Reynolds' book Energy Flash, MC Navigator is quoted as attributing the word to him. (Note: "According to MC Navigator from Kool FM, 'jungle' comes from 'junglist', and was first heard in 1991 as a sample used by Rebel MC. "Rebel got this chant—all the junglists—from a yard-tape" referring to the sound-system mix-tapes imported from Jamaica. "When Rebel sampled that, the people cottoned on, and soon they started to call the music jungle.") Others such as MC Five-O attribute it to MC Moose, (Note: "Moose was the first person I heard using the word 'jungle'. It just came to us. Original hardcore jungle. Like you was in Africa. Like something tribal. It just came.") whilst Rob Playford (of Moving Shadow) attributes it to MC Mad P (of Top Buzz). (Note: "He said it was 'hardcore-jungle-techno'. It was known for that for several months... just dropping of all the other words. We'd had hardcore and techno... but this was 'jungle'.")

Some thought of this term as empowering, an assertion of the blackness of the music and its subculture, inverting the racist history of the term "jungle music".

== Notable releases ==
Notable releases include: "Burial" by Leviticus, "Dangerous" by DJ Ron, "Lover to Lover / Maximum Style" by Tom & Jerry, "Original Nuttah" by Shy FX, "All the Crew Big Up" by Roni Size & DJ Die, "Incredible / Sweet Love" by M-Beat, "The Helicopter Tune" by Deep Blue, "Super Sharp Shooter" by DJ Zinc, "Sovereign Melody / Lion Heart" by Dillinja, "Everyman" by Kenny Ken, "The Victory / Lovable" by DJ Dextrous, "Calling All The People" by Aphrodite, "The Lighter" by DJ SS and "Tiger Style" by DJ Hype.

== Crossover with drum and bass ==
The term "jungle" is often used as a synonym for drum and bass, particularly in the United States. More commonly, jungle is viewed as the originating point for drum and bass, with the progressive changes brought by artists in the late 1990s serving as the point of diversion (some examples being Trace & Ed Rush, LTJ Bukem, Photek, Total Science, Goldie and Optical). During this time, a false dichotomy was established between drum and bass and jungle, with the former for white ravers and the latter for black ravers. The sub-genre of drum and bass developed to be quicker, more industrial, less danceable yet was seen as more 'accessible and commercial' than jungle, as cited in an article by The Observer in 1996.

In Black Music in Britain in the 21st Century, written by Julia Toppin in 2023, she explains, "the process of modifying jungle's name can be viewed as an 'act of resignifying the otherness' to disassociate it from black people and the racist media narratives containing race, drugs, and violence with jungle music and the scene." The jungle scene had always been portrayed in a negative light due to its affiliation with the rave scene and especially because of the black people associated with the music.

The security and drug incidents at jungle events typically seemed to attract more police attention than other EDM genres, though the same trouble would happen in any other raves attended by predominately white audiences. With the emergence of drum and bass, the previous biases against jungle intensified while drum and bass's popularity grew rapidly in mainstream media. In her article, Toppin highlights the sonic marginalization that occurred during the late 1990s, with black jungle ravers declined entry at night clubs and DJs being shadow-banned from playing jungle at venues. This would lead to jungle's return to the underground at the end of the decade.

== Re-emergent jungle scene ==
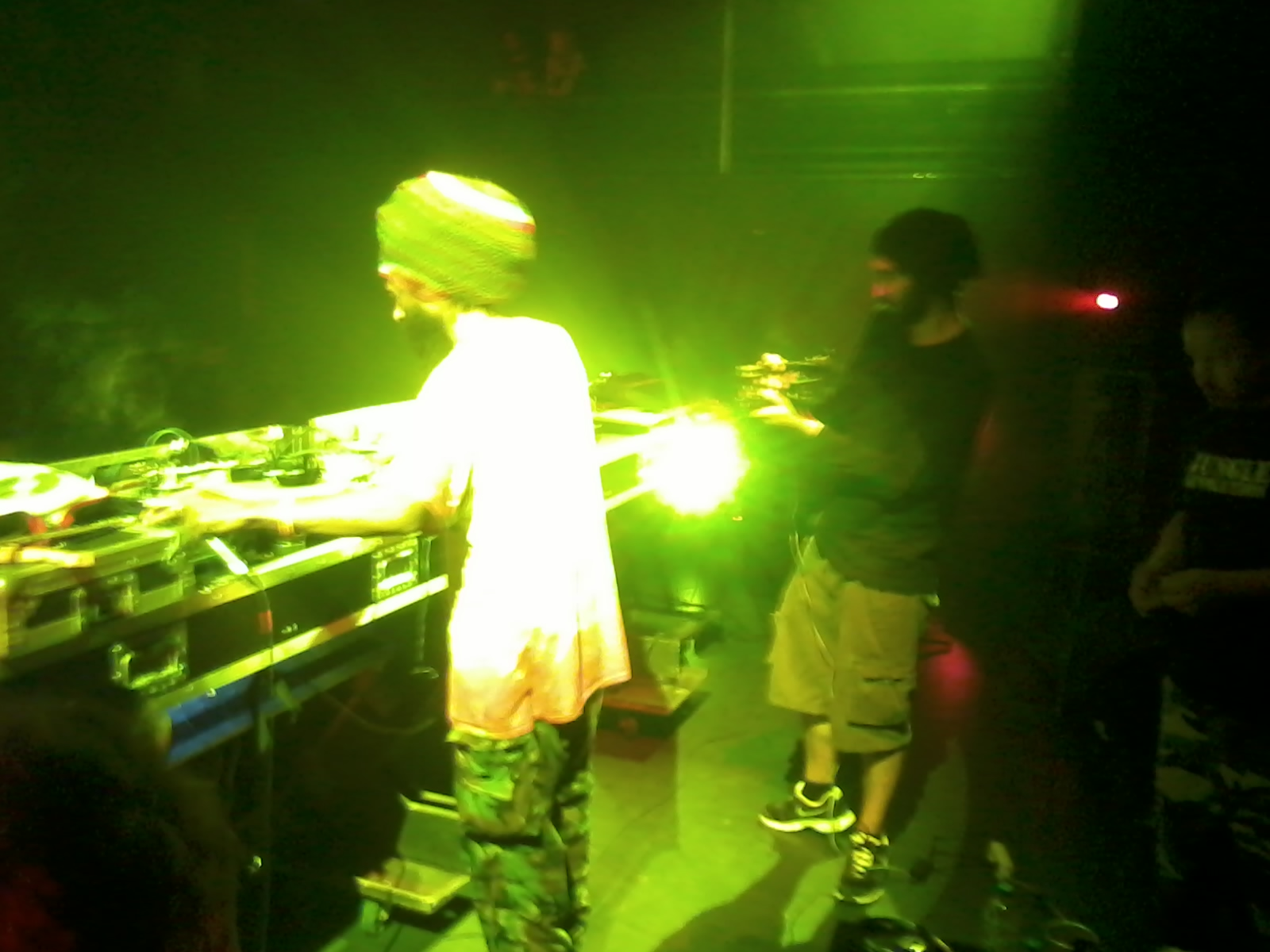
Congo Natty, Jungle Revolution album tour, 2013

An underground movement producing tracks in the style of the 1990s and some original (though mostly mainstream drum and bass) have taken notes of this renewed interest in the original sound. Shy FX, for example, launched the Digital Soundboy label in 2005 to release more jungle music. The UK continues to have an active jungle scene, with regular jungle nights at the Corsica Studios contributing to the genres continued popularity. The scene has grown with new producers such as Forest Drive West, Tim Reaper, Dead Man's Chest and Sully.

The early to mid-2000s saw a jungle revival in the emerging drum-funk subgenre, with labels such as Scientific Wax, Bassbin Records and Paradox Music pushing for a more breaks orientated sound. Technicality and Bassbin events in London were spearheading this return to more traditional elements of jungle music.

One of the scene's originators, Congo Natty, continued to release jungle music throughout the 2000s, culminating in the 2013 album Jungle Revolution.

In 2018, Chase & Status produced an album exploring jungle sounds, RTRN II JUNGLE.

In the 2020s, prevalent jungle record labels include Future Retro London, 3AM Eternal, Deep Jungle, and Hardcore Energy.
