= Dillinja =

- Also known as: Basic Influence; Capone; Cybotron; Trinity; D-Type; Suburban Knights; The Specialist
- Born: Karl Nicholas Francis
- Origin: Brixton, London
- Genres: Drum and bass, jungle
- Occupations: DJ, record producer
- Years active: 1991–present
- Labels: Metalheadz, V Recordings, Valve Recordings, Chronic, Hard Leaders, FFRR
- Website: www.dillinja.co.uk

Karl Nicholas Francis, also known as Dillinja, is a British jungle/drum and bass DJ and record producer.

== Biography ==
Dillinja is a prolific producer and artist within the jungle and drum and bass scene. Since 1991, Dillinja has produced a number of tracks under both that and other aliases such as Suburban Knight, Cybotron, Trinity, Capone, Basic Influence, and The Specialist.

He set up his sound system and record label Valve Recordings with long-time producing partner Lemon D in 2001 and it made its debut at Fabric nightclub in London, and subsequently travelled across the UK and Worldwide.

With the re-release of his track Twist Em Out (featuring MC Skibadee) he reached number 35 in the UK Singles Chart in June 2003.

== Discography ==
=== Albums ===
- Cybotron (as Cybotron) (Valve Recordings/FFRR, 2001)
- Big Bad Bass (with Lemon D) (Valve Recordings, 2002)

=== Mixes/compilations ===
- My Sound (1993-2004) (Valve Recordings, 2004)
- Spectrum (with Lemon D) (Valve Recordings, 2004)

=== Selected singles/EPs ===
- Dillinja EP (Tough Toonz, 1993)
- Sinewave (as Cybotron) (Cybotron, 1993)
- From Beyond/Ride It Hard (as Cybotron) (Cybotron, 1993)
- Steal The Way/Forever Fierce (as Cybotron) (Cybotron, 1993)
- Lock Me Out/Dark Influence (as Capone) (Cybotron, 1993)
- Test 2 EP (Wave Form, 1994)
- 3:01 in the Morning/Catch The Vibe (with Mr E) (IQ Records, 1994)
- Chapter 19 & 20 EP (as Trinity) (V Recordings, 1994)
- Deadly Ceremonies/Sovereign Melody (Deadly Vinyl, 1994)
- Deadly Deep Subs/Calculus Beats (Deadly Vinyl, 1994)
- Deep Love (Remix)/Moods (Logic Productions, 1994)
- In My Soul/South Side Riffin/Stompers Delight (Dillinja, 1994)
- Lion Heart/Art of Control (with Berty B) (Lionheart, 1994)
- Majestic B-Line EP (Deadly Vinyl, 1994)
- Steelers Anthem/Sax into The Night (IQ Records, 1994)
- You Don't Know (The Remix)/Heavenly Bass (Logic Productions, 1994)
- As It Grooves/State of Art (as Suburban Knights) (IMC, 1994)
- Gangsta/I Selassie I (as Trinity) (Philly Blunt, 1995)
- Soldier/Massive (as Capone) (Hard Leaders, 1995)
- Tear Down (Da Whole Place)/Believe the Bass (Conqueror Records, 1995)
- The Angels Fell EP (Metalheadz, 1995)
- Jah VIP/Deadly Deep Subs (Remixes) (Razors Edge, 1995)
- Paradise/Voice (as Capone) (Hard Leaders, 1996)
- Still Waters/Rainforest (as Basic Influence) (Hard Leaders, 1996)
- Twisted Amen/Garbage DJ (as The Specialist) (Dread Recordings, 1996)
- Deep And Rolling/Drop It On the One (as The Specialist) (Dread Recordings, 1996)
- Friday/Alaska (as Capone) (Hard Leaders, 1997)
- Tronik Funk/Thugs (Test Recordings, 1998)
- Dillinja/Lemon D Doublepack EP (with Lemon D) (Valve Recordings, 2001)
- The Grimey EP (V Recordings, 2002)
- Twist Em Out/Remixes (Trouble On Vinyl, 2003)
- Fast Car/No Future (Valve Recordings, 2003)
- This Is A Warning/Super DJ (Valve Recordings, 2003)
- All The Things/Forsaken Dreams (Valve Recordings, 2004)
- In The Grind/Acid Trak (Lemon D Remix) (Valve Recordings, 2004)
- Thugged Out Bitch (Adam F & DJ Fresh Remix)/Rainforest (Valve Recordings, 2004)
- Feel My Pain/In The Grind VIP (Valve Recordings, 2005)
- The Dillinja EP (Valve Recordings, 2006)
- Diggin' In Ya Crates EP (Valve Recordings, 2007)
- Grimey (Clipz Remix)/Sky (Zero T Remix) (V Recordings, 2008)
- Soul Control/Unexplored Terrain (V Recordings, 2008)
