= Tape.tv =

Defunct music video streaming provider

tape.tv
- Available in: German
- Dissolved: November 2016
- Headquarters: Berlin, Germany
- Owner: tape.tv
- Website: www.tape.tv
- Launched: 1 July 2008

tape.tv was a music video streaming provider based in Berlin, Germany. The company was co-founded in 2008 by Conrad Fritzsch and Stephanie Renner. tape.tv gained popularity from music videos being inaccessible in Germany as a result of YouTube having a dispute with GEMA, Germany's performing rights society, and hosted upwards of 45,000 music videos from major German labels and a collection of indie labels. The reach of the site was around 3.9 million unique users with an average dwell-time of around 25 minutes. tape.tv was free to the user and was financed through advertisement, which the company labeled as "entertainment advertising".

The company went bankrupt in November 2016 due to their service becoming obsolete as a result of YouTube solving the dispute with the GEMA.

== Programme ==
tape.tv was personalised internet music television that users could modify according to their taste. tape.tv took pride in allowing the user to either control the stream or to just tune in and watch like a TV channel. The programme was shaped by an editorial department, but users were able to personalise the content by using any of the several functions, such as a "more like this" button. They could also switch to genre-channels, such as Alternative rock, Hip hop music, Pop music, Rock music, Indie rock, Electro, Soul music, R&B and Heavy metal music. When the user liked or disliked a music video, tape.tv stored the preferences and modified the programme accordingly.

tape.tv also offered a search and a mixtape function. These mixtapes were individual playlists that could be sent via email or shared via social media.

For its programme tape.tv had full access to music videos from the four major labels Universal Music, Sony Music, EMI and Warner Music, as well as independent labels such as Finetunes, Kontor New Media, Rough Trade and Zebralution. tape.tv was available in Germany, Switzerland and Austria.

== Productions ==
tape.tv has produced its own formats since the summer of 2010. The first one was the live-acoustic format called "auf den dächern" which translates to "on the rooftops." In October 2011, tape.tv celebrated its 100th production of this format with Florence and the Machine. Many of these concerts were available on iTunes.

In May 2011, tape.tv started its first live show called "on tape." The project was a cooperation with the German TV station ZDFkultur; users were able to get into contact with the host of the show and the artists via webcam, call-in, and Facebook chat. In December 2011, tape.tv reached an audience of more than 50,000 live viewers for the first time with German rapper Kool Savas.

Starting in May 2011, tape.tv also began airing a show with live concerts called "tape.live."

== Video-premieres ==
tape.tv often had rights to the nationwide video premieres for famous international artists, such as Depeche Mode, Lady Gaga, Red Hot Chili Peppers, etc.

== Blog ==
Aside from setting up the rotation and programme guide for tape.tv, the editorial department also ran a music blog, which featured news from artists and offered a helpful overview of the programme.

== History ==
In July 2008, tape.tv started under the web address http://tape.tv. The company was founded by Conrad Fritzsch and Stephanie Renner, who functioned as management of the company at the same time. 19 January 2010 saw the relaunch of the tape.tv platform, offering the users options to personalise the programme. In 2011, the company expanded from 35 employees to 85 employees.

In May 2012 tape.tv raised €5 million from investors. Participants in the funding round were Atlantic Capital Partners GmbH (through its currently managed fund), Dario Suter, Christoph Daniel und Marc Schmidheiny (DCM), Christophe Maire as well as Investitionsbank Berlin (IBB) VC Fonds Kreativwirtschaft Berlin, managed by IBB Beteiligungsgesellschaft.

The company was downsized to 20 employees in October 2014. and finally discontinued in November 2016.

== Business model ==
Tuning in to tape.tv was free of charge. The business model rested on advertisement and media-cooperations.

== Advertisement ==
tape.tv was mainly financed through advertisement. In order to keep the programme free from interruptions, tape.tv had developed the 360°motionAd. The 360°motionAd was a dynamic Flash animation around the tape.tv-player. The latest ad innovation utilised by tape.tv was the so-called FlipAd; the player flipped back and the free space was used to promote the product message. With the FlipAd tape.tv offers an ad-format suitable for smartphones and tablets.

== Cooperations ==
tape.tv cooperated with several partners offline and online. Some of these partners were bild.de, Yahoo!, Facebook, Spotify, ZDF.kultur, 3Sat, Spex and Radio Fritz.

== Technology ==
tape.tv was streamed via web browsers and smartphone apps. In order to receive tape.tv the user had to own broadband internet access, as well as a current version of Flash.

== Awards ==
=== 2009 ===
Webby Awards: "Honoree Music" tape.tv featured in the top 10 of the best web music pages Winner "Honorees Interactive Advertising" for the 360°MotionAd German Multimedia Award (DMMA) for the 360° MotionAd.

=== 2010 ===
LEAD Award: Category "WebTV of the year"

=== 2011 ===
Gründerszene (founders' scene): Startup of the decade / Category: newcomer Association of Independent Musicians: Best Music Platform Techcrunch "The Europas": Nominated as Best Entertainment, Music, Video
