= Nicky Blackmarket =

- Also known as: Nick OD
- Born: Nicholas Andersson-Gylden; December 1967
- Genres: Breakbeat hardcore, jungle, drum and bass
- Occupations: Producer, DJ

Nicky Blackmarket (born Nicholas Andersson-Gylden) is a British drum and bass DJ and record producer. He is of Indian Nepali, Irish and Swedish ancestry. Blackmarket is regarded as one of the pivotal figures in the early jungle/drum and bass scene. He has played drum and bass all over the world since the 1980s.

== Career ==
Blackmarket started DJing in the 1980s when he was 14 and initially played electro before moving on to play all different types of dance music in house parties and on various pirate radio stations, including Pulse FM and Eruption FM, in London.

He is also famous for being part-owner of independent dance music record store Blackmarket Records in Soho, Central London (now known as BM-Soho). In the early 1990s, he created a department within the store for the breakbeat scene which would evolve into drum and bass.

Blackmarket has sporadically produced tunes ("Spam EP" as Nick OD), however his main focus has been on playing tunes as a DJ all over the UK and the world.

Blackmarket is also a fan of West London EFL team QPR.
