= Marcus Intalex =

English disc jockey and musician (1971–2017)

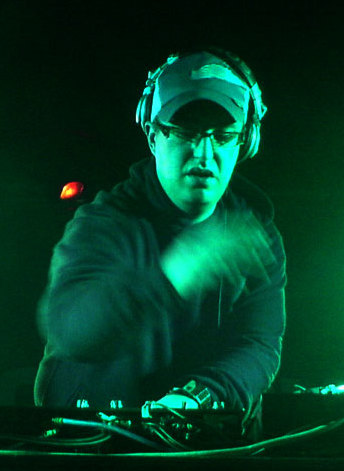
- Marcus Intalex in 2006
- Born: Marcus Julian Kaye; 14 July 1971
- Died: 28 May 2017 (aged 45); Manchester, England
- Occupations: DJ; record producer
- Years active: 1991–2017
- Musical career
- Also known as: Trevino
- Genres: Drum and bass; house; techno
- Labels: Soul:R; Revolve:R; Birdie

Marcus Julian Kaye (14 July 1971 – 28 May 2017), better known by his stage name Marcus Intalex, was an English drum and bass producer, DJ and musician. He additionally made house and techno music under the pseudonym Trevino. Between 1993 and 2000 he co-hosted the drum-and-bass radio show Da Intalex on Kiss 102 FM in Manchester. Kaye was the founder of the Soul:R, Revolve:R, and Birdie recording labels, and was active as a DJ, record producer, and touring artist from 1991 until his death in May 2017. His albums included the 2007 release FabricLive.35 and the 2011 release 21.

== Early life ==
Marcus Kaye grew up in Burnley, Lancashire, England.

== Career ==
Kaye began as a House DJ in 1991 under the name Marcus Intalex, before becoming known as an early adopter of the UK Drum and Bass sound in the city of Manchester. In 1993, Kaye and fellow DJ Mark XTC started the Drum and Bass radio show Da Intalex on Kiss 102 FM in Manchester, which they co-hosted until 2000. Kaye was called a "pioneer" of the movement by the Manchester Evening News, and also played a part in the development of the "Intelligent Drum and Bass" scene. As a DJ, Kaye toured globally. He was also one of the first artists on the Hospital Records music label, as well as the founder of the recording label Soul:R, which he managed. He was also a cofounder of the label Revolve:r.

Kaye eventually began DJing House and Techno music again and touring under the new pseudonym of Trevino, after his favourite golfer Lee Trevino. In this spirit he also named a new House and Techno label for his personal love of golf, naming the label Birdie. In addition to his DJing and recording career, Kaye was the founder, resident DJ, and promoter of the Soul:ution series of Drum and Bass parties at Band on the Wall in Manchester, as well as the weekly "Guidance" series of club nights. In 2013 he became the namesake of the Marcus Intalex scholarship at the Manchester MIDI School.

== Discography ==
Kaye's first single was released in 1994, entitled "What Ya Gonna Do". Later in his career, he released two albums and a podcast under the pseudonym Marcus Intalex. The first album was FabricLive.35 in 2007, a mix compilation through the FabricLive series released by Fabric Nightclub in London. The second album was 21, which he released on his Soul:R label that he ran alongside ST Files (musician), in 2011, named in celebration of the 21st year of his career. In 2016, he released a podcast, RA.EX309 Marcus Intalex under the Resident Advisor label. In addition to his albums and podcast, as of 2014, he had released fifteen LPs under the name Marcus Intalex and ten further under the pseudonym Trevino, the latter focusing on house and techno. Kaye also released tracks with Mark XTC under their collective name "Da Intalex", a moniker taken from the name of their 1990s radio show. He has also released many remixes which include Better Place by 4 Hero (2001), Just A Vision by Solid State (2006), Faceless by Commix (2007) and LK by DJ Marky and XRS (2007).

== Death ==
Kaye died at the age of 45 on 28 May 2017 in Manchester, England.

The Marcus Intalex Music Foundation was established soon after his death to build on his legacy with the aim of the providing "educational workshops & events to give the next generation of talent the tools and space to develop their craft".

A documentary about his life is being produced in 2021 and a mural is due to be painted at Creative Arts in Burnley.
