= Drumagick =

Brazilian DJ and music production duo

- Origin: São Paulo, Brazil
- Genres: Drum and bass, Sambass, Samba
- Label: Sony
- Members: JrDeep; Guilherme Lopes
- Website: www.drumagick.com

Drumagick are the brothers JrDeep (born 1977) and Guilherme Lopes (born 1981). They are DJs and drum 'n' bass producers who live in São Paulo, Brazil.

== History ==
JrDeep and Guilherme Lopes were exposed to the hardcore days back in 1993. JrDeep used to skateboard as a child, but at the age of 12 he got run over by a car and had to stay almost 6 months in recovery from the accident. He started to listen to the radio a lot at that time, when bands such as Information Society, Depeche Mode and New Order were on the billboards. As soon as he recovered from the accident, he took a DJ course and became increasingly interested in electronic music.

Guilherme Lopes started to DJ from the early age of 12, following his elder brother's steps, and at the age of 15 he already produced singles. His musical influences include Brazilian popular music, Ray Conniff, the Beatles, Ed Rush, Optical, DJ Hype, Calibre and Roni Size.

In 1996, they created Drumagick, who have, over the years, witnessed the transformation and development of the jungle and drum'n'bass scene as keenly as the British who invented the sound. Drumagick similarly re-invented the samba, with a twist of heavy bass, dancefloor funk, jazzy tunes and energetic melody. They are also known for DJing together at the same time with two sets of turntables, and more recently, a 5-piece live band has joined the gig.

== Discography ==
- Ai Maluco!, 2000 Album CD, Trama/SambaLoco Records (Brazil)
- Checkmate!, Album CD, release date April 25, 2005, Sony Music/Segundo Mundo (Brazil)
- Dance Box / Dance Remixes (Mixed), Album 2 CDs, 2010, (CDBR006) Beatmasters (Brazil)

=== Singles ===
- Easy Boom / Funquiada – Single 12" vinil – Trama / SambaLoco Records - (UK/Worldwide)
- Gilles Peterson Worldwide 2 - Single 10" – Talkin' Loud - (UK)
- Cambraia / Brasil - Single 12" – Trama / SambaLoco Records – (UK)
- Cidade de Deus Remixes (Soundtrack) – Single 12" vinil – Levine Records (Worldwide)
- Levada Tropical / Tempo Fechado – Single 12" vinil - Phuturo Recordings (San Francisco, USA)
- Malandragem / Malta – Single 12" – Schema Records (Italy)
- Ragga Style / Enquandro – Single 12" vinil – Frontline Records (UK)
- Can U Dig It / Parah – Single 12" vinil – Subtronix Records (New Zealand/Australia)
- Checkmate! / Can U Dig It – Single 12 vinil” vinil – Segundo Mundo Records (UK)
- Club Sessions Mix CD Album By Bryan Gee - Liquid V Records (UK)
- Time To Get Up / Can't Stop – Single 12" vinil - Hard:Edged Records (Germany)
- Mainline / Funk-Dog – Single 12" vinil - Emotif Recordings (UK)
- Ragga Soul / Full House – Single 12” vinyl – Chronic Records (UK)
- In The Mix / Deep Magic – Double Single 12” vinyl – Liquid V Records (UK)

=== Remixes and collaborations ===
- Ramilson Maia – É Música! (Drumagick remix) – Album CD – Trama / SambaLoco Records (Brazil)
- Xrs Land – Redrum (Drumagick Alien Murder remix) – Single 12” Trama / Sambaloco Records (Brazil)
- Mitchel & Dewbury - Beyond The Rains – Single 12" vinil – Jazz FM/Mumo Records (UK)
- Cidade de Deus remixes 2 - Amor De Verão (Drumagick remix) – Single 12” vinyl - Levine Records (Worldwide)
- Leandro Bomfim - Malta (Drumagick Remix) / Ecosystem The Brazilian Joint – Album CD – (New York, USA)
- Mitchell & Dewbury - Beyond the Rains (Drumagick remix) Gilles Peterson In Brazil - Album duplo CD – Ether Records (Inglaterra)
- Ed Eustace – Disciples (Drumagick remix) – 12” vinyl Single – Vinyl Vibes Records (Alemanha)
- Silvério Pessoa – Na Boleia da Toyota (Drumagick remix) – Transformer Records (Brasil)
- Laurent Garnier - The Cloud Making Machine Reworks - First Reaction (Drumagick e DJ Marky remix) – Single 12” vinyl – F Communications (France)

=== Other records ===
- Underground Beat Vol 2 Collective CD – Trombo
- DJ Andy & Drumagick - Copacabana / Get It (Make Me High) – Single 12" vinil / Phuturistic Bluez Records (New York/USA)
- DJ Patife Presents: Sounds Of Drum'n'bass Vol.1 Album CD - "Favela Jazz" – Trama / SambaLoco Records (Brazil)
- DJ Marky: Audio Architecture Album CD – "Aí Maluco" (DJ Marky remix) - SambaLoco Records (Brazil)
- Sambaloco 1 Ano (DJ World magazine CD) "Aí Maluco" – Trama / SambaLoco Records (Brazil)
- Sambaloco Espiritual Drum'n'bass - Album duplo (2 CDs) – "Tiquinho" – Trama/SambaLoco Records (worldwide)
- Gilles Peterson: Worldwide Programme 2 – Double vinyl (2 LPs) – Com a música Easy Boom - Talkin' Loud Records (UK/worldwide)
- City of God Soundtrack Single Vinyl 12” – Amor De Verão (Remix) / A Busca Da Vida - ST2 Records (Brasil)
- Break N' Bossa Chapter 6 – Triple vinyl album (3xLP) – Schema Records (Italy)
- Break n' Bossa Chapter 6 – Double CD (2xCD) – Schema Records (Italy)
- Breakbeat Science Exercise.02 – Album CD – Breakbeat Science Recordings (Chicago/USA)
- Cidade De Deus Remix - Volume 1 – Album CD – ST2 Records (Brazil)
- Cidade De Deus Remix - Volume 2 – Album CD – ST2 Records (Brazil)
- Ecosystem The Brazilian Joint Album CD – REDance Records (USA)
- Latin Club Sessions Double CD (2xCD) – Sessions Records (UK/Worldwide)
- Ramilson Maia Apresenta Drum'n'Bass Brasil Album CD – Mega Music Records (Brazil)
- Sambaloco Brazilian Drum 'N' Bass Classics Album CD – Trama/SambaLoco Records (UK/worldwide)
- Sambass Album CD – Irma Records (Italy/Japan/USA)
- Sambass (Double vinyl LP 2x12") – Irma Records (Italy/Japan/USA)
- Tambor Y Bajo II - Ritmos de Brasil EP (Double vinyl 2x12") – Phuturo Recordings (San Francisco, USA)
- Gilles Peterson In Brazil (2xCD) Ether Records (UK / Worldwide)
- Sambass 2 (Vinil duplo 2x12") – Irma Records (Italy/Japan/USA)
- Sambass 2 (Album CD) – Irma Records (Italy/Japan/USA)
- Underground Records Brazil Presents #3 (Album CD) URBR - Underground Records (Brazil)
- Liquid V Club Sessions Vol 1 (Album CD) – Liquid V (UK)
- Watergate Files Vol. 1 (Album CD) – Hard:Edged Records (Germany)
