= Marcelinho da Lua =

Brazilian reggae/sambass singer and DJ

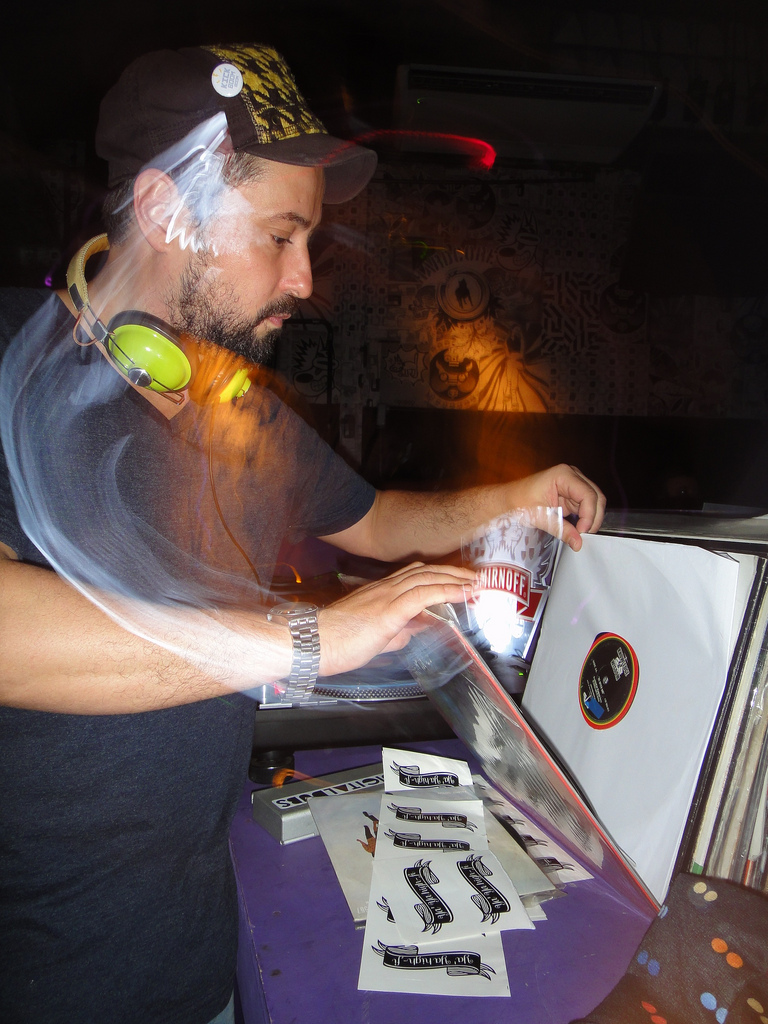
Marcelinho da Lua

Marcelinho da Lua is a Brazilian reggae/sambass singer and DJ. He released the album Tranqüilo in 2003. The album's staple song, "Tranqüilo", was part of the playlist for EA Sports' FIFA 06 video game. Both Seu Jorge and Mart'nália participated to Tranqüilo. Another album, Mad Professor Meets Marcelinho da Lua In a Dubwise Style, features Mad Prof., Bi Ribeiro, Black Alien, Roberto Menescal, as well as Mart'nália and Seu Jorge.
