= Haunting / Workout =

"Haunting" / "Workout"

Single by Andy C

from the album Nightlife 6
- Released: 3 November 2013
- Recorded: 2013
- Genre: Drum and bass
- Length: 5:41 ("Haunting"); 4:08 ("Workout")
- Label: RAM
- Songwriter(s): Andrew John Clarke
- Producer(s): Andy C

Andy C singles chronology
"Get Ready" (2001)	"Haunting" / "Workout" (2013)	"Heartbeat Loud" (2014)

"Haunting" / "Workout" is a double A-side by the British record producer Andy C, released on 3 November 2013 through his renowned drum and bass label RAM Records. "Workout" entered the UK Singles Chart at number 188 and the UK Dance Chart at number 26 on 16 November 2013. The songs serve as singles from Andy C's mix album Nightlife 6.

== Track listing ==
Digital download
No.	Title	Length
1.	"Haunting"	5:41
2.	"Workout"	4:08

== Chart performance ==
=== For "Workout" ===
Chart positions listed for "Workout".

Chart (2013)	Peak position
UK Dance (OCC)	26
UK Indie (OCC)	21
UK Indie Breakers (Official Charts Company)	5
UK Singles (Official Charts Company)	188

== Release history ==
Region	Date	Format	Label
Worldwide	3 November 2013	Digital download; vinyl	RAM
