= Firin' Squad =

- Firin' Squad in 2006.

Background information
- Origin: London, United Kingdom
- Genres: R&B; Hip hop Dancehall; Funky House; Grime
- Occupations: DJ's; Presenters
- Years active: 1993-present
- Members: Chris Vee, Mista Grill & Sean Slimm
- Website: firinsquad.co.uk

Firin' Squad were signed up by Choice FM in August 2007 after having left Kiss 100 where they had a weekly show for seven years. Guests featured on their show have included Kano, Roll Deep and MOBO 2008 award winner Chipmunk. Since January 2007, they have been providing in-flight entertainment for the UK's second largest airline, BMI.

In August 2006 they launched 'Firin’ Squad Unsigned Podcast' - a series of monthly audio programmes

Their show has featured 'beatbox extraordinaire Faith SFX, N-Dubz and Akala.

They won gold at the Sony Radio Academy Awards in 2007, and were nominated again in 2008.

== Clubs ==
They play in the UK and elsewhere. Recent international gigs have included Dubai, New York City, Russia, Ukraine, MTV Block Parties in Lithuania, and through Summer 2008 they hit the holiday hotspots of Ibiza and Ayia Napa.

== Discography ==
=== Albums ===
Firin' Squad have compiled and mixed seven albums to date with the four releases in The Very Best Of Pure R&B series alone having combined sales of over one million CDs.

Year	Title	Peak Chart Position (UK)	Certification (UK)
2001	Pure R&B IV: Released: 10 November 2001; Label: Telstar/BMG; Format:2XCD	35	N/A
2002	The Very Best Of Pure R&B - The Summer Collection: Released: 3 August 2002; Label: Telstar/BMG; Format:2XCD	1	Gold
2002	The Very Best Of Pure R&B - The Winter Collection: Released: 23 November 2002; Label: Telstar/BMG; Format:2XCD	11	Gold
2003	The Very Best Of Pure R&B - The Summer Collection 2003: Released: 31 March 2003; Label: Telstar/BMG; Format:2XCD	2	Gold
2003	The Very Best Of Pure Dancehall: Released: 15 September 2003; Label: Telstar/BMG; Format:2XCD	8	Silver
2003	The Very Best Of Pure R&B - The Winter Collection 2003: Released: 27, October 2003; Label: Telstar/BMG; Format:2XCD	3	Gold
2004	Bling: Released: 26 January 2004; Label: Telstar/BMG; Format:2XCD	2	Gold
