= Tim Reaper =

English jungle DJ and Producer

- Birth name: Ed Alloh
- Born: July 17, 1993 (age 32)
- Origin: London, England, United Kingdom
- Genres: Jungle music
- Instrument: FL Studio
- Labels: Future Retro London

Ed Alloh (born July 17, 1993), known professionally as Tim Reaper, is a music producer and DJ from London specializing in jungle music. He is regarded as one of the key figures of the genre's revival between the late 2010s and early 2020s. His label Future Retro London, originally conceived as a night club, won the Breakthrough Label award at DJ Mag's 2021 Best of British awards.

Besides his success in his home country, he has also played in different European countries and the United States. In 2023, he went on an Asian tour and played in Osaka, Seoul, and Singapore. He currently works as a web developer for NTS Radio.
