= The Sickle Cell Society =

British charity group

The Sickle Cell Society, established as a registered charity in 1979, was founded by a group of people with sickle cell disease, their parents and their physicians, aims to improve understanding and management of the condition. Its chief executive is John James.
