= Zebralution =

German digital distribution company

Zebralution GmbH
- Type: GmbH
- Industry: Digital Distribution - Audio, Video, eBooks, audiobooks, podcasts
- Founded: December 2003
- Headquarters: Berlin, Germany; Offices in: London, UK; Paris, France; Barcelona, Spain; Los Angeles, USA
- Number of employees: 30–35
- Website: www.zebralution.com

Zebralution is a German digital distribution company for independent record labels, audiobooks and podcasts operating worldwide from their Berlin headquarters. In December 2019, GEMA, the German society for musical performing and mechanical reproduction rights, acquired a majority stake.

In March 2026, GEMA sold Zebralution to Bookwire. In November 2026, Warner Music Group, which previously owned the company between 2007 and 2017, fully acquired Zebralution from Bookwire.

== History ==
Founded in 2004 by Sascha Lazimbat (formerly with Vodafone, also lawyer and author) and Kurt Thielen (formerly with Vodafone, longtime CEO of Rough Trade Distribution Germany, audio book publisher with Finch & Zebra) as the first European digital distributor for indie labels the company operates from headquarters in Berlin and offices in Los Angeles, London, Paris, Barcelona, Amsterdam as well as Bochum and Cologne offering distribution, marketing and administrative services. Incorporation and company headquarters from 2004 to 2017 was Ruhr city Duisburg where Thielen was born in 1958, and as a big fan and former board member of the local football club MSV Duisburg whose players are nicknamed The Zebras, commemorated his favorite football club with the company name Zebralution. In 2017, the head office was located to Berlin, where the largest office location has been located since 2005.

In 2007, Warner Music acquired a significant stake in Zebralution GmbH. Zebralution continued operating as a freestanding unit. On April 3, 2017, Warner Music Group agreed to sell Zebralution back to Lazimbat and Thielen, who joined a consortium with Christof Ellinghaus (founder of City Slang) and Konrad von Löhneysen (owner of the Embassy of Music label). Zebralution distributes its catalogue of over 500,000 tracks, albums and videos to hundreds of digital service providers worldwide.

In 2019, the company had a customer base of over 1,000 labels and audio book publishers worldwide. On December 4, 2019, GEMA announced that it had acquired a majority stake of 75.1 percent in Zebralution. As a collecting society for music, GEMA represents the copyrights of around 74,000 members (composers, lyricists, and music publishers) and over two million rights holders worldwide. Zebralution continues to operate as an independent company in Berlin under the umbrella of GEMA. The owners of Zebralution remain shareholders. Thielen and Lazimbat will continue as managing directors. Zebralution and GEMA state that they plan to jointly develop new business areas and unlock new income sources including new Business2Artist offers that, for example, are aimed at performing artists who want to bring their music to the listeners via a wide range of digital music providers, even without a label or record company.

== Products and services ==
Zebralution is a distributor of digital media content, from music and videos to audiobooks and radio plays and e-books to mobile entertainment products.

Zebralution functions as an interface between rights owners, license holders and labels on the one side and digital retailers and services (download, streaming), e.g. iTunes, Amazon, Napster, Beatport, eMusic, Vodafone, Spotify, Deezer, YouTube on the other.

Zebralution's partners include music labels and publishers, producers and artists, as well as book publishers and other entertainment companies from around the world. Zebralution is a member of the German Federal Association of the Music Industry (BVMI), Verband unabhängiger Musikunternehmen (VUT), an association of independent music companies in Germany, the Association of Independent Music (AIM) and the American Association of Independent Music (A2IM), Independent Music Companies Association (IMPALA), the booksellers association of Germany Börsenverein des Deutschen Buchhandels and the Audio Publishers Association (APA).

Labels, publisher, musicians or podcasters use Zebralution to release their contents into digital distribution channels or on streaming services worldwide. Zebralution itself earns a commission for sales and their agency service. The scope of services includes the technical preparation of the digital content, the delivery to the trade, retail marketing and the settlement of sales proceeds to the licensors.

For dashboard technology, Zebralution uses the Musicdata Management Program (MMP) tool by development partner d23. Their data analysis program is a modified version from the English company's Entertainment Intelligence. In 2010 Zebralution developed trade features for audiobooks and radio plays and expanded the audiobook business to an equal segment, partnering with new providers and publishers like Random House Audio or Canongate. This included the installation of own end customer platforms, brands and application software such as the app Spooks which combines accounts with several audiobook publishers into one.
