= Energy Flash =

1998 book by Simon Reynolds

Energy Flash: A Journey Through Rave Music and Dance Culture
- Author: Simon Reynolds
- Language: English
- Genre: Music
- Publisher: Faber & Faber (UK)
- Publication date: 1998
- Publication place: United Kingdom
- Pages: 816
- ISBN: 0571289142

Energy Flash: A Journey Through Rave Music and Dance Culture is a book by English music journalist Simon Reynolds which chronicles the development of dance and rave music from the mid-1980s to the early 2000s. The book was published in the United States under the title Generation Ecstasy: Into the World of Techno and Rave Culture.

The book was originally published in 1998, with the American edition following in 1999. An updated edition was published in 2008 and again in 2013 which charted the rise of dubstep and the popularity of EDM in the US.

== Book chapters ==
Chapter 1 In the book's first chapter, titled "A Tale of Three Cities: Detroit Techno, Chicago House, and New York Garage", Reynolds demonstrates the emergence of electronic music, looking specifically at the cities of Detroit, Chicago, and New York, all three of which were key to the development of this dance-focused genre. In Detroit, both the industrial (past) and post-industrial (present) milieu led emerging DJs to play around with mechanical, futuristic, and technological sounds, having also been inspired by the proliferation of science-fiction media, leading to the creation of techno. In Chicago, house was characterized by repetitive beats, drum machines, and synthesizers, which were heavily used by DJs to create new, exciting sounds for the city's underground gay club scene, which demanded sonic innovation as the disco era waned (although as stated in the reading, never really died). Lastly, in New York, the emergence of the garage music genre was pushed forward in clubs such as Paradise Garage (from where the genre took its name). While electronic beats were still thoroughly used, garage also emphasized the use of R&B and soul female vocals, adhering to a more traditional musical style as opposed to house and techno.
