= DJ Marky =

Brazilian DJ and music producer (born 1973)

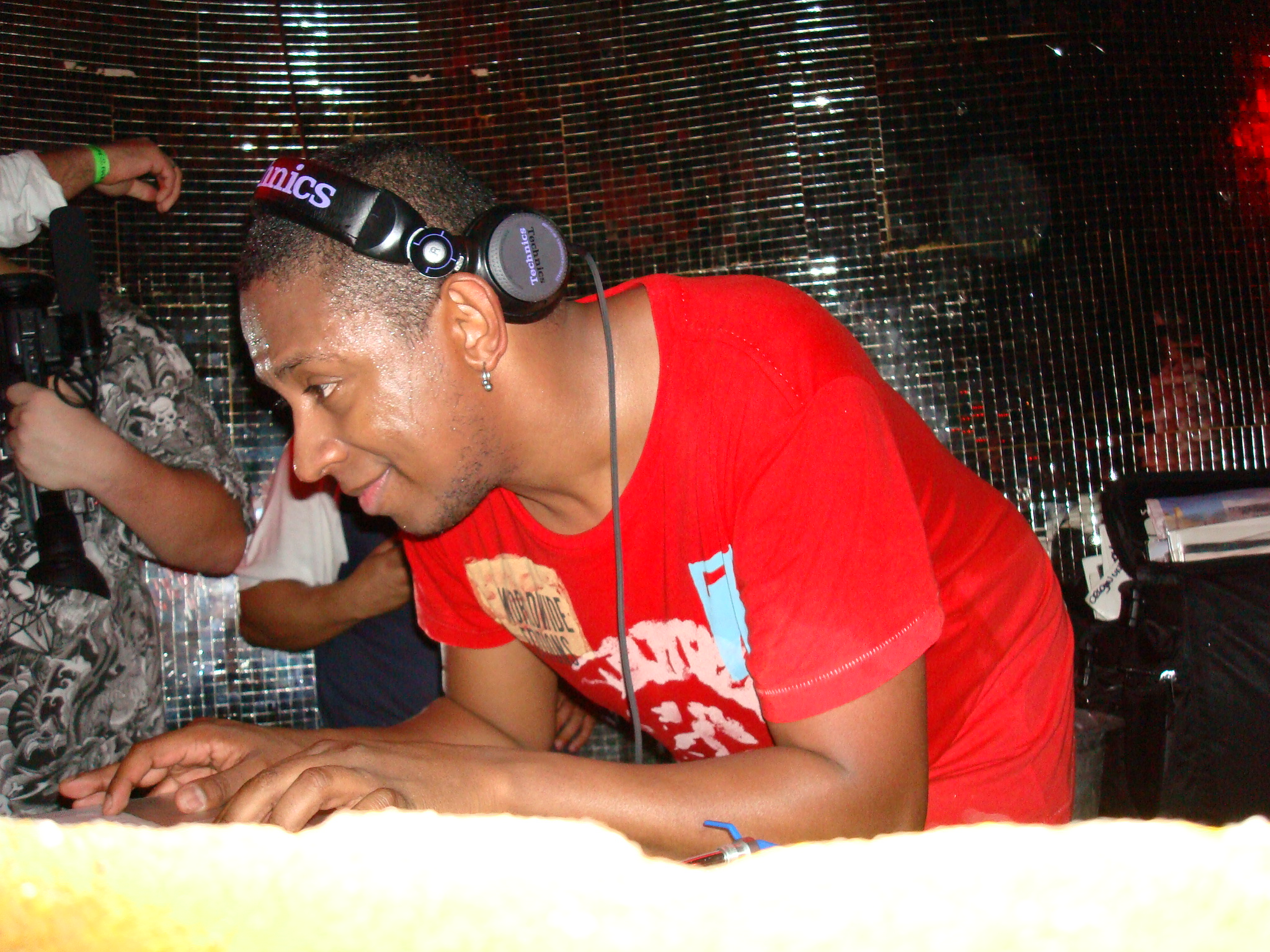
- DJ Marky at Lov.e Club in 2008

Background information
- Born: Marco Antonio da Silva; 14 June 1973 (age 53); São Paulo, Brazil
- Genres: Drum & Bass
- Occupation: DJ
- Years active: 1992–present
- Label: Innerground Records

Marco Antonio da Silva, known professionally as DJ Marky, is a Brazilian drum and bass DJ.

Together with DJ Patife, XRS Land and Drumagick, Brazilians were forging a new sound in drum and bass that became popular around the world with releases such as LK and Só Tinha Que Ser Com Você.

== Career ==
Marky got started in drum and bass in 1992, but by 1997, he went to London and met DJ Hype and Goldie. He was brought to the attention of the English DJ Bryan Gee, head of V Recordings, who saw Marky playing in a club in São Paulo in 1998. He invited the DJ to play in London. This experience resulted in a residency at the club Movement, a subsequent residency at The End club, work for the UK's BBC Radio 1, and global popularity.

In 1999, he was awarded "Best New DJ" by the UK music critics. The recording sessions of his album Working the Mix happened in his house, with two pick-ups, one mixer and vinyl albums. His appeal became more widespread after a two-hour set on BBC Radio 1's Essential Mix in March 2004, and his album In Rotation.

In 2006, DJ Marky played the Lovebox Festival in Victoria Park, east London, as one of the headline acts. In 2012, DJ Marky was a special guest playing at Norman Jay MBE's "Good Times Sound System" at Notting Hill Carnival.

DJ Marky released the album Influences: Compiled & Mixed by DJ Marky through BBE music in August 2008.

Some of Marky's songs can be found in the video game FIFA Street 2. DJ Marky has released music on Innerground Records (a subsidiary of Bulldozer Media).

DJ Marky was managed by Edo van Duijn and Oliver Brown until 2017.

== Awards ==
Award	Category	Result
Knowledge Magazine Awards 2001	Best International DJ	Winner
BBC XtraBass Awards 2007	Best international artist/DJ	Winner
DJ Awards 2008	Dance Nation of the Year (Brazil)	Winner
Rio Music Conference 2013	Best DJ in 2012	Winner
Rio Music Conference 2014	Best DJ in 2013	Nominated
Rio Music Conference 2014	Personality of the Year in 2013	Winner
Drum & Bass Awards 2022	Best international artist	Winner

== Discography ==
=== Albums ===
- The Time Is Right (2023)
- My Heroes (2015)
- Fabriclive 55 (2011)
- In Rotation (2004)

=== Singles ===
- "The Brazilian Job" (with DJ Patife & ESOM feat. Fernando Porto) (2001)
- "LK (Carolina Carol Bela)" (with Xerxes de Oliveira & Stamina MC) (2002)
- "Untitled / Brown Sugar" (2003)
- "Special Lady / Montpellier" (with A Sides) (2005)
- "Battle Mix Volume 2" (with Total Science & Ayah) (2007)
- "Battle Mix Volume 3" (with Total Science) (2007)
- "Moodswings Part 1" (with Muffler & Bungle) (2008)
- "Super Bass / Outside Moon" (with Drumagick) (2009)
- "Ya Thang" (2012)
- "After Midnight / Break The Spell" (with Invaderz) (2013)
- "Silly VIP / Ready To Go" (2017)
