= V Recordings =

British drum and bass record label

- Founded: 1993
- Founder: Bryan Gee; Jumpin Jack Frost
- Genre: Drum and bass; jungle
- Country of origin: United Kingdom
- Location: London
- Official website: vrecordings.com

V Recordings is a drum and bass record label, based in the United Kingdom. It was founded in 1993 by Bryan Gee and Jumpin Jack Frost.

== History ==
Founded in 1993 through the friendship of Bryan Gee and Jumpin Jack Frost, V Recordings is one of the longest-running drum and bass labels and has launched the recording careers of the likes of Roni Size, Krust, and DJ Die.

Gee, originally from Gloucester, was particularly excited by the "Bristol Sound" and working as A&R at a record label at the time, heard some of Roni Size and Krust's early material. Gee and Frost would make the trip to Bristol and decide to set up the label shortly after in order to release some of their music.

The label has released classics of the genre such as "Set Speed" by Krust, "Fresh" by Roni Size, and "Brand New Funk" by Adam F.

The labels' biggest commercial success was "LK (Carolina Carol Bela)" by DJ Marky featuring Stamina MC - which reached #17 in the UK Singles Chart in July 2002.

It has also spawned a number of sub-labels including Philly Blunt, Chronic, and Liquid V. Gee continues to operate the label.

== Artists ==
- Adam F
- Alix Perez
- Calibre
- Dillinja
- DJ Die
- DJ Marky
- DJ Patife
- Ed Rush
- Goldie
- Krust
- Optical
- Peshay
- Ray Keith
- Roni Size
- Social Misfits

== Discography ==
=== Selected singles/EPs ===
- Roni Size - It's A Jazz Thing (1994)
- Roni Size & DJ Die - The Calling (1994)
- Krust - Jazz Note (1994)
- Roni Size - All Crew Must Big Up (1995)
- DJ Die & DJ Suv - Out of Sight (1995)
- Krust - Set Speed (1995)
- Lemon D - I Can't Stop /Changes (1995)
- Krust - Angles (1996)
- Roni Size - Dayz (1996)
- Krust - Warhead (1997)
- Scorpio - Li Li (1997)
- Adam F - Brand New Funk (1998)
- Ray Keith - Do It / The Reckoning (1998)
- Roni Size - Strictly Social (1999)
- Dillinja - Grimey (2002)
- DJ Marky feat Stamina MC - LK (2002)
- Peshay - Solina / How We Used To Live (2011)

=== Compilations ===
- V Classic' (1997)
- Planet V (1999)
- V Forever (2002)
- Return To V (2004)
- Retrospect Vol 1 (2007)
- Bryan Gee Presents: Future (2020)

== See also ==
- List of record labels
- List of jungle and drum n bass record labels
- Drum and bass
