= Ray Keith =

- Also known as: Armageddon, Babylon 5, Dark Soldier, Doctor Wootang, London's Most Wanted, Renegade, Terrorist
- Born: Colchester, Essex, England
- Genres: Electronic, breakbeat, jungle, house
- Occupations: Producer, DJ
- Label: Dread Recordings

Ray Keith is a British drum and bass DJ and record producer. He is one of the genre’s best-known producers and DJs, and was a pivotal figure in the early jungle/drum and bass scene.

== Biography ==
Keith cites influences including underground hip-hop music; electronic acts like Depeche Mode, Orchestral Manoeuvres in the Dark and Gary Numan; and techno artists such as Derrick May, Juan Atkins and Kevin Saunderson. Keith's interest in jazz, funk and soul music led him to buy turntables. He began DJing as a teenager in the 1980s around his native Essex and Suffolk. This was before he got his break DJing on the London acid house and rave scene.

He started working as a recording artist and producer for his own style of music and other genres in 1990. One of his early remixes was a bootleg mix of Orbital's Chime in 1990, which was then officially released in 1992.

He found his niche with drum and bass music. He is famed for producing bass heavy yet soulful tunes and has made classics such as the jungle anthems "Terrorist" and "Chopper". Keith set up Dread Recordings in 1994 and has produced numerous albums. He has also remixed Moby, Shades of Rhythm and Moving Shadow.

His nephew, Peter O'Grady aka Joy Orbison, is also a DJ and producer. Keith is a keen supporter of Manchester United football team.

== Discography ==
=== Studio albums ===
- Contact (UFO, 1999)
- Classified (Dread Recordings, 1999)
- Vintage Dread (Dread Recordings, 2000)
- Alien Encounter (UFO, 2001)
- Twisted Anger – Mothership (Dread Recordings, 2002)
- Blade Runner – Analog Bass (Dread Recordings, 2009)
- Dread Digital Volume 1 and Volume 2 (Dread Recordings, 2010)
- I Am Renegade (Dread Recordings, 2012)
- Ray Keith vs Bladerunner – Dubplate Clash Dub Dread 4 (Dread Recordings, 2012)
- The Golden Years: Back to '94 (Kniteforce Records, 2021)

=== Aliases ===
- Universal Wars [as Dark Soldier] (Dread Recordings, 2000)
- Sinister [as Ray Keith Presents The Dark Soldier] (Dread Recordings, 2001)
- The Universe And Beyond [as Dune] (Kniteforce Records, 2024)
