= Shimon (DJ) =

English DJ and record producer

- Born: Shimon Alcoby
- Genres: Drum and bass
- Labels: Audioporn; Ram
- Member of: Ram Trilogy

Shimon Alcoby, who performs and records music as Shimon, is an English DJ, record producer, and founder of AudioPorn Records. Shimon is also affiliated with the drum and bass record label Ram Records, and has published music through Ram since its inception in 1992. Shimon is one third of Ram Trilogy, a collective which also includes Andy C and Ant Miles.

Shimon's solo record production work includes the singles "The Predator", "Hush Hush", and "The Shadow Knows". The single "Body Rock" reached number 28 in the UK Singles Chart and number 1 on the UK Dance Singles on 6 January 2002.

In 2006, Shimon was asked by Novation Digital Music Systems to produce sounds for their Xio Synth. Shimon is also a breaks producer with releases on Finger Lickin' Records such as "I Like You", "Around the Edge", and "White Noise".

In 2007, Shimon began releasing tracks on his own record label, AudioPorn Records, and was featured as the cover artist in Kmag in December of that year. He was also responsible for the mix CD AudioPorn that was issued with the magazine.

== Singles ==
List of singles, with selected chart positions, showing year released and album name
Title	Year	Peak chart positions		Certifications	Album
Title	Year	UK	UK Dance	Certifications	Album
"Quest" (with Andy C)	1996	95	—		
"Body Rock" (with Andy C)	2001	28	1		Ram Raiders – The Mix
"—" denotes a recording that did not chart or was not released in that territory.
