= Xerxes de Oliveira =

Brazilian drum and bass producer

Xerxes de Oliveira is a drum and bass producer from São Paulo, Brazil. He uses several pseudonyms including XRS, XRS Land, Friendtornik, and Kapitel 06. He is well known in the Brazilian drum and bass scene due to the large number of live PAs he has performed throughout Brazil.

Most of his work has been released on Sambaloco, although he has also released material on the UK's V Recordings imprint (often in collaboration with DJ Marky).
