= DJ Hype =

English record producer and DJ

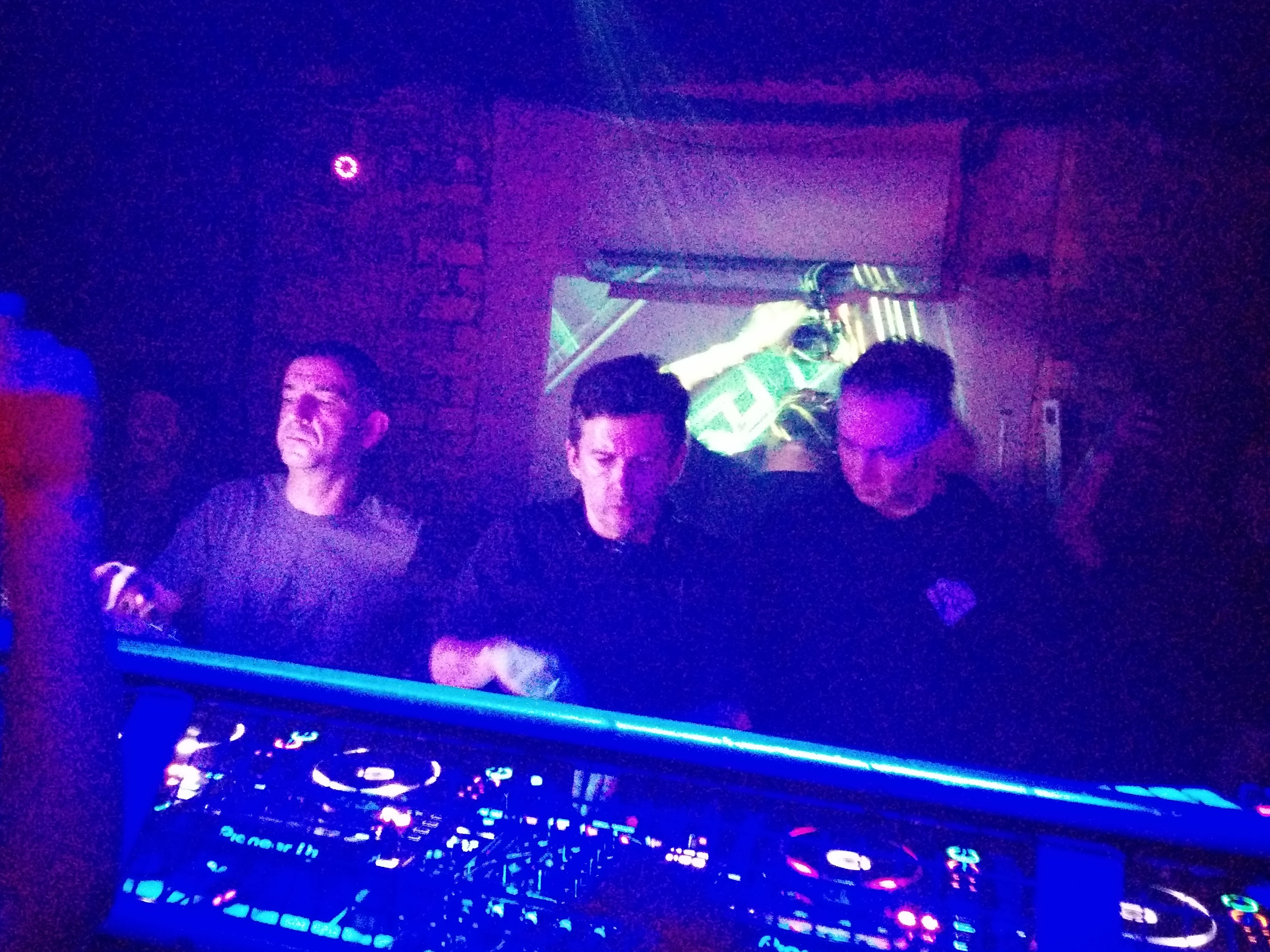
- DJ Hype, Matrix, and Futurebound performing at the Egg nightclub in London on 30 November 2018.

Background information
- Born: Kevin Ford; May 1968 (age 58); London, England
- Genres: Drum and bass, jungle
- Occupations: Record producer, deejay
- Years active: 1982–present
- Website: playaz.co.uk

Kevin Ford (born May 1968), better known as DJ Hype, is a British jungle and drum and bass producer and DJ.

== Biography ==
Hype first became involved in music as a teenager in 1982, assisting PJ and Smiley with their sound system Heatwave in Hackney, East London, which evolved into Shut Up and Dance.

Hype began producing in 1989, engineering and co-producing tracks (including "Exorcist" and "The Bee") for Kickin'Records, Strictly Underground and Suburban Base. UK garage producer Wookie remembers that Hype worked with The Scientist on "The Bee" to create one of the first jungle tunes to hit big, following "£10 to Get In" by Shut Up and Dance in 1989. Around this time, Hype hosted a show on the London pirate radio station Fantasy FM, and he was famed for his mixing and scratching skills.

Suburban Base released Hype's track "Shot in the Dark" that made the UK Singles Chart in 1993. By 1994, he had become a big name in the breakbeat hardcore and jungle raves - landing awards for Best Male DJ and Best Radio DJ (in 1994 and 1995 respectively) at the UK's Hardcore Awards, and hosting a show on the legal station Kiss 100.

Hype's Ganja Records label gained popularity primarily through dance floor fillers such as "You Must Think First", "Tiger Style" and DJ Zinc's "Super Sharp Shooter". Their popularity peaked in 1996 with the release of their first album, Still Smokin' , a label compilation released jointly by Ganja and Pascal's Frontline imprint. Re-released in 1997, its success also led to a major label deal with BMG's Parousia sub-label and the establishment of True Playaz, an MC-led deejay and production unit also including DJ Zinc, Pascal and Rude Bwoy Monty. Hype's 1997 Parousia EP, New Frontiers, with Ganja Kru, reached No. 56 in the UK Albums Chart.

Hype is known for his jump-up deejay sets, including appearances at the Playaz night at Fabric.

On 30 March 2009, Hype released a new double album mix compilation on Rhino Records, entitled DJ Hype presents Drum and Bass Essentials.

== Discography ==
=== Singles/EPs ===
- Exorcist / The Bee (with The Scientist) (Kickin'Records)
- Shot in the Dark (Suburban Base)
- Roll the Beats (Suburban Base)
- Computerised Cops / You Must Think First (with The Ganja Kru) (Ganja Records)
- Tiger Style / Mash Up da Place (with The Ganja Kru) (Ganja Records)
- Super Sharp Shooter (with The Ganja Kru) (Parousia/BMG)

=== Mixes/compilations ===
- Drum & Bass Selection
- FabricLive.03
- FabricLive.18 with Andy C
- Dubplate Killaz
- Dubplate Killaz 2: Return of the Ninja
- World Dance - The Drum 'n' Bass Experience
- Drum & Bass Arena Presents: DJ Hype
- Drum & Bass Essentials - a triple CD compilation mixed by DJ Hype
