= DJ Patife =

Brazilian drum and bass DJ (born 1976)

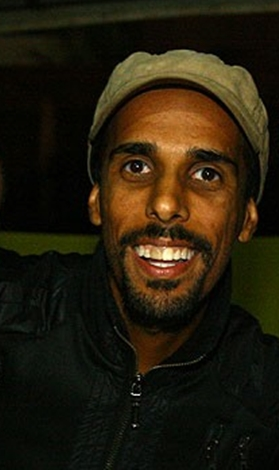
DJ Patife in 2011

Wagner Ribeiro de Souza (born September 15, 1976), better known by his stage name DJ Patife, is a prominent Brazilian drum and bass DJ.

DJ Patife's first gig was at São Paulo's Arena Music Hall. In 1997, he accompanied Roni Size in the delivery of the Mercury Prize. Patife released his first album in 2000, Sounds of Drum'n'bass. The album was praised by English magazines Muzik and Mixmag,.

In 2000, Patife, Marky, and the Drumagick duo played for 5,000 people in São Paulo. Patife's remix for Max de Castro's "Pra Você Lembrar" was a hit in the Londoner dance tracks and was included in the main dance magazines' playlists. Three of Patife's songs were included in the compilation Brazil EP, released by V Recordings. In 2000, he participated in Otto's double-CD Changez Tout – "Samba Pra Burro Dissecado" and in Fernanda Porto's album. Patife played in the 2001 version of the Rock in Rio festival. Also in 2001, he performed in the U.S., Scotland, London, and Amsterdam.
