= Andy C =

English DJ and record producer (born 1976)

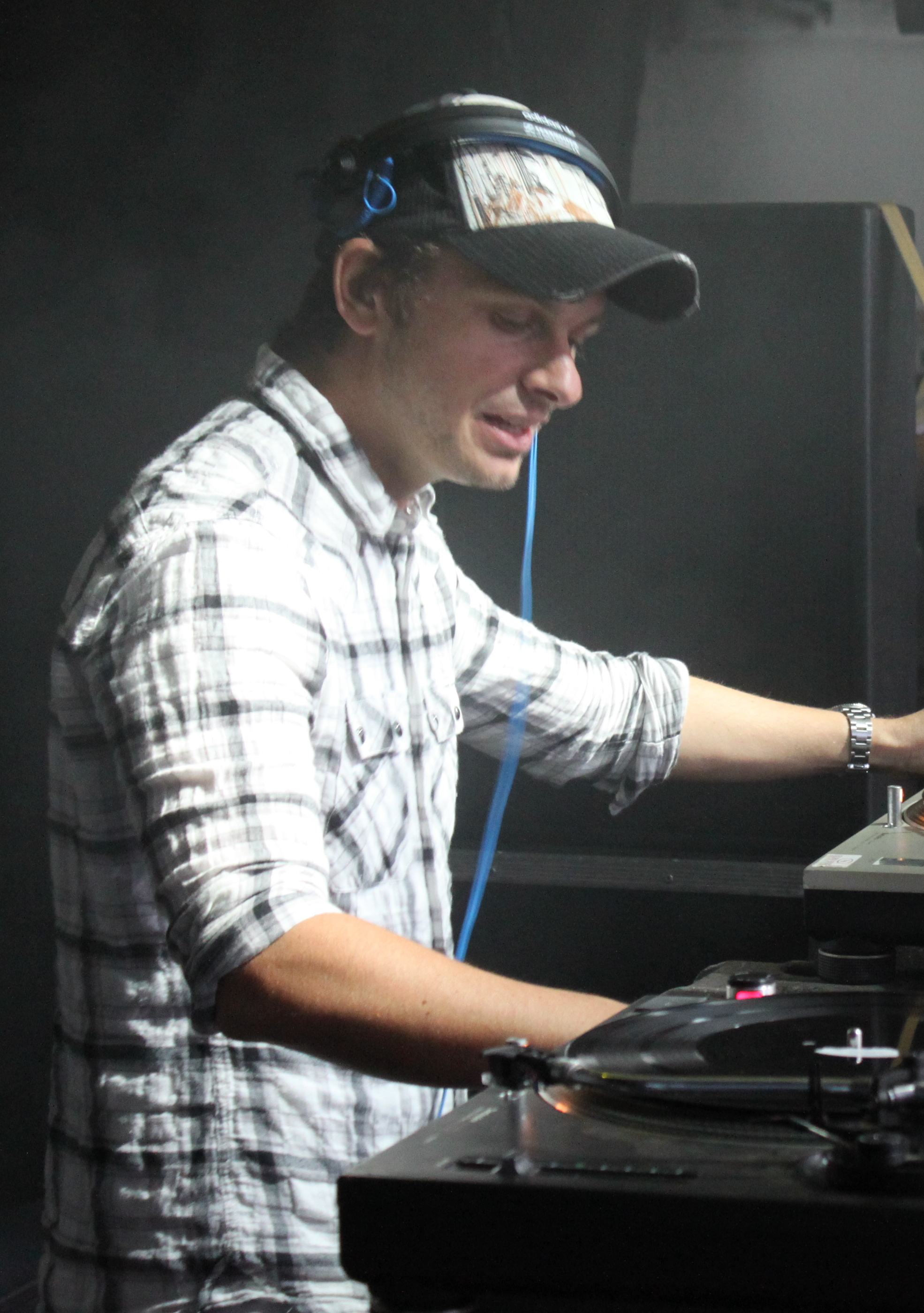
- Clarke in 2011

Background information
- Also known as: The Executioner
- Born: Andrew Michael Clarke; 7 April 1976 (age 50); Walsall, West Midlands, England
- Genre: Drum and bass
- Occupations: DJ; record producer
- Years active: 1991–present
- Label: RAM
- Formerly of: Origin Unknown; Ram Trilogy; Desired State; Concept 2
- Website: www.andyc.cc

Andy C (born Andrew Michael Clarke on April 7, 1976) is an English DJ and record producer. He co-founded RAM Records, a drum and bass label.

== Music career ==
=== Early years ===
Andy C originally found success in 1993 with the track "Valley of the Shadows", which was created and released by Origin Unknown, consisting of Andy C and Ant Miles. It is sometimes referred to as "31 Seconds" or "Long Dark Tunnel" due to the samples it incorporates.

In 2001, he collaborated with Shimon on the single "Body Rock", which reached number 28 on the UK Singles Chart in January 2002. The single used a swinging rhythm and distinguishable synthesizer leads.

Andy C continues to release music through RAM Records, which has signed artists such as Chase & Status, Loadstar, Sub Focus, and Wilkinson. He has performed at festivals including Creamfields, Global Gathering, the Sunbeat Festival, and the Electric Daisy Carnival.

=== 2010–2014 ===
In 2012, Andy C introduced "Andy C Alive", a live performance setup combining DJ mixing with synchronized visual effects. He has performed at venues and festivals in Europe and North America, including SXSW in Texas and Brixton Academy in London.

On 3 November 2013, he released a promotional double A-side single, "Haunting / Workout". It entered the UK Singles Chart at number 188. His next single, "Heartbeat Loud" (with Fiora), was released in November 2014 and made it to number 10 on the UK Singles Chart.

=== 2015–2019 ===
Andy C released the singles "New Era" and "What Bass" in 2016 and 2017 respectively. Throughout 2017, he performed at multiple festivals.

In 2018, Andy C headlined a sold-out show at Wembley Arena, which was reported as the first headline event there by a drum and bass artist.

In 2019, Andy C released the singles "Till Dawn", and "Back & Forth".

=== 2020–present ===
In 2021, Andy C released the singles "Boom" (feat. Tonn Piper), and "Ghost" (feat. DJ Rae).

In 2022, Andy C published a remix of "Firestarter" by The Prodigy.

In 2024, Andy C released the single "Indestructible" with fellow singer Becky Hill. After the release of his next single, "Home in That Bass", he would begin publishing more songs to the Dutch label Armada Music.

== Awards and nominations ==
Andy C ranked number 61 in DJ Magazine's 2010 Top 100 DJs annual poll announced 27 October 2010.

Andy C won the Best DJ award, presented by Drum & Bass Arena, every year from 2009 to 2018.

On 29 November 2013, Andy C won Ambassador of Bass Music in the 2013 Bass Music Awards, and his label Ram Records was nominated for Best Label.

In 2019, Andy C won the "DJ Mag Top 100 DJs – Highest Drum and Bass Award", climbing 11 positions on the previous year to number 79.

== Musical style and influence ==
Andy C is known for rapid mixing and often uses three analogue turntables during performances. His mixing style, referred to as "The Double Drop", involves aligning two songs simultaneously.

== Personal life ==
According to several media interviews, Andy C is married to Natanya and has two daughters. He has described himself as a lifelong fan of the football club West Ham United.

== Discography ==
=== Extended plays ===
Year	Release	Label
1992	Sour Mash	RAM Records
1993	Bass Logic	RAM Records

=== Singles ===
List of singles, with selected chart positions, showing year released and album name
Title	Year	Peak chart positions			Certifications	Album
Title	Year	UK	UK Dance	LAT Air.	Certifications	Album
"Slip N' Slide" / "Bass Constructor" (Remix)	1993	—	—	*		Non-album singles
"Sound Control" / "Feel It" (with Randall)	1994	—	—	*		Non-album singles
"Cool Down" / "Roll On"	1995	—	—	*		Non-album singles
"Sound Control" (Remix) / "Feel It" (Remix) (with Randall)	1995	—	—	*		Non-album singles
"Quest" (with Shimon)	1996	95	—	*		Non-album singles
"Body Rock" (with Shimon)	2001	28	1	*		Ram Raiders – The Mix
"Haunting"	2013	—	—	*		Nightlife 6
"Workout"	2013	188	26	*		Nightlife 6
"Heartbeat Loud" (with Fiora)	2014	50	10	*	BPI: Gold; RMNZ: Platinum	Non-album singles
"New Era"	2016	—	—	*		Non-album singles
"What Bass"	2017	—	—	*		Non-album singles
"Till Dawn"	2019	—	—	—		Non-album singles
"Back & Forth"	2019	—	—	—		Non-album singles
"Boom" (featuring Tonn Piper)	2021	—	—	—		Non-album singles
"Ghost" (featuring DJ Rae)	2021	—	—	—		Non-album singles
"Indestructible" (with Becky Hill)	2024	66	9	7	BPI: Silver	Believe Me Now?
"Positions"	2024	—	—	—		
"—" denotes a recording that did not chart or was not released in that territory. "*" denotes the chart did not exist at that time.

=== Mix CDs ===
Year	Release	Label
1995	Pure Rollers	Sub Base Records USA
2001	RAM Raiders – The Mix	RAM Records
2002	World Dance: XPRS YRSLF	Ministry of Sound
2002	Nightlife	RAM Records
2002	Andy C – Drum & Bass Arena	React
2002	Andy C – Drum & Bass Arena, Version 2	React
2004	FabricLive.18 (with DJ Hype)	Fabric
2004	Nightlife 2	RAM Records
2006	Nightlife 3	RAM Records
2007	Andy C – Drum & Bass Arena: Babylon	Mixmag
2007	Andy C & Grooverider – Drum & Bass Arena	Resist Music
2008	Nightlife 4	RAM Records
2010	Nightlife 5	RAM Records
2013	Nightlife 6	RAM Records

=== Remixes ===
Year	Artist	Remix	Appears On
2010	Shimon	Jazzfreak (Andy C Remix)	
2012	Major Lazer feat. Amber Coffman	Get Free (Andy C Remix)	Nightlife 6
2012	DJ Fresh feat. Dizzee Rascal	The Power (Andy C Remix)	The Power (Remixes)
2012	Plan B	Deepest Shame (Andy C Remix)	Deepest Shame (Remixes)
2012	Eric Prydz	Every Day (Andy C Remix)	Every Day (Remixes)
2013	Mat Zo & Porter Robinson	Easy (Andy C Remix)	Easy (Remixes)
2013	Rudimental feat. Foxes	Right Here (Andy C Remix)	Nightlife 6
2013	Chase & Status feat. Moko	Count on Me (Andy C Remix)	Nightlife 6
2014	London Grammar	Sights (Andy C Remix)	Drum & Bass Arena: Summer Selection 2014
2015	DJ S.K.T feat. Rae	Take Me Away (Andy C Remix)	
2017	Pegboard Nerds	Speed of Light (Andy C Remix)	
2019	Tom Walker	Not Giving In (Andy C Remix)	
2020	The Prodigy	Firestarter (Andy C Remix)	
