= FabricLive.70 =

Compilation album by DJ Friction
- Released: 15 July 2013
- Genre: Electronic
- Length: 2:30:22
- Label: Fabric

FabricLive chronology
| FabricLive.69 (2013) | FabricLive.70 (2013) | FabricLive.71 (2013) |

DJ Friction chronology
| Drum and Bass Arena Presents Friction and Fabio (2008) | FabricLive.70 (2013) |

Professional ratings
Review scores
| Source | Rating |
|---|---|
| Resident Advisor | 4/5 stars |

FabricLive.70 is a DJ mix album by English drum and bass musician DJ Friction. The album was released as part of the FabricLive Mix Series.

== Track listing ==
| No. | Title | Length |
|---|---|---|
| 1. | "Understand" (featuring BTK, Optiv, Sam Wills) | 5:32 |
| 2. | "Swag" (featuring DC Breaks) | 5:12 |
| 3. | "Liberation" (featuring Emperor, Enei) | 2:51 |
| 4. | "Instrument" (featuring Joe Ford) | 5:19 |
| 5. | "One Step" (featuring The Upbeats) | 4:57 |
| 6. | "Mythos" (featuring Inside Info, Mefjus) | 5:13 |
| 7. | "Suddenly VIP" (featuring Nymfo) | 5:37 |
| 8. | "Signs" (featuring Badmarsh & Shri) | 6:00 |
| 9. | "Bristol" (featuring Technimatic) | 1:06 |
| 10. | "Playing Games" (featuring D.Ablo, Alix Perez) | 3:26 |
| 11. | "Another Star" (featuring McLeod, Villem) | 6:48 |
| 12. | "You Can Dream" (featuring Ai) | 2:34 |
| 13. | "Still Waiting" (featuring Total Science) | 5:44 |
| 14. | "Sphere" (featuring Technimatic) | 2:42 |
| 15. | "Biting Point" (featuring Chords) | 5:42 |
| 16. | "Intersection" (featuring Technimatic) | 2:41 |
| 17. | "Annie's Song" (featuring Alix Perez, Sam Wills) | 4:37 |
| 18. | "Keep Pushing Me" (featuring Dramatic) | 2:41 |
| 19. | "Searching" (featuring Kove) | 4:14 |
| 20. | "Gravity" (featuring Shapeshifter) | 5:40 |
| 21. | "Steam Train" (featuring Break) | 5:59 |
| 22. | "Cypher" (featuring Mefjus) | 5:37 |
| 23. | "Dreadnaught" (featuring Mefjus) | 4:26 |
| 24. | "Timekeeper" (featuring Judda, Ulterior Motive) | 6:04 |
| 25. | "Jupiter" (featuring K-Tee) | 1:08 |
| 26. | "Minimal Funk" (featuring Icicle) | 3:47 |
| 27. | "Detroit" (featuring Rockwell) | 4:38 |
| 28. | "Anxious" (featuring Icicle) | 1:08 |
| 29. | "Killa Bees" (featuring The Usual Suspects) | 4:49 |
| 30. | "Horribly Ribbed" (featuring Audio, Donny) | 6:16 |
| 31. | "Lost Contact" (featuring Ulterior Motive) | 5:22 |
| 32. | "Time Tripping" (featuring DJ Hazard) | 2:44 |
| 33. | "Desert Orgy" (featuring Phace & Misanthrop) | 6:46 |
| 34. | "Diplodocus" (featuring Noisia) | 3:02 |
