= FabricLive.68 =

2013 mix album by Calibre

Compilation album by Calibre
- Released: March 18, 2013
- Genre: Drum and bass
- Length: 1:05:11
- Label: Fabric

Calibre chronology
Condition (2011)	FabricLive.68 (2013)	Spill (2013)

FabricLive chronology
FabricLive.67 (2013)	FabricLive.68 (2013)	FabricLive.69 (2013)

Professional ratings
Review scores
Source	Rating
Resident Advisor	4/5 stars

FabricLive.68 is a 2013 DJ mix album by Calibre. The album was released as part of the FabricLive Mix Series.

== Track list ==
No.	Title	Length
1.	"Intro"	1:06
2.	"Keep the Faith" (featuring DRS)	4:45
3.	"Clipper Man"	2:11
4.	"Yellow Shoes [Calibre Remix]" (featuring DJ Marky and S. P. Y.)	0:03
5.	"She's on Fire [Calibre Remix]" (featuring Bo Saris)	3:17
6.	"Emergency [Dub]" (featuring Marcus Intalex)	4:23
7.	"Down Somehow" (featuring Random Movement)	3:28
8.	"Garden [Calibre Remix]" (featuring Totally Enormous Extinct Dinosaurs)	3:39
9.	"Simple Things"	2:50
10.	"Away with Me [Calibre Remix]" (featuring Tamara Blessa and Spectrasoul)	4:06
11.	"Refusal [Calibre Mix]" (featuring Steo and Zero T)	2:11
12.	"Passing Time" (featuring Hellrazor and Lynx)	4:45
13.	"Notting Hill"	2:11
14.	"Inner Disbelief" (featuring DBridge)	5:51
15.	"Hummer"	2:11
16.	"The Jackal [dBridge Remix]" (featuring Kodo)	2:44
17.	"Fire & Water"	3:06
18.	"Justice Over Law" (featuring Genotype)	2:33
19.	"Blazin"	3:39
20.	"Student Music"	4:23
21.	"Outro"	1:49
