= FabricLive.65 =

Compilation album by DJ Hazard
- Released: 17 September 2012
- Genre: Club
- Length: 1:05:48
- Label: Fabric

FabricLive chronology
FabricLive.64 (2012)	FabricLive.65 (2012)	FabricLive.66 (2012)

DJ Hazard chronology
Man of Hazardium	FabricLive.65 (2012)

Professional ratings
Review scores
Source	Rating
Allmusic	3.5/5 stars

FabricLive.65 is a 2012 DJ mix album by DJ Hazard. The album was released as part of the FabricLive Mix Series.

== Track list ==
No.	Title	Length
1.	"Never the Same"	2:07
2.	"Progression" (featuring Misanthrop and Phace)	1:03
3.	"Shock Time" (featuring DJ Devize)	1:03
4.	"Vice Squad" (featuring Tyke)	2:06
5.	"Fox Bite" (featuring Dialogue and Total Recall)	1:03
6.	"Buzzards" (featuring Tyke)	1:45
7.	"Where You At" (featuring Boosta and Atmos T)	0:42
8.	"Cherry Bomb"	1:03
9.	"Diplodocus [The Upbeats Remix]" (featuring Noisia)	1:24
10.	"Time Tripping"	1:24
11.	"Air Guitar"	1:03
12.	"A Bunch of Fives" (featuring Malachai and Voltage)	1:24
13.	"Mr. Jungle [Hazard's Exclusive VIP Mix]" (featuring The Bass Brothers)	1:03
14.	"Deeper Love" (featuring Ray Keith)	1:03
15.	"Your Flex [VIP Mix]" (featuring Sub/Zero)	1:24
16.	"Cool It Judy" (Taxman)	0:42
17.	"Engulfer" (featuring Konichi)	1:24
18.	"Do Without You"	1:24
19.	"Ghetto Blaster" (featuring Annix)	1:03
20.	"Cheek of It" (featuring DJ Rowney)	1:24
21.	"Ramblers"	2:05
22.	"Meen Time"	1:25
23.	"Tools of the Trad" (featuring Konichi)	1:21
24.	"All In" (featuring Decimal Bass)	0:44
25.	"It's a Secret"	1:24
26.	"Coming in Stealth" (featuring DJ Devize and Shookz)	1:23
27.	"Delinquent" (featuring Boosta and Atmos T)	1:03
28.	"They're Not Human" (featuring Retronym)	1:45
29.	"Untitled Monotron" (featuring Joe Seven)	1:45
30.	"X-Groove" (featuring DJ Devize)	1:03
31.	"Iron Fingers" (featuring P.A.)	1:03
32.	"Unnatural Element [VIP Mix]" (featuring Annix)	1:03
33.	"Mr. Happy [DJ Hazard VIP Mix]" (featuring D*Minds)	1:24
34.	"Watch Ya Teeth" (featuring Dirty Harry)	1:03
35.	"Sharade" (featuring Cabbie and Origin)	1:03
36.	"Squash Dem" (featuring DJ Devize)	1:03
37.	"Signol Smoke" (featuring Konichi)	1:03
38.	"Midnight Funk" (featuring Lynx)	1:24
39.	"Cop Killa" (featuring Taxman)	1:03
40.	"Let's Go" (featuring FuntCase)	1:03
41.	"Badman" (featuring Dirty Harry)	1:03
42.	"Gangster" (featuring Mampi Swift)	1:03
43.	"Falling Through" (featuring Noisia and Spor)	1:24
44.	"Hand in Hand"	1:45
45.	"Reefa Tactics" (featuring Decimal Bass)	1:03
46.	"Red Note" (featuring Level 2)	1:45
47.	"Foodfight [VIP Mix]"	1:45
48.	"Droneheads [Octane & DLR Remix]" (featuring Gerra & Stone)	1:03
49.	"Hypnotise" (featuring Decimal Bass)	1:45
50.	"Mark Q"	2:28
