= Fabric 35 =

Compilation album by Ewan Pearson
- Released: 16 July 2007
- Genre: Electronic
- Length: 73:34
- Label: Fabric
- Compiler: Ewan Pearson

Fabric Mix Series chronology
Fabric 34 (2007)	Fabric 35 (2007)	Fabric 36 (2007)

Professional ratings
Review scores
Source	Rating
365mag	8/10 stars
AllMusic	3.5/5 stars
JIVE	4.5/5 stars
Resident Advisor	4/5 stars

Fabric 35 is a DJ mix compilation album by Ewan Pearson, as part of the Fabric Mix Series.

== Track listing ==
1. Jahcoozi – Ali McBills (Robert Johnson 6am X-Ray Italo Rework) – Careless
2. Marc Ashken – Nimrod (Marc Houle Is A Nimrod Remix) – Leftroom
3. Gui.tar – Push in the Bush – Careless
4. Snax – Honeymoon's Over (Konrad Black Remix) – Terranova
5. Jens Zimmermann – Tranquillité – K2
6. Liquid Liquid – Bellhead – DFA
7. Lee Burridge and Dan F – Treat 'em Mean, Keep 'em Keen (Exercise One, Mix 2) – Almost Anonymous
8. 100 Hz – Trustlove – Hi-Phen Music Delivery
9. Samim – Paspd ft. Big Bully – Circus Company
10. Laven & MSO – Looking For God – Klang
11. Simon Baker – Plastik – Infant
12. Samuel L Sessions ft. Paris The Black Fu – Can You Relate – Klap Klap
13. Johannes Heil – All For One (Tobi Neumann's Swinging Remix) – Klang
14. Kaos – Panopeeps (Origin) – Lektroluv
15. Beanfield "Tides" – C's Movement #1 (Carl Craig Remix) – Compost
16. Aril Brikha – Berghain – Kompakt
