= Fabric discography =

fabric discography
- fabric mixtapes: 100
- FABRICLIVE mixtapes: 100
- fabric presents mixtapes: 34
- fabric podcast episodes: 35

From November 2001 to November 2018, the London nightclub fabric ran a monthly mix compilation series. Mixed by a variety of emerging and established DJs, the two series were entitled fabric and FABRICLIVE respectively. The compilation mixes were released independently by fabric on an alternating monthly basis.

In May 2018, fabric announced that the fabric series would end "in its current form" with its 100th installment; in October 2018, fabric revealed the final fabric compilation would be a triple-disc set, mixed by two of the club's residents—Craig Richards and Terry Francis—as well as its founder, Keith Reilly.

In August 2018, the club announced that the FABRICLIVE series would also end with its 100th instalment, and would be mixed by Kode 9—founder of the celebrated underground electronic music label, Hyperdub—and Burial—a pioneering UK dubstep producer.

In January 2019, fabric announced a revamped quarterly mix series, titled fabric presents, coinciding with the club's 20th anniversary celebrations. The inaugural mix of the new series was released in February 2019 — compiled by UK electronic musician, producer, and DJ, Bonobo.

== fabric series (2001–2018) ==
The albums in this series generally feature music in the techno, house, electronic, and tech-house genres. The mixes in the fabric series reflect the kinds of music typically showcased at the nightclub's Saturday night events.

- fabric 01 - Craig Richards (November 2001)
- fabric 02 - Terry Francis (January 2002)
- fabric 03 - Jon Marsh (March 2002)
- fabric 04 - Tony Humphries (May 2002)
- fabric 05 - Pure Science (July 2002)
- fabric 06 - Tyler Stadius (September 2002)
- fabric 07 - Hipp-E & Halo (November 2002)
- fabric 08 - Radioactive Man (January 2003)
- fabric 09 - Slam (March 2003)
- fabric 10 - Doc Martin (May 2003)
- fabric 11 - Swayzak (July 2003)
- fabric 12 - The Amalgamation Of Soundz (September 2003)
- fabric 13 - Michael Mayer (November 2003)
- fabric 14 - Stacey Pullen (January 2004)
- fabric 15 - Craig Richards (March 2004)
- fabric 16 - Eddie Richards (May 2004)
- fabric 17 - Akufen (July 2004)
- fabric 18 - Baby Mammoth, Beige & The Solid Doctor (September 2004)
- fabric 19 - Andrew Weatherall (November 2004)
- fabric 20 - John Digweed (January 2005)
- fabric 21 - DJ Heather (March 2005)
- fabric 22 - Adam Beyer (May 2005)
- fabric 23 - Ivan Smagghe (July 2005)
- fabric 24 - Rob da Bank (September 2005)
- fabric 25 - Carl Craig (November 2005)
- fabric 26 - Global Communication (January 2006)
- fabric 27 - Audion (March 2006)
- fabric 28 - Wiggle (May 2006)
- fabric 29 - Tiefschwarz (July 2006)
- fabric 30 - Rub-N-Tug (September 2006)
- fabric 31 - Marco Carola (November 2006)
- fabric 32 - Luke Slater (January 2007)
- fabric 33 - Ralph Lawson (March 2007)
- fabric 34 - Ellen Allien (May 2007)
- fabric 35 - Ewan Pearson (July 2007)
- fabric 36 - Ricardo Villalobos (September 2007)
- fabric 37 - Steve Bug (November 2007)
- fabric 38 - M.A.N.D.Y. (January 2008)
- fabric 39 - Robert Hood (March 2008)
- fabric 40 - Mark Farina (May 2008)
- fabric 41 - Luciano (July 2008)
- fabric 42 - Âme (September 2008)
- fabric 43 - Metro Area (November 2008)
- fabric 44 - John Tejada (January 2009)
- fabric 45 - Omar-S (March 2009)
- fabric 46 - Claude VonStroke (May 2009)
- fabric 47 - Jay Haze (July 2009)
- fabric 48 - Radio Slave (September 2009)
- fabric 49 - Magda (November 2009)
- fabric 50 - Martyn (January 2010)
- fabric 51 - DJ T. (March 2010)
- fabric 52 - Optimo (Espacio) (May 2010)
- fabric 53 - Surgeon (September 2010)
- fabric 54 - Damian Lazarus (October 2010)
- fabric 55 - Shackleton (December 2010)
- fabric 56 - Derrick Carter (February 2011)
- fabric 57 - Agoria (April 2011)
- fabric 58 - Craig Richards presents the Nothing Special (June 2011)
- fabric 59 - Jamie Jones (August 2011)
- fabric 60 - Dave Clarke (October 2011)
- fabric 61 - Visionquest (December 2011)
- fabric 62 - DJ Sneak (February 2012)
- fabric 63 - Levon Vincent (April 2012)
- fabric 64 - Guy Gerber (June 2012)
- fabric 65 - Matthias Tanzmann (August 2012)
- fabric 66 - Ben Klock (October 2012)
- fabric 67 - Zip (December 2012)
- fabric 68 - Petre Inspirescu (February 2013)
- fabric 69 - Sandwell District (April 2013)
- fabric 70 - Apollonia (June 2013)
- fabric 71 - Cassy (August 2013)
- fabric 72 - Rhadoo (October 2013)
- fabric 73 - Ben Sims (December 2013)
- fabric 74 - Move D (February 2014)
- fabric 75 - Maya Jane Coles (April 2014)
- fabric 76 - Deetron (June 2014)
- fabric 77 - Marcel Dettmann (August 2014)
- fabric 78 - Raresh (October 2014)
- fabric 79 - Prosumer (December 2014)
- fabric 80 - Joseph Capriati (February 2015)
- fabric 81 - Matt Tolfrey (April 2015)
- fabric 82 - Art Department (June 2015)
- fabric 83 - Joris Voorn (August 2015)
- fabric 84 - Mathew Jonson (October 2015)
- fabric 85 - Baby Ford (December 2015)
- fabric 86 - Eats Everything (February 2016)
- fabric 87 - Alan Fitzpatrick (April 2016)
- fabric 88 - Ryan Elliott (June 2016)
- fabric 89 - Gerd Janson (August 2016)
- fabric 90 - Scuba (October 2016)
- fabric 91 - Nina Kraviz (December 2016)
- fabric 92 - Call Super (February 2017)
- fabric 93 - Soul Clap (April 2017)
- fabric 94 - Steffi (June 2017)
- fabric 95 - Roman Flügel (October 2017)
- fabric 96 - DVS1 (December 2017)
- fabric 97 - Tale of Us (February 2018)
- fabric 98 - Maceo Plex (April 2018)
- fabric 99 - Sasha (June 2018)
- fabric 100 - Craig Richards, Terry Francis, and Keith Reilly (November 2018)

== FABRICLIVE series (2001–2018) ==
The albums in this series generally feature music in the UK bass, drum & bass, grime, and hip hop genres. 'Live' in the series' title does not in fact indicate that the mixes were recorded live. The mixes in the FABRICLIVE series reflect the kinds of music typically showcased at the nightclub's Friday night events.

- FABRICLIVE.01 - James Lavelle (December 2001)
- FABRICLIVE.02 - Ali B (February 2002)
- FABRICLIVE.03 - DJ Hype (April 2002)
- FABRICLIVE.04 - Deadly Avenger (June 2002)
- FABRICLIVE.05 - Howie B (August 2002)
- FABRICLIVE.06 - Grooverider (October 2002)
- FABRICLIVE.07 - John Peel (December 2002)
- FABRICLIVE.08 - Plump DJs (February 2003)
- FABRICLIVE.09 - Jacques Lu Cont (April 2003)
- FABRICLIVE.10 - Fabio (June 2003)
- FABRICLIVE.11 - Bent (August 2003)
- FABRICLIVE.12 - Bugz in the Attic (October 2003)
- FABRICLIVE.13 - J Majik (December 2003)
- FABRICLIVE.14 - DJ Spinbad (February 2004)
- FABRICLIVE.15 - Nitin Sawhney (April 2004)
- FABRICLIVE.16 - Adam Freeland (June 2004)
- FABRICLIVE.17 - Aim (August 2004)
- FABRICLIVE.18 - Andy C & DJ Hype (October 2004)
- FABRICLIVE.19 - The Freestylers (December 2004)
- FABRICLIVE.20 - Joe Ransom (February 2005)
- FABRICLIVE.21 - Meat Katie (April 2005)
- FABRICLIVE.22 - Scratch Perverts (June 2005)
- FABRICLIVE.23 - Death in Vegas (August 2005)
- FABRICLIVE.24 - Diplo (October 2005)
- FABRICLIVE.25 - High Contrast (December 2005)
- FABRICLIVE.26 - The Herbaliser (February 2006)
- FABRICLIVE.27 - DJ Format (April 2006)
- FABRICLIVE.28 - Evil Nine (June 2006)
- FABRICLIVE.29 - Cut Copy (September 2006)
- FABRICLIVE.30 - Stanton Warriors (October 2006)
- FABRICLIVE.31 - The Glimmers (December 2006)
- FABRICLIVE.32 - Tayo (February 2007)
- FABRICLIVE.33 - Spank Rock (April 2007)
- FABRICLIVE.34 - Krafty Kuts (June 2007)
- FABRICLIVE.35 - Marcus Intalex (August 2007)
- FABRICLIVE.36 - James Murphy & Pat Mahoney (October 2007)
- FABRICLIVE.37 - Caspa & Rusko (December 2007)
- FABRICLIVE.38 - DJ Craze (February 2008)
- FABRICLIVE.39 - DJ Yoda (April 2008)
- FABRICLIVE.40 - Noisia (June 2008)
- FABRICLIVE.41 - Simian Mobile Disco (August 2008)
- FABRICLIVE.42 - Freq Nasty (October 2008)
- FABRICLIVE.43 - Switch & Sinden (December 2008)
- FABRICLIVE.44 - Commix (February 2009)
- FABRICLIVE.45 - A-Trak (April 2009)
- FABRICLIVE.46 - LTJ Bukem (June 2009)
- FABRICLIVE.47 - Toddla T (August 2009)
- FABRICLIVE.48 - Filthy Dukes (October 2009)
- FABRICLIVE.49 - Buraka Som Sistema (December 2009)
- FABRICLIVE.50 - dBridge & Instra:mental Present Autonomic (February 2010)
- FABRICLIVE.51 - The Duke Dumont (April 2010)
- FABRICLIVE.52 - Zero T (August 2010)
- FABRICLIVE.53 - Drop the Lime (September 2010)
- FABRICLIVE.54 - David Rodigan (November 2010)
- FABRICLIVE.55 - DJ Marky (January 2011)
- FABRICLIVE.56 - Pearson Sound / Ramadanman (March 2011)
- FABRICLIVE.57 - Jackmaster (May 2011)
- FABRICLIVE.58 - Goldie (July 2011)
- FABRICLIVE.59 - Four Tet (September 2011)
- FABRICLIVE.60 - Brodinski (November 2011)
- FABRICLIVE.61 - Pinch (January 2012)
- FABRICLIVE.62 - Kasra (March 2012)
- FABRICLIVE.63 - Digital Soundboy Soundsystem (May 2012)
- FABRICLIVE.64 - Oneman (July 2012)
- FABRICLIVE.65 - DJ Hazard (September 2012)
- FABRICLIVE.66 - Daniel Avery (November 2012)
- FABRICLIVE.67 - Ben UFO (January 2013)
- FABRICLIVE.68 - Calibre (March 2013)
- FABRICLIVE.69 - Fake Blood (May 2013)
- FABRICLIVE.70 - Friction (July 2013)
- FABRICLIVE.71 - DJ EZ (September 2013)
- FABRICLIVE.72 - Boys Noize (November 2013)
- FABRICLIVE.73 - Pangaea (January 2014)
- FABRICLIVE.74 - Jack Beats (March 2014)
- FABRICLIVE.75 - Elijah & Skilliam (May 2014)
- FABRICLIVE.76 - Calyx & TeeBee (July 2014)
- FABRICLIVE.77 - Erol Alkan (September 2014)
- FABRICLIVE.78 - Illum Sphere (November 2014)
- FABRICLIVE.79 - Jimmy Edgar (January 2015)
- FABRICLIVE.80 - Mumdance (March 2015)
- FABRICLIVE.81 - Monki (May 2015)
- FABRICLIVE.82 - Ed Rush & Optical (July 2015)
- FABRICLIVE.83 - Logan Sama (September 2015)
- FABRICLIVE.84 - Dub Phizix (November 2015)
- FABRICLIVE.85 - Jesse Rose (January 2016)
- FABRICLIVE.86 - My Nu Leng (March 2016)
- FABRICLIVE.87 - Groove Armada (May 2016)
- FABRICLIVE.88 - Flava D (July 2016)
- FABRICLIVE.89 - Hannah Wants (September 2016)
- FABRICLIVE.90 - Kahn & Neek (November 2016)
- FABRICLIVE.91 - Special Request (March 2017)
- FABRICLIVE.92 - Preditah (May 2017)
- FABRICLIVE.93 - Daphni (aka Caribou) (July 2017)
- FABRICLIVE.94 - Midland (September 2017)
- FABRICLIVE.95 - Mefjus (November 2017)
- FABRICLIVE.96 - Skream (January 2018)
- FABRICLIVE.97 - Holy Goof (March 2018)
- FABRICLIVE.98 - Dimension (May 2018)
- FABRICLIVE.99 - DJ Q (July 2018)
- FABRICLIVE.100 - Kode9 and Burial (September 2018)

== fabric presents series (2019–present) ==
- fabric presents: Bonobo (February 2019)
- fabric presents: Kölsch (May 2019)
- fabric presents: The Martinez Brothers (September 2019)
- fabric presents: Amelie Lens (November 2019)
- fabric presents: Maribou State (March 2020)
- fabric presents: Chase & Status (October 2020)
- fabric presents: Octo Octa & Eris Drew (November 2020)
- fabric presents: Danilo Plessow (Motor City Drum Ensemble) (May 2021)
- fabric presents: Overmono (July 2021)
- fabric presents: Sherelle (November 2021)
- fabric presents: Leon Vynehall (March 2022)
- fabric presents: TSHA (May 2022)
- fabric presents: Mind Against (September 2022)
- fabric presents: Nicola Cruz (November 2022)
- fabric presents: Chaos in the CBD (March 2023)
- fabric presents: Saoirse (July 2023)
- fabric presents: Helena Hauff (September 2023)
- fabric presents: Sama' Abdulhadi (November 2023)
- fabric presents: Shygirl (April 2024)
- fabric presents: The Streets (July 2024)
- fabric presents: Confidence Man (August 2024)
- fabric presents: Rødhåd (September 2024)
- fabric presents: Laurent Garnier (November 2024)
- fabric presents: Carlita (April 2025)
- fabric presents: Laurent Garnier (May 2025)
- fabric presents: Pretty Girl (June 2025)
- fabric presents: Laurent Garnier (July 2025)
- fabric presents: salute (October 2025)
- fabric presents: Floorplan (November 2025)
- fabric presents: DJ Tennis (February 2026)
- fabric presents: Red Axes (March 2026)
- fabric presents: Eliza Rose (May 2026)
- fabric presents: Mount Kimbie (July 2026)
- fabric presents: Max Cooper (October 2026)

== fabric podcast series (2007–2010) ==
- fabric podcast 01 - Craig Richards (09-10-2007)
- fabric podcast 02 - Andrew Weatherall (20-11-2007)
- fabric podcast 03 - Doc Scott (19-12-2007)
- fabric podcast 04 - Jonny Trunk Part 1 (08-01-2008)
- fabric podcast 05 - Jonny Trunk Part 2 (23-01-2008)
- fabric podcast 06 - Ross Allen Part 1 (13-02-2008)
- fabric podcast 07 - Ross Allen Part 2 (26-02-2008)
- fabric podcast 08 - Keith Reilly Part 1 (11-03-2008)
- fabric podcast 09 - Keith Reilly Part 2 (26-03-2008)
- fabric podcast 10 - Peanut Butter Wolf & James Pants (08-04-2008)
- fabric podcast 11 - Peanut Butter Wolf & James Pants Part 2 (22-04-2008)
- fabric podcast 12 - Howie B (13-05-2008)
- fabric podcast 13 - Howie B Part 2 (27-05-2008)
- fabric podcast 14 - Don Letts (12-06-2008)
- fabric podcast 15 - Don Letts Part 2 (24-06-2008)
- fabric podcast 16 - Zed Bias (16-07-2008)
- fabric podcast 17 - Zed Bias Part 2 (04-08-2008)
- fabric podcast 18 - Greg Wilson (26-08-2008)
- fabric podcast 19 - Greg Wilson Part 2 (28-08-2008)
- fabric podcast 20 - Kid Batchelor (30-09-2008)
- fabric podcast 21 - Kid Batchelor Part 2 (21-10-2008)
- fabric podcast 22 - Jazzanova (13-01-2009)
- fabric podcast 23 - Jazzanova Part 2 (22-01-2009)
- fabric podcast 24 - Mad Professor (24-02-2009)
- fabric podcast 25 - Mad Professor Part 2 (29-02-2009)
- fabric podcast 26 - Dave Dorrell (28-04-2009)
- fabric podcast 27 - Dave Dorrell Part 2 (29-04-2009)
- fabric podcast 28 - DJ Vadim (01-06-2009)
- fabric podcast 29 - DJ Vadim Part 2 (11-06-2009)
- fabric podcast 30 - Malcolm Catto (13-07-2009)
- fabric podcast 31 - Malcolm Catto Part 2 (26-07-2009)
- fabric podcast 32 - Surgeon (24-08-2009)
- fabric podcast 33 - Surgeon Part 2 (25-08-2009)
- fabric podcast 34 - Four Tet (05-04-2010)
- fabric podcast 35 - Four Tet Part 2 (06-04-2010)

== See also ==
- DJ-Kicks
- Solid Steel
