= FabricLive.82 =

Compilation album by Ed Rush & Optical
- Released: 24 July 2015
- Genre: Drum and bass
- Length: 4:28:48
- Label: Fabric

FabricLive chronology
FabricLive.81 (2015)	FabricLive.82 (2015)	FabricLive.83 (2015)

Ed Rush & Optical chronology
Travel the Galaxy (2009)	FabricLive.82 (2015)	No Cure (2015)

Professional ratings
Review scores
Source	Rating
Resident Advisor	1.5/5 stars

FabricLive.82 is a DJ mix album by English drum and bass musicians Ed Rush and Optical. The album was released in July 2015 as part of the FabricLive Mix Series.

== Track listing ==
No.	Title	Length
1.	"FabricLive.82: Continuous DJ Mix"	01:08:26
2.	"Shape the Random" (featuring Phace)	4:57
3.	"Chubrub"	7:00
4.	"Full Force" (featuring State of Mind)	5:58
5.	"Dive Bomb" (featuring BTK, Optiv)	5:20
6.	"Incessant" (featuring Noisia)	5:21
7.	"Scarabs"	3:02
8.	"Headroom" (featuring Audio)	5:20
9.	"The Host"	6:37
10.	"Loner" (featuring Current Value)	4:23
11.	"Clockout" (featuring Signs)	2:59
12.	"Until the World Ends" (featuring Black Sun Empire, State of Mind)	5:43
13.	"Saus" (featuring Mefjus, June Miller)	4:50
14.	"Whip Slap" (featuring Dimension)	3:51
15.	"Straight to Bad" (featuring Grotesque, Maztek)	5:33
16.	"Know Your Place" (featuring Jade, State of Mind, Mindscape)	5:08
17.	"Stamp Out" (featuring Noisia)	5:41
18.	"Surrounded" (featuring Mefjus)	6:19
19.	"Influx" (featuring Neonlight, Wintermute)	4:58
20.	"Purge" (featuring Detune)	4:32
21.	"Insomnia" (featuring Neonlight, Wintermute)	5:26
22.	"Heads Up" (featuring Audio)	5:09
23.	"Reptilians" (featuring Hybris, Mefjus, Noisia)	3:33
24.	"Badass" (featuring Hypoxia)	4:13
25.	"Aztec" (featuring Spor)	4:31
26.	"Watermelon"	7:05
27.	"Shaman" (featuring DC Breaks)	5:09
28.	"I Need More" (featuring Misanthrop)	4:20
29.	"The Infection" (featuring BTK)	5:42
30.	"Messiah" (featuring Konflict)	7:03
31.	"Collision" (featuring Audio)	6:15
32.	"Drama" (featuring Hybrid Minds)	5:03
33.	"Acid Test" (featuring Signs)	2:30
34.	"Inside Out" (featuring BTK, Optiv)	5:31
35.	"Never Stop" (featuring Neonlight, Wintermute)	5:54
36.	"Stompbox" (featuring The Qemists)	5:43
37.	"The Turnover"	4:30
38.	"Stutter" (featuring Mefjus, Misanthrop)	5:12
39.	"Footprint" (featuring BTK, Maztek, Optiv)	5:31
40.	"Jack Nicholson" (featuring Black Sun Empire, State of Mind)	4:30
