= FabricLive.62 =

Compilation album by Kasra
- Released: March 19, 2012
- Genre: Electronic
- Length: 1:09:58
- Label: Fabric
- Producer: Kasra

FabricLive chronology
FabricLive.61 (2012)	FabricLive.62 (2012)	FabricLive.63 (2012)

Professional ratings
Review scores
Source	Rating
AllMusic	4/5 stars
Resident Advisor	4/5 stars

FabricLive.62 is a 2012 DJ mix album by Kasra. The album was released as part of the FabricLive Mix Series.

== Track list ==
No.	Title	Length
1.	"Underpass" (featuring Rockwell)	2:36
2.	"Detuned Souls" (featuring Foreign Concept)	2:13
3.	"Handmade" (featuring Dub Phizix)	1:50
4.	"Micro Organism" (featuring Phace, Noisia)	2:13
5.	"The Cleaner" (featuring Hybris)	1:51
6.	"Oblique" (featuring Halogenix, Frank Carter III, Sabre, Stray)	2:58
7.	"Uprising" (featuring Mortem)	2:13
8.	"Myriads (Jubei Remix)" (featuring Alix Perez)	2:13
9.	"Soundwaves" (featuring The Break)	1:51
10.	"Pressure Plate" (featuring Judda)	2:13
11.	"Codec" (featuring Dub Phizix)	3:43
12.	"Make My Drink" (featuring Hybris)	1:51
13.	"So Real" (featuring Enei)	1:29
14.	"Machines" (featuring Enei)	2:13
15.	"Obsession (Foreign Concept Remix)" (featuring MC D.R.S., Enei)	2:58
16.	"Back to the Jungle" (featuring Bladerunner)	1:51
17.	"New Beginning" (featuring S.P.Y)	1:29
18.	"MPD" (featuring Noisia, Phace)	1:51
19.	"Mob Justice (Enei Remix)" (featuring Foreign Concept)	2:58
20.	"Version" (featuring Commix)	3:20
21.	"We R the Ones (Ulterior Motive Remix)" (featuring Klute)	2:36
22.	"Regain Control" (featuring Xtrah)	2:58
23.	"Resources" (featuring Icicle, Rockwell)	2:36
24.	"Killswitch Engage" (featuring June Miller, Proxima)	2:33
25.	"Count to Ten" (featuring MC D.R.S., Enei)	3:01
26.	"Pursuit" (featuring Mark System)	2:35
27.	"Just a Game" (featuring Break, Mikal)	2:14
28.	"No Fear (Spectrasoul Remix)" (featuring Enei, Riya)	1:51
29.	"Timbre" (featuring Stray)	3:40
