= Fabric 31 =

2006 mix album by Marco Carola

Compilation album by Marco Carola
- Released: November 2006
- Genre: Electronic music
- Length: 73:13
- Label: Fabric

Fabric Mix Series chronology
Fabric 30	Fabric 31	Fabric 32

Professional ratings
Review scores
Source	Rating
About.com	4/5 stars
AllMusic	3.5/5 stars
JIVE	4.5/5 stars
Resident Advisor	4/5 stars

Fabric 31 is a DJ mix compilation album by Marco Carola, as part of the Fabric Mix Series.

== Track listing ==
1. Matt John - Io
2. Erikotanabe - Waj Rebbag (Eclat & Prudo - Alfa Romero Remix)
3. Chris Carrier - Sure Shot
4. Marek Bois - You Got Good Ash (Gabriel Ananda Remix)
5. Fusiphorm - I Am...You! (Someone Else Remix)
6. Timo Anttila - Nakuta
7. Barem - Cilindro
8. Mathias Kaden - Snowman
9. Paco Osuna - Cretine
10. Fraktion - Acidrop
11. Marc Houle - Kicker
12. Audio Werner - Onandon
13. Dolly La Parton - Whenever
14. Microfunk AKA 2000 And One and Dave Ellesmere - Pecan
15. Detail - Change
16. Dario Zenker - Newbe (Heartthrob’s Are U Gay Remix)
17. Ernie - Escarabajos
18. Alex Smoke - Plunder
