= FabricLive.67 =

Compilation album by Ben UFO
- Released: January 21, 2013
- Genre: Electronic
- Length: 2:33:13
- Label: Fabric

FabricLive chronology
| FabricLive.66 (2012) | FabricLive.67 (2013) | FabricLive.68 (2013) |

Ben UFO chronology
| Rinse: 16 (2011) | FabricLive.67 (2013) |

Professional ratings
Review scores
| Source | Rating |
|---|---|
| Resident Advisor | 4/5 stars |

FabricLive.67 is a 2013 DJ mix album by Ben UFO. The album was released as part of the FabricLive Mix Series.

== Track list ==
| No. | Title | Length |
|---|---|---|
| 1. | "Dub" (featuring Mix Mup) | 3:43 |
| 2. | "Feelings" (featuring Delroy Edwards) | 6:01 |
| 3. | "Raw Code" (featuring Kowton and Peverelist) | 5:57 |
| 4. | "The Tortoise [Sex Tags Mania Nyc Mix]" (featuring Tim "Love" Lee) | 5:20 |
| 5. | "Zone" (featuring Elgato) | 8:25 |
| 6. | "Twisted Balloon" (featuring Gesloten Cirkel) | 5:50 |
| 7. | "It's Ok" (featuring Chicago Skyway) | 3:46 |
| 8. | "Project 5 (Untitled B1)" (featuring K-Hand) | 6:39 |
| 9. | "Pendoulous" (featuring Fluxion) | 6:03 |
| 10. | "Consexual" (featuring Minimal Man) | 6:00 |
| 11. | "Club Thanz" (featuring Jam City) | 3:45 |
| 12. | "Take Me Back" (featuring Herbert) | 7:38 |
| 13. | "Looser" (featuring Lowtec) | 7:16 |
| 14. | "Clutch" (featuring Pearson Sound) | 4:43 |
| 15. | "I'm Strong" (featuring Mr. Fingers) | 5:21 |
| 16. | "Mukuba Special" (featuring Kasai Allstars and Shackleton) | 10:38 |
| 17. | "Zug Island" (featuring Kyle Hall and Kero) | 4:09 |
| 18. | "Ping" (featuring Circuit Breaker) | 5:15 |
| 19. | "Bout Ready to Jak [Shake Remix]" (featuring Osborne) | 4:54 |
| 20. | "Jovian Planet" (featuring Juniper) | 5:59 |
| 21. | "Malfunction (Despair)" (featuring A Made Up Sound) | 6:56 |
| 22. | "Untitled" (featuring Grain) | 6:20 |
| 23. | "Perc" (featuring Bandshell) | 5:23 |
| 24. | "And Both His Sons" (featuring Blawan) | 4:39 |
| 25. | "Release" (featuring Pangaea) | 5:07 |
| 26. | "Danger (Locked Groove)" (featuring Floating Points) | 5:03 |
| 27. | "I.C.E. [Kuedo Remix]" (featuring Main Attrakionz and Grown Folk) | 2:23 |
