= FabricLive.66 =

Compilation album by Daniel Avery
- Released: November 19, 2012
- Genre: Club
- Length: 1:16:23
- Label: Fabric

FabricLive chronology
FabricLive.65	FabricLive.66	FabricLive.67

Daniel Avery chronology
FabricLive.66 (2012)	Drone Logic (2013)

Professional ratings
Review scores
Source	Rating
Allmusic	4/5 stars
Resident Advisor	4.5/5 stars

FabricLive.66 is a 2012 DJ mix album by Daniel Avery. The album was released as part of the FabricLive Mix Series.

== Track list ==
No.	Title	Length
1.	"The Eagle"	0:09
2.	"Shake" (featuring Cowboy Rhythmbox)	4:47
3.	"Kanal [Prins Thomas Sure Oppstøt]" (featuring The Telephones)	1:35
4.	"Touch Yourself" (featuring ReWork)	1:03
5.	"Troubleman" (featuring Nautiluss)	3:56
6.	"Need Electric"	0:07
7.	"Naïve Reception"	3:56
8.	"You Think You Think" (featuring The Sneaker)	5:52
9.	"Supermoon" (featuring Simian Mobile Disco)	3:12
10.	"Game Theory" (featuring Magnets)	4:12
11.	"Effect Tweak" (featuring Deadstock 33's)	0:35
12.	"Water Jump"	7:32
13.	"Something Borrowed" (featuring James Welsh)	2:20
14.	"Taste"	1:02
15.	"Elegant Mistakes" (featuring Forward Strategy Group)	1:55
16.	"Way Savvy [Gatto Fritto Remix]" (featuring Jr Seaton)	8:06
17.	"Libillule [Matt Walsh Remix]" (featuring Morgan Hammer)	2:37
18.	"It's OK [Prince Club Remix]" (Viadrina)	5:34
19.	"Girlz" (featuring Miss Kittin)	4:33
20.	"Dancing and Slaving" (featuring Raudive)	4:19
21.	"Workshop 12 (A1)" (featuring Kassem Mosse)	0:43
22.	"Dry Heat" (featuring The Asphodells)	4:25
23.	"Sequoia" (featuring Compuphonic)	3:53
