= FabricLive.35 =

Compilation album by Marcus Intalex
- Released: 20 August 2007
- Genre: Drum and Bass
- Label: Fabric

FabricLive chronology
| FabricLive.34 (2007) | FabricLive.35 (2007) | FabricLive.36 (2007) |

FabricLive.35 is a DJ mix compilation album by Marcus Intalex, as part of the FabricLive Mix Series.

== Track listing ==
1. Calibre ft. Lariman - Over Reaction - Signature
2. Calibre - All the Days - Signature
3. Lynx ft. Kemo - Global Enemies - Soul:r
4. Commix - Faceless (Marcus Intalex Remix) - Shogun
5. Jonny L - Come Here - Mr L Records
6. Amaning vs Dubwise - Smash V.I.P - Soul:r
7. Soulmatic - Self Belief - Good Looking
8. Calibre ft. DRS - Hustlin' - Signature
9. Calibre - Mr Right On - Signature
10. Deadly Habit - Synesthesia (Theory Remix) - Tentative
11. Breakage - Clarendon - Digital Soundboy
12. Alix Perez & Lynx - Allegiance - Soul:r
13. Zero Tolerance ft. Steo - Refusal - Soul:r
14. Mist:ical - Time to Fly - Soul:r
15. Duo Infernale - Feeling Blue - Soul:r
16. Instra:Mental - Pacific Heights - Darkestral
17. Bango Collective ft. Kemo & Dennis Jones - Apocalypse - Soul:r
18. Mist:ical - Groove Me - Soul:r
19. Alix Perez & Sabre - Solitary Native - SGN:LTD
