= FabricLive.72 =

Compilation album by Boys Noize
- Released: 18 November 2013
- Genre: Electronic
- Length: 1:12:09
- Label: Fabric

FabricLive chronology
FabricLive.71 (2013)	FabricLive.72 (2013)	FabricLive.73 (2014)

Boys Noize chronology
Out of the Black (2012)	FabricLive.72 (2013)

Professional ratings
Review scores
Source	Rating
AllMusic	3.5/5 stars
Resident Advisor	2/5 stars

FabricLive.72 is a DJ mix album by German electronic music producer and DJ Boys Noize. The album was released as part of the FabricLive Mix Series.

== Track listing ==
No.	Title	Length
1.	"Solid" (featuring Marilyn Manson, Mr. Oizo)	2:42
2.	"Starwin"	2:33
3.	"Pegasus" (featuring Costello)	1:16
4.	"Shout" (featuring Jimmy Edgar)	2:02
5.	"Warehouse" (featuring Surkin)	3:00
6.	"Go On Girl" (featuring Feadz)	1:15
7.	"Ghettocoder" (featuring Pilo)	1:44
8.	"Femme Litre" (featuring Kingdom)	1:29
9.	"All Day (Robert Hood Remix)" (featuring Gingy & Bordello)	2:29
10.	"For These Times" (featuring Four Tet)	2:14
11.	"Meat & Dancing" (featuring Randomer)	1:59
12.	"TFB" (featuring Kowton)	0:59
13.	"Anoid"	3:28
14.	"Selekta (Valentino Khan Remix)" (featuring DJ Craze)	1:15
15.	"Chella Ride" (featuring Dog Blood)	3:21
16.	"Tric Trac" (featuring Eats Everything, Worthy)	1:28
17.	"Kaikō" (featuring Djedjotronic)	1:49
18.	"Aufstand" (featuring Gesaffelstein)	1:59
19.	"Luft" (featuring Aden)	2:58
20.	"Wall To Wall" (featuring Special Request)	1:44
21.	"P O T" (featuring Anthony Naples)	1:28
22.	"Work This MF" (featuring DJ Deeon)	0:53
23.	"Motor" (featuring Tracques)	1:59
24.	"The Compass" (featuring Dave Clarke)	2:06
25.	"Nothing But Pleasure [Boys Noize Pressure Fix]" (featuring Tom Rowlands)	2:36
26.	"Andrea" (featuring Alesia)	1:29
27.	"Maje" (featuring The Chain)	1:29
28.	"XTC" (featuring Spank Rock)	6:13
29.	"Space Invaders Are Smoking Grass" (featuring I-F)	2:36
30.	"Goldfisch/XTC" (featuring Kölsch)	2:44
31.	"Arcadia" (featuring Apparat)	6:52
