= Rhino Entertainment =

American record label

Rhino Entertainment Company
- Parent company: Warner Music Group
- Founded: 1978; 48 years ago
- Founder: Harold Bronson; Richard Foos
- Distributors: Self-distributed; (United States); Warner Music Group; (International)
- Genre: Various
- Country of origin: United States
- Location: 777 S. Santa Fe Avenue, Los Angeles, California, U.S.
- Official website: rhino.com

Rhino Entertainment Company (formerly Rhino Records Inc.) is an American specialty record label and production company founded in 1978. It is currently the catalog division for Warner Music Group. Its current CEO is Mark Pinkus.

== History ==
Founded in 1978, Rhino was originally a novelty and reissue label during the 1970s and 1980s. It released compilation albums of pop, rock & roll, and rhythm & blues successes from the 1950s through the 1980s, as well as novelty-song LPs (compiled in-house or by Dr. Demento) and retrospectives of famous comedy performers, including Richard Pryor, Stan Freberg, Tom Lehrer, and Spike Jones.

Rhino started as a record shop on Westwood Boulevard, Los Angeles, in 1973, run by Richard Foos, and became a record distributor five years later thanks to the effort of then-store manager Harold Bronson. Their early releases were mostly novelty records (such as their first single, in 1975, Wild Man Fischer's "Go to Rhino Records"). The difficulties involved in getting airplay and distribution for such material eventually caused Foos and Bronson to take the label in other directions. One of Rhino's early artists was The Twisters, whose Los Angeles popularity far exceeded their album sales. Rhino's mail-order catalogs and early LP labels featured the company's mascot character Rocky—a cartoon greaser rhinoceros wearing a black leather jacket, designed by bootleg cover artist William Stout, and later cartoonist Scott Shaw.

The original Rhino logo, designed by William Stout

Some of the label's earliest successes with re-issues were achieved by acquiring the rights to the White Whale Records catalog that included the Turtles. By the mid-1980s, most of Rhino's releases were re-issues of previously released recordings licensed from other companies. For superior sound quality, audio mastering of the original tapes (where possible) was done under the direction of Bill Inglot, and the label's creative packaging made Rhino one of the most respected re-issue record labels, receiving rave reviews from music collectors, fans, and historians; and later, Grammy nominations and awards. Rhino was quick to get into the compact disc market, releasing dozens of oldies CDs at the dawn of the CD age in 1984. Their retrospective compact disc releases, such as those in the Billboard Top Hits series (Billboard Top Dance Hits), are often remastered to restore or improve upon the releases' original analog audio quality.

In the late 1980s, Rhino transitioned into a complete entertainment company specializing in home video (initially VHS, then DVD and Blu-ray) reissues of television programs such as The Monkees, The Lone Ranger, The Transformers, Mystery Science Theater 3000, and Ed Sullivan's Rock 'n' Roll Classics collection, as well as compact disc releases of select artists and movie soundtracks.

Through the 1980s and 1990s, the company's head of A&R, Gary Stewart, signed artists who recorded new music, including Cindy Lee Berryhill, Steve Wynn, Rank and File, Gene Clark and Carla Olson, The Textones, and NRBQ. These albums were released on the main Rhino label and on subsidiary labels such as RNA (Rhino New Artists) and Forward. However, the company's artists tended to generate more critical acclaim than public interest; for the most part, sales totals in the low five figures or less were routine for Rhino-produced albums, and the less costly, less risky re-issue business remained the company's primary revenue stream. One exception was the success of "At This Moment" by Billy Vera and the Beaters, a 1981 song that went to the top of the U.S. Billboard charts in late 1986 after being featured in an episode of the hit NBC TV series Family Ties. In 1986, Rhino Records had signed a deal with New World Pictures to set up a feature film company called Rhino Films. The first project planned by Rhino Films was to be a film about the rock band Big Daddy, which was a Rhino group that was returned to the US after several years of absence.

In 1985, Rhino signed a six-year distribution agreement with Capitol Records. During 1989 Rhino and Capitol's parent EMI made a deal to jointly acquire Roulette Records; Rhino received the U.S. rights to Roulette's catalog, excluding jazz. When the distribution deal with Capitol ended in 1992, Rhino signed a new distribution deal with Atlantic Records, and in turn Time Warner bought a 50 percent stake in the record company. In 1993, Rhino's home video unit ended its deal with Uni and moved its deal to A*Vision Entertainment. In 1998, Time Warner bought the other half of Rhino, making the company a wholly owned unit of Time Warner. The Rhino Records retail store, which was part of the 50% sale in 1992 but which reverted to Foos after Time Warner bought out the remainder, closed in 2005.

It was through this merger that the label reissued material from such artists as the Monkees, Eric Burdon, Fanny, Dannii Minogue, the Ramones, The Grateful Dead, Emerson, Lake & Palmer, the Beach Boys, Yes, the Doobie Brothers, the Cars, Chicago, Tom Paxton, Third Eye Blind, the Doors, War, Spirit of the West and, most recently, the Bee Gees; as well as soundtracks spanning the Turner-owned pre-1986 MGM and pre-1950 Warner Bros. periods, in addition to WB's own post-1949 period. (Note: Warner Bros. retained a pair of features from 1949 that they merely distributed; all short subjects released on or after September 1, 1948; and all cartoons released in August 1948) Rhino's soundtrack releases include Gone with the Wind, The Wizard of Oz, Easter Parade, North by Northwest, Casablanca, King Kong, Doctor Zhivago, Superman, and Finian's Rainbow. The Turner Entertainment and Warner Bros. film soundtrack libraries are currently managed by Warner Bros.' in-house label subsidiary, WaterTower Music.

In 1999, Rhino started the 'Rhino Handmade' division of limited-edition releases available primarily from their website. All Handmade deluxe editions were limited to about 3,000 copies or fewer, and once sold out were not re-pressed. In 2003, co-founders and longtime executives Richard Foos and Harold Bronson left Rhino, reportedly due to frustration with the challenges of an increasingly competitive market. In fact, Time Warner's final vesting of its 100 percent ownership of the label, and its subsequent 'reorganization' of label staff, which did not stop at the former owners, were the major factors in their exits. Soon after, Foos inaugurated a new label, Shout! Factory, which began releasing dozens of CDs and videos mirroring the original early-1990s Rhino philosophy.

In 2004, Time Warner spun off its music divisions and today Rhino is part of the newly organized Warner Music Group.

In addition to dealing with archive material, the label also manages the U.S. distribution or worldwide production of compilations for more recent Warner acts, including still-active artists such as Enya, New Order, and Chicago.

In June 2006, Warner Strategic Marketing in the U.K. was dissolved and Rhino Records U.K. was formed. The division has two main factions: TV-advertised compilations (for example Pure Garage Rewind Back to the Old School) and catalog material from the Warner vaults. Led Zeppelin's 2007 release Mothership and the soundtrack to the film Juno are among the label's successes.

In 2013, WMG acquired certain EMI assets divested by Universal Music Group including Parlophone and worldwide rights to Roulette Records. Those assets are now managed by Rhino.

== Street Jams ==
Street Jams is a series of compilation albums issued by Rhino Entertainment between 1992 and 1994. The albums catalogue a number of influential old school hip hop and electro 12" singles that were released in the early to mid-1980s.

While a few of the singles are early releases from Hip-Hop artists who would go on to greater success later on in the decade such as Run-DMC and Slick Rick, the majority of the tracks in the series are considered one-hit wonders by acts who have fallen into relative obscurity but that had a profound impact upon the Hip-Hop/electro scene of the 1980s and influenced some of the more well known artists of that time.

== See also ==
- List of record labels
