= FabricLive.64 =

Compilation album by DJ Oneman
- Released: July 16, 2012
- Genres: UK garage, electronic
- Length: 1:07:22
- Label: Fabric

FabricLive chronology
FabricLive.63 (2012)	FabricLive.64 (2012)	FabricLive.65 (2012)

DJ Oneman chronology
Rinse: 11 (2010)	FabricLive.64 (2012)	Solitaire Vol.1 (2013)

Professional ratings
Review scores
Source	Rating
AllMusic	4/5 stars
Pitchfork Media	8.0/10
Resident Advisor	3.5/5.0

FabricLive.64 is a 2012 DJ mix album by English DJ and producer Oneman. The album was released as part of the FabricLive mix series.

== Track listing ==
No.	Title	Length
1.	"?" (featuring Mark Pritchard)	3:39
2.	"Night Hunter" (featuring Fis-T)	2:12
3.	"Move Down Low (VIP)" (featuring Grievous Angel)	2:16
4.	"2020" (featuring SBTRKT)	2:29
5.	"Club Lonely (Dem 2 Lonely Vocal Remix)" (featuring Groove Connektion 2)	3:12
6.	"Gold Bricks, I See You" (featuring Mosca)	0:59
7.	"Further" (featuring Lando Kal)	3:45
8.	"Salsa" (Doubleheart)	2:14
9.	"Untitled" (featuring Pearson Sound)	4:25
10.	"The Ha Dub Rewerk'd" (featuring Mike Q)	2:01
11.	"Anytime" (featuring Nu-Birth)	4:43
12.	"Vector" (featuring Bok Bok)	0:59
13.	"The Shrew Would Have Cushioned the Blow" (featuring Joy Orbison)	3:29
14.	"Feel Me" (featuring Distance)	3:13
15.	"Soul What (VIP)" (featuring Boddika)	3:14
16.	"Red Alert (Steve Gurley Mix)" (featuring Basement Jaxx)	3:43
17.	"Wut (Claude Vonstroke's Butt Naked Mix)" (featuring Girl Unit)	2:43
18.	"Ellipsis" (featuring Joy Orbison)	2:59
19.	"Somebody Else's Guy (Tuff Jam's Classic Garage Mix)" (featuring CeCe Peniston)	2:10
20.	"Shawty (VIP)" (featuring Teeth!)	0:48
21.	"Something in Your Eyes (Underground Solution Mix)" (featuring Ed Case)	2:29
22.	"Switch" (featuring Thefft)	1:59
23.	"Pulse Y (Remix)" (featuring Youngstar)	2:03
24.	"Etched Headplate" (featuring Burial)	5:38
