= FabricLive.45 =

2009 mix album by A-Trak

Compilation album by A-Trak
- Released: April 2009
- Genre: Electro-hop, house
- Label: Fabric
- Producer: A-Trak

A-Trak chronology
Running Man: Nike+ Original Run	FabricLive.45 (2009)	Infinity+1 (2009)

FabricLive chronology
FabricLive.44 (2009)	FabricLive.45 (2009)	FabricLive.46 (2009)

FabricLive.45 is a 2009 album by A-Trak. The album was released as part of the FabricLive Mix Series.

== Track listing ==
1. "Say Whoa" A-Trak Fool's Gold Records / "You can't Hide from your Bud DJ Sneak Classic
2. "Oh! Boys Noize -(A-Trak Remix) – Boysnoize Records
3. "Mothership Reconnection (Daft Punk Remix)" Scott Grooves ft. Parliament Funkadelic – – Soma
4. "Get on Down" by Voodoo Chilli, licensed from Cheap Thrills
5. Sweet Mother (House Version) Skepta Boy Better Know
6. I'm the Ish DJ Class -- Unruly
7. Heartbreaker (Diskjokke Remix) Metronomy licensed from Becausey
8. Peep Thong His Majesty Andre – – Cheap Thrills
9. "Forza (Original)" by Zombie Nation UKW
10. Aurora Alex Gopher Go 4 Music
11. Dance Area – AA 24-7 – Phantasy
12. Robbie Rivera – Move Move (DJ Observer & Daniel Heathcliff Remix) – Juicy
13. Daniele Papini – Church of Nonsense – Media
14. Laidback Luke & A-Trak – Shake it Down – Fool's Gold
15. Nacho Lovers – Acid Life (Nachos 909 Dub) – Fool's Gold
16. Rob Threezy – The Chase – Rob Threezy
17. Friendly Fires – Paris (Aeroplane Remix) – XL
18. Fan Death – Veronica's Veil (Erol Alkan's Extended Rework) – Phantasy
19. Infant Presents Simon Baker – Plastik (Todd Terje's Turkatech Remix) – Playhouse
20. The Martian – Tobacco Ties – Red Planet
21. DJ Gant-Man – Juke dat Girl – Fool's Gold
22. DJ MP4 – The Book is on the Table – Music Nets
23. Jamie Anderson & Content – Body Jackin' – International DeeJay Gigolo Records
24. Raffertie – Do Dat – On the Brink
25. DJ Zinc – 138 Trek – Bingo Beats

== Reception ==
In a review for AllMusic, Dave Shim proclaims that "A-Trak has released a mix tailor made for dance floor enthusiasts rather than fader-flicking musos." FabricLive.45 brings together older club styles with newer club beats "seamlessly mashed up in jaw-dropping new configurations".
