= FabricLive.63 =

Compilation album by Digital Soundboy Soundsystem
- Released: April 23, 2012
- Genre: Electronic
- Length: 1:11:00
- Label: Fabric
- Producer: Digital Soundboy Soundsystem

FabricLive chronology
FabricLive.62 (2012)	FabricLive.63 (2012)	FabricLive.64 (2012)

FabricLive.63 is a 2012 DJ mix album by Digital Soundboy Soundsystem. The album was released as part of the FabricLive Mix Series.

== Track list ==
No.	Title	Length
1.	"Funkier Than a Mosquito's Tweeter" (featuring Nina Simone)	2:23
2.	"Gumbai" (featuring Bloodfire)	2:13
3.	"Heavy Water Riddim" (featuring Zed Bias)	1:28
4.	"Body Language" (featuring M.A.N.D.Y. and Booka Shade)	1:25
5.	"LEZGO" (featuring Ardalan)	1:02
6.	"The Oracle" (featuring Roska)	1:27
7.	"Face Up" (featuring Seiji)	0:57
8.	"Red" (featuring Artwork)	1:46
9.	"Do Without You" (featuring Baxta)	1:03
10.	"Hex" (featuring Pangaea)	1:23
11.	"Grinding" (featuring Tickles)	0:55
12.	"Formula 2" (featuring Youngstar)	1:35
13.	"Silo Pass" (featuring Bok Bok)	1:20
14.	"Higher [Skanky Remix]" (featuring Night Drugs and Moona)	1:23
15.	"Wobble That Gut" (featuring Skream)	1:48
16.	"Telepathy" (featuring Breakage)	3:09
17.	"Total Recall" (featuring Rod Azlan and The Others)	1:31
18.	"Fright Night" (featuring North Base)	1:24
19.	"Warp" (featuring Dismantle)	1:21
20.	"Higher" (featuring Breakage)	1:21
21.	"Ain't Nobody [Breakage's Suck It Up Mix]" (featuring Clare Maguire)	2:15
22.	"480 BC" (featuring Roska)	1:04
23.	"Filth" (featuring Skream)	1:37
24.	"Displaced" (featuring Dismantle)	2:15
25.	"Source 16" (featuring Redlight)	0:54
26.	"More Funk" (featuring Dismantle)	1:08
27.	"Baby Girl" (featuring Baxta)	1:49
28.	"Neon" (featuring Dark Sky)	1:05
29.	"Firing Line" (featuring Die & Mensah)	1:39
30.	"Hangover (BaBaBa)" (featuring Buraka Som Sistema)	2:02
31.	"Daim" (featuring Skream)	0:27
32.	"Hard" (featuring Breakage, Newham Generals and David Rodigan)	0:54
33.	"Together" (featuring Breakage / David Rodigan)	0:15
34.	"Peace & Dub" (featuring Die & Break, Bugsy and MC Fats)	1:31
35.	"Raver [Shy's Guinness Punch Mix]" (featuring Donae'o, Shy FX, Roses Gabor and Kano)	2:17
36.	"Pass the Dutchie" (featuring Musical Youth)	0:59
37.	"Pass the Kouchie" (featuring The Mighty Diamonds, Mr. Williamz and Yellowman)	2:18
38.	"Grand Funk Hustle" (featuring Die & Break)	1:44
39.	"Turn Down the Lights" (featuring Benny Page)	1:05
40.	"One DJ" (featuring A Sides)	1:46
41.	"Little Things" (featuring DBridge)	0:42
42.	"Run Em Out" (featuring Breakage and Roots Manuva)	1:41
43.	"Tear Down VIP" (featuring Die & Break)	0:25
44.	"Fighting Fire [dBridge Remix]" (featuring Breakage and Jess Mills)	1:47
45.	"Marka" (featuring Dub Phizix, Skeptical and Strategy)	1:03
46.	"Jus' a Rascal [Soundboy Special]" (featuring Dizzee Rascal)	1:04
47.	"Hold You [Shy FX & Benny Page Digital Soundboy Remix]" (featuring Gyptian)	1:22
48.	"Headlock" (featuring Rene Lavice)	1:23
49.	"Original Nuttah" (featuring UK Apachi and Shy FX)	1:35
