= FabricLive.73 =

Compilation album by Pangaea
- Released: 20 January 2014
- Genre: Electronic
- Length: 1:16:18
- Label: Fabric

FabricLive chronology
FabricLive.72 (2013)	FabricLive.73 (2014)	FabricLive.74 (2014)

Professional ratings
Aggregate scores
Source	Rating
Metacritic	78/100
Review scores
Source	Rating
Resident Advisor	4/5 stars
Pitchfork Media	(7.7/10)

FabricLive.73 is a DJ mix album by electronic artist Pangaea. It was released in 2014, as part of the FabricLive Mix Series.

== Track listing ==
No.	Title	Length
1.	"Recreational Slumming"	3:54
2.	"Plos 97s" (featuring Lee Gamble)	2:01
3.	"Momentum" (featuring Reeko)	2:02
4.	"Resolve" (featuring Hodge)	2:04
5.	"Untitled B2" (featuring Shifted)	3:25
6.	"His Temple" (featuring Mystica Tribe)	3:10
7.	"Romantic Self" (featuring Manni Dee)	2:40
8.	"Untitled #5" (featuring Tripeo)	2:31
9.	"Blunt Run" (featuring Mgun)	2:19
10.	"Maum" (featuring The Sun God)	1:56
11.	"SEA (The Time Gate)" (featuring Stenny & Andrea)	3:38
12.	"Arcade" (featuring Psyk)	1:56
13.	"Truth" (featuring Mumdance & MAO)	1:56
14.	"Refraction" (featuring Adam Jay)	4:21
15.	"Starburst" (featuring Pearson Sound)	5:05
16.	"Osmium" (featuring Kobosil)	4:09
17.	"End Point" (featuring Pev & Kowton)	3:23
18.	"Clean Neckline" (featuring Forward Strategy Group)	1:47
19.	"Something For Your Mind" (featuring Speedy J)	1:58
20.	"37ml" (featuring Bleaching Agent)	2:54
21.	"Bodega V2" (featuring Truncate)	2:25
22.	"I Wanna Dance? In Outer Space" (featuring Marco Shuttle)	3:38
23.	"Disturbance (Pfirter Remix II)" (featuring Drumcell)	3:23
24.	"Crystal Pond" (featuring Imaginary Softwoods)	1:34
25.	"PTR" (featuring Alex Falk)	3:22
26.	"46 (Antaganists Mix)" (featuring Oscar Mulero)	2:24
27.	"Near-Heart Object" (featuring Astronomical Telegram)	2:23
