= Fabric 29 =

Compilation album by Tiefschwarz
- Released: July 2006
- Genre: Electronic music
- Length: 73:00
- Label: Fabric
- Producer: Jochen Schmalbach

Fabric Mix Series chronology
Fabric 28 (2006)	Fabric 29 (2006)	Fabric 30 (2006)

Professional ratings
Review scores
Source	Rating
About.com	4.5/5 stars
BBC Collective	4.5/5 stars
JIVE	5/5 stars
Resident Advisor	4/5 stars

Fabric 29 is a DJ mix compilation album by Tiefschwarz. It is part of the Fabric Mix Series.

== Track listing ==
1. Louder Bach aka Troy Pierce - Grace (Anxiety) - Underl_ne (5:59)
2. Claude VonStroke - Who's Afraid of Detroit? - Dirtybird (5:43)
3. Tiefschwarz - Damage (M.A.N.D.Y. Remix) - Fine (6:22)
4. Theodor Zox - Extruder (Maetrik Remix) - Tic Tac Toe (4:27)
5. Touane - Bassic - Persona (5:27)
6. Thomas Schumacher - Rotor - Spiel Zeug (5:40)
7. Night On Earth - Rondell - Kickboxer (5:06)
8. GummiHz - A.A.K.N.Y. - Mobilee (2:49)
9. Inchundu - Hey - Souvenir (6:19)
10. Jamie Jones - Amazon - Freak 'N' Chic (4:17)
11. Sleeper Thief - Freefall - 64 Records (4:25)
12. Depeche Mode - John The Revelator (Dave Is In The Disco Dub) - Mute (6:48)
13. Riton - The Hammer of Thor - Souvenir (5:52)
14. Kate Wax - Beetles and Spiders (Roman Flügel Remix) - Mental Groove (3:40)
