= FabricLive.34 =

Compilation album by Krafty Kuts
- Released: June 2007
- Genre: Electronic music
- Label: Fabric

Krafty Kuts chronology
Freakshow (2006)	FabricLive.34 (2007)	Back To Mine: Krafty Kuts (2008)

FabricLive chronology
FabricLive.33 (2007)	FabricLive.34 (2007)	FabricLive.35 (2007)

FabricLive.34 is a DJ mix compilation album by Krafty Kuts, as part of the FabricLive Mix Series.

== Track listing ==
1. Krafty Kuts - Intro (FabricLive Mix CD Version) - Against the Grain/Supercharged Music
2. 2 tracks mixed:
  1. A Skillz - Jelly - Finger Lickin'
  2. Lords of the Underground - What I'm After (Acapella) - Capitol
3. 2 tracks mixed:
  1. Milke - She Says - Adrift
  2. Grandmaster Flash and the Furious Five - "The Message" (Acapella) - Sanctuary
4. Malente - Move your Body - Unique
5. Lady Waks & Hardy Hand ft. Mr X "Minimal" - Minimal - Menu
6. Friendly - It's the Weekend - Finger Lickin'
7. Krafty Kuts ft. Tim Deluxe - Bass Phenomenon (VIP Mix) - Against the Grain/Supercharged Music
8. Krafty Kuts & DJ Icey - Thru the Door (Krafty Kuts Remix) - Against the Grain/Zone
9. Dave Spoon - At Night (Beat Vandals Remix) - Toolroom
10. Krafty Kuts vs. Deepcut - Beer Chucker - Deepcut
11. Maelstrom - Disto Funk - Menu
12. Splitloop - Tweaked Out - Supercharged Music/Against the Grain
13. Krafty Kuts ft. Ashley Slater - Freakshow (VIP Mix) - Against the Grain/Supercharged Music
14. Plump DJs - Listen to the Baddest - Finger Lickin'
15. Madox - Roger Milla - Expanded
16. Ralph Robles - Takin' Over - Fania
17. 2 tracks mixed:
  1. Joe Jackson - Is She Really Going Out with Him? - A&M
  2. Deekline & Ed Solo ft. DJ Assault - One in the Front (Acapella) - Rat
18. Rob le Pitch - Twisted (Tom Real and Rogue Element Mix) - Passenger
19. Aquasky ft. Acafool - Have A Good Time - Passenger
20. 2 tracks mixed:
  1. Freestylers ft. Corinna Greyson - In Love with You (Instrumental) - Against the Grain/Supercharged Music
  2. Krafty Kuts ft. Dynamite MC - There they Go (Acapella) - Against the Grain/Supercharged Music
21. Primal Scream - Funky Jam - Sony BMG
