= Kristal Glam Club =

Kristal Glam Club is a club in Bucharest, Romania. Since 2012, the new location of the club is in the center of Bucharest, on Bd. Regina Elisabeta. It was awarded as one of the best venues in Romania and Southeast Europe, and has consistently appeared in DJmag's Top 100 Clubs since 2005. Focusing mainly on electronic music events, it has hosted renowned artists such as James Zabiela, Steve Lawler, Sasha, Lee Burridge and Ricardo Villalobos.

== Sunwaves ==
Sunwaves
- Genre: Electronic music
- Location: Romania
- Years active: 1998–present
- Founders: Kristal Glam Club
- Website: Sunwaves

Sunrise & Kristal Club are the organizers of the electronic music festival Sunwaves. It is a biannual festival that takes place on the beach, in Mamaia, Romania. The first edition was in 2007.

== See also ==
- List of electronic music festivals
