= Fabric 63 =

Compilation album by Levon Vincent
- Released: April 23, 2012
- Genres: Deep house; techno
- Length: 74:06
- Label: Fabric
- Producer: Levon Vincent

Fabric chronology
| Fabric 62 (2012) | Fabric 63 (2012) | Fabric 64 (2012) |

Professional ratings
Review scores
| Source | Rating |
|---|---|
| Resident Advisor | 4.5/5 stars |
| AllMusic | 4.5/5 stars |
| XLR8R | 8.5/10 |

Fabric 63 is a 2012 DJ mix compilation album by Levon Vincent. The album was released as part of the Fabric Mix Series.

== Track listing ==
| No. | Title | Artist | Length |
|---|---|---|---|
| 1. | "Earth Calls" | Joey Anderson | 5:19 |
| 2. | "Blaze (Do Dah Dab mix)" | DJ Jus-Ed | 5:28 |
| 3. | "Intrinsic Motivation" | JM de Frias | 4:42 |
| 4. | "Stereo Systems" | Levon Vincent | 3:58 |
| 5. | "Polar Bear" | Levon Vincent | 2:56 |
| 6. | "Times Like This" | DJ Qu | 5:18 |
| 7. | "Fear" | Levon Vincent | 8:19 |
| 8. | "Double-Jointed Sex Freak II" | Levon Vincent | 5:45 |
| 9. | "Hydrine" | Joey Anderson | 4:16 |
| 10. | "Tyson" | Anthony Parasole | 3:30 |
| 11. | "The End" | Levon Vincent | 5:46 |
| 12. | "Blacklight" | Black Jazz Consortium | 4:01 |
| 13. | "Early Reflections" | Levon Vincent | 4:27 |
| 14. | "Rainstorm II" | Levon Vincent | 6:40 |
| 15. | "Far Away (Atmospheric Pass)" | Black Jazz Consortium | 3:41 |
