= FabricLive.46 =

Compilation album by LTJ Bukem
- Released: June 2009
- Genre: Drum and bass
- Label: Fabric
- Producer: LTJ Bukem

LTJ Bukem chronology
| Some Blue Notes Of Drum 'N Bass (2004) | FabricLive.46 (2009) |

FabricLive chronology
| FabricLive.45 (2009) | FabricLive.46 (2009) | FabricLive.47 (2009) |

Professional ratings
Review scores
| Source | Rating |
|---|---|
| AllMusic | 3.5/5 stars |

FabricLive.46 is a 2009 album by LTJ Bukem. The album was released as part of the FabricLive Mix Series.

== Track listing ==
1. Greg Packer - "People's Music" (Good Looking)
2. Tidal - "Impressions" (Good Looking)
3. Furney - "Eerie Indiana" (Spacefunk Records)
4. Villem - "Inflated Tear" (Madcap's Remix)" (Good Looking)
5. Paul SG ft. Eros - "Forever" (Good Looking)
6. Paul SG ft. Caine - "Lay Down" (Solful Music)
7. Paul SG ft. Andy Sim - "Sweet and Fresh" (Solful Music)
8. Locksmith - "2 Minds" (Good Looking)
9. Specific - "Time" (Good Looking)
10. Furney - "Jambaleno" (Good Looking)
11. Phatplayaz - "Fact of the Unknown" (Good Looking)
12. Furney - "Rhodeo Drive" (Spacefunk Records)
13. Eveson - "Kodama" (Good Looking)
14. Furney - "Fearz" (Spacefunk Records)
15. Tayla - "Turn It Around" (Good Looking)
16. Locksmith - "I'm Not Where You Are" (Good Looking)
17. Furney - "Rhodes for D" (Good Looking)
18. Syncopix - "So in Need" (Good Looking)
