= FabricLive.04 =

Compilation album by Deadly Avenger
- Released: June 4, 2002
- Genre: Electronic music
- Length: 1:03:38
- Label: Fabric
- Producer: Deadly Avenger

Deadly Avenger chronology
Deep Red (2002)	FabricLive.04 (2002)

FabricLive chronology
FabricLive.03 (2002)	FabricLive.04 (2002)	FabricLive.05 (2002)

Professional ratings
Review scores
Source	Rating
Allmusic	3/5 stars
Resident Advisor	3.5/5 stars

FabricLive.04 is a DJ mix compilation album by Deadly Avenger, as part of the FabricLive Mix Series.

== Track listing ==
No.	Title	Length
1.	"We Took Pelham"	2:55
2.	"Megadeath" (featuring DJ LBR)	4:29
3.	"Live at the Capri"	3:46
4.	"Franklinz 2000" (featuring The Crooklyn Clan)	4:17
5.	"Put Em' Up" (featuring Frank Delour)	3:10
6.	"The G.O.A.T." (featuring LL Cool J)	3:53
7.	"Make Some Noise" (featuring DJ LBR)	2:10
8.	"Let Me Clear My Funk" (featuring DJ LBR)	2:36
9.	"Dance Across the Floor" (featuring Jimmy "Bo" Horne)	1:47
10.	"Caipirinha" (featuring Ceasefire)	5:43
11.	"I Believe in Miracles" (featuring The Jackson Sisters)	4:13
12.	"Hit the Floor" (featuring Dynamo Productions)	2:28
13.	"Midnight Method" (featuring The Nextmen)	4:12
14.	"Cross the Track" (featuring Maceo and the Macks)	3:08
15.	"Crowd Motivator" (featuring DJ Ace)	2:26
16.	"Let's Get Ill" (featuring The Crooklyn Clan)	3:00
17.	"Crowd Motivator" (featuring DJ Ace)	2:02
18.	"I Want You Back" (featuring The Jackson 5)	2:46
19.	"Let Me Know" (featuring DJ Aphrodite)	2:25
20.	"Handz Across the Water Mix" (featuring Neil Petricone)	2:12
