= Fabric 34 =

Compilation album by Ellen Allien
- Released: May 18, 2007
- Genre: Electronic
- Length: 70:27
- Label: Fabric
- Producer: Ellen Allien

Fabric Mix Series chronology
Fabric 33 (2007)	Fabric 34 (2007)	Fabric 35 (2007)

Professional ratings
Review scores
Source	Rating
About.com	5/5 stars
Allmusic	3.5/5 stars
JIVE	4.5/5 stars
Pitchfork Media	(7.9/10)
PopMatters	8/10 stars
Resident Advisor	3.5/5 stars

Fabric 34 is a DJ mix compilation album by Ellen Allien, as part of the Fabric Mix Series.

== Track listing ==
1. Schubert - S1 (Don't Believe the Chord - Pop Hype) - Statik
2. Larry Heard Presents Mr. White - The Sun Can’t Compare (Long Version) - Alleviated
3. Estroe - Driven (Jamie Jones' Pacific Mix) - Connaisseur Superieur
4. Damián Schwartz - Tú Y Yo (Peros Nos Volvemos A Levantar) (Pilas Remix) - Mupa
5. Don Williams - Orderly Kaos - a.r.t.less
6. Melodyboy 2000 - Sound Stealer - Futuro
7. Artificial Latvamäki - It Is Not Now Either - Mezzotinto
8. Cobblestone Jazz - India in Me - Wagon Repair
9. Roman Flügel - Mutter - Klang
10. Ø - Aaltovaihe - Säkhö
11. Thom Yorke - Harrowdown Hill - XL
12. Ellen Allien - Just a Woman - Bpitch Control
13. Ben Klock - Journey - Bpitch Control
14. Heartthrob - Baby Kate (Plastikman Remix) - M_nus
15. Apparat - Arcadia - Random Noize
