= FabricLive.75 =

Compilation album by Elijah & Skilliam
- Released: 16 May 2014
- Genre: Grime
- Length: 1:01:17
- Label: Fabric

FabricLive chronology
FabricLive.74 (2014)	FabricLive.75 (2014)	FabricLive.76 (2014)

Professional ratings
Review scores
Source	Rating
Resident Advisor	4/5 stars
Pitchfork	(6.7/10)

FabricLive.75 is a DJ mix album by English DJ duo Elijah & Skilliam. The album was released as part of the FabricLive Mix Series.

== Track listing ==
No.	Title	Length
1.	"Intro" (featuring Royal T)	5:24
2.	"Killer" (featuring Terror Danjah, Four Tet)	5:09
3.	"Stone Island" (featuring Champion, Terror Danjah)	4:50
4.	"Hold On (VIP 3)" (featuring Flava D)	4:52
5.	"Venture" (featuring Lil Silva)	5:17
6.	"Sickman" (featuring D Double E)	3:23
7.	"Mufasa" (featuring Champion, Royal T)	4:28
8.	"Good Stay Bad" (featuring Swindle)	3:10
9.	"I Know You Want Me" (featuring Royal T)	5:13
10.	"Roll Call" (featuring P-Money)	3:18
11.	"H-Street" (featuring Kowton)	4:37
12.	"Jack Up the Tune" (featuring JME, Preditah)	3:42
13.	"666 Sauna" (featuring Darq E Freaker)	4:35
14.	"Disturbed 2.0" (featuring P. Jam)	6:10
15.	"Into Mist" (featuring Murlo)	5:00
16.	"Hit Him" (featuring Footsie)	3:15
17.	"Integrity" (featuring JME)	3:39
18.	"Let it Be Known" (featuring 040)	4:13
19.	"Twinkle" (featuring Silkie, Swindle)	4:36
20.	"Born in the Cold" (featuring Andreena Mill, Wiley)	3:12
21.	"Keep it Cool" (featuring Kelela)	4:10
22.	"Two Faced" (featuring DJ Q)	3:25
23.	"Pull it Up" (featuring Alahna, Jme, Sir Spyro)	4:27
24.	"Home" (featuring Flava D)	4:13
25.	"Outro" (featuring Swindle)	4:55
