= Fabric 30 =

2006 mix album by Rub-N-Tug

Compilation album by Rub-N-Tug
- Released: September 2006
- Genre: Electronic music
- Length: 73:43
- Label: Fabric

Fabric Mix Series chronology
Fabric 29	Fabric 30	Fabric 31

Professional ratings
Review scores
Source	Rating
AllMusic	4/5 stars
JIVE	5/5 stars
Time Out NY	4/6 stars
XLR8R	(favorable)

Fabric 30 is a DJ mix compilation album by Rub-N-Tug, as part of the Fabric Mix Series.

== Track listing ==
1. Intro (0:15)
2. Claude VonStroke - Seven Deadly Strokes - Neuton (3:54)
3. Röyksopp - What Else Is There (The Emperor Machine Vocal Version) - Wall of Sound (2:08)
4. Jesse Rose - Evening Standard - Dubsided (3:52)
5. Curtis McClaine And On The House - Let's Get Busy - Trax (5:45)
6. Gary Martin - Turkish Tavern - Teknotika (4:17)
7. Sir Drew - Shemale (Black Strobe Remix) - Adrift (2:31)
8. Serge Santiago - Atto D'Amore (Dub) - Arcobaleno (6:41)
9. Dondolo - Dragon (Shit Robot 'Breathing Fire' Remix) - Tiny Sticks (5:08)
10. Slok - Lonely Child (Satoshi Tomiie 3D Remix Dub) - Saw Recordings (5:22)
11. Rufuss - No Exit - Qalomota (4:35)
12. Foolish & Sly - Come A Little Closer - Cynic (4:57)
13. Nemesi - L'Asteroide (Original Impact Mix) - Relish (3:40)
14. Force Of Nature - Blackmoon - Libyus (2:50)
15. Lifelike & Kris Menace - Discopolis - Defected (8:27)
16. Âme - Engoli - Sonar Kollektiv (4:01)
17. Mocky - Catch A Moment In Time (Ewan Pearson’s Memory Blissed Remix) - Fine (5:15)
