= FabricLive.74 =

Compilation album by Jack Beats
- Released: 17 March 2014
- Genre: Electronic
- Length: 1:50:10
- Label: Fabric

FabricLive chronology
FabricLive.73 (2014)	FabricLive.74 (2014)	FabricLive.75 (2014)

Jack Beats chronology
Jack Beats Remixed Vol. 2 EP (2013)	FabricLive.74 (2014)	Beatbox (2014)

FabricLive.74 is a DJ mix album by English electronic music duo Jack Beats. The album was released as part of the FabricLive Mix Series.

== Track listing ==
No.	Title	Length
1.	"Beatbox"	3:47
2.	"Requiem (Life And Death)" (featuring Ten Walls)	7:30
3.	"Street Walker" (featuring Duke Dumont)	5:57
4.	"Holding You Tight" (featuring Sure Thing)	3:28
5.	"Careless" (featuring Dusky)	6:31
6.	"Landline" (featuring A-Trak, GTA)	4:56
7.	"Trap Shit V13" (featuring UZ)	5:07
8.	"J.A.W.S." (featuring Lxury)	6:01
9.	"Doing It" (featuring Nulight, AC Slater, DJ Taiki)	5:22
10.	"Round The Clock" (featuring P-Money)	4:33
11.	"Booty Bounce" (featuring DJ Funk, GTA)	5:16
12.	"Knock You Down"	4:35
13.	"The Ill Shit"	2:40
14.	"Ah Yeah!" (featuring Will Sparks)	3:39
15.	"Hyper Reality" (featuring Panteros666)	4:31
16.	"Let's Get Hot" (featuring Breach)	5:44
17.	"Just A Beat"	4:05
18.	"Free" (featuring Rudimental, Emeli Sandé)	5:20
19.	"Higher" (featuring Destructo)	4:52
20.	"Daydreamer" (featuring Example, Flux Pavilion)	5:17
21.	"Dazed" (featuring Feed Me)	6:41
22.	"Emmanuel" (featuring Basecamp)	4:18
