= FabricLive.05 =

Compilation album by Howie B
- Released: 13 August 2002
- Genre: Electronic
- Length: 1:13:15
- Label: Fabric
- Producer: Howie B

Howie B chronology
Another Late Night: Howie B (2001)	FabricLive.05 (2002)	Last Bingo in Paris (2004)

FabricLive chronology
FabricLive.04 (2002)	FabricLive.05 (2002)	FabricLive.06 (2002)

Professional ratings
Review scores
Source	Rating
Allmusic	3/5 stars
Resident Advisor	4.5/5 stars

FabricLive.05 is a DJ mix compilation album by Howie B, as part of the FabricLive Mix Series.

== Track listing ==
No.	Title	Length
1.	"Fish"	4:54
2.	"Neuroscan"	6:32
3.	"The Word /The Human Animal" (featuring Lydia Lunch and Dope Smugglaz)	6:09
4.	"Daydream in Blue" (featuring I Monster)	5:57
5.	"Music Takes You" (featuring Blame)	4:08
6.	"Cherry Lips" (by Garbage)	7:21
7.	"Donuts and Coffee" (featuring Bombing F)	6:56
8.	"Beautiful /Future Abuse" (featuring Lemonescent)	11:37
9.	"Clone the Clowns"	5:10
10.	"Hindoo's and Hairdoo's" (featuring Big Hair)	4:51
11.	"Beyond"	5:35
12.	"Foundation Stepper" (featuring Prince Far I)	4:05
