= FabricLive.80 =

Compilation album by Mumdance
- Released: March 16, 2015
- Genre: Weightless, grime, hardcore
- Label: Fabric

FabricLive chronology
FabricLive.79 (2015)	FabricLive.80 (2015)	FabricLive.81 (2015)

Mumdance chronology
FabricLive.80 (2015)	Proto (2015)

Professional ratings
Review scores
Source	Rating
Resident Advisor	3.5/5 stars

FabricLive.80 is a 2015 DJ mix album by the electronic artist Mumdance. The album was released in 2015 as part of the FabricLive Mix Series.

== Track listing ==
No.	Title	Length
1.	"Travels In the Universe of the Soul" (featuring Shapednoise)
2.	"Ninety-Nine (Remix)" (featuring @C)
3.	"Untitled" (featuring Jefre Cantu-Ledesma)
4.	"Branch Light" (featuring Fis)
5.	"Fabrication II" (featuring Sculpture)
6.	"Testsix (Toneappella)" (featuring Sweet Exorcist)
7.	"Cemetery Seance" (featuring Mite)
8.	"Glass" (featuring Logos)
9.	"Water Bomb" (featuring Pinch)
10.	"Doff (VIP)" (featuring Untold)
11.	"No Signal" (featuring Acre)
12.	"Hall of Mirrors" (featuring Logos)
13.	"In Reverse PIV" (featuring Logos)
14.	"Cold" (featuring Logos)
15.	"Outerzone" (featuring Helm)
16.	"Piano In the Corner of the Room" (featuring Wanda Group)
17.	"Rushed" (featuring Strict Face)
18.	"Inside the Catacomb" (featuring Logos / Rabit)
19.	"Choong (Devil Mix)" (featuring Inkke)
20.	"1 Sec (Fabriclive VIP)" (featuring Novelist)
21.	"Take Time" (featuring Riko Dan)
22.	"Coalition" (featuring Eastwood / Oddz)
23.	"Kamikaze" (featuring Jon E. Cash)
24.	"Blow Out, Pt. II" (featuring Bass Selective)
25.	"In Complete Darkness" (featuring Fat Controller)
26.	"Six Days" (featuring Cru-L-T / Jimmy J)
27.	"The Journey, Pt. 1" (featuring Ramos / Supreme)
