= FabricLive.71 =

Compilation album by DJ EZ
- Released: 24 September 2013
- Genre: Electronic
- Length: 1:15:17
- Label: Fabric

FabricLive chronology
FabricLive.70 (2013)	FabricLive.71 (2013)	FabricLive.72 (2013)

DJ EZ chronology
Ministry of Sound: The Essential Garage Collection (2009)	FabricLive.71 (2013)

Professional ratings
Review scores
Source	Rating
Resident Advisor	4/5 stars

FabricLive.71 is a DJ mix album by English DJ, DJ EZ. The album was released as part of the FabricLive Mix Series.

== Track listing ==
No.	Title	Length
1.	"EZ Intro 7"	1:59
2.	"No I Turn You On (Disclosure Remix)" (featuring Artful Dodger, Zoe Kypri)	3:17
3.	"Relax" (featuring Moony)	1:52
4.	"All I Do (Bump & Flex Dance Floor Dub)" (featuring Clepto-Maniacs)	1:38
5.	"Hold On" (featuring Jammin)	1:38
6.	"Little Man (Exemen Works)" (featuring Sia)	2:06
7.	"The Beginning" (featuring Jook10)	0:56
8.	"Living Like I Do (Lil' Silva Remix)" (featuring SBTRKT, Sampha)	3:31
9.	"Kamikaze" (featuring Cause & Affect)	1:38
10.	"Pull It (Fabian Dubz Remix)" (featuring Shystie)	2:35
11.	"I Keep" (featuring N'n'G)	1:00
12.	"Hold On (SE22 Mix)" (featuring Colours, Stephen Emmanuel)	1:52
13.	"Reach" (featuring Woz)	1:52
14.	"Live" (featuring KCAT, The Mike Delinquent Project)	2:35
15.	"Destiny" (featuring Dem 2)	2:19
16.	"Let's Go Back" (featuring Majestic MC)	2:22
17.	"I Know You Want Me" (featuring Royal T)	1:52
18.	"Afrocentrism" (featuring Nativ)	2:07
19.	"Classified Bass" (featuring Classified, DJ Q)	2:07
20.	"Want You Back"	1:53
21.	"Javid Khan" (featuring Todd Edwards)	3:03
22.	"Messing Around (Wideboys Mix)" (featuring Once Waz Nice)	2:42
23.	"You & Me" (featuring Disclosure, Eliza Doolittle)	3:11
24.	"Something in Your Eyes" (featuring Ed Case, Shelley Nelson)	2:50
25.	"Dreams" (featuring Smokin Beats)	2:37
26.	"Control" (featuring Disclosure, Ria Ritchie)	2:37
27.	"The Good Old Days (Kerri Chandler Instrumental)" (featuring Issac Christopher)	1:55
28.	"God Made Me Phunky" (featuring The MD X-Spress)	1:55
29.	"Social Experiment" (featuring Cause & Affect)	1:12
30.	"Mellow Works" (featuring R.I.P. Productions)	2:10
31.	"Sincere" (featuring MJ Cole)	3:22
32.	"Vultures (MJ Cole Remix)" (featuring Jess Mills)	6:34
