= Oneman =

Steven Bishop (born 1986), known professionally as Oneman, is a DJ and producer from Streatham, London. His background is in pirate radio and he is a regular DJ on Rinse FM.

Oneman's DJ sets typically blend dubstep, hip hop, grime, UK funky and UK garage. He has released two mix albums with Fabriclive and Rinse FM as well as three self-released Solitaire mixtapes, one of which with Red Bull Studios.

== Career ==
His love of music developed as a teenager in South London while listening to local pirate stations such as Rinse FM. His mother worked at London Records when he was growing up, and he subsequently gained work experience at their offshoot label Public Demand Records and later at Warner Bros. Records. He points to the DMZ clubnights organised by Digital Mystikz as a key influence in becoming a DJ.

In 2006, he was asked to join Rinse FM, and has become a "figure synonymous with the Rinse FM station and the brand and subculture surrounding it". He celebrated hosting his 400th show on the radio station on 17 May 2016 with a special 4-hour set.

In 2008, Oneman was the first DJ to appear on the Mary Anne Hobbs BBC Radio 1 show without releasing a record, as part of her Generation Bass series. In 2010, Oneman launched a record label, 502 Recordings. It has released productions by Teeth, Jay Weed, Fis-T, and Destro. FACT TV featured an interview with DJ Oneman and Toddla T in which the artists discussed Notting Hill Carnival 2012.

In December 2011, Oneman collaborated with DJs Jon Rust, DJ Reecha and MC ASBO to form Standard Place, a regular underground party playing sets for Boiler Room and Fabric. He has performed live at festivals such as Bestival 2012, Kraków's 2012 Unsound Festival. He supported SBTRKT at Shepherds Bush Empire in London. Ticketmaster users gave the concert a near 5 star rating. In a review by Give Pop a Chance!, he was an asset to the line up; "Luckily Oneman has some big bassy tunes up his sleeve that keep an impatient crowd dancing as the stage is prepared for SBTRKT." In February and March 2013, Oneman toured the UK and Europe to celebrate his mixtape release Solitaire. Oneman completed his first US tour with a string of North America dates throughout March 2013. The tour included sets at SXSW along with Jackmaster, Wildarms and Bremnar on the Fader Fort stage. He toured and played festivals in Europe in the spring and summer 2013, including at O2 Oxford, The Pleasure Principle, Field Day, Bugged Out Weekender, and Sonar Festival where he was dubbed one of FACT magazines' must-see acts. In April 2014, Oneman announced he would be touring North America in May 2014 alongside LA producer, DJ and Body High label co-founder Jerome LOL. In April 2016, it was announced that Oneman and My Nu Leng would be touring across Europe, paying back to back at a string of festivals including, Distortion, Reading & Leeds and Bestival.

In 2014, Oneman and fellow DJ Jackmaster came together to collaborate on a new live music project under the name Can U Dance, a live DJ venture featuring back to back sets between the two DJs. In 2014, they played their new show across Europe and joined the summer festival circuit at Field Day, Parklife, Exit, Dour, Dekmantel and Dimensions festivals. Can U Dance also recorded a BBC Radio 1 Essential Mix live at Glastonbury Festival 2014.

In June 2016, it was announced that Oneman would be the summer resident DJ for London nightclub XOYO. The 13-week residency saw the DJ play and curate every Friday at the club from July to September 2016, joined by guests such as Gilles Peterson, Benji B, Wiley, Newham Generals, Lunice, Casisdead, Mount Kimbie and Skream.

== Releases ==
In 2010, Oneman produced the Rinse:11 mix album, released by Rinse FM. FACT magazine journalist Tom Lea stated in his review of the album that "Oneman, in his own, understated way, changed the face of British dance music."

Oneman's mix album FabricLive.64 in 2012 received critical response from Pitchfork Media and Resident Advisor.

Pitchfork Media rated FabricLive.64 an 8.0 and stated that, "Applauding FabricLive.64 for its potential didacticism, though, would be unjustly ignoring just how much fun it is to listen to, how easily and pleasantly it moves, how Steve Bishop is playing to the rafters and pulling out all the stops when his name alone represents a seal of approval for many". The album was reviewed by Resident Advisor's Andrew Ryce in August 2012, "Those moments of creative synthesis are Fabriclive 64's saving grace—Oneman might not be a flashy jock, but he's a unique one. He has a way of pulling off the unconventional every single time, whether it's long, extended blends that sound like they shouldn't work or a hard pan from 2010 to 1998". Fabric went on to applaud Oneman by stating, "There are DJs that are heavily tied to styles, people who go on to become figures synonymous with a certain sound or a particular approach to mixing; and then there are DJ’s DJs – a different breed of people who manage to make the whole process of blending records from disparate genres look (and sound) seamless. Often, it’s not just about beat matching perfectly, it’s as much about capturing a mood and evolving it through your record selections as it is locking on to a consistent rhythm and that’s something that Streatham bred DJ, Steve Bishop, has proven himself to be mightily adept at over the years".

== Personal life ==
In May 2018, Bishop publicly opened up about his experiences of Xanax abuse. In an interview with ITV News, he stated that he had used the drug for three years before he entered rehabilitation in 2017. His dependency on the drug and counterfeit alternatives led to a threat to his DJing career.

== Discography ==
=== Mix albums ===
- Rinse:11 (2010)
- FabricLive.64 (2012)
- Solitaire Vol.1 (2013)
- Remixes & Edits (2013)
- Solitaire Vol. 2 (2013)
- Solitaire Vol. 3 (2014)

=== Promo mixes ===
- FACT Mix 239: Jamie XX & Oneman (2011)
- LuckyMe – Ninety Three Mixtape (2011)

=== Remixes ===
- "You Took Your Time" by Mount Kimbie featuring King Krule, with an additional verse from Jeremiah Jae.
