= FabricLive.81 =

Compilation album by Monki
- Released: 18 May 2015
- Genre: Electronic
- Label: Fabric

FabricLive chronology
FabricLive.80 (2015)	FabricLive.81 (2015)	FabricLive.82 (2015)

Professional ratings
Review scores
Source	Rating
Resident Advisor	3.5/5 stars

FabricLive.81 is a 2015 DJ mix album by Monki. The album was released as part of the FabricLive Mix Series.

== Track listing ==
1. FPI Project - Rich In Paradise (Going Back To My Roots)
2. Arma - Vex
3. Deapmash & Raito - Stop (Strip Steve Remix)
4. DJ Dealer & Groove Junkies feat. Chezere - My Day Has Come (DJ Dealer Prime Time Vocal)
5. DJ Haus - I Can Feel It
6. Bot & Tony Quattro - Guess Who
7. Doctor Jeep feat. TT The Artist - Bang
8. Sly One - Cowbell
9. Melé - Angorra + Additional vocals by Chimpo
10. DJ Spen presents DJ Technic - Gabryelle
11. FCL - It's You (San Soda’s Panorama Bar Acca Version) + Adesse Versions - Pride (Dub)
12. Eddie Mercury - A Lo Mejor
13. Floorplan - Baby, Baby
14. DJ Haus - Helta Skelta
15. Kalyde - Infected Ear
16. Melé and Mak & Pasteman - Do You Rex
17. Mella Dee - Rude & Deadly
18. Callahan - Fallacy
19. Tony Quattro - Zulu Carnival
20. Gage - Telo (Sudanim Remix) + Additional vocals by Slick Don
21. Danny Daze & 214 - Las Caderas
22. Golden Girls - Kinetic (Frank De Wulf Remix)
