= Cameron Leslie (businessman) =

Nightclub manager

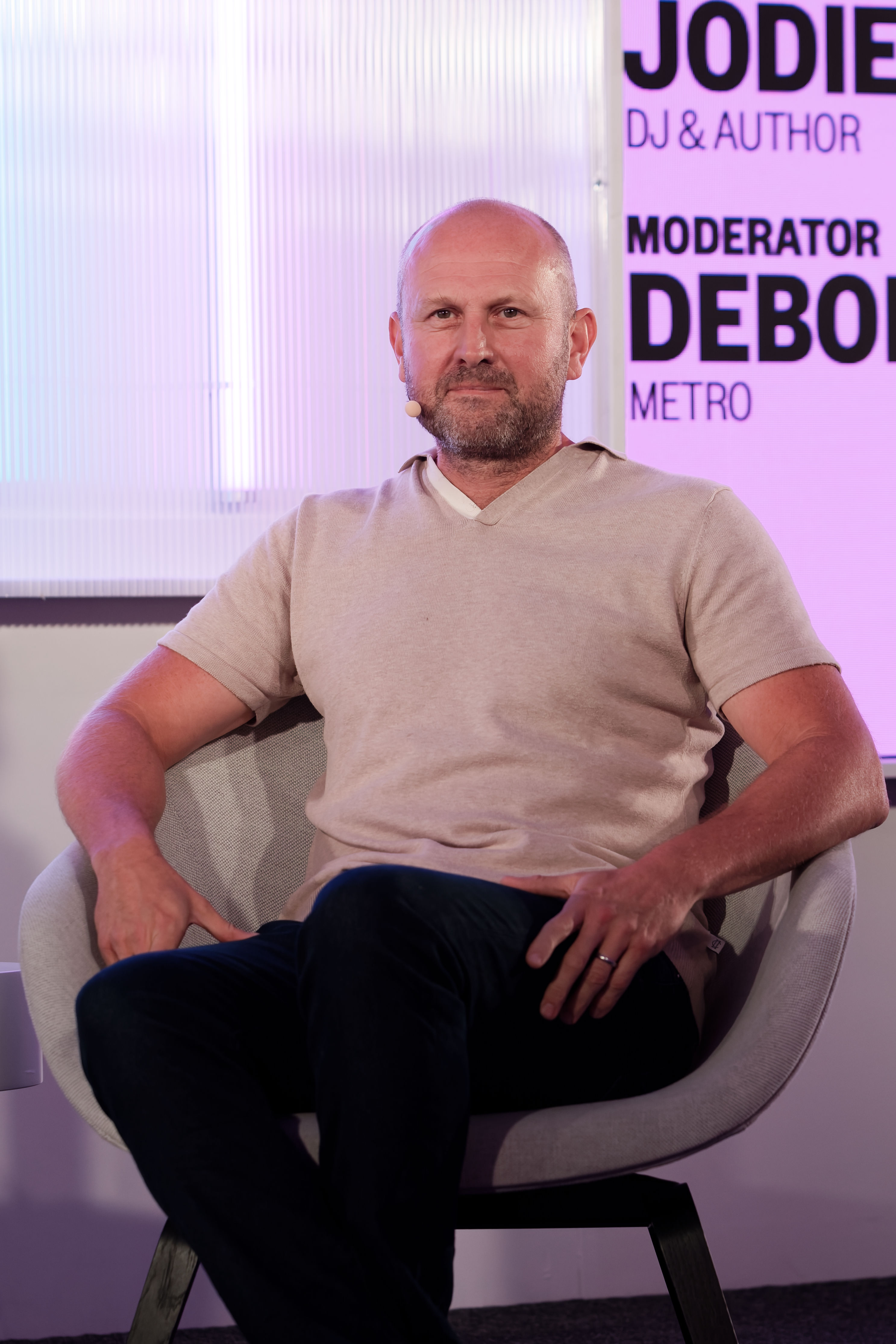
Cameron Leslie at SXSW London 2026

Cameron Frank Leslie (born May 1973) is a London nightclub manager. He and Keith Reilly operate the nightclub Fabric, which they co-founded in 1999.

== Career ==
Leslie has a degree in International Hospitality Management. He worked in five-star hotels and then became a hospitality and leisure consultant with Deloitte.

In 1999, he started the nightclub Fabric with Keith Reilly. Leslie met Reilly when he, while working at Deloitte as a lending officer, helped Reilly with financing for a night club. As a result of them getting along so well, they partnered up.

In 2008 they opened a second club, Matter, at the O_{2}, which closed in summer 2010.

In September 2016, Leslie appeared in front of the licensing board to defend Fabric's way of handling drugs and drug dealers at their club.
