= Jack Beats =

English electronic-music musician

- Origin: London, England
- Genres: Fidget house, electro house, dubstep, deep house
- Years active: 2007–present
- Labels: Cheap Thrills; Deconstruction; Owsla; Rinse; Night Bass
- Members: Ben Geffin (Beni G)
- Past members: Niall Dailly (Plus One)

Jack Beats are an English electronic music project from London, originally formed in 2007 by DJ Plus One (from the Scratch Perverts) and Beni G (from the Mixologists), both of whom are multiple DJ champions and award-winning DJs. The Jack Beats sound is known for wobbly basslines, big breakdowns and edgy a capellas which are cut, copied, and pasted together.

== History ==
Jack Beats has been heavily championed on the electro scene by British disc jockeys Kissy Sell Out and Hervé. They performed regularly at club nights throughout the world, as well as at many popular festivals, including Coachella, Fuji Rock Festival, Glastonbury, EDC, and Sónar. Additionally, they have released music on labels including Owsla, Rinse, Night Bass, and Columbia Records.

=== Members ===
Beni G (Ben Geffin) is a British DJ. He is one half of the Mixologists.

DJ Plus One (Niall Dailly) is a Scottish DJ. He won the DMC World DJ Championships in 2001. He is a former DJ on London's Kiss radio station. Dailly tours regularly with the Scratch Perverts.

Starting in 2015, Jack Beats no longer performed as a duo, with Dially no longer present during performances. Geffin would frequently have collaborators on stage, such as AC Slater (head of the Night Bass label that Jack Beats frequently released on) or Dillon Nathaniel. Additionally, new Jack Beats music appears to be produced by only one member of the duo (likely Geffin, as other first-person social posts reference him exclusively). No formal announcement regarding why has been made by either member.

== Discography ==
=== Extended plays ===
- U.F.O. EP (2009)
- Careless (2012)
- Somebody to Love (2012)
- Jack Beats Remixed Vol. I (2013)
- Jack Beats Remixed Vol. II (2013)
- Beatbox (2014)
- Work It EP (2016)
- Modulate EP (2017)
- Vibrate (2018)
- The Remedy EP (2019)
- Catch the Spirit EP (2019)
- Paradise EP (2020)

=== Singles ===
Year	Title	Label
2006	"Golddigga" (vs. Deekline and Wizard)	Rat Records
2007	"Keep It Ringing" (vs. Fallacy)	Ahead of the Game
2009	"What" (vs. Dynamite MC)	Cheap Thrills Records
2010	"Revolution / Out of Body"	Cheap Thrills Records
2011	"All Night" (featuring John B)	Cheap Thrills Records
2011	"End of Love"	Deconstruction Records
2012	"You Should Know" (featuring Donae'o)	Deconstruction Records
2015	"One Love"	Owsla
2015	"Zone" (featuring Riko Dan)	Rinse
2019	"Mind Sensation" (vs. Dillon Nathaniel)	Dancing Astronaut

=== Compilations ===
Year	Album details
2014	FabricLive.74: Released: 17 May 2014; Label: Fabric; Formats: CD, digital download

=== Promotional songs ===
Year	Title	Release date	Notes
2011	"Make the People"	20 December 2011	Dubs for Clubs: Part 1
2012	"Deeper"	1 March 2012	Dubs for Clubs: Part 2
2016	"Cold"	18 February 2016	Dubs for Clubs: Part 3

=== Mixtapes ===
Year	Title	Release date
2012	Evolution	13 July 2012
2012	Progressions	24 October 2012

=== Mixes ===
Year	Title	Track(s) featured	Label
2009	Keep Watch Vol. XIV	–	Mishka
2010	Essential Mix	"Labyrinth", "U.F.O", "Get Down"	BBC Radio 1
2011	Bass-Bin Bombs!	"Revolution (VIP)"	Mixmag
2018	AC Slater & Jack Beats – CRSSD Mix	"Raise It Up"	Complex

=== Remixes ===
Year	Artist	Title
2007	Example	"I Don't Want To"
2007	Trip	"Who's That?"
2008	Boy 8-Bit	"Fogbank"
2008	The Black Ghosts	"I Want Nothing"
2008	Does It Offend You, Yeah?	"Epic Last Song"
2008	AC Slater	"Jack Got Jacked"
2008	Project Bassline	"Drop the Pressure"
2008	Leon Jean-Marie	"Bring It On"
2008	Deekline & Ed Solo	"Handz Up!"
2009	Lady Sovereign	"Got You Dancing"
2009	Kidda	"Feel Too Good"
2009	TC	"Where's My Money" (re-work of Caspa remix)
2009	TC	"Deep" (released under the name "Deeper")
2009	Kissy Sell Out	"This Kiss"
2009	Diplo and Blaqstarr	"Get Off"
2009	Hockey	"Song Away"
2009	Patrick Wolf	"Hard Times"
2009	Florence and the Machine	"Drumming Song"
2009	La Roux	"I'm Not Your Toy"
2009	Fake Blood	"Mars"
2009	Passion Pit	"Little Secrets"
2009	Scratch Perverts	"This Kiss"
2009	DJ Zinc	"Super Sharp Shooter"
2010	Big Boi	"Shutterbugg"
2011	Skream (featuring Sam Frank)	"Where You Should Be"
2011	Aloe Blacc	"Green Lights"
2011	Beyoncé	"Countdown"
2012	Flux Pavilion (featuring Example)	"Daydreamer"
2013	Major Lazer & Flux Pavilion	"Jah No Partial"
2013	A-Trak (featuring GTA)	"Landline"
2013	Foxes	"Beauty Queen"
2013	Example	"All the Wrong Places"
2013	Rudimental (featuring Emeli Sandé)	"Free"
2013	Brillz & Cory Enemy	"Pump the Beat"
2013	Jack Beats	"Knock You Down"
2014	Oliver Heldens (featuring Becky Hill)	"Gecko (Overdrive)"
2014	Danny Brown	"Smokin' & Drinkin'"
2014	DJ Fresh (featuring Ellie Goulding)	"Flashlight"
2014	Destructo (featuring Problem)	"Dare You 2 Move"
2014	Skrillex & Diplo (featuring G-Dragon and CL)	"Dirty Vibe"
2015	Tiga (featuring Pusha T)	"Bugatti" (Jack Beats 'Golden Veyron' Refix)
2015	Watermät, Becky Hill and TAI	"All My Love"
2015	Sigma and Diztortion (featuring Jacob Banks)	"Redemption"
2015	The Kooks	"Creatures of Habit"
