= DJ EZ =

British house DJ (born 1975)

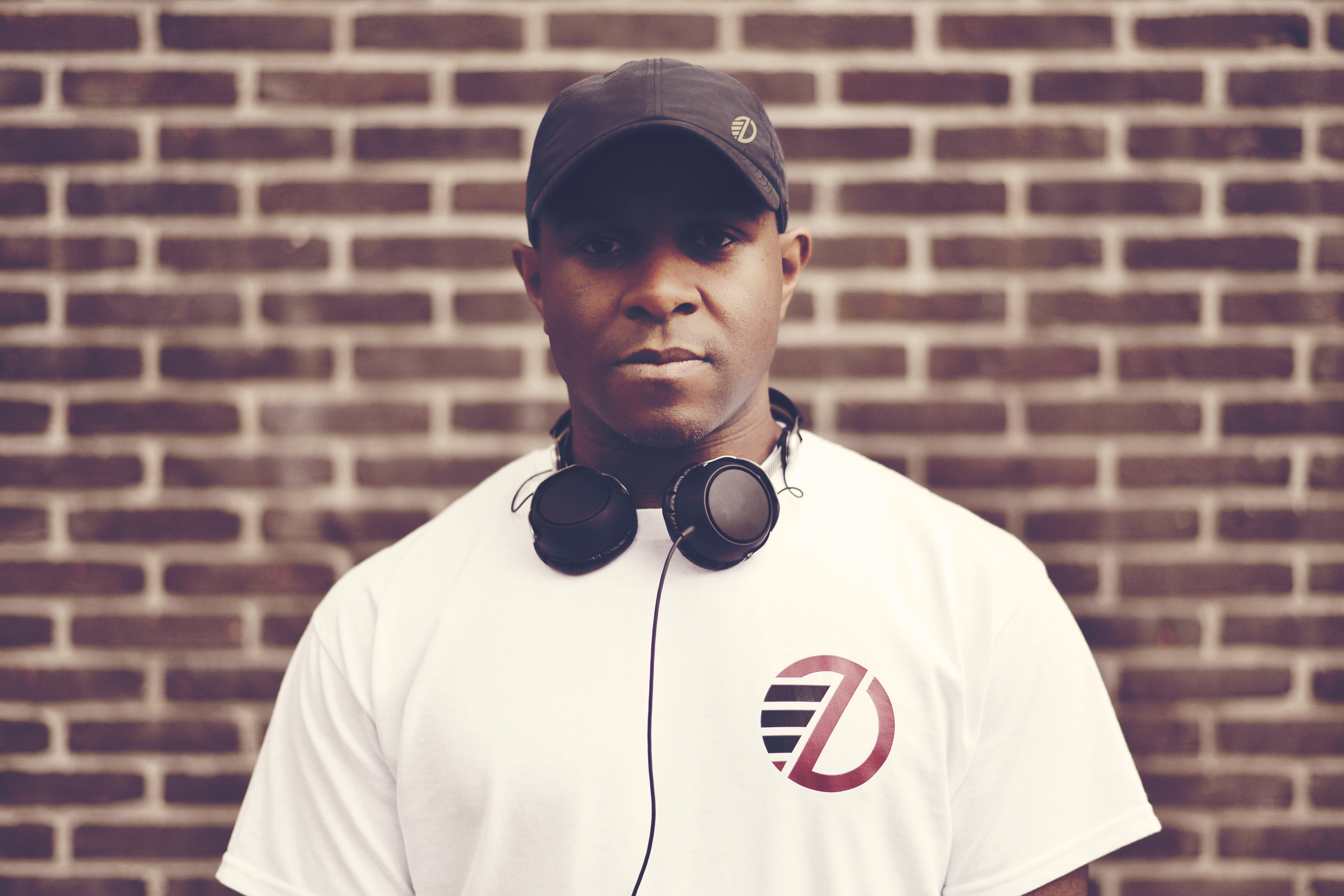
- DJ EZ in 2016

Background information
- Born: 28 November 1975 (age 50); London, England
- Genres: UK garage; house
- Occupations: DJ; producer
- Website: www.djez.com

Otis Roberts, better known by his stage name DJ EZ (pronounced "DJ ee zed"), is a British house DJ from Tottenham, North London. He was one of the earliest proponents of UK garage music, hosting a long-running Kiss 100 radio show and mixing the Pure Garage series of compilations.

== Biography ==
DJ EZ was born in London and raised in Tottenham, North London. His early discovery and love of house, hip hop and electro led to listening to pirate radio and recording early mixes in the hope to land a show on them. He is a supporter of Tottenham Hotspur F.C. He's teetotal.

=== Radio ===
DJ EZ first started DJing on the pirate radio station Dance 93FM, playing house music. At this time, he was known as Easy O. When the station was shut down, EZ set up his own station based in North London called Dimension FM, which was short-lived.

In 1994, EZ submitted a demo tape to then leading London house and garage pirate radio station Freek FM 101.8, which led to him hosting a 4-hour Saturday and Sunday mornings. It was also at this time that he changed his DJ name to EZ.

EZ's first appearances on commercial radio were to cover for Steve Jackson and Bobby & Steve's shows on Kiss 100. He was then asked to cover for Tuff Jam when they were unable to make their show, and in November 1999, this led to Kiss offering a permanent show on Tuesday mornings 2-4am. Shortly after, he was given a primetime show on Saturday nights 7-9pm called "Saturday Satisfaction", and then another show on Friday nights 10-11pm called "The Hour of Power". The Friday night show would then become called "Destination Weekend" from 10pm-12am, and in 2002, the Saturday show moved to 5-7pm.

From March to November 2008, EZ hosted a Saturday show called "The Bassline Mix" from 10-11pm across the Kiss Network. The show featured UK garage and bassline anthems in the mix.

From March to September 2014, EZ hosted a 3-hour Thursday night show from 9pm-12am. On 4 September 2014, he announced that his Kiss radio show had finally come to an end after 14 years on air.

EZ hosted Nuvolve Radio, a syndicated radio show that was heard in more than 30 countries that is named after the record label he founded in 2020 with his manager. On its 200th broadcast, it was put on hiatus.

=== Club career and awards ===
DJ EZ started his own weekly club night called Club Z at the Gass Club in Leicester Square.

As the UK garage scene broke mainstream, he has been synonymous with raves and nights such as Exposure, Twice As Nice, Garage Nation, Pure Silk, Sun City, Frisky and Club Sidewinder.

EZ has won many awards over the years, including 'Club DJ of the Year' at the 1998 Underground Garage Awards, 'Best DJ' at the 2000 and 2002 UK Garage Awards, and 'Best DJ', 'Best Old School DJ' and 'Best Radio Show' at the 2004 People's Choice Music Awards in London.

=== 24-hour charity set ===
On 10 February 2016, DJ EZ announced that he would be playing a 24-hour set, with all proceeds going to Cancer Research UK. This took place on 27–28 February 2016, and was live streamed on his website and Boiler Room.

=== Production ===
DJ EZ has released a number of his own productions, and is especially known for his remix of the B-15 Project track "Feels So Good".

He is also well known for compiling and mixing the long-running Pure Garage mixed compilation series.

== Discography ==
=== Singles and EPs ===
- 4 Track E.P. (Undercover Kutz, 1998)
- The Next Chapter EP (Z Records, 2002)
- One for All EP (One Recordings, 2002)
- "Just Turn It Up"/"The Overground" (One Recordings, 2003)

=== Remixes ===
- B-15 Project (featuring Shola Ama and Ms Dynamite) – "Feels So Good" (Relentless, 2001)

=== Mixes/compilations ===
- Pure Garage I/II/III (Warner, 2000)
- Pure Garage IV/V (Warner, 2001)
- Pure Garage Presents Bass Breaks & Beats (Warner, 2001)
- Pure Garage Platinum: The Very Best of... (Warner, 2002)
- Bass Breaks & Beats 2003 (Warner, 2002)
- Pure Garage Classics (Warner, 2003)
- Pure Garage Presents Four to the Floor (Warner, 2003)
- Pure Garage Presents the Main Room Sessions (Warner, 2005)
- Pure Garage Rewind Back to the Old Skool (Warner, 2007)
- Pure Garage Presents Pure Bassline (Warner, 2008)
- Ministry of Sound Presents DJ EZ – Essential Garage Collection (Ministry of Sound, 2009)
- FabricLive.71 (Fabric, 2013)
