= Matter (venue) =

London music venue

Coordinates: 51.5042°N 0.0032°E

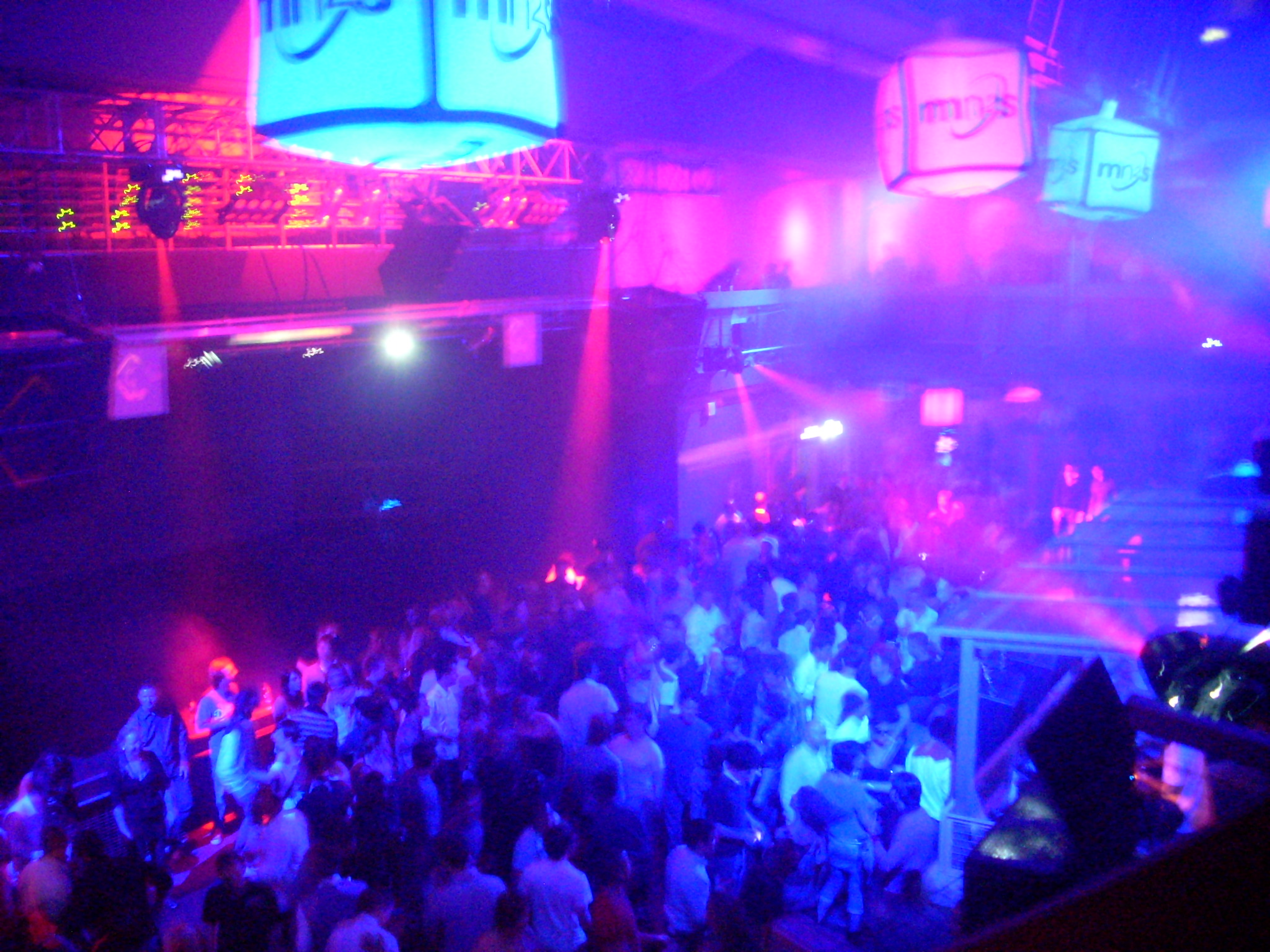
- The dance floor from the gallery
- Interactive map of Matter
- Location: The O_{2}, Greenwich, London, England
- Owner: Cameron Leslie; Keith Reilly
- Capacity: 2,600
- Type: Music venue and nightclub

Construction
- Opened: 2008
- Closed: 2017/2018 (as a nightclub)

Website
- www.matterlondon.com

Matter was a London music venue and nightclub that opened in September 2008.

== History ==
A 2,600 capacity live music venue and nightclub, it was the second project for owners Cameron Leslie and Keith Reilly, founders of the London club Fabric. Matter was the third venue to open at The O_{2} in south-east London.

Opened after three years of planning, Matter housed several visual installations, a sound system of some 200 speakers and a version of Fabric's 'BodySonic' dance floor, the 'BodyKinetic' floor.

Matter's music policy was set by London promoter Will Harold. It featured three bimonthly residencies, Hospitality (Hospital Records), RAMatter (RAM Records) and FWD>>/Rinse (Rinse FM).

Architect William Russell, of Pentagram, was commissioned to design the venue with partner Angus Hyland, who was responsible for the branding.

In May 2010 the venue announced it would close for the summer due to financial difficulties suffered as a consequence of continued delays with the TfL upgrade of the Jubilee Line.

The venue formerly housing Matter became a nightclub called Proud2, which opened in March 2011.

The date it ceased to be Proud2 and became Building Six was around August 2013.

After hosting many events for Hospitality, Breakin’ Science, Next Hype, EskimoDance and more, Building Six ceased its functionality as a nightclub around 2017/2018. Reasons for their closure are unknown as very little information is available online.

== See also ==
- List of electronic dance music venues
