= FabricLive.69 =

Compilation album by Fake Blood
- Released: May 20, 2013
- Recorded: 2013
- Genre: Electronic
- Length: 2:45:55
- Label: Fabric

Fake Blood chronology
Cells (2012)	FabricLive.69 (2013)

FabricLive.69 is a 2013 DJ mix album by Fake Blood. The album was released as part of the FabricLive Mix Series.

== Track list ==
No.	Title	Length
1.	"Lolita [Warehouse Mix]" (featuring Special Request)	7:38
2.	"Hypnotize" (featuring Brodinski)	4:34
3.	"Never Shaved" (featuring Rvbra)	3:25
4.	"Transistor Rhythm [Tanka Remix]" (featuring Drums of Death)	5:15
5.	"Realness" (featuring Madame)	5:31
6.	"Git Em [Zombies for Money Remix]" (featuring Steve Starks)	4:40
7.	"Aftermath" (featuring Nightmares on Wax)	3:23
8.	"Softcore" (featuring TWR72)	5:40
9.	"Swerve Ball" (featuring Mesa & King)	8:30
10.	"Impact" (featuring Mumbai Science)	4:45
11.	"Forgetfulness [Fake Blood Remix]" (featuring The Black Ghosts)	6:01
12.	"Night Terrors" (featuring Boy 8-Bit)	4:56
13.	"Jam the Mace" (featuring House Syndicate)	5:41
14.	"Painting My Fur" (featuring Sable Sheep)	6:45
15.	"Ima Read [Acapella]" (featuring Zebra Katz)	4:03
16.	"Dance to the Rhythm" (featuring The Untouchables)	5:44
17.	"Limbs" (featuring Nt89)	4:33
18.	"Don't Like to Do That" (featuring Cause & Affect)	5:36
19.	"War Drums" (featuring John Roman)	5:01
20.	"Onoria" (featuring Headz Up)	4:45
21.	"Toss Them Bodies" (featuring Attaque)	5:35
22.	"Vision" (featuring Hoshina Anniversary)	5:43
23.	"White Screen" (featuring French Fries)	6:36
24.	"One Hour" (featuring BOT)	3:47
25.	"Pop? [Fake Blood Remix]" (featuring Wretch 32)	5:05
26.	"Bring It Back" (featuring Happa)	7:29
27.	"Smoka [Douster Remix]" (featuring Slap in the Bass and Keith & Supabeatz)	4:29
28.	"Phantom" (featuring Funkystepz)	5:01
29.	"Court Jester [Eats Everything Remix]" (featuring Hot Pink Delorean)	7:12
30.	"Wait a Minute"	5:34
31.	"Mossing" (featuring Volta)	2:58
