= Craig Richards (DJ) =

- Born: 1966 (age 59–60); Bournemouth, England
- Genres: Tech house
- Occupations: Record producer, DJ, remixer

Craig Richards (born 1966, Bournemouth, England) is a British tech house DJ. He had been also known as part of Tyrant alongside Lee Burridge and, initially, Sasha.

Richards studied illustration at Saint Martins School of Art in London and is also a photographer and painter.

He collaborated with producer Howie B on a music, poetry, and visual art project called A Short Run.

== Discography ==
- Tyrant with Lee Burridge (Distinct'ive Breaks Records) 2000
- Fabric 01 (Radio Mix) (Promo) (Fabric) 2001
- Fabric 01 (Fabric) 2001
- Tyrant No Shoes, No Cake with Lee Burridge (2xCD) (Fabric) 2002
- Fabric 15: Tyrant (2xCD) (Fabric) 2004
- Fabric Dance De Lux CD: Craig Richards (Sinedín Music) 2005
- The Two Headed Monster with Transparent Sound (2xCD) (Orson Records) 2006
- Fabric 58: Craig Richards presents The Nothing Special (Fabric) 2011
