= Pure Garage =

Compilation album series

Pure Garage is a successful series of UK garage compilation albums. Nearly all of them are mixed by DJ EZ.

In January 2000, Warner Music chose Kiss 100's DJ EZ to mix Pure Garage, a new garage compilation CD. Pure Garage went on to receive platinum record sales and peaked at number 2 on the UK national compilation chart. The Pure Garage series is the most acknowledged and best-selling UK garage compilation series to date. The series has sold over 2 million records. Pure Garage Rewind Back to the Old Skool was released on 3 December 2007; after just two weeks on sale it had already earned itself gold disc status with over 100,000 copies sold. The Very Best of Pure Garage, released on 1 December 2008, is the first Pure Garage CD that was not mixed by DJ EZ, rather it was mixed by Matt "Jam" Lamont. In March 2011, a new compilation was released, named Pure Garage Anthems, mixed by Jason Kaye of Top Buzz.

== Pure Garage albums ==
- Pure Garage (2CD) - Released: 31 January 2000
- Pure Garage II (2CD) - Released: 3 July 2000
- Pure Garage III (2CD) - Released: 13 November 2000
- Pure Garage IV (2CD) - Released: 5 March 2001
- Pure Garage V (2CD) - Released: 29 October 2001
- Pure Garage Presents Bass Breaks & Beats (2CD) - Released: 3 December 2001
- Pure Garage Platinum: The Very Best of... (3CD) - Released: 9 December 2002
- Bass Breaks & Beats 2003 (2CD) - Released: 30 December 2002
- Pure Garage Classics (3CD) - Released: 24 November 2003
- Pure Garage Presents Four to the Floor (2CD) - Released: 29 December 2003
- Pure Garage Presents the Main Room Sessions (3CD) - Released: 16 May 2005
- Pure Garage Rewind Back to the Old Skool (4CD) - Released: 3 December 2007
- Pure Garage Presents Pure Bassline (3CD) - Released: 30 June 2008
- The Very Best of Pure Garage (4CD) - Released: 1 December 2008 (mixed by Matt "Jam" Lamont)
- Pure Garage Presents 100 Garage Classics (5CD) - Released: 28 December 2009
- Pure Garage Anthems (5CD) - Released: 28 March 2011 (mixed by Jason Kaye)
- Pure Garage Reload (3CD) - Released: 27 April 2015
- Pure Garage Wallop 2016 (3CD) - Released 19 May 2017 (mixed by FooR)

Some titles were also released on cassette and vinyl.
