= Maztek =

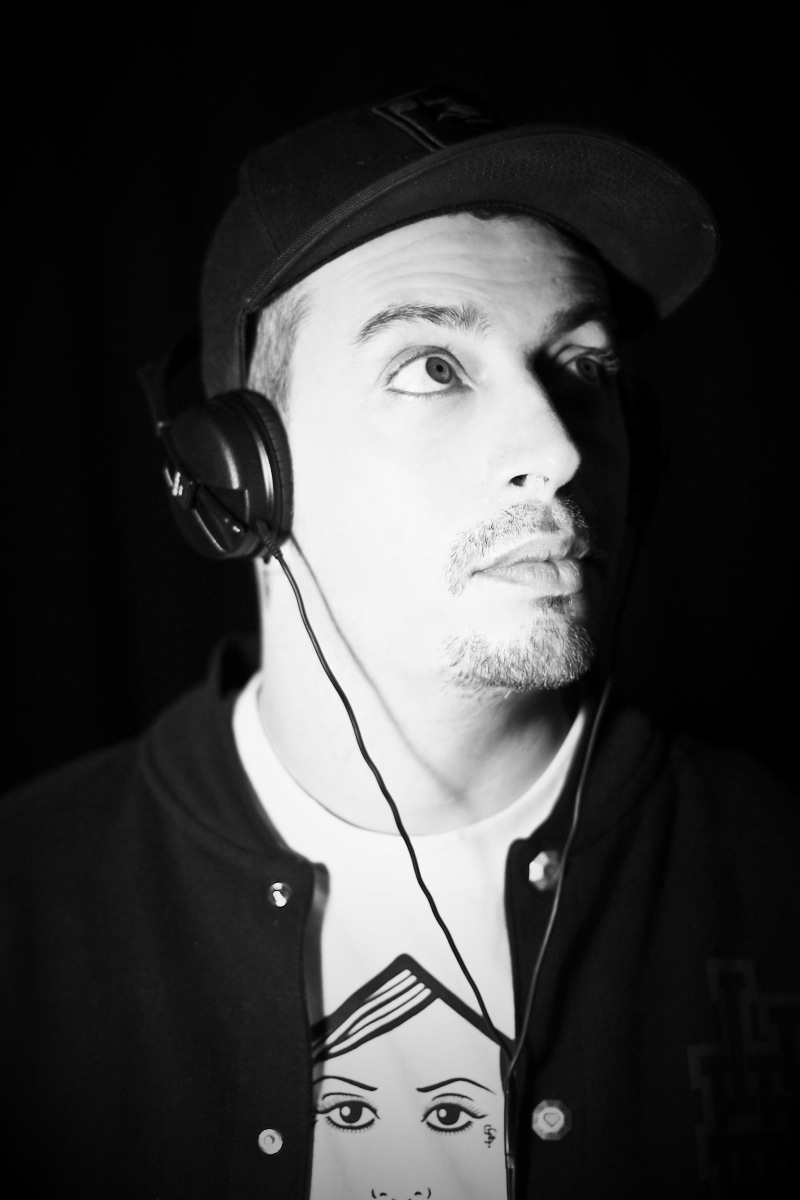
- Maztek Studio pic 2012

Background information
- Also known as: Maztek
- Born: Matteo Cavo; June 28, 1981 (age 44); Rome
- Origin: Italy
- Genres: Drum and bass, Neurofunk, Hip hop production, Computer music
- Occupation(s): Producer, musician
- Years active: 2004–present
- Labels: Renegade Hardware, Ram Records (UK), Hospital Records, Drum and Bass Arena, EMI
- Website: maztek.net

Maztek aka Matteo Cavo is a drum and bass neurofunk producer born in Rome, Italy. He began his career in 2004, after several releases on various independent record labels he was featured in 2012 on Renegade Hardware with his Single "Galactica/Odyssey".

In 2011, he became one of the official producers of Dope D.O.D., a hip hop crew based in the Netherlands, for which produces some beats one of which featuring Redman. In that same year he made a remix for an Italian band called Subsonica. The track was called "Il Diluvio (Maztek remix)" and was released by EMI.

In 2012 he signs his tune "Twang" on Hospital Records "Sick Music 3" followed by other Renegade Hardware various Artists releases and remixes.

In 2013 he signs his tune "Dizzy Step" on Program Records [Ram Records (UK)] Sub-label and "Hive Mind" on the Drum and Bass Arena Winter Selection 2013. In The same year he releases the "M Theory Ep" on Renegade Hardware.

== Discography ==
=== Albums ===
Album	Label
Warpath LP (2018)	0101 Music
Three Point Zero (2014)	Renegade Hardware
Unreleased Stuff (2013)	Not on Label (Maztek Self Released)

=== Singles and EPs ===
Single/EP	Label
Back From The EdgeFeat. State Of Mind (2017)	Eatbrain
Grinder EP (2016)	Eatbrain
Feedback Echo Feat. Current Value (2015)	Subsistenz
Unorthodox EP (2015)	C4C Recordings
Vodooo Feat. Zobie Cats (2015)	Eatbrain
SMMF Feat. BTK (2015) Dive Bomb EP	Virus Recordings
Three Point Zero Album Sampler (2014)	Renegade Hardware
Sinestesia, Blend LP part 2 (2014)	Dutty Audio
Hyper Reality (2014) Tales Of The Undead LP	Eatbrain
Multiverse Ft. Cern (2014)	Renegade Hardware
M Theory (2013)	Renegade Hardware
What We Bring / Caph (2013)	Dutty Audio
Limber EP (2013)	Renegade Hardware
Dizzy Step (2013)	Program
The Remixes (2012)	Icarus Audio
Maztek / Treo - Dogu / Machinist (2012)	Syndrome Audio
Maztek & Optiv - Quarks (2012)	Subculture Records
Galactica / Odyssey (2012)	Renegade Hardware
Maztek / Masheen - Crawler / Connection (2012)	Sinuous Records
Straight To Bad Ep (2011)	Icarus Audio
Crisis / Smashin' Brains (2009)	Abducted Records
Parasomnia Ep Pt. 2 - Connected / Zuma (2008)	Modulate Recordings

=== Compilations ===
Track	Label
Black Skies Feat. Gridlok and Verse (2017)	Let It Roll
Footprint (2015)	Drum & Bass Arena 2015
Hive Mind (2013)	Drum and Bass arena winter selection 2013
Twang (2012)	Sick Music 3 Hospital records
Crawler (2012)	Sinuous Lp 01

=== Production ===
Song	Label
Killing ‘Em (2015)	Virus Syndicate x Dope D.O.D. – Battle Royal
R The Future/Pack Leader (2014)	Virus Syndicate – The Swarm
Millennium Falcon, Black Rain and Groove feat Redman (rapper) (2013)	Dope D.O.D. - Da Roach
Brutality (2011)	Dope D.O.D. The Evil Ep
