= Lee Burridge =

British DJ and producer

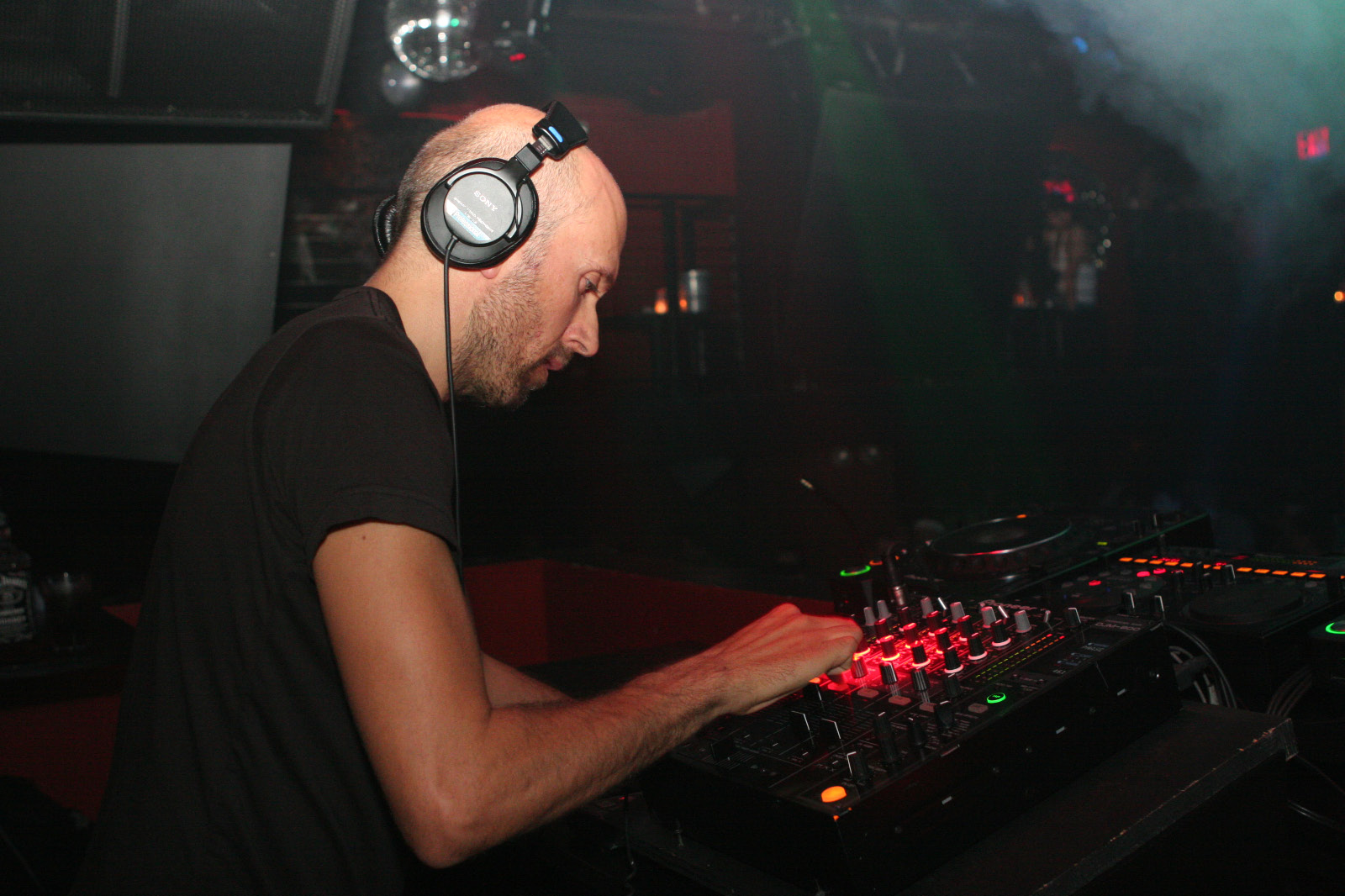
- Burridge at a performance at Pacha, NYC

Background information
- Born: November 1968 (age 57); Eype, Dorset, England
- Genres: Deep house Electronic Dance Music; Minimal; Breakbeat
- Occupations: Disc jockey record producer a&r
- Instrument: Turntables
- Years active: 1984–present
- Labels: All Day I Dream; TrybesOf; Get Weird

Lee Burridge (born November 1968) is a British DJ and producer who was influential in the underground club scene in Hong Kong in the 1990s, where he also helped established the nightclub Neptune's.

Burridge later became a member of England's Tyrant Soundsystem, along with DJs Craig Richards and Sasha, and he has regularly performed at Burning Man. In 2011, he began the All Day I Dream imprint, which led to a touring festival. He founded the off-shoot record label All Day I Dream in Waves in 2021.

== Biography ==
=== Early career (1985–1990) ===
Lee Burridge's DJ career began in the tourist village of Eype in the county of Dorset on 26 December 1983. He played for the first time at The New Inn, a bar owned and run by his parents. Shortly thereafter, with the help of his father, Burridge started his own mobile DJ operation, "Cutz" and spent the next few years traveling the surrounding countryside villages and towns, playing weddings, birthday parties, and even the occasional funeral.

Working as a mobile DJ led to a seasonal opportunity at a local holiday resort. Soon after that, Burridge began performing every weekend at the local town's nightclub, where he played mostly chart music while also MCing.

Burridge's first big break came when he landed a residency at a club called The Palace in Somerset. He played weekly and was introduced to the art of mixing records by one of the club's other resident DJs, Wayne Rideout. It was also at The Palace during the summer of 1987 that a group of visitors turned Burridge on to London's emerging acid house sound.

=== Hong Kong (1991–1997) ===
In early 1991, Burridge was offered job in the then British colony of Hong Kong by a club owner from overseas.

He moved to Hong Kong to start a full-time DJ career for the first time at a club called Joe Banana's, where he engaged in antics such as hanging upside down from the sprinkler system above the booth. His sets typically catered to a more commercial audience. During this time, he credits himself with bringing UK's early rave parties to Hong Kong.

While in Hong Kong, Burridge helped establish Neptune's, a popular nightspot. He also performed in Thailand.

In his final few years in Hong Kong, he often invited visiting DJs to play at the Big Apple and Neptune's. It was after one of these weekends that he began his friendship with UK DJs Sasha and Craig Richards, who ended up inviting him to form the Tyrant Sound System upon his return to the UK.

=== All Day I Dream (2011–present) ===
Burridge started his All Day I Dream imprint in 2011, after a party at a rooftop in Brooklyn, New York City. The event spawned a worldwide annual touring festival, with parties taking place outdoors during the daytime. Burridge has also regularly performed at Burning Man. He appeared on BBC Radio 1's Essential Mix in 2015 and 2019.

In 2021, Burridge launched an off-shoot label, All Day I Dream in Waves.

== Selected discography ==
DJ mixes/compilations:

- 1998: Deeper Shades of Hooj: Volume Two (Hooj Choons)
- 1999: Metropolis (Tide)
- 2000: Tyrant with Craig Richards (Distinct'ive Breaks Records)
- 2001: Global Underground: Nubreed 005 (Boxed)
- 2002: No Shoes, No Cake with Craig Richards (Fabric, London)
- 2003: 24:7 (Boxed)
- 2005: This Is Everybody! On Tour (Ultra Records)
- 2007: Balance 012 (EQ Recordings)

Releases:

- 2001: Lost & Found EP (Fire)
- 2006: Treat 'Em Mean, Keep 'Em Keen (Almost Anonymous)
- 2007: Do You Smoke Pot? (Almost Anonymous)
- 2007: Raw Dog (Almost Anonymous)
- 2010: Wongel (Cecille)
- 2011: Here's Johnny (Leftroom)
- 2011: Groove Me (Pooled Music)
- 2012: Lost In A Moment (Innervisions)
- 2012: Tubby (Get Weird)
- 2012: Gemini Spell (All Day I Dream)
- 2012: Fur Die Liebe (All Day I Dream)
- 2013: Holding On (All Day I Dream)
- 2016: Stand Up Right (Get Weird)
- 2016: Lingala EP (All Day I Dream)
- 2017: Loopyness EP (All Day I Dream)
- 2017: Absent Without Thoughts (All Day I Dream)
- 2017: K Bug EP (Get Weird)
- 2018: Elongi EP (All Day I Dream)
- 2019: Melt (All Day I Dream)
