= DJ Hazard (musician) =

Dj Hazard
- Birth name: Scott Molloy
- Also known as: Dirty Harry
- Born: 1977 (age 47–48)
- Origin: Birmingham, England
- Genres: Drum and bass
- Occupation(s): Songwriter, musician, audio mixing, producer, DJ
- Years active: 1999–present
- Labels: Real Playaz, Ganja Records, Frontline Records, Playaz Digital, Hazardous Material

Scott Molloy (born 1977) known by his stage name DJ Hazard is a drum & bass DJ and producer from Birmingham.

== Biography ==
He is part of the True Playaz and Ganja Records labels and also releases songs under his alias Dirty Harry and Vague through his own record company, Radius Recordings. Originally noticed by DJ Hype while producing tracks for DJ SS's Formation Records he soon signed for Playaz Recordings. On the 4 March 2017, he won the Best DJ Award at the Drum and Bass Awards at Donington Park beating Andy C who has held it since the awards started in 2009.

DJ Hazard can be usually found on the last Friday of every month, at the FabricLive Playaz night at Fabric, Farringdon, London.

He has two children.

== Chart placings ==
- Cola Cube / Ninja Technique reached 21 on the UK Indie Chart on 2 September 2006.
- "Busted" reached 24 on the UK indie chart on 2 June 2007.
- "Mr. Happy (with Distorted Minds)" reached #19 on the UK indie chart on 13 October 2007.

== Discography ==
Whilst producing for Playaz Recordings, Hazard has produced numerous EPs such as Busted / 0121 in 2007, Mr Happy / Super Drunk with Distorted Minds in 2007, Machete Bass - EP, featuring the song "Killers Don't Die" in 2008, The Platinum Shadows - EP, featuring the song "Psychedelic" in 2010, Never the Same - EP, featuring the songs "Air Guitar" and "It's a Secret" and finally the "Time Tripping / Digital Bumble Bees" single. Hazard's most notable EP was the Bricks Don't Roll - EP released in 2014, featuring the song "Bricks Don't Roll" which is, still to date, one of the most well-known jump up drum and bass songs.
