= Fabric (club) =

Nightclub in London

fabric
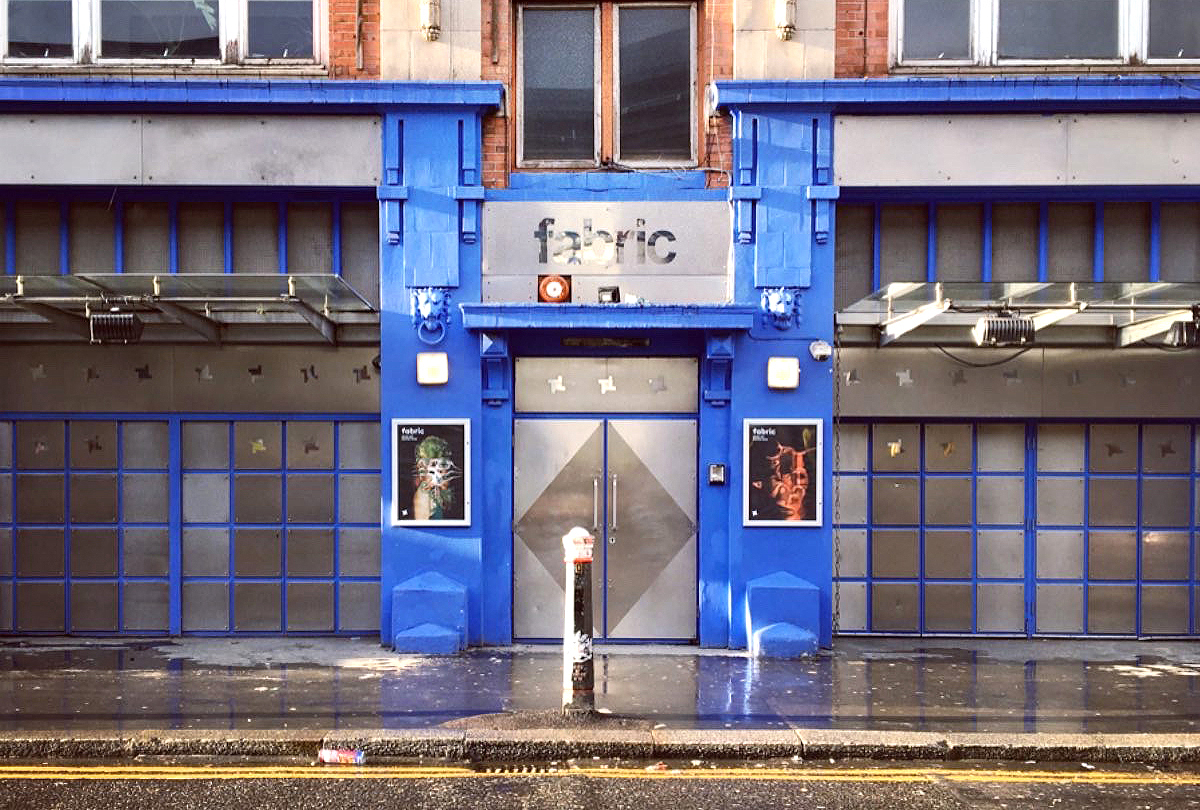
- Entrance in Charterhouse Street (2020)
- Interactive map of fabric
- Location: Farringdon, London, England
- Coordinates: 51°31′10.05″N 0°6′10.36″W
- Owner: Fabric Life Limited
- Capacity: 1,600
- Type: Nightclub

Construction
- Opened: 1999 (original open date); 2017 (reopen date)
- Closed: 2016 (reopened)

Website
- fabriclondon.com

Fabric (stylized as fabric) is a nightclub in Farringdon, London, England. Founded in 1999 on Charterhouse Street opposite Smithfield Market, the club was voted World Number 1 Club in DJ Magazine's "Top 100 Clubs Poll" in 2007 and 2008 and ranked World Number 2 in 2009, 2010 and 2017.

Fabric was closed down and its license was revoked by Islington Council in 2016, after two drug-related deaths at the club. Following a campaign to save the club it was permitted to reopen with increased security and restrictions.

== History ==
The club was founded by Keith Reilly and Cameron Leslie and opened on 29 October 1999.

Fabric occupied the renovated space of the Metropolitan Cold Stores. Smithfield Meat Market stands and operates from a site directly opposite. The area's construction took place in Victorian times alongside nearby landmarks Holborn Viaduct and Fleet Valley Bridge.

Fabric has three separate rooms with independent sound systems; two of the rooms feature stages for live acts. A feature of the club is its vibrating floor in Room One: known as a "bodysonic" dancefloor, sections of the floor are attached to 400 bass transducers emitting bass frequencies of the music being played.

In 2010, Fabric briefly went into administration after its sister club Matter, with whom it had a cross-guaranteed loan, announced it would close for the summer due to financial difficulties suffered as a consequence of continued delays with TfL upgrade of the Jubilee Line. Fabric was put on the market on 1 June 2010. On 24 June it was announced Fabric was no longer in administration and had been bought by the Fabric Life consortium.

=== 2016 closure and reopening ===
On 7 September 2016, after a review into the drug-related deaths of two people in the club, Leslie appeared in front of the licensing board to defend Fabric's way of handling drugs and drug dealers at their club. Fabric's licence was revoked and it was announced that the venue would be closed permanently. A campaign was launched to secure the club's future, backed and popularised by DJs, musicians, venue-goers and several politicians. London's mayor Sadiq Khan criticised the decision and placed it in the context of the city having lost 50% of its nightclubs since 2008, a "decline [which] must stop if London is to retain its status as a 24-hour city with a world-class nightlife".

Following the closure, supporters of the club launched a social media and crowdfunding campaign supporting reopening the club. Over £200,000 was raised toward a legal fighting fund to appeal the council's decision. In November 2016, news reports stated that the council and the club's management were working on an out of court settlement that might lead to the reopening of the club. On 21 November 2016, Fabric and Islington Council reached agreement that the club could reopen with stricter conditions: a new photo identification system, covert surveillance, a lifetime ban for anyone found dealing or possessing illegal drugs, and no under-19s allowed between Friday 8pm to Monday 8am.

Shortly after these changes were made, it was announced that Fabric would halve the number of "FABRICLIVE" bass-driven nights, which included their famous Playaz drum and bass residency, which spiked controversy among fans.

== Style ==
=== Fridays: FABRICLIVE ===
The musical genres played at Fabric vary. Friday nights (known as "FABRICLIVE") are dedicated to bass music genres, being mainly drum and bass since its inception. FABRICLIVE also features genres including grime, breakbeat, dubstep and bassline.

=== Saturdays: Fabric ===
Known simply as "Fabric", Saturday nights showcase genres such as house, techno and disco. Fabric ale features the club's resident DJs Craig Richards and Terry Francis. Richards was also one of the Directors of Music Programming, selecting the line-ups for Saturday nights, which have featured appearances by DJs such as Ricardo Villalobos, Carl Craig, Ellen Allien, and many others.

=== Sundays: Wetyourself ===
Sundays at Fabric are promoted by "Wetyourself", a polysexual event that has been running since February 2009. The music policy is underground house and techno, with the occasional live PA.

== Other ventures ==
A CD series was launched in 2001 under Fabric Records. It rotates monthly between Fabric and FABRICLIVE, with the series showcasing established and emerging DJs. It is entirely independent and operated solely by Fabric. The full list of titles in the series can be seen at Fabric discography.

On 19 September 2008, Reilly and Leslie opened the 2,600-capacity music venue Matter. Located in The O_{2}, it was their first project outside of Fabric. Matter has since closed.

Houndstooth is a record label from Fabric, started in February 2013.

== In popular culture ==
The nightclub was used as a filming location for the first season of the BBC America thriller series Killing Eve (2018–present), doubling as a Berlin nightclub in the episode "Don't I Know You?"

The nightclub was also used as the set in the 2005 music video for the song "E Talking" by Belgian duo Soulwax, directed by Evan Bernard.

== Awards and nominations ==
=== DJ Magazine's top 100 Clubs ===
Year	Position	Ref.
2006	1	
2007	2	
2008	1	
2009	2	
2010	2	
2011	2	
2012	8	
2013	4	
2014	4	
2015	15	
2016	15	
2017	2	
2018	9	
2019	15	
2020	24	
2021	13	
2022	13	
2023	17	
2024	7	

=== International Dance Music Awards ===
Year	Category	Work	Outcome	Ref.
2005 (Note: Category Debut)	Best Global Club	Fabric - London UK	Nominated	
2007	Best Global Club	Fabric - London UK	Nominated	
2010	Best Global Club	Fabric - London UK	Nominated	
2011	Best Global Club	Fabric - London UK	Nominated	
2012	Best Global Club	Fabric - London UK	Nominated	
2014	Best Global Club	Fabric - London UK	Nominated	
2015	Best Global Club	Fabric - London UK	Nominated	
2016	Best Global Club	Fabric - London UK	Nominated	

=== International Nightlife Association's Top 100 Clubs ===
Year	Position	Ref.
2015 (Note: 2015 saw the debut of the chart.)	10	
2016	27	
2017	32	
2018	32	
2022	17	

== See also ==
- List of electronic dance music venues
