= MC Tali =

- Born: Natalia Scott; 1976 (age 49–50); Taranaki, New Zealand
- Genres: Drum and bass; big beat; hip-hop
- Occupations: Singer; rapper
- Years active: 1996–present
- Labels: TALIMUSIC; AudioPorn Records; Full Cycle Recordings

Natalia Sheppard (née Scott), better known by her stage names MC Tali and Tali, is a New Zealand drum and bass singer and rapper, first found acclaim for her 2004 hit "Lyric on My Lip", which reached #39 in the UK Singles Chart. Tali has also worked with prominent artists, such as former Mercury Music Prize nominee Roni Size. Tali prefers to use the name "Tali" when singing and songwriting acoustically or live, preferring to use 'MC" whenever she collaborates with electronic music artists, sometimes using the former. In November 2019 Tali won the Vodafone New Zealand Music Award for Best Electronica Artist for her 2018 album "Love & Migration".

== Biography ==
Originally from a dairy farm in Awatuna, Taranaki, Tali moved to the UK in 2001 to follow her dreams of becoming a top international MC. After signing to the legendary Full Cycle Label owned and run by Roni Size, Tali went on to release her first album Lyric on my Lip with a UK top 40 single and worldwide tour. The album featured production from Roni Size, Krust, Die and featured guest vocals from Dynamite MC. From here she collaborated with some of the scene's most prolific names in both production and DJ/MC shows, working alongside people such as Goldie, Fabio, Grooverider, Shy FX, Dirtyphonics, Ed Rush, E-Z Rollers, The Freestylers, Calibre, DJ Marky and many more.

When Full Cycle disbanded in 2006, Tali moved to London for a change of scenery and music. Disillusioned with the drum and bass scene, and suffering from depression and anxiety, she began working alongside hip hop duo First Man, and from here collaborated with MC’s including Skinnyman, Blak Twang, Ti2bs and Sincere. From this came her compilation CD Do It for Yourself.

After regaining her confidence in 2008, Tali began MCing out and about on the drum and bass circuit once again. Her skills earned her “Best Female MC” at the Drum n Bass Awards three years in a row from 2008 to 2010. Afterwards, Tali signed to AudioPorn Records and released Dark Days, High Nights which features collaborations with Lynx, Dirtyphonics, Dodge & Fuski, Fourward, Noisses, Shimon, Ed Rush and SKisM. Tali also released a live studio version of this album in collaboration with indie/folk band More Like Trees, featuring Christoph Bauschinger, backing vocals from Collette Warren and production by legendary DnB producer Ant Miles in 2011.

During her hiatus from drum and bass, Tali also created an alias for herself, as a chance to explore her love of jazz and showtunes. Rogue Nouveau was born and from here Tali put together a live band, which produced jazz with a touch of her trademark MCing. Rogue Nouveau performed at prestigious venues throughout London, such as The Jazz Café and Ronnie Scott's Jazz Club, before disbanding when Tali moved back to New Zealand in 2012.

In 2011, Tali was commissioned as the composer for a political comedy musical called Nicked (written by Richard Marsh), which featured at The Hightide Theatre Festival and previewed on the West End. It received rave reviews in The Guardian, The Observer and London Evening Standard. While working on this musical, she met her co producer Christoph Bauschinger. Their friendship and work relationship on this project led to them collaborating on her fourth studio album. Of Things to Come..., which Tali released herself upon returning to New Zealand in 2012.

Tali's vocals were featured on the Activision game DJ Hero, and her songs have been used in promotion for Rob Dyrdek's Fantasy Factory on the Xtreme Sports Channel (Sky UK), Really and Soccer AM, and her voice-overs are used on BBC Radio 1 and BBC Radio 1Xtra. After moving back to New Zealand in 2012, Tali started her own radio show called The Morning Sickness on George FM (8 am – 10 am), which she gave up early 2015 due to touring commitments. She was also the corporate voice of the station for over a year.

Tali is a trained secondary school teacher at the Canterbury College of Education, has a diploma from The National Academy of Singing and Dramatic Arts (NASDA), a B.A. in English Literature also has vast experience in tutoring, mentoring, writing and vocal producing for other artists. As well as this Tali has written for ATM, Knowledge, Nu:Soul, and Guestlist Network publications in the UK and US and for 'Her' magazine in New Zealand.

After returning to New Zealand, Tali released Of Things to Come…, produced by Christoph Bauschinger and featured guest vocals from Laura Hunter. Distributed by Rhythm Method, Tali released two singles: "JetSet Love" received NZ On Air funding (shot by Mo’Fresh Productions) and "Of Things to Come…" was funded independently (shot by Toby Ricketts). Tali initially toured this album with a live band, before stripping it back to acoustic form with her guitarist and co-collaborator Harry Leatherby in order to focus more on her musical performance. In May 2015 Tali finished producing, writing and recording her own independent album Wolves, which went to #14 in the New Zealand album charts in its first week of release. The first single from this - "Forces" was remixed by TREi and went to #18 in the New Zealand singles charts. Tali released two further singles from this 'Faster Than Sound' and 'Wolves' with additional music videos. Following on from this, in 2016 Tali released 'KETA' a dreamy, downtempo cinematic EP featuring production from Tokyo Prose, Aske, and Sam De Jong and vocal cameos from Kings and Bailey Wiley. Singles from this included 'High To Get High', 'I Fly Over You' and 'Berlin' all of which have accompanying music videos.

In 2018 Tali published her first ever fiction novel 'The Little White House' under her full name Natalia Sheppard - which was published by UK publishing house Vanguard Press. That same year, seven years since she last released a full Drum and Bass album, Tali released 'Love & Migration' on Fokuz Records (Netherlands). This album features production from Malaky, Kasper, Melinki, The Vanguard Project and Roygreen and Protone amongst others, and vocal features from DRS, Degs and Georgie Fisher. Singles from the album include 'Eye On You' and 'Paperwasp'. This album saw Tali take out 'Best Electronic Artist' at the 2019 Vodafone New Zealand Music Awards.

In 2020, Tali celebrated 15 years since the release of her debut album 'Lyric On My Lip' with both its first ever digital release, and an accompanying documentary which Tali produced herself, during lockdown. The digital release was launched on Tali's newly formed record label Reign Recordings, and the documentary features interviews with Roni Size, Dynamite MC, Bryan G, A.I, Collette Warren, Ray Keith, and many more.

As well as this, during lockdown Tali refined her skills as a producer, and began working on her eighth studio album 'Future Dwellers' which she released in 2022, and which was nominated for an Aotearoa Music Award. Her two single off the album were 'My Remedy' featuring UK Drum n Bass artist Ruth Royall and 'Lost Up In Your Love' featuring Pharaoh Swami. Tali was also asked to remix the indie folk song 'Hawks and Doves' for acclaimed New Zealand singer Reb Fountain. This remix was released on Flying Nun in 2021. During the same year Tali attended the Aotearoa SyncPosium, a workshop designed to bring together musicians and composers to learn about the world of composing for film and television. From here Tali went on to break into the world of composing, successfully securing contracts to make music for both online and television work, as well as currently writing the score for her first international documentary film.

Tali continues to perform and tour both as a singer/songwriter and MC, both in New Zealand and internationally, and works collaboratively with DJs and producers onstage and in the studio. She is a music consultant, mentor, inspirational speaker, and educator. Tali currently lives in Auckland with her husband - DJ and promoter, Chiccoreli.

== Discography ==
=== Albums ===
Title	Album details
Lyric on My Lip	Released: 9 February 2004; Format: CD and singles on vinyl; Label: Full Cycle Records
Do It For Yourself (the mixtape)	Released 2006; Self Released; Format: CD and digital
Dark Days, High Nights	Released: September 2011; Format: CD, and digital; Label: AudioPorn Records, Now on Reign Recordings 2023
Dark Days, High Nights (The live and acoustic album)	Released: 2011; Format: Digital; Audioporn Records, Now on Reign Recordings 2023
Of Things To Come...	Released: 2012; Format: Digital; Self Release - now on Reign Recordings
Wolves	Released: 2015; Format: Digital; Self Released - now on Reign Recordings
KETA (E.P)	Released: 2017: Self Released; Format: Digital
Love & Migration	Released: 29 October 2018; Format: Digital; Fokuz Recordings
Future Dwellers	Released 2022; Format: Digital; Reign Recordings

=== Singles ===
- "Lyric on My Lip" (Full Cycle Records, 2004) - UK No. 75
- "Blazin" (Full Cycle Records, 2004) - UK No. 42, AUS No. 97
- "Lyric on My Lip" (re-release, 2004) - UK No. 39
- "Airport Lounge" (Full Cycle Records, 2004)
- "High Hopes (All Over Now)" (Full Cycle Records, 2004)
- "Tali Story" (Easy/Sativa Records, 2007)
- "Dark Days" / "Lost in the Game" (AudioPorn Records, 2011)
- "Facing Forwards" / "Who Can Say?" (AudioPorn Records, 2011)
- "JetSet Love" (Talimusic 2012)
- "Of Things to Come..." (Talimusic 2012)
- "Walk a Mile" (Talimusic 2014)
- "Forces" (Talimusic 2014)
- "Faster Than Sound" (Talimusic 2014)
- "Wolves" (Talimusic 2015)
- "Forces" TREi Remix (Viper Recordings, UK 2014)
- "How to Get High" (Talimusic 2016)
- "I Fly Over You" featuring Kings (Talimusic 2016)
- "Berlin" (Talimusic 2016)
- "Powerful" featuring Melodownz (Talimusic 2017)
- "Eye On You" (Fokuz Recordings 2018)
- "Paperwasp" Lenzman Remix (Fokuz Recordings)
- "Love & Migration" State Of Mind Remix (Fokuz Recordings 2019)
- "Hawks & Doves" (Tali Remix) -Reb Fountain - 2021 - Flying Nun Records
- "My Remedy" Featuring Ruth Royall 2022 (Reign Recordings)
- "Lost Up In Your Love" Featuring Pharaoh Swami 2022 (Reign Recordings)
- "Make It Right" (Tali Remix) - Denel -2023
- "I'm On A Roll" 2023 (Reign Recordings)
- "Ever Enough" 2023 (Reign Recordings)

=== Featured on ===
- Ahoribuzz - "Providence" (2014)
- Asides & Makoto - 'In Your Arms" (Aquarian Dreams 2015)
- Atlantic Connection - "Good Hood Review" (feat. MC Tali) (Hot Pink Delorean Remix)
- Atlantic Connection - "Good Hood Review" (feat. MC Tali)
- Atlantic Connection - "So Me" (feat. MC Tali)
- Blak Twang - "Travellin' " (feat. MC Tali) (First Man Remix)
- Bulletproof - "Lessons" (2013)
- Camo and Krooked - "Verve" (feat. Tali) - Audioporn Records 2010)
- Chaz Jankel - "I Come Alive" (feat. MC Tali)
- Clipz - "Forever" (feat. MC Tali)
- Clipz - "Sound Boy" (feat. MC Tali) (VIP Remix)
- Clipz - "Sound Boy" (feat. MC Tali)
- Clipz - "Thinking Forward (feat. MC Tali)"
- Concord Dawn - "Moonlighting" (2014)
- CTRL-Z & Screwface present Stereo:Type - "Under My Skin (feat. MC Tali)"
- Dan Aux - "Fcvk Yes" (2014)
- Denel - "Make It Right" The Tali Remix - 2023
- Die & Skitz - "It's On (feat. MC Tali & Dynamite MC)" (Clipz Remix)
- Die & Skitz - "It's On (feat. MC Tali & Dynamite MC)"
- Dirtyphonics - "The Secret" (AudioPorn Records, 2010)
- Dope Ammo - "Cold Rock A Party" feat Tali 2012
- Dope Ammo - "Cold Rock A Party" feat Tali - Dossa & Locuzzed Remix 2016 - Influence Album Sampler vol 1
- Dope Ammo - "Cold Rock A Party" feat Tali - Jayden Remix 2012
- Dope Ammo - "Cold Rock A Party" feat Tali - Slumdogz Remix 2012
- Drumsound & Bassline Smith - "In the Silence (feat. MC Tali)"
- Eavesdrop - "What Do They Know?" (2013)
- Eavesdrop - "Sideshow" (2014)
- Eavesdrop - "This Moment" (2017)
- Elipsa - "Divine" featuring Tali 2022 - UKF
- E-Z Rollers - "Slow Fire feat Tali - Conductor album (2007)
- E-Z Rollers -"Lets Give In/Liar Liar" (Intercom Recordings 2008)
- First Man - "Help Them (feat. MC Tali & Blak Twang)" 2006
- First Man - "Set It Off (feat. MC Tali & Skinnyman)" 2006
- Fourward - "Facing Fourwards (feat. Tali)" [Audioporn Records 2011]
- Harriet Jaxxon "What We Gonna Do?" Featuring Tali 2021 DnB Arena
- Krust & Die - "Hold It Down (feat. MC Tali)"
- Krust & Die - "Soul Beat Calling (feat. MC Tali)"
- Krust & Die - "Sounds of the Culture (feat. MC Tali & Rodney P)"
- Lynx & Kemo - "The Real Thing (feat. MC Tali & Vaceo)"
- MayaVanya - "Rockets" (2014)
- Monika and Akuratyde "House On Fire" 2020 - Fokuz Recordings
- Monika and Akuratyde "House On Fire VIP" feat Tali - 2023 - Fokuz Recordings
- Mutated Forms - "Blue Magic" (SS Remix - New Identity Recordings, 2008)
- Paramount - "Wanderlust" (Broken Audio 2015)
- Patife & SUV - "Inta Outa (feat. MC Tali)" (Rock Mix)
- Patife & SUV - "Inta Outa (feat. MC Tali)" (Surge Remix)
- Patife & SUV - "Inta Outa (feat. MC Tali)"
- Pixel - "Only Way" featuring Tali 2016 - Mr Funky EP - Fokuz Recordings
- Roni Size - "Cheeky Monkey (feat. MC Tali & Dynamite MC)"
- SMP "Nighthawke" featuring Tali 2020 - Fokuz Recordings
- SUV - "Do You Remember Me? (feat. MC Tali)"
- Severity Zero - "Tapestry" - Tapestry EP (Fokuz Recordings 2015)
- Sanoi "Paradigm Shift EP" 2021 "Vortex featuring Tali and ROWA"
- The Freestylers - "This City (feat. Tali)"
- Tiki Taane - "Summertime" - 'With Strings Attached' (Alive & Orchestrated) 2014
- Tiki Taane - "Forces Remix" - In Session With The CSO 2023
- TREI - "Rebels" featuring Tali - 2018 - Viper Recordings
- TREi - "Homecoming" feat Tali (2012)
- Xilent - "Gravity (feat. Tali)" 2011

=== Compilations ===
- Do It for Yourself Mixtape, 2007
- Deep Sound Vol 1 - DJ SS and Influx UK - New Identity Recordings, 2008
- Soulside Sessions Vol 1 - Free online DnB mix with DJ Emma G, 2011
- Soulside Sessions Vol 2 - Free online DnB mix with DJ Emma G, 2012
- Soulside Sessions Vol 3 - Free online DnB mix with DJ Emma G, 2012
- Soulside Sessions Vol 4- Free online DnB mix with DJ Emma G, 2013
- Soulside Sessions Vol 5- Free online DnB mix with DJ Emma G, 2013
- Soulside Sessions Vol 6 - Free online DnB mix with DJ Emma G, 2014
- Soulside Sessions Vol 7 - Free online DnB mix with DJ Emma G, 2015
- Soulside Sessions Vol 8 - Free online DnB mix with DJ Emma G, 2016
- Soulside Sessions Vol 9 - Free online DnB mix with DJ Emma G, 2017
- Soulside Sessions Vol 10 - Free online DnB mix with DJ Emma G, 2020

== Awards and nominations ==
Awards	Year	Type	Song or album	Notes
New Zealand Music Awards	2019	Best Electronic Artist	"Love & Migration"	Won
