= Roni Size & Reprazent discography =

- Studio albums: 2
- EPs: 1
- Live albums: 1
- Compilation albums: 1
- Singles: 8
- Music videos: 3

The following is a comprehensive discography of Roni Size & Reprazent, a British drum and bass group. The group released an EP in 1996. They released their debut studio album, New Forms, in 1997 with four singles, followed by In the Mode in 2000 with three singles. A 1997 remix album was also released. A 2008 re-release of their debut album, New Forms², was released with one single. Recently, in 2015, they released a live album.

== Albums ==
=== Studio albums ===
Title	Album details	Chart positions								Certifications (sales thresholds)
Title	Album details	UK	BEL	FRA	NLD	NZ	SWI	US	US Heat.	Certifications (sales thresholds)
New Forms	Released: 23 June 1997; Label: Talkin' Loud, Mercury; Format: CD, cassette, vinyl	8	—	—	96	37	—	—	36	BPI: Platinum
In the Mode	Released: 9 October 2000; Label: Talkin' Loud; Format: CD, cassette, vinyl	15	45	70	55	—	59	181	10	
"—" denotes a release that did not chart or was not released in that territory.

==== Re-releases ====
Title	Album details	Charts
Title	Album details	UK Dance
New Forms²	Released: April 2008; Label: Universal; Formats: CD, digital download	22

=== Compilation albums ===
Title	Album details
Replica – The Remix Album	Released: 26 December 1997; Label: Talkin' Loud, Mercury; Formats: CD

=== Live albums ===
Title	Album details
Live at Colston Hall (with William Goodchild and the Emerald Ensemble)	Released: 27 November 2015; Label: Mansion Sounds; Formats: CD, DVD

== Extended plays ==
Title	EP details
Reasons for Sharing	Released: 25 November 1996; Label: Talkin' Loud; Formats: CD, vinyl

== Singles ==
Title	Year	Peak chart positions		Album
Title	Year	UK	UK Dance	Album
"Share the Fall"	1997	37	1	New Forms
"Heroes"	1997	31	1	New Forms
"Brown Paper Bag"	1997	20	2	New Forms
"Watching Windows"	1998	28	1	New Forms
"Who Told You"	2000	17	4	In the Mode
"Dirty Beats"	2001	32	1	In the Mode
"Lucky Pressure"	2001	58	3	In the Mode
"Don't Hold Back"	2008	—	14	New Forms²
"—" denotes a recording that did not chart or was not released in that territory.
