= Apparently Nothin' =

Single by Young Disciples

from the album Road to Freedom
- Released: 1991
- Genre: Acid jazz; funk; soul
- Length: 3:57
- Label: Talkin' Loud
- Songwriters: Carleen Anderson; Marco Nelson
- Producers: Demus; Young Disciples

Young Disciples singles chronology
"Get Yourself Together" (1990)	"Apparently Nothin'" (1991)	"Get Yourself Together (reissue)" (1991)

Music video
- "Apparently Nothin' (12" Mix)" on YouTube

"Apparently Nothin" is a song by British/American acid jazz band Young Disciples. It features singer Carleen Anderson, who also co-wrote it and was released in 1991 by Talkin' Loud as the second single from the band's only album, Road to Freedom (1991). The song samples "Here I Am Baby" by the Marvelettes and is inspired by the Gulf War. It peaked at number 13 on the UK Singles Chart, but on the UK Dance Singles chart, it was even more successful, peaking at number two. Additionally, it was a top-20 hit in Luxembourg and a top-40 hit in the Netherlands. The band performed the song in the British music chart television programme Top of the Pops. It remains their biggest hit and is now widely considered as a classic of its genre.

In 1999, a new version of "Apparently Nothin'" was released with Anderson and British acid jazz and funk group The Brand New Heavies, peaking at number 32 in the UK.

== Chart performance ==
"Apparently Nothin'" charted in several European countries. In Luxembourg, the single peaked at number 12 in its second week within the top 20 in August 1991, after entering the chart on number 17 the week before. It then dropped to number 15 and 19 before leaving the chart. In the Netherlands, the single spent four weeks on the Dutch Top 40 Tipparade, before entering the Dutch Top 40 chart with three weeks within it and peaking at number 34. On the Single Top 100 chart, it spent a total of eight weeks within, peaking at number 36 on October 19, 1991. On the Eurochart Hot 100, the single peaked at number 45.

In the UK, "Apparently Nothin'" debuted on the UK Singles Chart on number 55 on February 17, 1991. 46, 59, 62 before leaving the chart. Then in July, it reappeared at number 33, climbing to number 19 and peaking at number 13 on August 11. The following weeks, the song dropped to number 15, 30, 42 and 64. On the Music Week Dance Singles chart, it reached number two in February 1991.

== Critical reception ==
American magazine Billboard named the song "wildly contagious". An editor, Larry Flick, wrote, "Here we have a downtempo jam, fueled with a chunky swing beat (are those real drums we hear ?!) and snakey guitar work. Would slip snugly into sets that include Deee-Lite and Soul II Soul." He added that Anderson injects a "gospel-like fervor into the tune's wildly infectious hook". Martin Johnson from Chicago Reader felt her "piercing vocals" were igniting the track, naming it "perhaps the best bit of pop social commentary so far this decade." An editor from Daily Mirror said she makes tracks like "Apparently Nothin'" "hard to forget". The Independent described it as "era-defining", indicating that the singer "became one of the most recognisable voices of the soul, jazz-funk movement" of the time, and that the emergence of the band along with acts Soul II Soul, Omar, Incognito, D'Influence and Galliano "was as groundbreaking an era as black British music has ever known." A reviewer from Knight Ridder stated that it is "destined to be a club hit", writing that it "involve thick, jazzy bass paired against thin keyboards that prove for the smoothest-yet fusion of hip hop and jazz — acid jazz." Pan-European magazine Music & Media said that Anderson's lead vocals are "pure soul delight", as illustrated on "Apparently Nothin'". Davydd Chong from Music Week's RM Dance Update called it a "mind-numbingly brilliant track", "uplifting, inspirational and funky". The magazine's James Hamilton declared it as a "Carleen Anderson wailed rare groove-style lurcher".

Mandi James from NME commented, "Am I jumping the gun, or are delicious vocals and refined arrangements coming back into vogue? Cool, calm and sophisticated. Young Disciples take things nice and easy with blues beats and a funkin' good ambience. If you know what's good for you, trash your hi-top trainers and invest in some Hush-Puppies." Another editor, Stephen Dalton, said that "the Disciples are mixin' that '60s soul-funk sound with tough, clean, bang-up-to-date production and creatin' modern R&B in the process. This cut is bitchin'." Dennis Romero from Philadelphia Inquirer felt it's "destined to be a club hit". Phil Cheeseman from Record Mirror wrote, "All very mid-Eighties warehouse jams this kind of low-slung funk, but there's something very sexy about this and Carleen Anderson's vocal is superb, suggesting that the Disciples could be on to something here. Kicks harder than Liverpool when they're one down." Marc Andrews from Smash Hits found that it "was one of those rare soul-funk throwbacks to the '70s that actually sounded exceptionally groovy and hip in these here cool-catting '90s." Charles Aaron from Spin remarked that "this Brit duo with diva-for-hire replaces Soul II Soul's capitalist uplift goo-goo with a fretful attitude and snappier grooves. The Large Professor Rap Mix thumps with even less patience." Another editor, Jonathan Bernstein, declared it as "elegant" and "Gulf War-inspired".

== Impact and legacy ==
NME ranked "Apparently Nothin'" number 29 in their list of "Singles of the Year" in December 1991. In 1994, the magazine featured the track in their list of "Top ten vibin' modern soul-jazz masterstrokes that every 'face' should own", writing, "The day Talkin' Loud came good. A spindly funky thing, it married a deep-seated sense of black history with impeccable pop suss, and provided the launchpad for the slightly less-than-spectacular solo career of Carleen Anderson."

British DJ, radio show host, and founder/managing director of Acid Jazz Records, Eddie Piller named "Apparently Nothin'" one of his favourites in 1996, saying, "One of the best British soul tunes of all time. This record took British soul to a new level."

Josh Strauss from The Guardian wrote in 2013, "My memory of this song is sitting in very long car journeys to Cumbria or the south of France with only my Game Boy and my stepdad's cassette tapes for entertainment. Whilst some tapes compelled me to plug in my headphones and focus on the endlessly repetitive, but strangely hypnotic theme tune from Tetris, "Apparently Nothin'" always got me jumping up and down in the back seat and drumming on the driver's headrest; much to the annoyance of my parents."

== Track listing ==
- 7" single, Uk & Europe (1991)
1. "Apparently Nothin'" (Edit)
2. "Apparently Nothin'" (Soul River Mix)
- 12" single, UK & Europe (1991)
1. "Apparently Nothin'"
2. "Apparently Nothin'" (Soul River Mix)
3. "Apparently Nothin'" (Instrumental)
- CD single, Europe (1991)
1. "Apparently Nothin'" (Edit) — 4:03
2. "Apparently Nothin'" — 4:40
3. "Apparently Nothin'" (Soul River Mix) — 5:24
4. "Apparently Nothin'" (Instrumental) — 4:38

== Charts ==
=== Weekly charts ===
Chart (1991)	Peak position
Europe (Eurochart Hot 100)	45
Luxembourg (Radio Luxembourg)	12
Netherlands (Dutch Top 40)	34
Netherlands (Single Top 100)	36
UK Singles (OCC)	13
UK Airplay (Music Week)	14
UK Dance (Music Week)	2
UK Club Chart (Record Mirror)	2

=== Year-end charts ===
Chart (1991)	Position
UK Club Chart (Record Mirror)	45
