= In the Mode =

Studio album by Roni Size & Reprazent
- Released: 9 October 2000
- Genres: Drum and bass; electronica; trip hop
- Length: 79:47
- Label: Talkin' Loud
- Producers: Roni Size; DJ Die; Krust; Suv; Rahzel

Roni Size & Reprazent chronology
New Forms (1997)	In the Mode (2000)	New Forms² (2008)

Singles from In the Mode
- 1. "Who Told You" Released: 25 September 2000; 2. "Dirty Beats" Released: 12 March 2001; 3. "Lucky Pressure" Released: 11 June 2001

In the Mode (stylised as In the Møde) is the second studio album by English drum and bass group Roni Size & Reprazent, released on 9 October 2000 on the Talkin' Loud label via Mercury Records. The follow-up to the group's 1997 Mercury Music Prize-winning album New Forms, In the Mode featured guest appearances from Method Man, Rahzel and Rage Against the Machine frontman Zack de la Rocha.

== Background and recording ==
Roni Size & Reprazent released their debut album, New Forms, in June 1997 to critical acclaim and commercial success, peaking at number 8 in the UK Album Chart. After winning the 1997 Mercury Music Prize, the group found international fame and became an in-demand live band. Size donated the £25,000 prize money to the Bristol youth centre where he had learned to program a drum machine. Writing for In the Mode began at rehearsals for their live tour, where the band would create new music by jamming using samplers and live instruments. This new music saw Reprazent relying on fewer jazz influences and moving towards a harder hip-hop-influenced sound.

== Release ==
The album was preceded by the release of the single "Who Told You" on 25 September, which reached number 17 on the UK Singles Chart and was promoted by a music video directed by Hype Williams. The tracks "Dirty Beats" and "Lucky Pressure" were also released as singles.

== Reception ==
=== Commercial performance ===
In the Mode entered the UK Albums Chart during the week ending 21 October 2000 and peaked at number 15. In the United States, the album reached number 10 on the Heatseekers Albums chart and number 181 on the Billboard 200 chart.

=== Critical response ===
Professional ratings
Aggregate scores
Source	Rating
Metacritic	79/100
Review scores
Source	Rating
AllMusic	3/5 stars
Alternative Press	4/5
Entertainment Weekly	B+
Melody Maker	4.5/5 stars
Mixmag	4/5 stars
NME	7/10
Q	3/5 stars
Rolling Stone	3.5/5 stars
Spin	9/10
The Village Voice	A

In the Mode was released to some critical acclaim. At Metacritic, which assigns a weighted average score out of 100 to reviews and ratings from mainstream critics, the album received a score of 79, based on 16 reviews, indicating "generally favourable reviews".

AllMusic rated In the Mode four stars out of five, though reviewer John Bush noted that "the highlights are over far too quickly, and the weaker tracks never should have appeared in the first place." Marc Savlov, writing for The Austin Chronicle, awarded the album three stars out of five saying that it was "packed to bursting with arcane beats and skittery jungle rhythms" but remarked that it was "not so much out of date as it is out of time." The A.V. Club's Joshua Klein described In the Mode as "another volley of stylish drum-and-bass", though he noted that it "suffers a bit from overkill." Writing for Drowned in Sound, reviewer Chris Nettleton wished for "more variety of tone" and awarded the album six out of ten. A review in the NME described the album as "an example of fierce, righteous, and...fearlessly British innovation." and stated that "Roni Size and Reprazent are leaders in a field of one", awarding a score of seven out of ten. Vibe writer Jon Caramanica opined that In the Mode "just regurgitates old forms" and rated the album two and a half stars out of five. Robert Christgau, writing for The Village Voice, gave the album an A rating, noting that "the album moves the way you always hope jungle will, like a cross between a tiger and a snake."

== Track listing ==
In the Mode track listing
No.	Title	Writer(s)	Length
1.	"Railing (Part 2)"	Williams; Smith	3:14
2.	"In + Out"	Williams; Bowen	6:08
3.	"System Check"	Williams; Smith	4:01
4.	"Ghetto Celebrity" (featuring Method Man)	Williams; Thompson; Kausman; C. Smith	6:46
5.	"Lucky Pressure"	Williams; Southey; Bowen	5:14
6.	"Balanced Chaos"	Williams; Kausman; Bowen	7:43
7.	"Switchblade"	Williams; Smith	4:03
8.	"In Tune with the Sound" (featuring Rahzel)	Williams; Southey; Rahzel	2:28
9.	"Who Told You"	Williams; Kausman; Smith	3:05
10.	"Heavy Rotation"	Williams; Kausman	6:28
11.	"Staircase"	Williams; Bowen	4:24
12.	"Mexican"	Williams	6:37
13.	"Dirty Beats"	Williams; Smith	4:02
14.	"Out of the Game"	Williams; Bowen	5:32
15.	"Centre of the Storm" (featuring Zack de la Rocha)	Williams; de la Rocha	7:50
16.	"Idi Banashapan"	Williams	4:12
17.	"Snapshot"	Williams; Smith; Bowen	4:21
18.	"Play the Game"	Williams; Bowen	1:48

== Personnel ==
All personnel credits adapted from In the Mode's liner notes.

Reprazent

- Roni Size – keyboards, programming, production, recording
- Krust – keyboards, programming, production, recording
- DJ Die – keyboards, programming, production, recording
- Suv – engineering, programming, production, recording
- Onallee – vocals
- Dynamite MC – vocals

Recording personnel

- Dave Amso – mixing engineer, recording engineer, Pro Tools
- Lou Ortez – mixing engineer, recording engineer
- Steve Solar – recording engineer, Pro Tools
- Stuart Hawkes – mastering

Additional personnel

- Michael Williams – art direction
- Tim Bret-Day – photography

Additional performers

- Ben Watt – guitar
- Si John – bass
- Rob Merrill – drums
- Spry – percussion
- Max Richter – strings
- Alex Byron-Collins – piano
- Joe Allen – bass
- Method Man – vocals
- Zack de la Rocha – vocals
- Rahzel – vocals

== Charts ==
Chart performance for In the Mode
Chart (2000)	Peak position
Belgian Albums (Ultratop Flanders)	45
Canada Top Albums/CDs (RPM)	43
Dutch Albums (Album Top 100)	55
French Albums (SNEP)	70
Swiss Albums (Schweizer Hitparade)	59
UK Albums (Official Charts)	15
US Billboard 200	181
