= Road to Freedom (album) =

Studio album by Young Disciples
- Released: 1991
- Recorded: October–November 1990
- Genres: Soul; rock; acid jazz
- Label: Talkin' Loud
- Producers: Demus; Young Disciples

Road to Freedom is the only album by British-American soul and jazz band Young Disciples. Released in 1991 on the Talkin' Loud label in the UK and on Polygram in the US, the critically well-received album was influential in the music genres of acid jazz and neo soul. Containing two charting singles, "Get Yourself Together" and "Apparently Nothin'", the album reached a chart position of number 21. It was on the short list of nominees for the 1992 Mercury Prize and was reissued in 1993 as a limited edition with a bonus remix EP of the song "Apparently Nothin'".

== Background ==
The Young Disciples were formed when British duo Femi Williams and Marco Nelson invited American vocalist Carleen Anderson to join them. The trio released two singles, each of which charted separately twice: "Get Yourself Together" at number 68 (1990-10-13) and number 65 (1991-10-05) and "Apparently Nothin'" at number 46 (1991-02-23) and number 13 (1991-08-03). A 1992 eponymous EP also charted, reaching number 48 (1992-09-02).

The Independent described "Apparently Nothin'" as "era-defining", indicating that singer Anderson "became one of the most recognisable voices of the soul, jazz-funk movement" of the time and that the emergence of the band along with acts Soul II Soul, Omar, Incognito, D'Influence and Galliano "was as groundbreaking an era as black British music has ever known." But in spite of the success of the singles and the album, which charted at number 21, it was the only album the trio ever produced. According to Anderson, the album was a "fluke", as Nelson "never felt comfortable or wanted the role of being an artist".

== Release and reception ==
Professional ratings
Review scores
Source	Rating
AllMusic	4/5 stars
BBC Online	(favorable)
NME	8/10
People	(favorable)
The Philadelphia Inquirer	3/4 stars
Time Out	4/5 stars

Road to Freedom was first released in the UK in 1991 on the label Talkin' Loud. It was later released in the United States on Polygram Records with some changes in the track list. On the British edition, the songs "All I Have" and "Step Right On" are dub versions, but for the US release they were replaced with vocal versions. The album was re-released as a limited edition in 1993 with an additional disc, a remix EP of "Apparently Nothing."

The album was critically well received. Trouser Press described it as "a masterpiece of understated soul, a seamless blend of samplers and studio musicians and a blueprint for the nascent acid jazz and trip-hop movements." The Milwaukee Journal Sentinel listed it as among the ten best albums of 1991, with reviewer Robert Tanzilo noting that "[t]he cream of London's jazz/soul posse get the formula right...." The Atlanta Journal-Constitution stated that "[w]ith each track on "Road to Freedom," the road gets a little easier to travel." Billboard magazine wrote favorably of the album, stating that it "easily stands the test of time, thanks to clever, well-crafted tunes that are steeped in retro-funk and R&B sensibilities." In 2004, it was featured at number 84 in an Observer poll of 100 music industry professionals of "The 100 Greatest British Albums". In its review at the time, The Observer indicated that the album did not reach the sales it deserved as "a record that revels in understated soul and sample-savvy jazz, rare groove and hip hop."

== Influence ==
In spite of underselling, it became a highly influential album in two genres. 2002's The Techno Primer indicates it was "very influential" in acid jazz, as the band "set the tone for this movement." In the latter half of the 2000s, BBC disc jockey Trevor Nelson featured Road to Freedom as "album of the week", noting that due to its combination of influences—"muscular" funk, jazz, R&B and British Hip Hop—with "clever, unpredictable productions" and Anderson's "low, smoky vocals", the album "is still deemed to be one of the most important albums to emerge from the acid jazz scene." 2006's A Change is Gonna Come also cites the album as important in neo soul, including it along with R. Kelly's R., D'Angelo's Voodoo, Maxwell's Urban Hang Suite, Aaliyah's self-titled final release and Faith Evans' Keep the Faith as among "the starter kit" for the genre.

== Track listing ==
1. "Get Yourself Together" (Carleen Anderson, Marc Nelson, Femi Williams) – 6:13
2. "Apparently Nothin'" (Anderson, Nelson) – 5:22
3. "Funky Yeh Funki (Mek It)" (Nelson) – :40
4. "Talkin' What I Feel" (Masta Ace, Nelson) – 4:08
5. "All I Have (In Dub)" (Anderson, Demus, Nelson) – 5:22
6. "Move On" (Anderson, Nelson) – 3:29
7. "As We Come (To Be)" (Anderson) – 4:35
8. "Step Right On (Dub)" (I. Bellow, Nelson, Williams) – 3:56
9. "Freedom Suite: (I) Freedom/ (II) Wanting / (III) To Be Free" (Anderson, IG Culture, Demus, Michael Talbot) – 15:58
10. "Young Disciples Theme" (MC Mell'O', Nelson, Williams) – 1:58

Bonus tracks

1993 limited edition bonus disc. All tracks by Carleen Anderson and Marc Nelson.

1. "Apparently Nothin' (Edit)" – 3:57
2. "Apparently Nothin' (Soul River Edit)" – 3:53
3. "Apparently Nothin' (The Re-Rub Edit)" – 3:37
4. "Apparently Nothin' (Large Professor Rap Mix)" – 4:07

== Personnel ==
- Carleen Anderson – keyboards, vocals, horn arrangements
- Maxton G. Beesley, Jr. – drums
- M.C. Bellow – rap
- Chris Clunn – photography
- Demus (Dilip Harris) – arranger, record producer, audio mixing, beats
- Pee Wee Ellis – tenor saxophone
- Phil Hudson – guitar
- K-Gee – scratching, rap
- Masta Ace – rap
- MC Mell'O' – rap
- Marc Nelson – organ, bass guitar, guitar, scratching, melodica, beats
- Maceo Parker – alto saxophone
- Spry – percussion
- Swifty – design, typography
- Michael Talbot – piano, keyboards, clavinet, Moog synthesizer
- Paul Weller – guitar (track 7)
- Fred Wesley – trombone
- Steve White – drums
- Femi Williams – percussion, drum programming
- Young Disciples – arranger, producer, mixing, concept

== Charts ==
Chart (1991–92)	Peak position
Australian Albums (ARIA)	117
UK Albums Chart	21

== See also ==
- Acid jazz
- Brown Sugar
- Neo soul
