= Return to V =

Studio album by Roni Size
- Released: October 2004
- Genre: Drum and bass, hip hop
- Label: V Recordings; Thrive

Roni Size chronology
Touching Down (2002)	Return to V (2004)	New Forms² (2008)

Professional ratings
Review scores
Source	Rating
AllMusic	3/5 stars
The Guardian	3/5 stars
Rolling Stone	2/5 stars

Return to V is the second solo studio album by the drum and bass DJ Roni Size. It was released in 2004. The album was influenced by Size's love of soul music; many of the songs make use of vocalists.

"The Streets" was featured in the 2005 racing video game Juiced.

== Critical reception ==
The album drew mixed to positive reviews. CMJ New Music Report called it a "solid drum 'n' bass record," but expressed disappointment that Size had not developed his sound.

== Track listing ==
No.	Title	Length
1.	"Bump 'n' Grind" (featuring MC Sweetpea)	5:31
2.	"Shoulder to Shoulder"	2:28
3.	"Fassyhole"	2:34
4.	"Pull Up"	2:55
5.	"Groove On / Come and Play"	3:17
6.	"Cheeky Monkey" (featuring Dynamite MC)	4:04
7.	"Time"	3:03
8.	"Problems"	3:15
9.	"Rise Up"	3:19
10.	"Want Your Body"	4:33
11.	"No Trouble" (featuring Rodney P)	4:17
12.	"No More" (featuring Dynamite MC)	4:29
13.	"On and On" (featuring Stamina MC)	6:08
14.	"Sing"	5:34
15.	"Thirsty"	3:23
16.	"The Streets" (featuring Fallacy)	3:49
17.	"Out of Breath" (featuring Rahzel)	5:35
18.	"Give Me a Reason"	4:10
