= True Spirit =

True Spirit may refer to:

- True Spirit (film), a 2023 Australian biographical drama film
- True Spirit (Carleen Anderson album), 1994
- True Spirit (Ronnie Laws album), 1989
