= Ultra-Obscene =

Studio album by Breakbeat Era
- Released: 1999
- Studio: Studio Drum, Bristol
- Genre: Drum and bass
- Length: 74:10
- Label: XL
- Producer: Roni Size, DJ Die

Singles from Ultra-Obscene
- 1. "Breakbeat Era" Released: 1998; 2. "Ultra-Obscene" Released: 1999; 3. "Bullitproof" Released: 2000

Ultra-Obscene is the debut studio album by Breakbeat Era, a collaborative project consisting of Roni Size, DJ Die, and Leonie Laws. It was released on XL Recordings in 1999. It peaked at number 31 on the UK Albums Chart.

== Critical reception ==
Professional ratings
Review scores
| Source | Rating |
|---|---|
| AllMusic | 4/5 stars |
| CMJ New Music Monthly | favorable |
| CMJ New Music Report | favorable |
| Vibe | favorable |

Rick Anderson of AllMusic says, "Leonie Laws is not a tuneless singer, by any means, but her approach is more punk than pop, and the instrumental accompaniment is straight out of the 'darkcore' subgenre of drum'n'bass, a style typified by minor chords and creepy, robotic basslines." Laurence Phelan of The Independent called it "the first successful vocal d'n'b album."

== Track listing ==
All tracks are written by Roni Size, DJ Die, and Leonie Laws

| No. | Title | Length |
|---|---|---|
| 1. | "Past Life" | 5:24 |
| 2. | "Rancid" | 5:07 |
| 3. | "Ultra-Obscene" | 5:03 |
| 4. | "Bullitproof" | 4:33 |
| 5. | "Breakbeat Era" | 5:23 |
| 6. | "Time 4 Breaks" | 4:20 |
| 7. | "Late Morning" | 6:11 |
| 8. | "Anti-Everything" | 5:24 |
| 9. | "Animal Machine" | 3:03 |
| 10. | "Our Disease" | 5:52 |
| 11. | "Max" | 0:48 |
| 12. | "Control Freak" | 5:43 |
| 13. | "Terrible Funk" | 5:39 |
| 14. | "Sex Change" | 3:42 |
| 15. | "Life Is My Friend" | 7:59 |

== Personnel ==
Credits adapted from liner notes.

- Roni Size – production, mixing
- DJ Die – production, mixing
- Leonie Laws – vocals
- Roger Beaujolais – vibraphone (3, 15)
- Rob Chant – guitar (3)
- Jeff Rose – guitar (4, 12, 13)
- Adrian Utley – guitar (7)
- Richard Glover – bass guitar (4, 13)
- Toby Pascoe – drums (8)
- Max Sedgeley – drums (11)
- Dave Amso – engineering
- Andy Henderson – additional engineering
- Absolute – additional mixing
- Alex Jenkins – art direction, design, photography

== Charts ==
| Chart | Peak position |
|---|---|
| UK Albums (OCC) | 31 |
