= Mama Said =

Mama Said may refer to:

== Songs ==
- "Mama Said" (Lukas Graham song), a 2014 single
- "Mama Said" (Metallica song), a 1996 country rock ballad
- "Mama Said" (The Shirelles song), in 1961
- "Mama Said", a 2013 song by New Zealand boy band Moorhouse (band)
- "Mama Said", the third song from Carleen Anderson's 1994 album True Spirit

== Other ==
- Mama Said (album), the second studio album by American rock musician Lenny Kravitz
- "Mama Said", the 203rd episode of the American fantasy animated television series Adventure Time
