= New Forms =

Studio album by Roni Size & Reprazent
- Released: 23 June 1997
- Genre: Drum and bass
- Length: 139:54
- Label: Talkin' Loud; Mercury; Universal
- Producer: Roni Size; DJ Die; Krust; DJ Suv

Roni Size & Reprazent chronology
New Forms (1997)	In the Mode (2000)

Singles from New Forms
- 1. "Share the Fall" Released: 19 May 1997; 2. "Heroes" Released: 11 September 1997; 3. "Brown Paper Bag" Released: 27 October 1997; 4. "Watching Windows" Released: 28 April 1998

New Forms is the debut studio album by British drum and bass group Roni Size & Reprazent. It was released on 23 June 1997 through Talkin' Loud, and later re-released by Mercury Records and Universal Music Group. The album was released to critical and commercial success, winning the 1997 Mercury Prize, certifying platinum in the UK, and often being cited as their magnum opus.

New Forms was promoted by the release of its four singles, "Share the Fall", "Heroes", "Brown Paper Bag" and "Watching Windows", all of which entered the UK singles chart and featured vocals from Onallee. The album features production credits from Roni Size, Krust, DJ Die and Suv.

== Release ==
New Forms was preceded by a 1996 EP named Reasons for Sharing containing "Share the Fall", "Down", "Trust Me", and "Sounds Fresh", the former three of which were featured on the album. On 19 May 1997, the album's lead single was released, "Share the Fall", which reached number 37 in the UK singles chart in June that year. The album was released on 23 June 1997 and charted on the UK Albums Chart for 46 weeks, peaking at number 8. Following the album, three singles were released "Heroes", "Brown Paper Bag" and "Watching Windows", all charting at positions 31, 20 and 28 respectively, with "Brown Paper Bag" remaining the group's highest-charting single.

The album was released in various formats, all with differing track lists. The original album release was a two disc CD, though single disc editions only containing disc one were later released. The cassette version comprised the first disc of the CD. Two vinyl versions were released, a 5x and 4x LP. Of the two vinyl versions, the most common pressing is the 4LP version comprising most of the first CD; the 5×LP set includes tracks from the second CD, replacing "Intro" with "Heroes" and "Digital", which are appended to the end. In the US, only the 2CD version was released, which contained the bonus track "Electricks".

A remake of the original album, New Forms², was released in April 2008. Roni Size has described it as having a "new coat of armour added to the original tracks". The album contains four new songs: "Heart to Heart", "Less is More", "Don't Hold Back" and "Encore", while omitting several of the songs from the original album.

== Critical reception ==
Professional ratings
Review scores
Source	Rating
AllMusic	5/5 stars
Entertainment Weekly	A
The Guardian	4/5 stars
Los Angeles Times	3/4 stars
Muzik	10/10
NME	9/10
Pitchfork	7.7/10
Q	4/5 stars
Rolling Stone	3.5/5 stars
Spin	8/10

New Forms was released to favourable reviews. AllMusic described the album as "the major statement on drum'n'bass", rating it five stars out of five, while in 2010 BBC Music noted that it "carved a mainstream niche for drum and bass like no album before it". Entertainment Weekly noted the album's "caffeinated drum beat and blissful bass reverb". Pitchfork's Ryan Schreiber was less generous, commenting that the album "doesn't really get decent until the second half of disc one".

== Track listing ==
The original CD release contains both discs, though a single disc version containing only disc 1 was additionally released in the UK.

Disc 1 / Cassette
No.	Title	Writer(s)	Length
1.	"Railing"	Ryan Williams; Dominic Smith	2:05
2.	"Brown Paper Bag"	Williams	9:03
3.	"New Forms" (featuring Bahamadia)	Williams; Antonia Reed; Paul Southey	7:45
4.	"Let's Get It On"	Williams	6:57
5.	"Digital"	Williams; Onallee	9:05
6.	"Matter of Fact"	Williams	4:05
7.	"Mad Cat"	Williams	4:56
8.	"Heroes"	Williams; Onallee	6:35
9.	"Share the Fall" (Full Vocal Mix)	Williams; Onallee; Daniel Kausman; Kirk Thompson	6:13
10.	"Watching Windows"	Williams; Onallee	5:33
11.	"Beatbox"	Williams; Southey	1:09
12.	"Morse Code"	Williams	6:58
13.	"Destination"	Williams; Onallee; Ben Watt; Tracey Thorn	8:12

Disc 2
No.	Title	Writer(s)	Length
1.	"Intro"	Williams	0:54
2.	"Hi-Potent"	Williams	6:53
3.	"Trust Me"	Williams	6:26
4.	"Change My Life"	Williams	8:27
5.	"Share the Fall"	Williams; Onallee; Kausman; Thompson	6:26
6.	"Down"	Williams; Kausman	6:51
7.	"Jazz"	Williams; Southey	6:04
8.	"Hot Stuff"	Williams; Thompson	6:32
9.	"Ballet Dance"	Williams; Kausman	6:41
Total length:			139:54

US disc 2 bonus track
No.	Title	Writer(s)	Length
10.	"Electricks"	Williams	6:17

4x vinyl
No.	Title	Writer(s)	Length
1.	"Brown Paper Bag"	Williams	9:03
2.	"New Forms" (featuring Bahamadia)	Williams; Reed; Southey	7:45
3.	"Railing"	Williams; Smith	2:05
4.	"Let's Get It On"	Williams	6:57
5.	"Share the Fall" (Full Vocal Mix)	Williams; Onallee; Kausman; Thompson	6:13
6.	"Matter of Fact"	Williams	4:05
7.	"Mad Cat"	Williams	4:56
8.	"Morse Code"	Williams	6:58
9.	"Beatbox"	Williams; Southey	1:09
10.	"Destination"	Williams; Onallee; Watt; Thorn	8:12

5× vinyl
No.	Title	Writer(s)	Length
1.	"Hi-Potent"	Williams	6:53
2.	"Trust Me"	Williams	6:26
3.	"Change My Life"	Williams	8:27
4.	"Share the Fall"	Williams; Onallee; Kausman; Thompson	6:26
5.	"Down"	Williams; Kausman	6:51
6.	"Jazz"	Williams; Southey	6:04
7.	"Hot Stuff"	Williams; Thompson	6:32
8.	"Ballet Dance"	Williams; Kausman	6:41
9.	"Heroes" (Album Version)	Williams; Onallee	6:35
10.	"Digital"	Williams; Onallee	9:05

New Forms²
No.	Title	Writer(s)	Length
1.	"Railings"	Williams; Smith	2:05
2.	"Brown Paper Bag"	Williams	3:46
3.	"New Forms"	Williams; Reed; Suv	4:47
4.	"Let's Get It On"	Williams	1:41
5.	"Trust Me"	Williams	5:03
6.	"Digital"	Williams; Onallee	6:35
7.	"Matter of Fact"	Williams	3:57
8.	"Heroes"	Williams; Onallee	4:14
9.	"Share the Fall" (Full Vocal Mix)	Williams; Onallee; Kausman; Thompson	6:09
10.	"Heart to Heart"	Williams; Onallee	4:51
11.	"Less Is More"	Williams; Southey	6:15
12.	"Down"	Williams; Kausman	5:12
13.	"Hi-Potent"	Williams	5:08
14.	"Don't Hold Back"	Williams; Smith	2:57
15.	"Beatbox"	Williams; Southey	1:09
16.	"Encore"	Williams	4:31
17.	"Destination"	Williams; Onallee; Watt; Thorn	3:51

== Personnel ==
Adapted from the liner notes.

- Roni Size (Ryan Williams) – writing, production, keyboards
- Onallee (Tracey Bowen) – vocals, writing
- Dynamite MC (Dominic Smith) – vocals, writing
- DJ Die (Daniel Kausman) – writing, production
- DJ Suv (Paul Southey) – writing, production
- Krust (Kirk Thompson) – writing, production
- Clive Deamer – drums
- Steve Graham - guitar
- Si John – bass
- Bahamadia (Antonia Reed) – vocals
- Tyrrell – guitar
- Adrian Place – saxophone
- Róisín Murphy – vocals (sampled)
- Intro. London – design
- Vikki Jackman – photography

== Accolades ==
Accolades for New Forms
Year	Organisation	Award	Result	Ref.
1997	Mercury Prize	Mercury Album of the Year	Won	.

== Charts ==
=== Weekly charts ===
Weekly chart performance for New Forms
Chart (1997–1998)	Peak position
Netherlands (MegaCharts)	96
New Zealand (Recorded Music NZ)	37
UK Albums Chart (Official Charts Company)	8
US Heatseekers Albums (Billboard)	36

=== Year-end charts ===
1997 year-end chart performance for New Forms
Chart (1997)	Position
UK Albums (OCC)	89

== Certifications ==
Certifications for New Forms
Region	Certification	Certified units/sales
United Kingdom (BPI)	Platinum	300,000^{*}
^{*} Sales figures based on certification alone.
