= A Joyful Noise Unto The Creator =

Studio album by Galliano
- Released: 8 June 1992
- Genre: Acid jazz
- Length: 53:12
- Label: Talkin' Loud

Galliano chronology
In Pursuit of the 13th Note (1991)	A Joyful Noise Unto The Creator (1992)	The Plot Thickens (1994)

A Joyful Noise Unto The Creator is the second album by United Kingdom acid jazz group Galliano. It was released on Gilles Peterson's Talkin' Loud record label on 8 June 1992. The album reached number 28 in the UK Albums Chart.

== Critical reception ==
Professional ratings
Review scores
Source	Rating
Calgary Herald	B

The Calgary Herald praised the "good vibes, funkified, reggae-tried, soul-inside rap."

== Track listing ==
No.	Title	Writing credit	Length
1.	"Grounation Part 1"	Rob Gallagher, Crispin Robinson, Constantine Weir	3:50
2.	"Jus' Reach"	Gallagher, Robinson, Weir	4:13
3.	"Skunk Funk"	Gallagher, Robinson, Weir	4:14
4.	"Earth Boots"	Gallagher, Robinson, Weir	2:05
5.	"Phantom"	Gallagher, Robinson, Weir	2:30
6.	"Jazz?"	Gallagher, Robinson, Weir, Mick Talbot	4:27
7.	"New World Order"	Gallagher, Robinson, Weir	4:20
8.	"So Much Confusion"	Gallagher, Robinson, Weir, Talbot	4:46
9.	"Totally Together"	Gallagher, Robinson, Weir, Jim Mittoo	3:54
10.	"Golden Flower"	Gallagher, Robinson, Weir, Talbot	4:41
11.	"Prince of Peace"	Gallagher, Robinson, Weir, L.Thomas	4:20
12.	"Grounation Part 2"	Gallagher, Robinson, Weir	3:21

== Charts ==
Chart performance for A Joyful Noise Unto The Creator
Chart (1993)	Peak position
Australian Albums (ARIA)	152

== Release history ==
Region	Date	Label	Format	Catalog
United Kingdom	8 June 1992	Talkin' Loud (Phonogram Records)	LP	848080-1
United Kingdom	8 June 1992	Talkin' Loud (Phonogram Records)	CD	848080-2
United Kingdom	8 June 1992	Talkin' Loud (Phonogram Records)	MC	848080-4
Japan	8 June 1992	Talkin' Loud (Phonogram Records)	CD	PHCR-34
