= The Plot Thickens (Galliano album) =

Studio album by Galliano
- Released: 27 May 1994
- Genre: Acid jazz
- Length: 1:08:07
- Label: Talkin' Loud
- Producer: Adam Moseley/Galliano

Galliano chronology
A Joyful Noise Unto The Creator (1992)	The Plot Thickens (1994)	:4 (1996)

Professional ratings
Review scores
Source	Rating
AllMusic	4/5 stars
Music Week	3/5 stars

The Plot Thickens is the third studio album by United Kingdom acid jazz group Galliano. It was released in the UK on Gilles Peterson's Talkin' Loud record label on 27 May 1994. It was placed at number 44 in NME's list of the Top 50 Albums of 1994.

== Critical reception ==
Trouser Press wrote that the album "more skillfully integrates the rich multi-cultural vibe into an original, complete style." The Chicago Tribune wrote that "listening to [The Plot Thickens] is truly an uplifting experience, with Rob Gallagher's rapping and Valerie Etienne's soulful vocals nicely complementing each other."

== Track listing ==
No.	Title	Writing credit	Length
1.	"Was This The Time"	Rob Gallagher, Crispin Robinson	2:01
2.	"Blood Lines"	Gallagher, Robinson	7:22
3.	"Rise and Fall"	Gallagher, Robinson, Mick Talbot	5:29
4.	"Twyford Down"	Gallagher, Talbot	6:56
5.	"What Colour Our Flag (Part 1)"	Gallagher	5:21
6.	"Cold Wind"	Gallagher	6:10
7.	"Down in the Gulley"	Gallagher, Talbot	4:54
8.	"Long Time Gone (album version)"	David Crosby (additional lyrics by Gallagher)	6:19
9.	"Believe"	Gallagher, Robinson	5:38
10.	"Do You Hear"	Gallagher	5:19
11.	"Travels The Road"	Gallagher, Robinson	3:51
12.	"Better All The Time"	Gallagher	5:41
13.	"Little One"	Gallagher	3:06

== Charts ==
Chart performance for The Plot Thickens
Chart (1994)	Peak position
Australian Albums (ARIA)	103

== Release history ==
Region	Date	Label	Format	Catalog
United Kingdom	27 May 1994	Talkin' Loud (Phonogram Records)	LP	522 452-1
United Kingdom	27 May 1994	Talkin' Loud (Phonogram Records)	CD	522 452-2
US	13 September 1994	Mercury Records	CD	314 522 452-2
US	13 September 1994	Mercury Records	MC	314 522 452
Japan	30 January 2002	Universal/PolyGram	CD	1263
