= Ease Your Mind =

Ease Your Mind may refer to:

== Songs ==
- "Ease Your Mind", by Status Quo from Blue for You, 1976
- "Ease Your Mind", by Gallliano from 4, 1996
- "Ease Your Mind", by the Sunshine Band, 1998
- "Ease Your Mind", by Wide Mouth Mason from Stew, 2000
- "Ease Your Mind", by Goapele from Even Closer, 2002
- "Ease Your Mind", by Los Amigos Invisibles from The Venezuelan Zinga Son, Vol. 1, 2002
- "Ease Your Mind", by Matthew Mayfield from Breathe Out in Black, 2010
- "Ease Your Mind", by Blu & Exile from Give Me My Flowers While I Can Still Smell Them, 2012
- "Ease Your Mind", from Soundman Vol. 1

== Other uses ==
- Ease Your Mind, a 2005 album by Sioen
