= Touching Down =

Studio album by Roni Size
- Released: 21 October 2002
- Genre: Drum and bass
- Label: Full Cycle Records

Roni Size chronology
In the Møde (with Reprazent) (2000)	Touching Down (2002)	Return to V (2004)

Professional ratings
Review scores
Source	Rating
AllMusic	3/5 stars
The New Rolling Stone Album Guide	2/5 stars
Pitchfork	3.5/10

Touching Down is the first solo studio album by the drum and bass DJ Roni Size. It was released in 2002 by Full Cycle Records.

== Critical reception ==
CMJ New Music Monthly wrote that while "Size still rocks harder than most junglists, he rarely vaults over the genre's limitations here." Billboard called it a "fluid set that moves from track to track with little or no delineation."

== Track listing ==
All tracks are written by Roni Size.

No.	Title	Length
1.	"Sound Advice"	4:25
2.	"Forget Me Knots"	4:16
3.	"Playtime"	0:53
4.	"Scrambled Eggs"	2:29
5.	"Uncensored"	5:01
6.	"At the Movies"	2:50
7.	"Vocoda Funk"	4:15
8.	"Sorry for You"	6:03
9.	"Feel the Heat"	4:52
10.	"Siren Sounds"	3:22
11.	"Keep Strong"	2:00
12.	"Find Myself"	1:55
13.	"Reel Dark One"	4:57
14.	"Swings and Roundabouts"	5:40
15.	"Zak Attak"	4:24
16.	"Snapshots 3"	5:25
