= In Pursuit of the 13th Note =

Studio album by Galliano
- Released: 25 March 1991
- Recorded: May–June 1990
- Genre: Acid jazz
- Length: 66:47
- Label: Talkin' Loud
- Producer: Chris Bangs (Thin Air Productions)

Galliano chronology
In Pursuit of the 13th Note (1991)	A Joyful Noise Unto The Creator (1992)

In Pursuit of the 13th Note is the debut album by United Kingdom acid jazz group Galliano. It was released on Gilles Peterson's Talkin' Loud record label on 25 March 1991. Although a studio album, the performances were recorded live.

== Track listing ==
No.	Title	Writing credit	Length
1.	"Leg in the Sea of History"	Rob Galliano	3:50
2.	"Welcome to the Story"	Galliano	4:13
3.	"Coming on Strong"	Galliano, Chris Bangs	4:14
4.	"Sweet Like Your Favourite Gears"	Galliano	2:05
5.	"Cemetary [sic] of Drums (Theme From Buhaina)"	Galliano	2:30
6.	"Five Sons of the Mother"	Galliano, Bangs	4:27
7.	"Storm Clouds Gather"	Galliano, Bangs	4:20
8.	"Nothing has Changed"	Galliano, Bangs	4:46
9.	"57th Minute of the 23rd Hour"	Galliano	3:54
10.	"Power and Glory"	Galliano	4:41
11.	"Stoned Again"	Galliano	4:20
12.	"Reviewing The Situation"	Galliano, Crispin "Spry" Robinson	3:21
13.	"Little Ghetto Boy"	Galliano	4:24
14.	"Me My mike My lyrics"	Galliano, Bangs	4:19
15.	"Love Bomb"	Galliano	1:31
16.	"Power and Glory (Live Jazz Mix)"	Galliano	4:18
17.	"Welcome to the Story (A Good Mix)"	Galliano	6:08

== Charts ==
Chart performance for In Pursuit of the 13th Note
Chart (1993)	Peak position
Australian Albums (ARIA)	177

== Release history ==
Region	Date	Label	Format	Catalog
United Kingdom	25 March 1991	Talkin' Loud (Phonogram Records)	CD	848493-2
