= 4 (Galliano album) =

:4

Studio album by Galliano
- Released: 19 August 1996
- Genre: Acid jazz
- Label: Talkin' Loud/Mercury Records
- Producer: Demus and Ski Oakenfull

Galliano chronology
| The Plot Thickens (1994) | :4 (1996) |

:4 is the fourth studio album by United Kingdom acid jazz group Galliano. It was released in the UK on Gilles Peterson's Talkin' Loud imprint on Mercury Records on 19 August 1996. A single from the album, "Slack Hands" was used in the title sequence of Kevin Reynolds' 1997 film One Eight Seven, starring Samuel L. Jackson. Another single from the album "Ease Your Mind" was released from the album, with the promo video flimed with Rob Gallagher and Valerie Etienne flying around Barcelona.

== Track listing ==
All tracks are written by Rob Gallagher & Dominic Oakenfull, except where noted.

| No. | Title | Writer(s) | Length |
|---|---|---|---|
| 1. | "Who Ate the Fly (Gonna Getcha)" | | 4:31 |
| 2. | "Ease Your Mind" | Gallagher; Oakenfull; Valerie Etienne | 5:36 |
| 3. | "Slack Hands" | Gallagher; Oakenfull; Etienne | 4:42 |
| 4. | "Roofing Tiles" | Gallagher | 3:47 |
| 5. | "Slightly Frayed" | Gallagher | 3:53 |
| 6. | "Best Lives of Our Days" (featuring Red Snapper) | | 4:46 |
| 7. | "Thunderhead" | | 4:07 |
| 8. | "Freefall" | | 4:37 |
| 9. | "Some Come" | | 4:50 |
| 10. | "Funny How" | Gallagher | 4:20 |
| 11. | "Western Front" | Gallagher | 4:20 |
| 12. | "Who's in Charge" | | 5:51 |
| 13. | "Battles are Brewing (Reprise)" | | 1:17 |

== Release history ==
| Region | Date | Label | Format | Catalog |
|---|---|---|---|---|
| United Kingdom | 19 August 1996 | Talkin' Loud (Phonogram Records) | LP | 532 811-4 |
| United Kingdom | 19 August 1996 | Talkin' Loud (Phonogram Records) | CD | 531 811-2 |
