= Breakbeat Era =

British drum and bass music group

- Origin: Bristol, England
- Genres: Drum and bass
- Years active: 1998–1999
- Label: XL Recordings
- Past members: Roni Size; DJ Die; Leonie Laws

Breakbeat Era was a British music group from Bristol. It consisted of producers Roni Size and DJ Die and singer Leonie Laws. The group released a studio album, Ultra-Obscene, in 1999. It peaked at number 31 on the UK Albums Chart.

== Discography ==
=== Studio albums ===
- Ultra-Obscene (1999)

=== Singles ===
- "Breakbeat Era" (1998)
- "Ultra-Obscene" (1999)
- "Bullitproof" (2000)
