= Young Disciples =

UK musical group

Young Disciples was a British-American acid jazz band, formed in London in 1990 by Carleen Anderson (vocals and keyboards), Marco Nelson (bass, guitar and organ) and Femi Williams (percussion and programming).

Their most notable hit was the single "Apparently Nothin'" (Talkin' Loud, 1991), which helped launch Anderson's solo career when the band disbanded.

== History ==
The group formed in July 1990 after the American-born Anderson and her young son, Bobby, relocated to London, and met Nelson. They signed to Talkin' Loud Records and released their first single, "Get Yourself Together". It reached No. 68 in the UK Singles Chart in October 1990. This was followed by "Apparently Nothin'", which became a No. 13 UK hit and brought them to national attention. An album followed, Road to Freedom (1991), and prompted their record label to cash in on by releasing a remixed version of "Get Yourself Together".

In 1992, the group appeared on the Red Hot Organization's dance compilation album, Red Hot + Dance, contributing an original track, "Apparently Nothin' (The Re-Rub)". The album attempted to raise awareness and money in support of the AIDS epidemic, and all proceeds were donated to AIDS charities.

The group were part of the burgeoning acid jazz scene; according to the book The Techno Primer, setting "the tone for this movement", but also maintained links with the British hip hop genre, with many up and coming rappers of the day recording with them—MC Mell'O', Outlaw Posse and Masta Ace all guested on tracks over their career. The group also remixed tracks for other artists, although in reality this was usually either Nelson or Williams or both.

The Road to Freedom album was co-produced, recorded and mixed by Dilip Harris/Demus at Solid Bond Studios (Paul Weller's personal studio) with guests Fred Wesley, Maceo Parker, Mick Talbot, Paul Weller, Steve White, Max Beesley, and IG Culture. It reached No. 21 on the UK Albums Chart.

Anderson left the group in 1992, using the success of "Apparently Nothin'", to earn herself a solo recording contract with the larger Virgin Records company. Following this, the group disbanded, although the name was still used for remix production for many years. Nelson and Williams continued to work behind the scenes in the music industry.

In 1999, a new version of "Apparently Nothin'" was released with Carleen Anderson and the Brand New Heavies.

== Discography ==
=== Albums ===
- Road to Freedom (Talkin' Loud, 1991) – UK No. 21, AUS No. 117

=== Singles and EPs ===
- "Get Yourself Together" (1990) – UK No. 68
- "Apparently Nothin'" (1991) – UK No. 13
- "Get Yourself Together" (reissue) (1991) – UK No. 65, AUS No. 171
- Young Disciples (EP) (1992) – UK No. 48 AUS No. 179
