= Carleen Anderson =

American soul singer (born 1957)

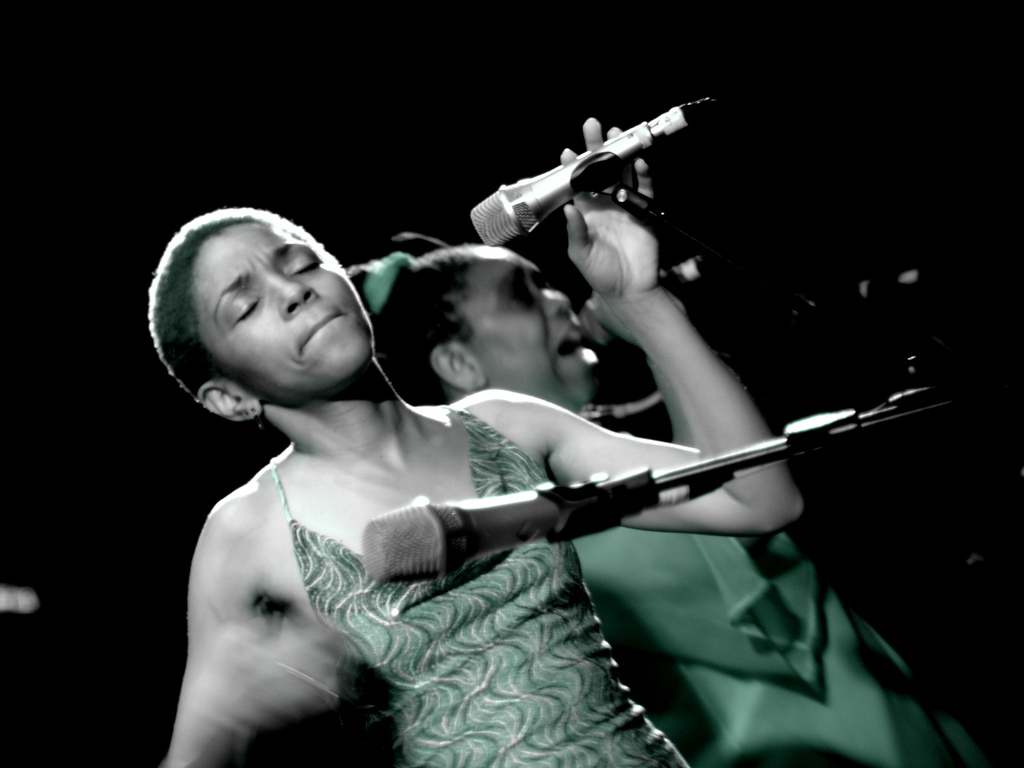

Background information
- Also known as: Mardou Fox
- Born: Carleen Cassandra Anderson; May 10, 1957 (age 69); Houston, Texas, U.S.
- Genres: R&B; soul; funk; gospel
- Occupation: Musician
- Years active: 1990–present
- Labels: Phonogram/Talkin' Loud; Virgin; Dusky Sappho; Orange Room Music; DOME; Freestyle Records
- Formerly of: Young Disciples; Brand New Heavies
- Website: melioropusgriot.com

Carleen Cassandra Anderson (born May 10, 1957 in Houston, Texas) is an American musician based in the United Kingdom where she has lived since 1990. She was the vocalist, composer, and musician for the Young Disciples and is known for her numerous, varied collaborations. Her solo career began in 1992. She is credited with composing and writing futuristic operas.

By the time Anderson was three years old, she was singing solos in front of the congregation. At age seven, she was composing songs, playing piano by ear and directing the choir where her Paternal Grandfather, Reverend David Anderson, was the Pastor at Anderson Memorial Church of God in Christ. Anderson’s vocal skills were influenced by her paternal aunt, Betty Faye Anderson, a Juilliard scholar, a Gospel singer and a soprano soloist in the Chicago Symphony Orchestra.

== Education ==
After a brief marriage that resulted in the 1979 birth of her son, Bobby Anderson, Carleen Anderson lived as a divorced single mother in Los Angeles. She received several scholarships to study classical and jazz music performance, as well as music education, at Los Angeles City College (LACC) and the University of Southern California (USC). Anderson also studied Creative Literature at the University of California in Los Angeles (UCLA). During her studies, Anderson worked as a student tutor to support herself and her child. Anderson's goal at the time was to become a teacher of music, but her plans were thwarted when the Ronald Reagan administration removed Arts from the curriculum in government-sponsored schools. As this happened when Anderson had only one semester left to complete her music teaching degree, it resulted in her having to take office clerk employment in order to make ends meet.

== Career ==
Anderson's first solo recording contract was with Virgin Records' Circa label. The initial marketing release was the EP Dusky Sappho in 1993. Her debut album True Spirit, released in 1994, had pop chart success with the single releases "Mama Said", "Let It Last" and "Nervous Breakdown".

Anderson's 1998 second solo album, Blessed Burden, gained commercial recognition with the singles "Woman in Me" and a cover of Paul McCartney's "Maybe I'm Amazed".

Alberta's Granddaughter is Anderson's first independent and third solo album, released in 2002 on her own label, Dusky Sappho. This work includes a cover of Oasis's "Don't Look Back in Anger".

Anderson's fourth solo album, Grace and Favours, was recorded live at The Glee Club in Birmingham, England. It was released in 2003 by Orange Room Music on CD and DVD formats with clips that include interviews and impromptu performances with James Brown and Paul Weller.

Universal Records released her fifth solo offering, Up to Now, in 2004. It is a compilation of songs over her career up to that date.

Her sixth album, Soul Providence, was released on Dome Records in 2005. It features her song "My Door Is Open", which was remixed by Richard Earnshaw in 2010 as a dance floor production and included on Earnshaw's album, In Time.

From 2002 to 2007, Anderson taught and was Head of the Vocal Department at the Brighton Institute of Modern Music (BIMM). She had a bi-annual residency at Ronnie Scott's Jazz Club in Soho, performing from 2006 to 2015. She sang a varied repertoire of jazz classics, musical theatre and unreleased material, as well as her commercial hits. In March 2007, in celebration of International Women's Day, Anderson had the honour of singing for Her Majesty the Queen.

In 2014, Arts Council England awarded Anderson a grant to produce her tribal opera Cage Street Memorial. In 2015, she also received a grant from PRS Women Make Music to record her compositions from Cage Street Memorial, released as her seventh album on Freestyle Records in 2016. A Barbican Theatre stage production of the album in 2018 earned her a JazzFM Innovation of the Year nomination.

In 2019, Anderson became an Associate Artist at Hall for Cornwall in Truro. She was Choir Director for the BBC Singers and UK Vocal Assembly at the Royal Albert Hall for the August 2019 "Sacred Music" tribute to Duke Ellington at the BBC Proms and contributed to the performance as vocal arranger and curator. In June 2020, Anderson composed the music and was the featured vocalist and narrator for the BBC Radio 4 adaptation of Harlem Renaissance author Jean Toomer's 1923 novel Cane, Drama of the Week in the BBC Sounds Electric Decade series.

== Recent work ==
In March 2020, Arts Council England awarded Anderson a grant to develop her second theatre piece, MELIOR Opus Griot, in partnership with Hall for Cornwall, Falmouth University and its Academy of Music and Theatre Arts (AMATA). Due to COVID-19 restrictions, the music from this ocean-themed time-travel fantasy was released online in anticipation of its live premiere and subsequent tour. MELIOR introduced Anderson's new music performance style, Opus Griot, a blend of storytelling, singing, poetry, visual art and music ensemble accompaniment. This was followed by a successful staged preview at Cornwall Playhouse in November 2022. The end of May 2025 saw Anderson bid an official farewell to her Soul Music live performances with her participation in the Good Times tribute to Norman Jay MBE at London's Royal Festival Hall. A few days later, in early June 2025, London's premiere of the SXSW Festival provided a platform presented by Black Lives in Music at The Ditch in Shoreditch Town Hall for her to showcase her blended-roots opera, MELIOR Opus Griot. Bill Bankes-Jones, founder and director of Tête-á-Tête Opera Festival, supported Anderson as the interview host at the esteemed event. Inspired by the enthusiastic response from the professional impresarios in the audience, Anderson continues to progress with the development of MELIOR Opus Griot for the stage and its audio recordings.

== Personal life ==
Carleen Anderson is the daughter of singer Vicki Anderson (a.k.a. Myra Myrtle Barnes), stepdaughter of Bobby Byrd and goddaughter of James Brown. Vicki Anderson met Bobby Byrd when she became a featured singer on James Brown’s shows in the 1960s. Vicki Anderson married Bobby Byrd, a musician, producer and bandleader in his own right, who was also a childhood friend of James Brown. Bobby Byrd is credited with forming a music group with James Brown called the Flames, which was later named James Brown and the Famous Flames.

Carleen's father, Dr. Reuben Anderson Sr., is pastor of the Tower of Faith Evangelistic Church of God in Christ, in Compton, California.

Carleen's uncle, David Anderson Jr., and his daughters, Pamela and Jhelisa, along with their mother, Yvonne, had a very successful family gospel vocal group that travelled the southern United States during the 1960s and 1970s.

Carleen Anderson has one son, singer-songwriter/music producer and music lecturer, Bobby Anderson (a.k.a. Wilderman), who has one daughter, Carleen's granddaughter, Atari.

== Discography ==
=== With Young Disciples ===
- Road to Freedom (Talkin' Loud, 1991)

=== Solo albums ===
- Dusky Sappho EP (Circa/Virgin, 1994) No. 38 (this EP was classed as a mini-album as it had too many tracks on it to chart as a single)
- True Spirit (Circa/Virgin, 1994) UK No. 12
- True Spirit - Remixes (Circa/Virgin, 1995)
- Blessed Burden (Circa/Virgin, 1998) UK No. 51
- Alberta's Granddaughter (Dusky Sappho Music, 2002)
- Grace and Favours (live performance DVD/CD, 2004)
- Up to Now: The Best Of (Virgin, 2004)
- Soul Providence (Dome, 2005)
- CAGE STREET MEMORIAL - The Pilgrimage (Freestyle, 2016)

=== Solo singles ===
- "Nervous Breakdown" (1994), UK No. 27
- "Mama Said" (1994), UK No. 26
- "True Spirit" (1994), UK No. 24
- "Let It Last" (1995), UK No. 16
- "Maybe I'm Amazed" (1998), UK No. 24
- "Woman in Me" (1998), UK No. 74
- "Don't Look Back in Anger" (2002)

=== As Mardou Fox ===
- Subterraneans featuring Mardou Fox - "Taurus Woman" (1993)
- Numbers - "Ballad of Mardou Fox", "Traffic", "Mardous Lament", "Jack Summerset" (2001)

=== Collaborations ===
- Duet with Omar - "Who Chooses the Seasons" (1992)
- Guru - "Sights in the City" from Guru's Jazzmatazz, Vol. 1 (1993)
- Incognito - "Trouble Don't Always Last" (1994) (with Ramsey Lewis)
- Duet with Lewis Taylor - "18 with a Bullet" (1998)
- Red, Hot + Cool documentary (1998)
- The Brand New Heavies - "Saturday Nite", "Apparently Nothing", "Try My Love" and "Swinging Big Tom"
- London Community Gospel Choir - "Whenever You Call" (2001)
- Agent K. - "Ride Away Getaway" (2002)
- Andy Hamill - "Falling" (2003) (with Tony Woods)
- Full Flava - "Stories" and "You Are (My Destiny)" from Colour of My Soul (2003)
- London Community Gospel Choir - "I Surrender All" (2003)
- Courtney Pine - "When the World Turns Blue" (2003)
- Mamayo - "The Game" and "Born to Love" (2005)
- Hope Collective - "Give and Let Live" (2005)
- Duet with Paul Weller - "Wanna Be Where You Are" (2005)
- Duet with Jocelyn Brown - "Parting the Waters" (2005)
- Incognito - "Show Me Love" (2005)
- Incognito - "Summer in the City", "Tin Man" and "That's the Way of the World" (2006)
- "Beautiful Sadness", co-written with Shuya Okino (2006)
- Full Flava - "Was That All It Was" (Jean Carne cover) from Music Is Our Way of Life (2007)
- "Bird in Flight", co-written with Gil Cang on Tuff Scout Records (2014)
- "Grains of Dust", Welsh National Opera Songs of Occupation Protest (2014)
