= Roni Size & Reprazent =

British drum and bass group

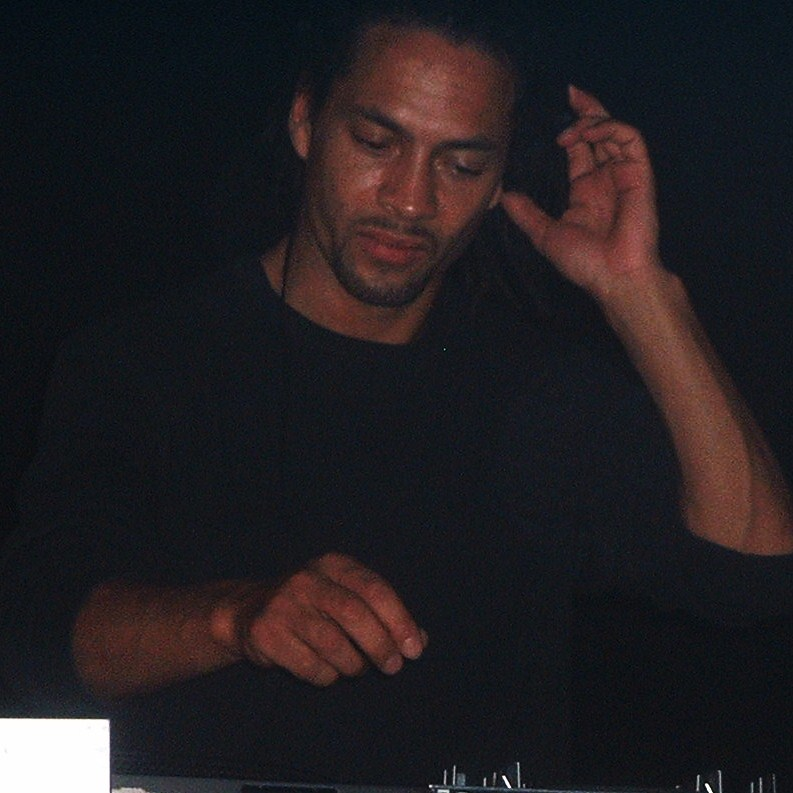
- The group's frontman Roni Size in 2005

Background information
- Origin: England, United Kingdom
- Genre: Drum and bass
- Years active: 1996–present
- Labels: Talkin' Loud; Mercury; Universal
- Members: Roni Size; Onallee; Dynamite MC
- Past members: DJ Die; Krust; DJ Suv; Clive Deamer; Rob Merrill; Yuval Gabay; Pete Josef

Roni Size & Reprazent (stylised as Roni Size / Reprazent) are a British drum and bass group fronted by Roni Size. Their debut album New Forms won the Mercury Music Prize in 1997. Their follow-up album In the Mode featured artists including Rahzel, Zack de la Rocha of Rage Against the Machine and Method Man.

== History ==
In April 1997, Roni Size & Reprazent had their live debut at Tribal Gathering. Roni Size created the group to perform live tracks he had been working on in the studio. The group included Full Cycle record label members Roni Size, Krust, Die, DJ Suv, operating 'banks of equipment'; as well as Dynamite MC (vocals), Onallee (vocals), Si John (bass) and Clive Deamer (drums) taking centre stage.

The group's debut studio album, New Forms, was released on 23 June 1997, with singles featuring the vocals of Onallee including "Brown Paper Bag", "Heroes", "Share the Fall" and "Watching Windows". The album went five times platinum, won the Mercury Prize, and Roni Size returned to the studio to concentrate on his output for V and Full Cycle and Dope Dragon.

On 9 October 2000, Roni Size & Reprazent released their follow-up second studio album, In the Mode, released with singles "Who Told You", "Dirty Beats" and "Lucky Pressure".

=== New Forms (deluxe), 2008–2013 ===
Roni Size resurrected Reprazent in 2008 with the release of a deluxe edition of New Forms on Universal, but in September 2008 announced his intention to disband the act following a third album.

The band started 2009 with a tour of Australia as part of the Good Vibrations Festival. Following on from this, Roni Size and Reprazent returned to North America for the first time in seven years as one of the headliners at the 2009 Ultra Music Festival in Miami. They then went on to perform at Coachella, appearing as the final act of the festival.

In September 2009, Roni Size & Reprazent played a gig with an orchestra and choir to mark the re-opening of Bristol's Colston Hall, collaborating with the BBC's Nature's Great Events composer, William Goodchild. In addition to older material, the band played material from a forthcoming Roni Size & Reprazent album.

=== Live shows, 2014–present ===
The band reformed circa 2014, with original members Roni Size, Dynamite MC, Onallee and Si John (bass). Additional artists included Yuval Gabay (Soul Coughing), D Product, Jay Wilcox and Pete Josef. Roni Size & Reprazent toured several large festivals in Europe including Bestival, Glastonbury, Lovebox, Exit and Rock Herk. They were amongst the nominations for best dance act from the UK Festival Awards.

Also in 2015, a recording of the 2009 collaboration with William Goodchild & The Emerald Ensemble was released.

In 2017, a new reissue of New Forms was released including more material (the CD version consisted of four discs).

== Musical style ==
The group's music has been described as "meticulously crafted break-beats that, when slowed down, revealed themselves as hip-hop beats". The most popular track, “Brown Paper Bag”, was praised in The Guardian as a “masterpiece: an essay in hyper-kinetic pace, it piles up teetering stacks of instrumental layers, their cumulative weight triggering each step in a constant cycle of demolition and reconstruction of its latticework of melody, rhythm and mood".

Much of the acclaim centred on Size's melding of the propulsive jungle beats accompanied by live drums and double bass. The band consists of Williams (compositions/programming), DJ Krust, Onallee (vocals), Dynamite MC and rapper Bahamadia (a former protégée of Gang Starr). Reprazent's drum and bass is equally blended from hip hop, funk, soul and house.

== Members ==
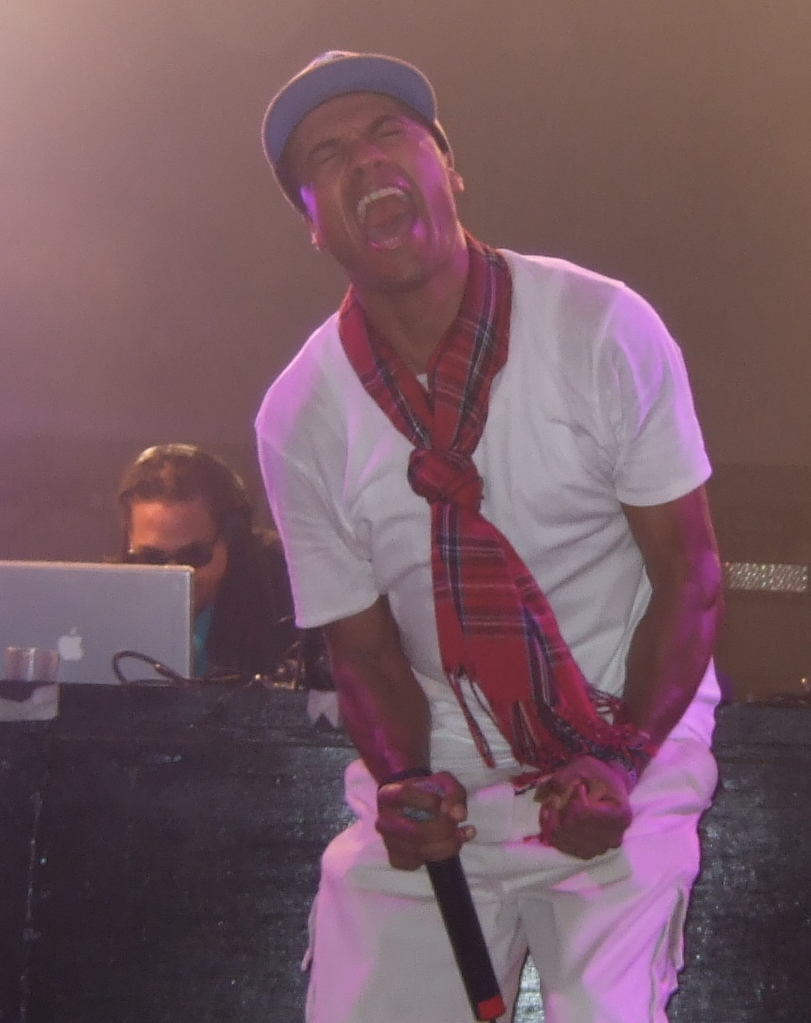
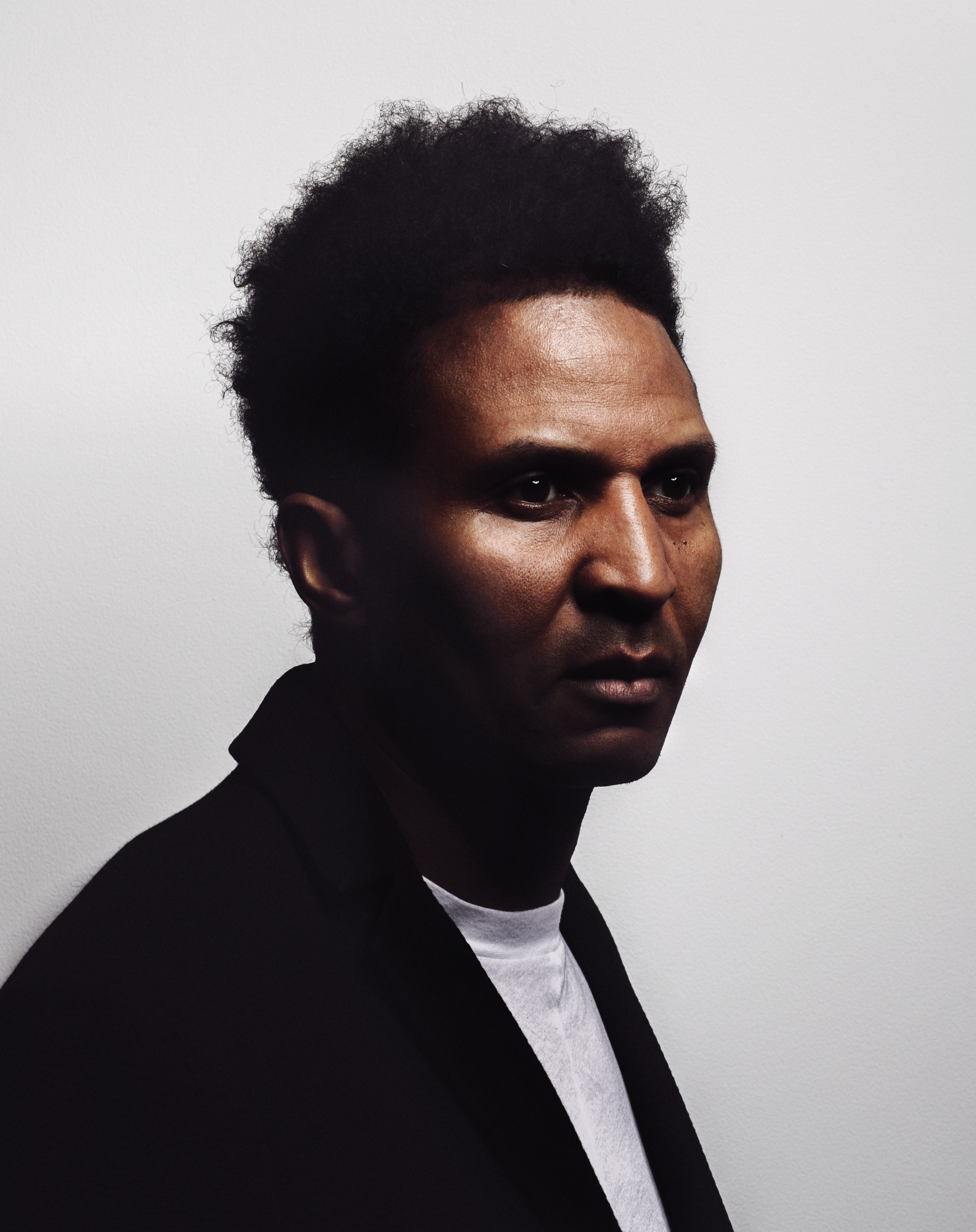
Dynamite MC (left) and Krust (right) have been members of the group

=== Current ===
- Roni Size (Ryan Williams) – programming/production/keyboards
- Onallee (Tracey Bowen) – vocals
- Dynamite MC (Dominic Smith) – raps
- Si John – electric and upright bass
- D Product (Dave Maso, Dave Amso) – synthesiser
- Jay Wilcox – keyboard

=== Former ===
- DJ Die (Daniel Kausman) – programming/production
- DJ Suv (Paul Southey) – programming/production
- Krust (Kirk Thompson) – programming/production
- Clive Deamer – drums (now with Radiohead & Portishead)
- Rob Merrill – drums (Massive Attack)
- Yuval Gabay – drums (Soul Coughing)
- Pete Josef – guitar
- Richie Pym - Guitar ( share the fall 2008, centre of the storm )

== Discography ==
Studio albums

- New Forms (1997)
- In the Mode (2000)

== Awards and nominations ==
Year	Association	Category	Nominee / Work	Result	Ref.
1997	Mercury Prize	Mercury Album of the Year	New Forms	Won	
1997	MOBO Awards	Best Jungle Act	Roni Size & Reprazent	Won	
