= Roni Size =

British DJ & music producer (born 1969)

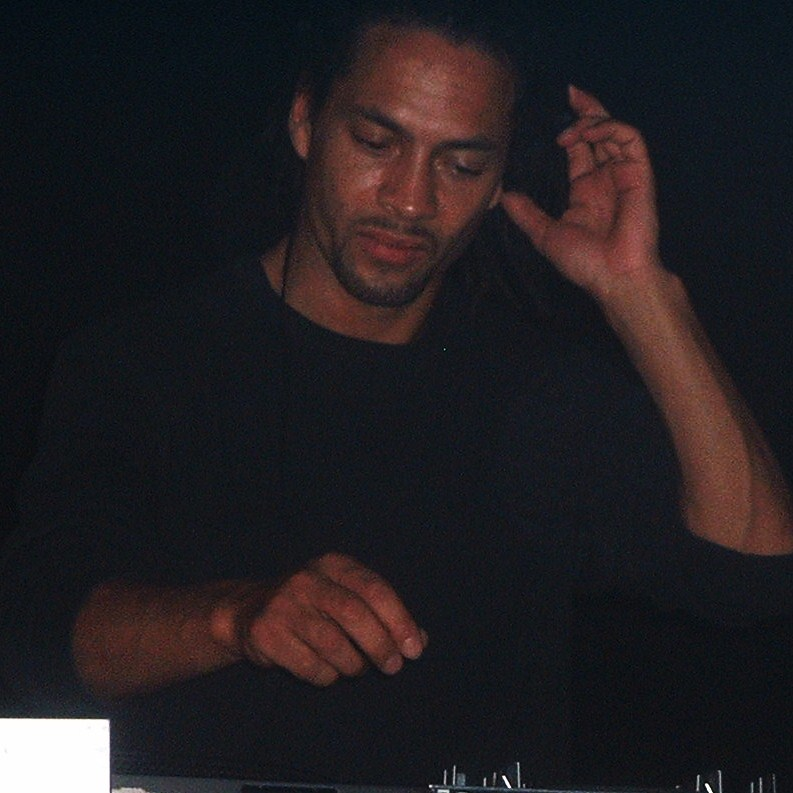
- Roni Size at the Savoy, Cork, 2005

Background information
- Also known as: Firefox; Hokuspokus; Mask
- Born: Ryan Owen Granville Williams; 29 October 1969 (age 56); Bristol, England
- Genres: Drum and bass; jungle; big beat; hip hop
- Occupations: DJ; record producer
- Years active: 1988–present
- Labels: V; Full Cycle; Dope Dragon
- Website: ronisize.co.uk

Ryan Owen Granville Williams (born 29 October 1969), better known by his stage name Roni Size, is an English DJ and record producer. He came to prominence in 1997 as the founder and frontman of Roni Size & Reprazent, a drum and bass collective. That year they won the Mercury Prize for their debut studio album New Forms.

== Biography ==
=== Early life ===
Williams, son of Jamaican immigrants, grew up in the Bristol suburb of St. Andrews. He cites reggae as one of his early influences. He was expelled from school at the age of 16 and started attending house parties run by Bristol soundsystem The Wild Bunch (a predecessor of Massive Attack). He learned the basics about music production at his local youth club, the Sefton Park basement project, which provided record players, a mixing desk, drum machines and samplers. He worked with his brother's comprehensive collection of Studio One records and later set up a home studio, buying a sampler.

=== Full Cycle Records and WTP ===
His future musical partner, Krust, had been a member of the Fresh 4, whose "Wishing on a Star" reached the Top 10 of the UK singles chart in late 1989. Williams, Krust, Suv and DJ Die founded Full Cycle Records.

Aided by Chris Lewis, Roni Size founded the record label WTP ("Where's The Party At?") as part of Circus Warp. With Dave Cridge who also DJed for Circus Warp and ran Replay Records Bristol, the two would visit The Record Basement in Reading and in 1993, Full Cycle and Dope Dragon were established. RCA Records employee Bryan Gee was an early admirer. In 1994, when Gee founded V Recordings, the first releases were Krust's Deceivers EP as catalogue number V001 and Agility, the debut release of Roni Size and DJ Die, as V002.

=== Collaborations and solo 1997–2007 ===
In April 1997, Roni Size & Reprazent had their live debut at Tribal Gathering. Williams created the group to perform live tracks he had been working on in the studio. The group included Full Cycle members Williams (Roni Size), Krust and Die, operating 'banks of equipment'; as well as Dynamite MC (vocals), Onallee (vocals), Si John (bass), and Clive Deamer (drums) taking centre stage.

The group's debut studio album, New Forms, was released on 23 June 1997, with singles featuring the vocals of Onallee including "Brown Paper Bag", "Heroes", "Share the Fall" and "Watching Windows". The album went five times platinum, won the Mercury Prize, and Williams returned to the studio to concentrate on his output for V and Full Cycle and Dope Dragon.

Following their mainstream breakthrough, Reprazent had a series of festival appearances in the summer of 1997. Their New Forms LP won the Mercury Music Prize. The singles from the album all featured singer Onallee, whose call for the music in "Brown Paper Bag" is a signal ravers still respond to. The album went platinum, and Roni Size and his collaborators returned to the studio.

Williams subsequently teamed up with DJ Die and Leonie Laws in Breakbeat Era, before returning to Reprazent to record the second album, October 2000's In the Mode, which included guest vocals from Zack de la Rocha of Rage Against the Machine and Method Man of Wu-Tang Clan. In 2001, he returned to the studio and started working with Tali, who had recently arrived from New Zealand on her album Lyric on My Lip. In this time, he also produced Touching Down – released in October 2002. This, his first truly solo album, included 16 tracks segued into one hour's set. He remixed the Zero 7 song "End Theme" the next year. He came back to V Recordings in 2005 with the release of Return To V, which included vocal collaborations with artists such as Beverley Knight, Jocelyn Brown, Vikter Duplaix, and Rodney P.

=== 2008–present ===
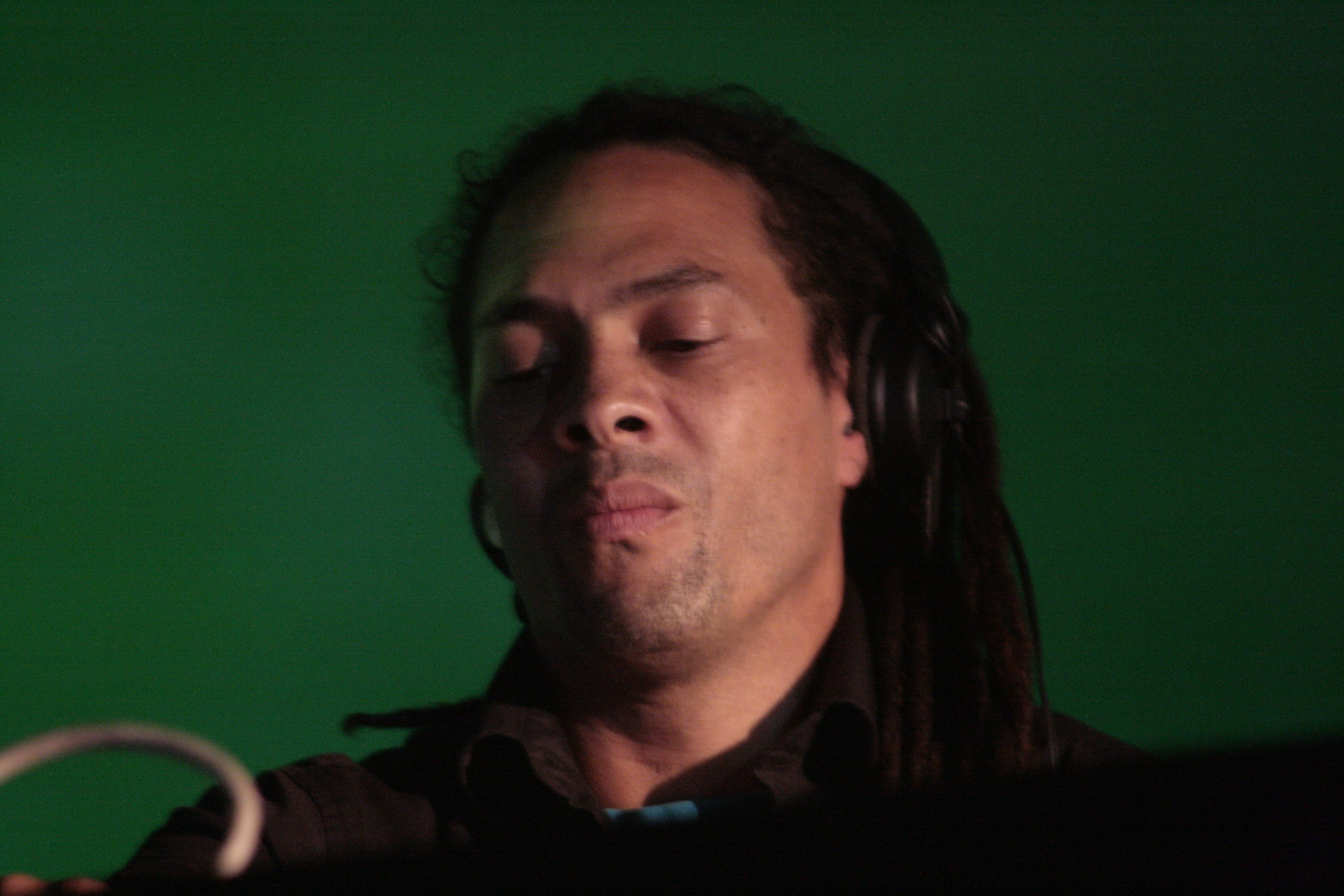
Roni Size in 2009

Williams resurrected Reprazent in 2008 with the release of a deluxe edition of New Forms on Universal. The reformed band included original members Dynamite MC, Onallee and bass player Si John alongside Yuval Gabay (Soul Coughing), D Product, Jay Wilcox and Pete Josef. Roni Size and Reprazent toured in some of the biggest festivals in Europe, including Bestival, Glastonbury, Lovebox, EXIT and Rock Herk. As a result, they were among the nominees for Best Dance Act from the UK Festival Awards.

The band started 2009 with a tour of Australia as part of the Good Vibrations Festival. Following on from this, Roni Size and Reprazent returned to North America for the first time in seven years as one of the headliners at the 2009 Ultra Music Festival in Miami. They then went on to perform at Coachella, appearing as the final act of the festival.

In September 2009, Roni Size and Reprazent played a gig with an orchestra and choir to mark the re-opening of Bristol's Colston Hall, collaborating with the BBC's Nature's Great Events composer, William Goodchild. In addition to older material, the band played material from a forthcoming Reprazent album.

== Musical style ==
Much acclaim has centred on Williams's melding of the propulsive jungle beats accompanied by live drums and double bass. The group Roni Size & Reprazent's drum and bass is equally blended from hip hop, funk, soul and house.

== Personal life ==
Williams is an avid Bristol Rovers fan and turned out for them in the charity match vs rivals Bristol City on May Bank Holiday Monday, 2013.

== Discography ==
=== Studio albums ===
- Touching Down (2002)
- Return to V (2004)
- Take Kontrol (2014)

=== Collaborative albums ===
- New Forms (1997) with Roni Size & Reprazent
- Ultra-Obscene (1999) with Breakbeat Era
- In the Møde (2000) with Roni Size & Reprazent
- New Forms² (2008) with Roni Size & Reprazent
- Past & Present (2016) with Krust

=== Singles and EPs ===
- "Witchcraft" (1994) featuring Krust
- "Fashion" (1995)
- "Square Off" (1996)
- "Snapshot" (1999)
- "26 Bass" (1999)
- "Sound Advice" (2002)
- "Playtime" (2002)
- "Freshen up the Budgie" (2003)
- "Snapshot 3" (2003)
- "Out of Breath" (2004)
- "No More" (featuring Beverley Knight & Dynamite MC) (2005)
- "Touching Down, Vol. 2" (2005)
- "Friends" (2006)
- "Kops & Robbers" (2009)
- "Out of Order" (2010)
- "Size Matters" (2014)
- ”Edition 1 (Vintage)” (2021)

=== Compilations and DJ mixes ===
- Music Box (1993)
- Through the Eyes (2000)
