= Onallee =

British vocalist and songwriter

- Occupations: Vocalist, songwriter
- Label: Onallee Records

Onallee (also known as Tracey Bowen) is a British vocalist and songwriter best known for being part of Reprazent, a British drum and bass act formed by Roni Size.

In 2016, she produced an audio visual performance called Futurism 3.0 with D Product.

== Media ==
Appearances:

- Better Living Through Circuitry (1999) - documentary about the United States rave scene
