= True Spirit (Carleen Anderson album) =

1994 studio album by Carleen Anderson

Studio album by Carleen Anderson
- Released: June 6, 1994
- Genre: R&B; soul
- Label: Circa; Virgin
- Producer: Ian Green; Brendan Lynch

Carleen Anderson chronology
True Spirit (1994)	Blessed Burden (1998)

Singles from True Spirit
- 1. "Nervous Breakdown" Released: January 31, 1994; 2. "Mama Said" Released: May 16, 1994; 3. "True Spirit" Released: August 1, 1994; 4. "Let It Last" Released: January 1995

True Spirit is the debut solo album by American singer and musician Carleen Anderson, released in 1994. The album includes four UK Top 40 singles: "Nervous Breakdown" (No. 27), "Mama Said" (No. 26), "True Spirit" (No. 24) and "Let It Last" (No. 16).

== Critical reception ==
Professional ratings
Review scores
Source	Rating
AllMusic	3/5 stars
Select	4/5 medals

The Guardian noted that "big ballads like 'Only One for Me' and 'Secrets', all strings and heavy breathing, are so pompous that even this fine singer can only coast along."

In a retrospective review for AllMusic, Tom Demalon describes Anderson's voice as "warm" and "soulful" and that the album "succeeds in drawing on older R&B vibes and making them sound fresh." He went on to say that the lyrics are "literate and sophisticated", adding that "True Spirit is a gorgeous album that constantly draws in the listener, both musically and spiritually."

== Track listing ==
All tracks written by Carleen Anderson, except where noted.

No.	Title	Writer(s)	Length
1.	"True Spirit"		4:40
2.	"Morning Love"		5:36
3.	"Mama Said"	Anderson; Ian Green	4:07
4.	"Ain't Givin' up on You"	Anderson; Green	4:24
5.	"Only One for Me"		4:36
6.	"Nervous Breakdown"		7:34
7.	"Secrets"		4:35
8.	"Let It Last"	Anderson; Mark E. Nevin	4:54
9.	"Feet Wet Up"		4:34
10.	"Welcome to Changes"		3:19
11.	"Ian Green's Groove Conclusion"	Green	1:37

== Personnel ==
- Carleen Anderson – arranger, primary artist, vocals
- Amanda Drummond – strings
- Ian Green – arranger, instrumentation, mixing, producer
- Martin "Max" Heyes – mixing
- Nigel Hitchcock – alto and tenor sax
- Stephen Hussey – strings
- Norman Jay – handclapping
- Brendan Lynch – glockenspiel, handclapping, producer, synthesizer
- Marco Nelson – bass
- Mark E. Nevin – arranger, guitar, handclapping, mellotron
- Jake Rea – strings
- Timothy Russell – engineer
- Steve Sidwell – trumpet
- Michael Talbot – keyboards
- Crispin Taylor – drums

== Charts ==
Chart (1994)	Peak position
UK Albums Chart	12

== Certifications ==
Region	Certification	Certified units/sales
United Kingdom (BPI)	Silver	60,000^{^}
^{^} Shipments figures based on certification alone.
