= Galliano (band) =

British acid jazz group

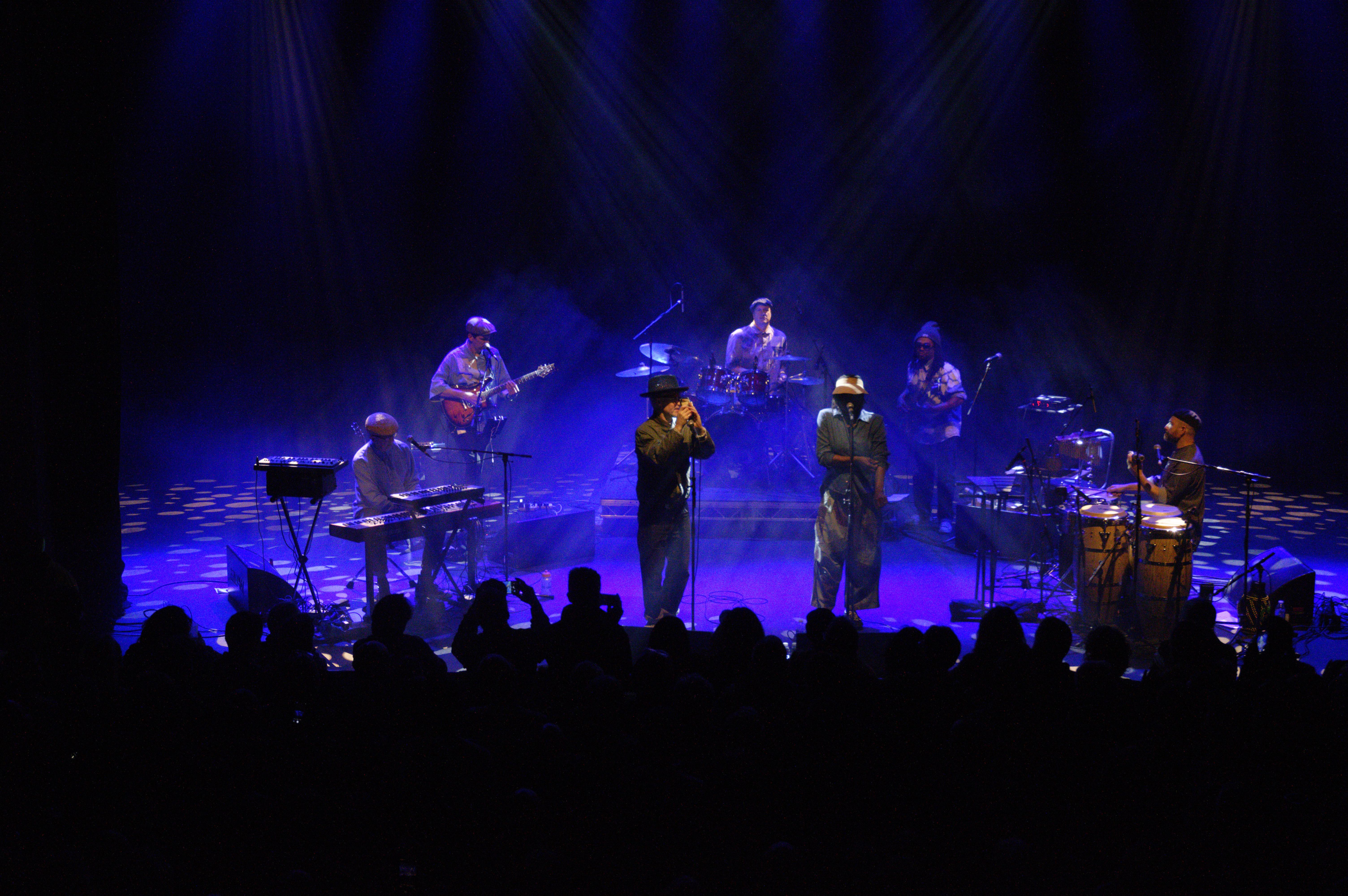
Galliano live at Shepherd's Bush Empire in 2025.

Galliano are a London-based acid jazz group that were originally active between 1988 and 1997. Galliano was the first to record on Eddie Piller and Gilles Peterson's Acid Jazz record label, then the first signing to Peterson's newly formed Talkin' Loud label. Original member Robert Gallagher (vocals – credited as Roberto Galliano) was joined by Constantine Weir (vocals), and Crispin Robinson (percussion) that would perform Last Poets-influenced spoken-word pieces. Michael Snaith (The Vibe Controller) joined as the trio became a band in order to tour their first album on Talkin' Loud, In Pursuit of the 13th Note. The album featured Roy Ayers, and was awarded an Edison Populair writing award in 1992.

After an early tour of Japan, a core band emerged consisting of Valerie Etienne, who participated in the recording of all their forthcoming albums, along with Mick Talbot on keyboards, Crispin Taylor on drums, Ernie McKone on bass guitar, Mark Vandergucht on guitar, and Steve Ameedee, otherwise known as Uncle Big Man (dancer).

Ski Oakenfull, originally of the K Creative, also on Talkin' Loud, replaced Mick Talbot on keyboards in 1994. The band split in November 1997 after a farewell gig at Camden's Dingwalls club. The band announced a return in 2023, and have completed a UK tour culminating in a sellout show at Shepherd's Bush Empire in November 2024.

== Career ==
The group's first single, a reworking of Curtis Mayfield's "Freddie's Dead" called "Frederick Lies Still", was released in June 1988. It was also the first release on the Acid Jazz label. Their second release was "Let the Good Times Roll" (credited to "The Quiet Boys ft. Galliano") in 1989. "The Quiet Boys" was an alias used by acid jazz pioneer Chris Bangs, who went on to produce Galliano.

Galliano's first album release was In Pursuit of the 13th Note in 1991, which was produced by Bangs. Their second album A Joyful Noise Unto the Creator, was released in 1992.

Galliano achieved the peak of their success in 1994 with The Plot Thickens which peaked at number eight in the UK Albums Chart. Two UK top 40 singles were released from the album, "Long Time Gone" (a cover of a David Crosby song from the self-titled first album by Crosby, Stills & Nash) and "Twyford Down". The latter was a comment on the road building protests taking place at the time and the protest at Twyford Down in particular, and they were joined onstage by anti-roads protestors to make appeals to the audience. The album was well received, making the NME's list of top 50 albums of the year. Following its release, Galliano performed on the Pyramid Stage at the Glastonbury Festival in 1994 and returned to play the NME Stage in 1995.

Galliano's fourth studio album, :4, was released in 1996. This included the track "Slack Hands", which was used in the title sequence of Kevin Reynolds' 1997 film One Eight Seven, starring Samuel L. Jackson.

Galliano broke up in 1997. Gallagher together with Etienne formed Two Banks of Four; Gallagher also performs solo using the names Earl Zinger, William Anderson and together with Alex Patchwork as The Diabolical Liberties.

In early 2023, Galliano announced a return, including a new album and a few live gigs that year. The band played twice at Gilles Peterson's We Out Here festival in August 2023, playing covers of "Harvest for the World" and "Uptown Top Ranking" alongside their original material.

In May 2024, they released their first single in 28 years, "Circles Going Round The Sun"; in June 2024, they released "Pleasure, Joy & Happiness", a cover of a song by Eddie Chacon. Their fifth album, Halfway Somewhere, their first in 28 years, was released on 30 August 2024. The album was co-produced by Rob Gallagher (lead vocals) and Ski Oakenfull (keyboards), and featured many of the original musicians including Valerie Etienne (lead vocals), Ernie McKone (bass guitar), Crispin Taylor (drums), Crispin Robinson (percussion), and Booie Gallagher (percussion).

== Discography ==
=== Studio albums ===
List of albums, with selected chart positions
| Title | Album details | Peak chart positions | |
| Title | Album details | UK | AUS |
|---|---|---|---|
| In Pursuit of the 13th Note | Released: 1991; Label: Talkin' Loud | – | 177 |
| A Joyful Noise Unto The Creator | Released: 1992; Label: Talkin' Loud | 28 | 152 |
| The Plot Thickens | Released: 1994; Label: Talkin' Loud | 8 | 103 |
| :4 | Released: 1996; Label: Talkin' Loud | – | – |
| Halfway Somewhere | Released: August 30, 2024; Label: Brownswood | – | – |

=== Live albums ===
- Until Such Time (Recorded Live In Europe '92) – 1993 – Talkin' Loud
- Live at Liquid Room (Tokyo) – 1997 – Talkin' Loud

=== Compilation albums ===
- What Colour Our Flag – 1994 – Talkin' Loud
- Thicker Plot (Remixes 93–94) – 1994 – Talkin' Loud

=== Singles ===
| Year | Single | Peak positions | | | Album |
| Year | Single | UK | AUS | NED | Album |
|---|---|---|---|---|---|
| 1988 | "Frederic Lies Still" | — | — | — | Singles only |
| 1989 | "Let the Good Times Roll" (The Quiet Boys feat. Galliano) | — | — | — | Singles only |
| 1990 | "Welcome to the Story" | — | — | — | In Pursuit of the 13th Note |
| 1991 | "Nothing Has Changed" | 88 | — | 78 | In Pursuit of the 13th Note |
| 1991 | "Power and Glory" | — | — | — | In Pursuit of the 13th Note |
| 1991 | "Jus' Reach" | — | — | — | A Joyful Noise Unto the Creator |
| 1992 | "Skunk Funk" | 41 | — | — | A Joyful Noise Unto the Creator |
| 1992 | "Prince of Peace" | 47 | — | 74 | A Joyful Noise Unto the Creator |
| 1992 | "Jus' Reach Recycled" | 66 | — | — | A Joyful Noise Unto the Creator |
| 1994 | "Long Time Gone" | 15 | 126 | — | The Plot Thickens |
| 1994 | "Twyford Down" | 37 | — | — | The Plot Thickens |
| 1996 | "Ease Your Mind" | 45 | — | — | :4 |
| 1996 | "Roofing Tiles" | 81 | — | — | :4 |
| 2024 | "Circles Going Round The Sun" | — | — | — | Halfway Somewhere |
| 2024 | "Pleasure, Joy & Happiness" | — | — | — | Halfway Somewhere |
"—" denotes "did not chart or was not released".
