= Krust =

English drum and bass producer and DJ

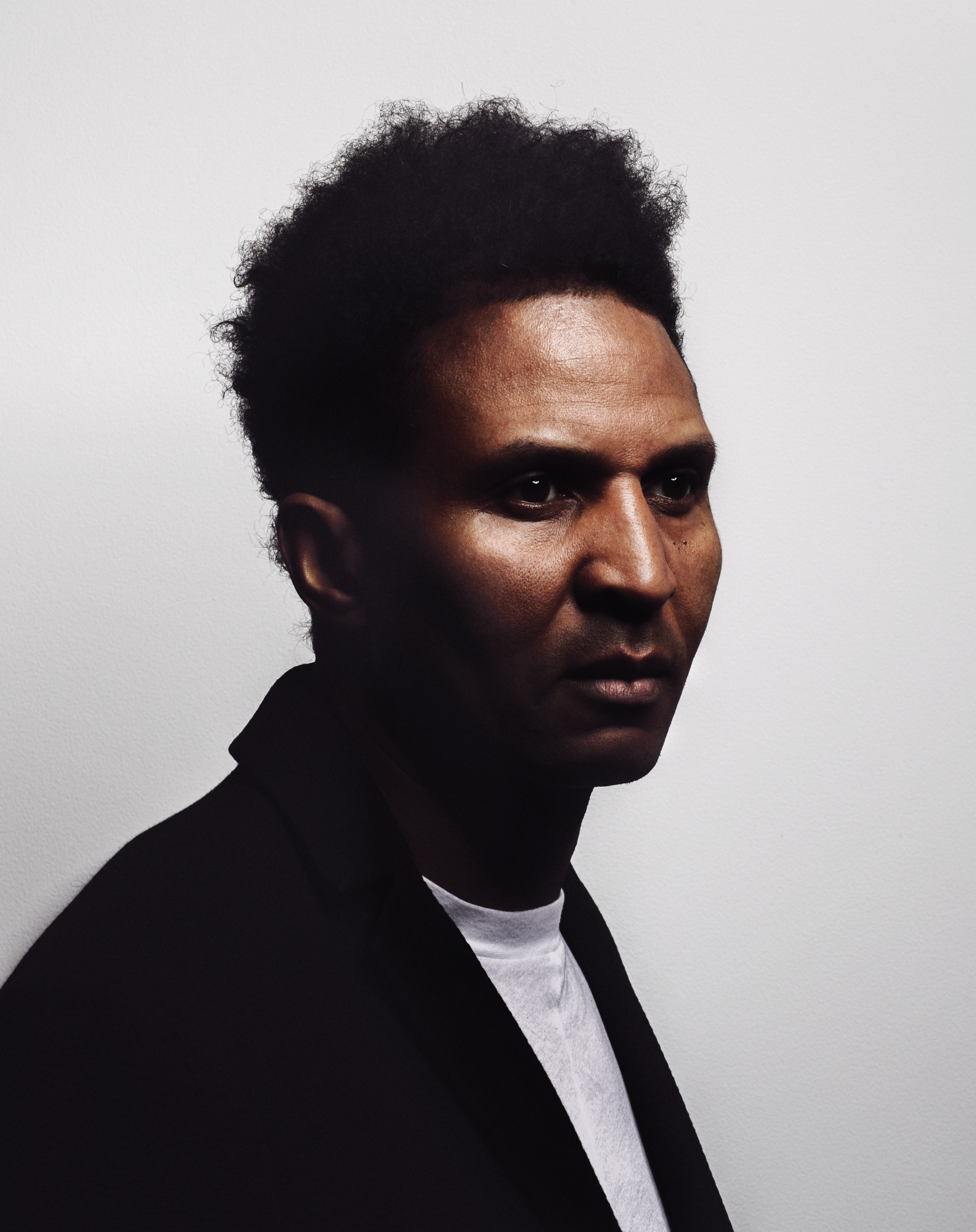
- Krust in 2018

Background information
- Also known as: DJ Krust, George Kurts, Gang Related, Glamour Gold
- Born: Kirk Thompson; 26 July 1968 (age 57); Bristol, England
- Genres: Drum and bass, jungle, hip hop
- Occupations: Producer, DJ, creative consultant, CBD oil company owner
- Years active: 1989–present
- Labels: Full Cycle; Talkin' Loud; V Recordings; Dope Dragon; Philly Blunt; Rebel Instinct

Kirk Thompson (born 26 July 1968), better known by his stage name Krust, is an English drum and bass producer, DJ and co-owner of the Full Cycle record label. Beyond his roles in the music industry, Thompson is also responsible for two businesses: creative consultancy Disruptive Patterns and Amma Life, a CBD oil company he co-owns with Sophia Ali.

He is regarded as one of drum & bass and jungle's founders and pioneers and noted for his unique musical style. Krust has released over 100 tracks and three albums on labels such as Full Cycle, Talkin' Loud and V Recordings. He was a member of Mercury Music Award-winning collective Reprazent and his most prominent releases such as "Warhead" and "Soul in Motion" are cited by peers and press as some of the most highly influential within the genre.

Thompson has been active as a recording artist since his debut single with UK top 10 charting Bristol collective Fresh 4 in 1989. His release rate did, however, slow down between 2008 and 2017 as he studied and established himself in other fields such as Neuro-Linguistic Programming and life coaching. While never quitting music entirely, he became increasingly more active in drum & bass with the re-launch of Full Cycle in 2016. and made a return as a recording artist in 2017 with an Om Unit collaboration called "Underground Cinema".

His first new album in 14 years entitled Edge of Everything was released in November 2020 with lead single "Constructive Ambiguity" picking up single of the month in DJ Magazine.

== Early life ==
Born 26 July 1968 in Bristol England, Krust grew up in Bristol's Knowle West council estate where he embraced the city's burgeoning b-boy culture and learnt to breakdance. Inspired by hip hop film Wild Style, he set up his first crew Fresh 4 in school who would perform, host competitions and discos at local youth clubs across Bristol. Key members of the collective alongside Krust were his brother J Flynn and friend Paul Southey (Suv) After leaving school, Fresh 4 established themselves in a squat in Bedminster where they would regularly hold parties.

== Career ==
=== Early career ===
Inspired by Bristol's Wild Bunch collective (which comprised members of Massive Attack) Krust's brother Flynn approached Bristol roots reggae and sound system dub music influenced producer Rob Smith with an idea for song which later became "Wishing on a Star"; a cover of the song by Billie Calvin, that sampled Faze O's "Riding High" and James Brown's "Funky Drummer" break. The song featured Lizz E on vocals and charted at number 10 in the UK official charts on 7 October 1989. It was the highest-charting release to come from the musical movement often referred to as the Bristol scene until Portishead charted at number eight with "All Mine" in 1997.

Fresh 4 released a follow-up single "Release Yourself" in July 1990. It charted at 81. The band signed an album deal with Virgin Records and worked regularly in London for two years to work on an album but left the label due to artistic differences. The album was eventually released in 2015 as The Lost Tapes on Bristol Archive Records.

In 1992 Fresh 4 disbanded as a group and returned to Bristol. Krust continued to work on music while attending raves in the UK southwest region. He released two studio productions during this time with Flynn and Suv under the name Hocus Pocus. These early hardcore tracks were released on Twisted Records, a label financed by roots reggae and dub music influenced Smith & Mighty. During this time Krust also ran a citywide bicycle courier company called Catch 22 and, alongside Suv and DJ Die, would also host events in the Bedminster area of Bristol in the same squat that the video for Fresh 4's "Wishing on a Star" was filmed in. These squat raves would often hire the Diditek soundsystem run by Carl Williams whose brother, Roni Size, was the engineer.

=== 1993–1997: Full Cycle, V Recordings, Dope Dragon, Philly Blunt ===
Thompson released his first drum & bass productions under his Krust alias in 1993. "The Resister" was released on Full Circle Records, a label set up by Krust and Size that changed its name to Full Cycle after its first release. This marked the most prolific chapter of Thompson's career as a recording artist during which he released a large body of work under a variety of aliases such as Krust, Deceivers, Glamour Gold and Gang Related. He also released numerous collaborations with fellow Full Cycle artists Roni Size, Die and Suv under aliases such as Wings, 3 Way and, later, Kamanchi.

As well as establishing Full Cycle, Krust and Size also launched Dope Dragon, a label established as an experimental outlet for the Bristol collective to have fun and release under different aliases. Between these two labels Krust displayed a wide sonic repertoire that ranged from deeper, jazzy tracks such as "Touch" and "Future Talk" to heavier, dub and jungle-oriented club tracks such as "Oh My Gosh" and "Rukus".

Amid these releases were also many appearances on V Recordings, the label run by Jumping Jack Frost and Bryan Gee; the DJ credited for signing Krust and his peers and championing what is often referred to in drum & bass as "the Bristol Sound". V Recordings launched with the Fatal Dose EP by Krust under the alias The Deceivers and consequently released frequent Krust productions. He also appeared many times on its subsidiary, more jungle-defined label Philly Blunt and wrote a considerable number of remixes as the decade developed ranging from Shy FX ("Funkindemup", 1996) Björk ("So Broken", 1998) to Korn ("Falling Away from Me", 1999).

Krust's output was described by author Peter Shapiro in his book Drum 'n' Bass The Rough Guide as "becoming more progressively apocalyptic as the 1990s developed". Often, but not always, characterised by orchestral elements, cinematic soundscapes and long drawn-out bass textures, some of the most documented, influential and popularly played Krust productions were released during this time. These include "Warhead", "Angles", "True Stories" and "Soul in Motion" which has made such an impression on the genre, Need For Mirrors and Bailey named their fortnightly London event after it.

During this period Krust releases were notoriously circulated as dubplates upwards of years before their release and many were twice the length of typical five- to seven-minute drum & bass tracks. Tracks such as "Brief Encounter" and "Ideal World" on his 1996 EP Genetic Manipulation were 13 minutes and 10 minutes respectively, as was "True Stories" which was released in 1998 on Talkin' Loud.

=== 1997–2001: Talkin Loud, Def Jam Records ===
Thompson's solo productions began to slow down during the late 90s as he became a recording and touring member of Roni Size's Reprazent collective. Signed to Gilles Peterson's Talkin' Loud imprint, the band's debut album New Forms won the UK Mercury Music Prize in 1997 and charted in the UK Official Charts Top 40 six times between 1997 – 2001 with singles such as "Share the Fall", "Heroes", "Brown Paper Bag" and "Dirty Beats". The band were signed to Mercury in the UK and Def Jam in the US and released a second album In the Mode in 2000.

Talkin' Loud was also responsible for many Krust productions during this time including "True Stories", "Future Unknown" and his debut solo album Coded Language in 1999. Rapper and slam poet Saul Williams featured on the title track and the album also included beatless string pieces such as "One Moment" and the vocals of singer Morgan on the track "Re Arrange". It was met with favourable reviews. Coded Language was followed by a remix album Decoded in 2000 which featured remixes by Krust himself, DJ Die and previously unreleased track "Witchcraft". Krust also appeared on Talkin' Loud's soundtrack to UK horror movie Long Time Dead with a cover of David Bowie and Giorgio Moroder's "Cat People".

=== 2000–08: Full Cycle, Kamanchi, Hidden Knowledge ===
Thompson continued to release music on Full Cycle and V during his time on Talkin' Loud and Def Jam (who released Talkin' Loud in North America). Prominent releases during the early 2000s were new versions of "Warhead"; the Steppa Pt 2 remix and "Warhead 2000" (released on Planet V – The Remixes), a remix of Roni Size's "Snapshot" and the angular, paranoid "Kloakin' Device" which led to a follow-up "Kloakin King" and its b-side "Don't Front" in 2002.

In contrast to the "Kloakin" series, Thompson and DJ Die continued to work together on their funkier, more soulful Kamanchi project. Following the release of "Stay" in 1999 on V Recordings' Planet V and numerous dubplates such as "Warrior Ship" and "Right Now Doing Our Thing", Kamanchi released their only album I Kamanchi in 2003. The album featured live instrumentation and had a heavy vocal presence from singers Tali, Leanne and Keirin Kirby (under the name Violet) and rappers Rodney P, Darrison and Retna. It was described by Dutch dance website Party Scene as one "that underlines that the future of drum 'n' bass lies in the vocals and warmth and not so much in sinister baldness" while US site XLR8R wrote how the album "valiantly finds a balance between the crossover cut and the dancefloor filler."

Following Kamanchi, Krust and Die collaborated under their solo names with Collision Course in 2004. Other collaborations during this time included one with DJ Zinc on Bingo Beats ("Again" / "New Territory", 2005) and Clipz ("Brainwash" and "Robots Rebellion", 2005) while solo singles such as "Follow Da Vision / Paper Monster" and "Malice / Manipulation" led towards his second solo album Hidden Knowledge.

Released in 2006, the album was described by UK music site The Skinny as capturing "every element that Krust has explored throughout his illustrious production career." Krust has stated in interviews how the album was written during a time of studying philosophy and religion and how tracks such as "Belief System", "Choose Consciousness" and "Human Awareness" were titled to encourage researching their topics.

It included a bonus CD with a selection of some of Krust's previous successful tracks such as "Guess", "Soul in Motion", "Jazz Note" and "Last Day". Singles that came off the album included the Hidden Knowledge EP, which featured a DJ Zinc remix of past hit "Follow Da Vision" and an instrumental version of "New Humans" and a 12 inch of "Belief System" / "Mystery School". These were Krust's last official single releases of the 2000s. His last release during this era was a retrospective Full Cycle double mix CD Journey thru the Cycle in 2007. Full Cycle ceased business in 2008. Both Krust and Roni have stated in interviews how the label had run its course for that period and how they needed to take time away from music to focus on their families and future.

=== 2008–present: Disruptive Patterns, Amma Life and return to music ===
Thompson moved to London in 2006 and took time out of the music industry in 2008 for a number of years as he "needed to develop in different ways". He studied neurolinguistic programming and his first non-music business venture was Disruptive Patterns, a lifestyle coaching consultancy launched in 2009 and aimed at translating the ideologies of jungle into other industry sectors. Disruptive Patterns workshops and seminars involve advice on time management, overcoming personal challenges, creative thinking, wellness and the development of the working mindset and have been held across music colleges and universities across the UK and venues such as The Barbican and Soho House. They also spawned a run of seminars aimed specifically at new producers called Future Minds.

Coaching and advice has remained a main drive for Thompson and is evident in various online activities with Disruptive Patterns podcasts, his blog, and his active interactions on crowd sourced question and answer site Quora. He regularly discusses the idea of breaking the rules, unlearning what you know and experimenting with new ideas.

In 2014 Thompson also launched Amma Life, a CBD oil company with business partner Sophia Ali who met Kirk through her work as a therapist at Bristol's Relaxation Centre. Their company creates a wide range of CBD products. The Amma Life website describes their business ethic as wanting to "support people to live creative, happy, healthy lives and to tap into their unrealised potential to live life to the fullest."

In 2010 Thompson began to gradually make his return to electronic music and bass culture with his band The Rules with fellow Bristol artist Nick Toots. They released "Sign Up" in 2010 with a remix by drum & bass artist Zen It was released on Krust's new imprint Rebel Instinct, a label established as "a breeding ground for revolution" and was followed by a selection of digital releases including a various artists EP entitled Transparency featuring Need For Mirrors and new material from Thompson under both his Krust and Gang Related aliases and an EP by Benjamin One. Rebel Instinct also introduced George Kurts, a new experimental, non-drum & bass alias from Thompson that has so far released and uploaded a small selection of tracks: "Monitor Your Thoughts" (2012), "Big Foot" (2015) and "Mad Paradise" (2015).

In 2014 Krust remixed Claude VonStroke's "Oakland Rope". It was released on the remix edition of Urban Animal. VonStroke had previously stated on his social media that the track was a homage to Krust and the Bristol sound.

In 2016 Krust's return to drum & bass developed with the re-launch of Full Cycle with Roni Size. The announcement followed Krust and Roni Size's first DJ gig together in many years at the BBC's 6 Music Festival 2016 in Bristol's Colston Hall. Full Cycle launched in March 2016 with "Formulate", a 1996 collaboration with Size that was previously only released on an American label Breakbeat Science and a remix of Krust's "Kloaking Device" by UK artist Fracture. Krust has stated that Full Cycle still celebrates originality and excitement and how the label is working with artists who "share the same vision as us and can expand the next chapter of Full Cycle." Artists to appear on the label since its relaunch include Total Recall, Need For Mirrors and D Product.

2016 also saw Thompson collaborate with London artist Om Unit as he featured on "Underground Cinema", an 8-minute track FACT Magazine described as a "future classic". It was followed in 2017 by the release of two previously unreleased dubplates from the mid 1990s on Dom & Roland's Dubs from the Dungeons series: "Ivory Puzzle" and "Flip It".

Thompson then released his first full single release in over 10 years, since the closure of Full Cycle, in January 2018. "The Portal" and "Concealing Treachery" were released on Doc Scott's 31 Records. Scott stated on Twitter about the release: "There have been many moments as a label owner that I can look back on that make me very proud. But this might be my proudest moment of all." Resident Advisor's reviewer Mark Smith also commented that if Krust "can maintain this standard, it'll be one of the strongest comebacks in drum & bass history."

== Discography ==
Studio albums

- Coded Language (1999)
- I Kamanchi (2003) with DJ Die
- Hidden Knowledge (2006)
- The Edge of Everything (2020)

Compilation albums

- Through the Eyes (2000)
- Journey Thru the Cycle (2008)
- Irrational Numbers (Volumes I-V) (2023/24)

EPs

- Genetic Manipulation (1997)
- Decoded (2000)
- Hidden Knowledge (2006)

Singles

- "The Resister" (1993)
- "Jazz Note" b/w "Burning" (1994)
- "Touch" (1995)
- "Poison" b/w "Set Speed" (1995)
- "Guess" b/w "Maintain" (1995)
- "Future Talk" b/w "Quiz Show" (1995)
- "Priorities" b/w "Memories" (1996)
- "Angles" b/w "Not Necessarily a Man" (1996)
- "Jazz Note II" b/w "B-Boy Culture" (1997)
- "Warhead (Steppa Mix)" b/w "Check Dis Out" (1997)
- "Future Unknown" (1997)
- "Soul in Motion" b/w "Going Nowhere" (1997)
- "True Stories" b/w "Cold War" (1998)
- "Coded Language" (featuring Saul Williams) b/w "Excuses" (1999)
- "One Moment" b/w "Overture" (1999)
- "Tribute" b/w "Second Movement" (1999)
- "Kloakin Devices" b/w "Break Ya Neck" (2000)
- "Kloakin' King" b/w "Don't Front" (2002)
- "Follow da Vision" b/w "Paper Monster" (2004)
- "Malice" b/w "Manipulation" (2005)
- "Belief System" b/w "Mystery School" (2006)
- "The Portal" b/w "Concealing Treachery" (2018)
- "Unit 23" b/w "Pentacle" (2020)
- "The Fundamentalist" b/w "Another Story" (2020)
- "Constructive Ambiguity" b/w "Tree of Life" (2020)
- "The Master" b/w "Resistance" (2021)
