= DJ Die =

English DJ and music producer

- Birth name: Daniel Robert Kausman
- Born: 13 October 1972 (age 52); Barnstaple, Devon, England
- Occupations: DJ; producer
- Years active: 1988–present
- Labels: Full Cycle; V Recordings

Daniel Robert Kausman (born 13 October 1972), better known by his stage name DJ Die, is an English DJ and music producer. He was a founder of drum and bass label Full Cycle Recordings and a member of Roni Size & Reprazent (1997 Mercury Prize winners) and Breakbeat Era.

Kausman spent his formative years in Barnstaple before moving to Bristol in 1985 as a teenager. An early interest in house and hardcore led to a musical partnership with friend Jody Wisternoff (who later formed Way Out West with Nick Warren). Die DJ'd for a brief period with Circus Warp – a free party sound system. Recording together under the aliases of Tru Funk and Sub Love on Three Stripe Records, they created hardcore staples like "4am" and made numerous DJing appearances at early Universe raves. The partnership, however, was a brief one.

After a chance meeting with Roni Size at Bristol's Replay Records store in 1992, this led to their first collaboration in the form of Agility for V Recordings and Die's ongoing contributions to the Full Cycle Recordings catalogue.

Together with Size, he originated the seminal "Music Box" which was to become the title track of the debut Full Cycle compilation in 1996. Emerging firstly as a core member of Reprazent and later in 1998 as one third of Breakbeat Era (a project spawned by the "Music Box" track of the same name), he soon found himself remixing for DJs including DJ Shadow, Towa Tei and DJ Cam. His remix of the Reprazent single "Watching Windows" was released in its own right by Talkin' Loud. He has his own label called Clear Skyz.

DJ Die has also recorded under the aliases Break & Die (DJ Die and DJ Break), Die & Clipz (DJ Die and DJ Clipz), Swabe, 4 Tree, Breakbeat Era (with Leonie Laws and Roni Size), DNA (with Bill Riley), Scorpio (with Roni), Wings (with Roni and Krust), Kamanchi (with Krust) and DieMantle (with Dismantle).
