= Dynamite MC =

English rapper and MC

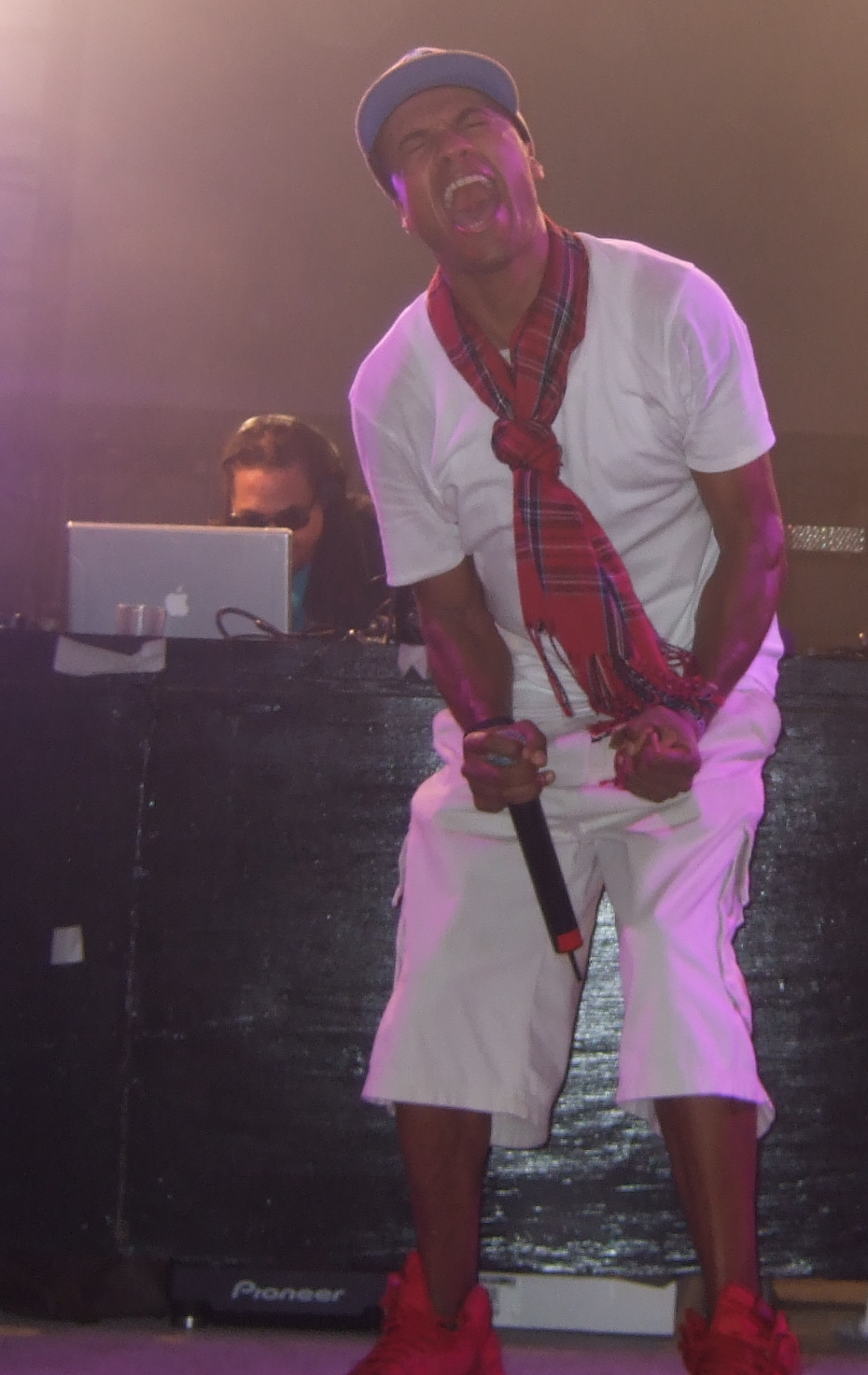
- Dynamite MC performing at Ultra Music Festival 2009

Background information
- Born: Dominic Joseph Smith; 7 October 1973 (age 52)
- Origin: United Kingdom
- Genres: Hip-hop; drum and bass
- Occupations: Rapper; MC
- Labels: Strong; Dynavibez; M.I.Q; Hospital; Full Cycle

Dynamite MC (born Dominic Smith, 7 October 1973) is an English rapper and MC. He originally gained prominence in jungle/drum and bass, working with Roni Size & Reprazent, but has also released hip-hop material.

== Career ==
He started his MCing career on pirate radio station Crush FM, broadcasting in Gloucester, South West England during the early 1990s. He met Roni Size in 1994 and began MCing for the Full Cycle crew. When the Bristol collective formed the live band Reprazent, Dynamite shared vocal duties with singer, Onallee. Their debut album New Forms won the Mercury Music Prize in 1997. Dynamite's role was enhanced for Reprazent's second album, the hip-hop influenced In the Mode (2000).

=== Solo work ===
Following this, Dynamite collaborated with a range of artists including The Nextmen, High Contrast, Caspa, Netsky, DJ Skitz, Scratch Perverts, Andy C and DJ Zinc, releasing a solo album The World of Dynamite (2004). In 2006, a remix CD, Big Man Talk was released on the Strong Records label (featuring samples from Enya and Kanye West).

=== Other works ===
Dynamite MC used to host a two-hour 'Smooth Grooves' show on Kiss 100 every Monday night at 9:00pm (GMT), as well as hosting the Fresh 40 R&B and dance chart across some of the UK's commercial radio stations on Sunday afternoons. Also was a Kool Fm DJ/Host whilst in the UK.

The track "Bounce" is featured on the soundtrack of Madden NFL '07. "Bounce" and "After Party" also feature in the video game, Need for Speed: Carbon. He recently worked with Camo & Krooked for their song "Stand Up" (Camo & Krooked vs Friction feat. Dynamite MC), with Netsky on a track titled "The Whistle Song" for Netsky's album, 2, and with Dyro on "Against All Odds". Dynamite MC also joined Chris Goss as the co-host of Hospital Records in Forza Horizon 6.

== Discography ==
=== Albums ===
- The World of Dynamite (2004)
- The World of Dynamite Deluxe (2015)
- Big Man Talk Mixtape (2006)
- Big Man Talk 2 (2009)
- Big Man Talk 3 (2011)
- All 4 Corners (with Krafty Kuts) 2017
- Playing the Dark (with DRS) 2020
- Deep Waters (2022)

=== Singles ===
- "Switch" (1994)
- "After Party" (1998)
- "Hey DJ" (Kamanchi feat. Dynamite MC) (2002) – UK No. 85
- "Hotness" (2003) – UK No. 66
- "Ride" (2004) – UK No. 54
- "No More" – UK No. 26
- "Bounce"
- "What!" (2008)
- "Here We Go" (DJ Fumiya feat. Dynamite MC) (2010)
- "Kawaii" (feat. Missill, Aluna Francis and Rye Rye) (2011)
- "Prototype" (2018)
- Dealing with the Best (2025)
- Thread the Needle (2026)
- Hold my Pen (2026)
- Brilliant Mode (2026)
- Multiple Releases every year since 2000's - check Spotify
