= Talkin' Loud =

Record label started by Gilles Peterson at Phonogram in 1990

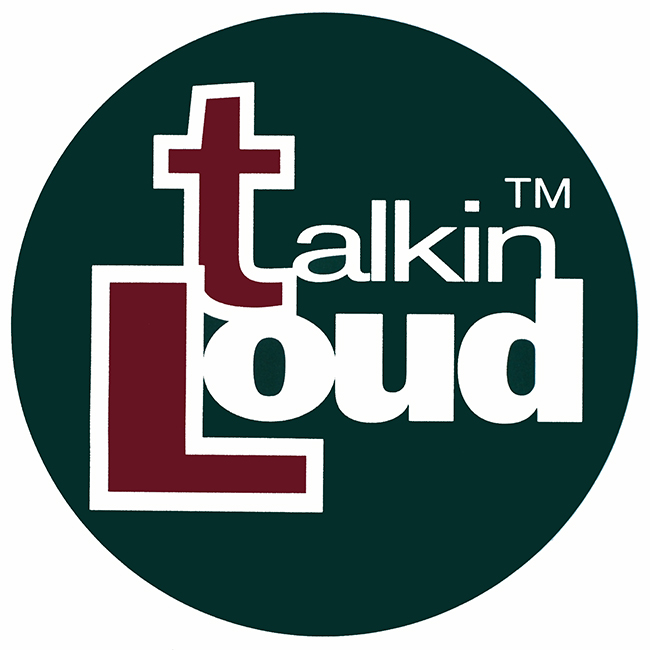
- Founded: 1990
- Founder: Gilles Peterson
- Genre: Acid jazz; nu jazz; drum and bass
- Country of origin: UK
- Location: London

Talkin' Loud was a record label, originally founded by Gilles Peterson in 1990 after he left Acid Jazz Records. The label name is based on Peterson's Dingwalls club night "Talkin' Loud And Sayin' Something", itself a reference to James Brown and Bobby Byrd's "Talkin' Loud and Sayin' Nothing". Norman Jay was its A&R. The label is owned by Phonogram.

The first release from Talkin' Loud was a self-titled compilation in 1990 featuring artists Galliano, Jalal of the Last Poets, Incognito, Young Disciples, Wild & Peaceful, and Ace of Clubs. The label saw five of its artists nominated for the Mercury Music Prize, with Roni Size's Reprazent winning the award in 1997 for the album New Forms. The Talkin' Loud logo was created by Ian Swift (Swifty), who also designed the magazine Straight No Chaser.

== Artists ==
- 4hero
- Abstract Truth
- Ace of Clubs
- Ahmen-Rah
- Bryan Powell
- The Cinematic Orchestra
- Cleveland Watkiss
- Courtney Pine
- DJ Krust
- Dwele
- Dynamite MC
- Elisabeth Troy
- Eternal Sun
- Femi Kuti
- Galliano
- Gilles Peterson
- Heliocentric World
- Incognito
- Innerzone Orchestra
- Jazzanova
- Jeffrey Darnell
- Johnny One-Drop
- K-Creative, The
- Krust
- Marxman
- MC Solaar
- MJ Cole
- Native Sol
- Neil Barnes
- Nicolette
- Nuyorican Soul
- Oliver Nelson
- Omar
- Perception
- Peter Thomas
- Raw Deal
- Roni Size / Reprazent
- The Roots
- Shawn Lee
- Skinnyman
- Sons of Samacand
- Steps Ahead
- Tamba Trio
- Tammy Payne
- Terry Callier
- Tim Dog
- United Future Organization
- Urban Species
- Wax Doctor
- Young Disciples

== See also ==
- Lists of record labels
