= List of independent UK record labels =

This is a list of notable independent record labels based in the United Kingdom.

== 0-9 ==
- 2Point9 Records
- 2 Tone Records
- 3 Beat Records
- 4AD
- 53rd & 3rd

== A ==
- Acid Jazz Records
- Adaadat
- Aesop (record label)
- Alcopop! Records
- All Saints Records
- Ambush Reality
- Angel Air Records
- Angular Recording Corporation
- Anhrefn Records
- Ankst
- Argo Records (until 1957; sold to Decca and then PolyGram, now under Universal Music Group (UMG))
- Armellodie Records
- Atlantic Jaxx
- Attack
- Audio Antihero
- ATP Recordings
- Aztec Records

== B ==
- B-Unique Records
- Barely Breaking Even
- Beggars Banquet Records
- Believers Roast
- Bella Union
- Benbecula Records
- Best Before Records
- Big Cat Records
- Big Life
- Big Scary Monsters Recording Company
- Blast First
- Bloody Chamber Music
- Blow Up Records
- Bop Cassettes
- Blue Dog Records
- Blue Room Released
- Blue Horizon
- Boy Better Know
- Breakbeat Kaos
- Broadside Hacks
- Bronze Records
- Brownswood Recordings
- Butterz

== C ==
- Caff Records
- Candid Records
- Captain Oi! Records
- Castle Communications
- Catfish Records
- Celtic Music
- Chemikal Underground
- Cherry Red
- Chiswick Records
- Chrysalis (1968–89; since 2016)
- Church Road Records
- Circle Records
- Circus Records
- Clay Records
- Cooking Vinyl
- Communion Music
- Convivium Records
- Crass Records
- Creation Records (1983–1999)
- Creeping Bent
- Creole
- Critical Music
- Cult

== D ==
- Damaged Goods Records
- Damnably
- Dance Concept
- Dance to the Radio
- Decca Records (until 1980; sold to PolyGram, now under UMG)
- Deceptive Records
- Dedicated Records
- Defected Records
- Delphian Records
- Deltasonic
- Demon Music Group
- Dented Records
- Dharma Records
- Dharma Worldwide
- Dick Bros Record Company
- Different Recordings
- Dimension
- Dirty Hit
- Disciple
- DJM Records
- Document Records
- Do It Records
- Domino Recording Company
- Double Denim Records
- Dramatico
- Dreamboat Records
- Drowned in Sound

== E ==
- Earache
- Earworm Records
- The Echo Label
- Edition Records
- E.G. Records
- Él
- Electric Honey
- Ember Records (UK label)
- Emerald Music
- EmuBands
- Erased Tapes Records

== F ==
- Factory Records
- Falling A Records
- Fanfare Records
- Fantastic Plastic Records
- Fashion Records
- Fast Product
- Fat Cat Records
- Fellside Records
- Fence Records
- Fetish Records
- FFRR Records (Pete Tong-owned until 2011)
- Fierce Panda Records
- Finger Lickin' Records
- Fire Records
- Fledg'ling Records
- Fly Records
- FM Records
- FM-Revolver Records
- Food (until 1994; sold to EMI, folded into Parlophone)
- Fortuna Pop!
- Fresh Records
- Fruits de Mer Records
- Full Time Hobby

== G ==
- G&R London
- Gargleblast Records
- Geoma Records
- Gimell Records
- Gingerbread Man Records (2023 Ed Sheeran used this label to Distribute Autumn Variations without Warner Music Group)
- Glass Records
- Go! Discs (until 1996; sold to PolyGram, now under UMG)
- Good Soldier
- Good Vibrations (until 1982)
- Grand Central Records
- Gringo Records
- Grönland Records
- Guided Missile
- Gut Records

== H ==
- Hassle Records
- Heartbeat Productions
- Heaven Records
- Heavenly Recordings
- Heist Or Hit Records
- High Focus Records
- Holy Roar Records
- Honest Jon's
- Hospital Records
- Household Name Records
- How Does It Feel to Be Loved?
- Hudson Records
- Hut Records
- Hyperdub
- Hyperion Records (until 2023; sold to UMG)

== I ==
- Ignition Records
- IHT Records
- Ill Flava Records
- Imaginary Records
- Incentive Records
- Incus Records
- Independiente Records
- Infectious Music
- Instant Karma (record label)
- Invisible Hands Music
- Iona Records
- Irregular Records
- Island Records (until 1989; sold to Polygram, now under UMG)

== J ==
- Jacaranda Records
- JAD Records
- Jazz Refreshed
- Junior Aspirin Records
- Junior Boy's Own
- Jasmine Records
- Jeepster Records
- Josaka
- Jungle Records

== K ==
- Kaycee Records
- Kitchenware Records
- Kold Sweat Records
- Kscope

== L ==
- LAB Records
- Last Night From Glasgow
- Launchpad Records
- Leader Records
- The Leaf Label
- Lex Records
- Linn Records
- Lizard King Records
- Lojinx
- Lo Recordings
- Loog Records
- Loose Music
- Lost Map Records
- Low Life Records
- LTM Recordings
- LuckyMe
- Lyte Records

== M ==
- Magnet Records (until 1988; acquired by Warner Bros)
- Major League Productions (MLP)
- MAM Records
- Mantra Recordings
- Market Square Records
- Marrakesh Records
- Marine Parade Records
- Marshall
- Memphis Industries
- Metalheadz
- Mighty Atom Records
- Ministry of Sound (until 2016; sold to Sony Music (SME))
- Mo' Wax
- Moon Ska World
- Moshi Moshi
- Mr Bongo Records
- Mukatsuku Records
- Mushroom
- Music For Nations
- Mute Records

== N ==
- Naim Edge
- Nation Records
- Native Records
- Navigator Records
- Neat Records
- Nervous Records
- Network
- Nettwerk
- Never Fade Records
- Never Say Die Records
- New Hormones
- Ninja Tune
- No Masters
- NoCopyrightSounds
- Nude
- Nuphonic

== O ==
- Oaken Palace Records
- Odd Box Records
- OddChild Music
- Olive Grove Records
- On the Fiddle
- One Little Independent Records (One Little Indian Records until 2020)
- Or Records
- Oriole Records (until 1965; bought by CBS, became CBS Records, now under SME)
- Outta Sight Records
- Output Recordings
- Oxygen Music Works

== P ==
- PC Music
- Peacefrog Records
- Peaceville Records
- Perfecto Records
- Persistence of Sound
- Pete Waterman Entertainment
- Phantasy Sound
- Placid Casual
- Planet Mu
- Platform Records
- Play It Again Sam
- Pointy Records
- Polydor Records (1954–62; sold to PolyGram's predecessors, now under UMG)
- Postcard Records
- Probe Plus
- Proper Records
- Pye Records

== R ==
- Radiant Future Records
- Ragged Flag
- RareNoiseRecords
- Rak Records
- RAM Records
- React Music Limited until 2004
- Real World Records
- Recommended Records
- Recreational Records
- Red Girl Records
- Regent Records (UK)
- Rekids
- Relentless Records
- Repeat Records
- Revealed Recordings
- Revolver Records
- Rephlex Records
- Rhythm King
- Rinse FM#Rinse Recordings
- Rise Above Records
- Rob's Records
- Rock Action Records
- Rocket Girl
- Ron Johnson Records
- Rough Trade Records

== S ==
- Safari Records
- Saga Entertainment
- Sanctuary Records (until 2012, acquired by BMG)
- Sarah Records
- Sain
- Suburban Base
- Setanta Records
- Shinkansen Records
- Silvertone Records (1980) (until 2017; acquired by Sony)
- SimG Records
- Situation Two
- Skam Records
- Skint Records
- Skinny Dog Records
- Skull Disco
- Sleep It Off Records
- Smalltown America
- Small Wonder Records
- Smash the House
- Snakes & Ladders Records
- Snapper Music
- Soma Quality Recordings
- Some Bizzare Records
- Song, by Toad Records
- Sonic Vista Music
- Sons Ltd.
- Southern Fried Records
- Southern Records
- Specialist Subject Records
- Standby Records
- Static Shock Records
- Steel Tiger Records
- Stiff Records (until 2017; acquired by UMG)
- Stolen Recordings
- Street Soul Productions
- The Subway Organization
- Sunday Best
- Super Records
- Sweat It Out

== T ==
- Takeover Entertainment
- Tectonic (record label)
- Tempa Records
- Temple Records
- Testament Records (UK)
- Text Records
- Third Mind Records
- Tidy Trax
- Tiger Aspect Productions
- Tigertrap Records
- Tin Angel Records
- Tiny Dog Records
- TNSrecords
- Too Pure
- Topic Records
- Touch Music
- Transatlantic Records
- Transcend Music
- Transgressive Records
- Trash Aesthetics
- Triumph Records (UK)
- Trepan Records
- Trend Records
- Tru Thoughts
- Trojan Records
- Truck Records
- Trunk Records
- Tumi Music

== U ==
- Ugly Man Records
- Undergroove Records
- Upset the Rhythm

== V ==
- V Recordings
- V2 Records (until 2007, sold to PIAS Group in 2013 which is no longer an Indie label)
- Valentine Records
- Vertical Records
- The Village Thing
- Vinyl Solution
- The Viper Label
- Virgin Records (until 1992; sold to EMI, now under UMG)
- Visible Noise
- Voiceprint Records
- V/VM

== W ==
- Wall of Sound
- Warm Fuzz Records
- Warp Records
- Weekender Records
- Werkdiscs
- Whirlwind Recordings
- Wichita Recordings
- Willkommen Records
- Wiiija
- Woof Records
- World Circuit
- Wrath Records

== X ==
- XL Recordings
- Xtra Mile Recordings

== Y ==
- Y Records
- Yellowdog Creative Project Management
- Young formerly Young Turks from 2006 – April 2021

== Z ==
- Zoo Records
- ZTT Records (until 2017; acquired by UMG)

== See also ==
- List of record labels
- List of electronic music record labels
