= Steph Fraser =

- Born: Stephanie Fraser; Blackpool, England
- Origin: Lancashire, England
- Genre: Folk rock
- Occupation: Singer-songwriter
- Instruments: Vocals, guitar, piano
- Years active: 2005–present
- Label: –

Stephanie Fraser is an English folk rock, singer-songwriter from Lancashire, England.

== Early life and education ==
Steph Fraser was born in Blackpool, England.

She graduated from Rossall School, a public school in Fleetwood. Fraser was signed by Island Records when she was studying at Leeds College of Music.

== Career ==
Fraser has toured extensively in the UK and Canada including 2007 performances at the BBC Radio 2 Blackpool Illuminations Switch On Event, where she played in front of 19,000 people and shared the bill with McFly, Natalie Imbruglia and Natasha Bedingfield. This was after she had won the Blackpool Evening Gazette young talent contest.

The recordings, which were overseen by Canadian producer Dan Achen resulted in her first EP "Purple Sun" being released in May the same year. The single was well received with R2 (Rock'n'Reel) magazine saying she had real potential.

The single was also featured on the BBC Radio Merseyside show "On The Beat" hosted by Spencer Leigh. One of the panel members was Sam Leach the former Beatles mentor and promoter who said that Fraser was heading for the big time and that he could "listen to her all night".

Fraser parted company with collaborator Stephen Ladley in 2008, and began working with young musician Phil Simpson. She performed for the second time at both Canadian Music Week 2009 and Liverpool Sound City 2009 as a showcasing artist.

She released her second EP Pretend in May 2009, which used a song from the Catherine North Studios sessions, and also two tracks recorded at Spacehouse Studios in London. Rupert Greenall from the band The Fixx also collaborated and played on the tracks.

In June 2009, Fraser and Simpson recruited Cajon player Matt Lockwood and started touring as a trio, and played at the Beverley Folk Festival, the Hull Freedom Festival and the Musicport World Music Festival in Bridlington. The third EP Recession Proof was released on Sonic Vista Music in November 2009. Fraser opened for British comedian Phil Cool at two shows in November and December 2009. In 2010, she left Sonic Vista Records and embarked on a new path.

== Discography ==
=== EPs ===
- Purple Sun (2008 – SVRCD005)
- Pretend (2009 – SVRCD008)
- Recession Proof (2009 – SVRCD013)

=== LP ===
- When We Make It (2026 – Steph Fraser)
