= Nik Weston =

- Origin: United Kingdom
- Genres: Jazz, soul jazz, dance music
- Occupations: DJ, record label owner, promoter
- Years active: 1994–present
- Labels: Mukatsuku Records
- Website: Mukatsuku at Facebook

Nik Weston is a DJ, music producer, record label owner of Mukatsuku Records and music buyer for Juno Records. Based out of London, UK, he was from the late 1990s to 2007 a key player in the promotion and distribution of Japanese recording artists and their releases outside of the country, as part of the late 1990s into 2000s revival in the jazz dance, soul-jazz and electronic Japanese music scene. He is a keen advocate of the vinyl record format.

== Career ==
Nik Weston first entered the London dance music scene in 1994, when he started the club night Phony. He and two other friends then started a club night in Soho called Mukatsuku in 1997. It ran for 2 years from 1997 – 1999 upstairs at two floor room Club in London China Town called The Clinic, and was nominated by London Evening Standard Newspaper as 'club night of the year'.

He started the label Mukatsuku Records in 2006 after DJing as part of the Mukatsuku Crew since 1997. Weston started up a promotional company called Mukatsuku PR in 2001, doing consulting and promotion for labels such as Verve Records, Impulse, Sonar Kollektiv, Schema Records, and Ricky Tick amongst others.

As a DJ, he's played over 30 countries and supported Gilles Peterson, Jazzanova, and others. Since 2001 Weston has put out over 100 releases on various labels in the US, Europe and Japan, and over 80 releases on his own Mukatsuku Records.

== Discography ==
=== Production credits ===
Year	Release title	Artist(s)	Label	Role
2001	Inner Flight	Jazztronik	Counterpoint Records	A&R
2002	Moshi Moshi – Nu Sounds From Japan	Various	Fuego Records	compiler
2002	Music & Movement One	Various	Climate Records	compiler
2003	Take Me Aosis – A Nite Out in London	Various	Aosis Records	compiler
2003	Light Years	Calm	Lastrum	translation
2004	Habit	Butti 49	Exceptional Records	liner notes
2006	Even Though / What You Do	Paul Mac Innes and TBOI	Mukatsuku Records	A&R
2007	The Opensouls EP	Opensouls, The Tornadoes, Tyra Hammond	Mukatsuku Records	A&R

=== DJ mixes ===
The following releases Weston compiled and/or did the DJ mix as a presenter, sometimes also handling A&R.

- 2003: Nik Weston Presents – Sakura Aural Bliss (Kriztal Entertainment)
- 2004: Various – Exceptionally Remixed (Exceptional Records)
- 2004: Various – The Sound of Club Brasil Vol. 1 (Club Brasil)
- 2005: Various – The Sound of Club Brasil Vol. 2 (Club Brasil)
- 2005: Various – Nu[new] Style Vol. 3 – Living in the Music: Nik Weston (Nuro)
- 2006: Routine Jazz Presents – Diggin For Gems (Routine Records)
- 2007: Nik Weston presents Jabberloop – Ugetsu (Mukatsuku Records)
- 2007: Nik Weston presents West/Rock/Woods – Love Cats (Mukatsuku Records)
- 2007: Nik Weston presents Hanna & Beatr8 – Better Than Nothing (Mukatsuku Records)
- 2007: Nik Weston presents Guynamite – Guynamite (Mukatsuku Records)
- 2008: Nik Weston presents Guynamite – Guynamite EP 02 (Mukatsuku Records)
- 2008: Nik Weston presents The Funky Instrumentals 45 – Volume Two (Mukatsuku Records)
- 2008: Nik Weston presents Gagle – The Funky Instrumentals Volume Three (Mukatsuku Records)
- 2008: Nik Weston presents Big Horns Bee / Big Bang – The Big 7 Inch (Mukatsuku Records)
- 2009: Nik Weston presents Grant Green / Orquesta De La Luz – Funky Instrumentals Volume Four (Mukatsuku Records)
- 2009: Nik Weston presents j.a.m / Jazztronik – Japanese Jazz With Attitude (Mukatsuku Records)
- 2009: Nik Weston presents Kaleta & Akoya Afrobeat – The Spirit of Fela Is Alive And Well! (Mukatsuku Records)
- 2009: Nik Weston presents Guynamite – Born In '82 EP (Mukatsuku Records)
- 2009: Nik Weston presents Jazztronik – Disco Boogie (Mukatsuku Records)
- 2010: Nik Weston presents Hundred Strong Ft. Amp Fiddler Vs Guynamukat – Stylin' Free EP (Guynamukat Remixes) (Mukatsuku Records)
- 2011: Nik Weston presents Mixed Grill – Brand New Wayo – Nigerian Afro Funk Boogie Badness (Mukatsuku Records)
- 2012: Nik Weston presents Afro Funk Gems – Volume 1: Music of West Africa (Mukatsuku Records)
- 2012: Nik Weston presents Afro Funk Gems – Volume 2: Music of West Africa (Mukatsuku Records)
- 2012: Nik Weston presents Wganda Kenya & M'Bamina – Afro Funk Gems Volume Three (Mukatsuku Records)
- 2013: Nik Weston presents African Souls Band / Wganda Kenya – Afro Funk Gems Volume Four (Mukatsuku Records)
- 2013: Nik Weston presents Guynamukat – Archway Riviera Tropical Jam EP (Mukatsuku Records)
- 2013: Nik Weston presents Wganda Kenya/ Fruko Y Sus Tesos – Colombian Funk & Latin Gems 45 (Mukatsuku Records)
- 2014: Nik Weston presents Guynamukat Vs Eufoquestra – Ogun EP (Mukatsuku Records)
- 2014: Nik Weston presents Marcia Hines / Jackie Wilson – Lost Soul & Funk Gems Vol 1 (Mukatsuku Records)
- 2014: Nik Weston presents Orlando Julius And His Afro Sounders – James Brown Rides On (Mukatsuku Records)
- 2014: Nik Weston presents Loleatta Hollway/Ron Henderson And Choice of Colour – Lost Soul & Funk Gems Vol 2 (Mukatsuku Records)
- 2014: Nik Weston presents Marco Di Marco/ Jazz Collective – Two Sides of Club Jazz (Mukatsuku Records)
- 2015: Nik Weston presents Jo Togo/Sookie – Afro Funk Gems Vol Five (Mukatsuku Records)
- 2015: Nik Weston presents Sharon Revoal/Swan Silvertones – Soulful Funk & Gospel Soul (Mukatsuku Records)
- 2015: Nik Weston presents The Chapparrals/The Diddys – Lost Funk Soul & Disco Gems Volume Three (Mukatsuku Records)
- 2015: Nik Weston presents Courtial/Sounds of the City Experience – Lost Soul & Funk Gems Volume Four (Mukatsuku Records)
- 2016: Nik Weston presents Rim & Kasa/Rim Kwaku Obeng – Mukatsuku Vs BBE Official Edits (Mukatsuku Records)
- 2016: Nik Weston presents Estiban – Lost Funk & Disco Gems Volume Five (Mukatsuku Records)

=== A&R ===
- 2016: Marius Cultier / Dimenzio – Two Sides of Club Jazz – Hungary Vs France (Mukatsuku Records)
- 2016: Poets of Rhythm / Wallace Brothers – Funk Monsters Vol One (Mukatsuku Records)
- 2016: Mavis John / Guy Benton & Nik Weston – Trinidad Funk Vs Archway Riviera (Mukatsuku Records)
- 2016: Ojeda Penn – Lost Funk & Disco Gems Volume Six (Mukatsuku Records)
- 2016: Roy Ayers – Funk & Soulful Side of Roy Ayers (Mukatsuku Records)
- 2016: Suzy Brown / Anne & Anice Peters – Reggae Disco Special (Mukatsuku Records)
- 2016: Pearl Dowdell / Billy Cee & Freedom Express – Funk Monsters Volume Two (Mukatsuku Records)
- 2016: Three Pieces / Johnny Hammond – Mukatsuku Presents on First Time on a 45 Classics Volume One (Mukatsuku Records)
- 2016: Billy Hawks – Two Sides of Funky Club Jazz Volume Three – Mod Jazz Edition (Mukatsuku Records)

== Mukatsuku Records ==
Mukatsuku Records
- Founded: 2006
- Founder: Nik Weston
- Status: Active
- Distributor: Self (vinyl only)
- Genre: Jazz, Soul-Jazz
- Location: London, UK
- Official website: Mukatsuku Facebook

Mukatsuku Records is a record label started by Nik Weston in 2006, based out of London, UK. The label's general style of music is soul/funk/jazz/disco related and defined as dance music and/or black music of various origins. Many of the early releases were part of the jazz dance scene. Often, though not always, the music has a focus on Japanese recording artists. Mukatsuku Records releases all of its music on vinyl and releases neither albums nor digital content.

=== History ===
British DJ Nik Weston and two other friends started a club night in Soho, London called Mukatsuku in 1997. It ran for 2 years from 1997–1999 in an upstairs two floor room club in London China Town called "The Clinic", and were nominated by London Evening Standard Newspaper as 'club night of the year'. According to Weston, the name Mukatsuku translates in Japanese 'to feel sick, irritated or offended', and was picked as a subtle jibe at an acquaintance's use of the word as a catchphrase.

While A&Ring for Exceptional Records, Weston realized it was difficult to sign artists for single releases, so he endeavoured to start a vinyl-only, singles-only label. The label has since put out English, Japanese, Scandinavian and even New Zealand tracks. According to JellyJazz, "The Mukatsuku label is one of the best selling independent vinyls [sic] labels in the UK, and it is ONLY vinyls [sic]."

=== Catalogue ===
Cat. No.	Artist	Title	Format	Year
MUKAT001	Paul Mac Innes and TBOI	Even Though / What You Do	7"	2006
MUKAT002	Opensouls, The Tornadoes & Tyra Hammond	The Opensouls EP	12"	2007
MUKAT003	Nik Weston presents Jabberloop	Ugetsu	12"	2007
MUKAT004	Nik Weston presents West/Rock/Woods	Love Cats	10"	2007
MUKAT005	Nik Weston presents Hanna & Beatr8	Better Than Nothing	12"	2007
MUKAT006	Nik Weston presents Guynamite	Guynamite	12"	2007
MUKAT007	Gagle (DJ Mitsu The Beats Production)	The Funky Instrumentals 45	7"	2008
MUKAT008	Nik Weston	The Funky Instrumentals 45 (Volume Two)	7"	2008
MUKAT009	Nik Weston presents Guynamite	Guynamite EP 02	12"	2008
MUKAT010	Nik Weston presents Gagle	The Funky Instrumentals (Volume Three)	7"	2008
MUKAT011	Nik Weston presents Big Horns Bee / Big Bang	The Big 7 Inch	7"	2008
MUKAT012	Nik Weston presents Grant Green / Orquesta De La Luz	Funky Instrumentals (Volume Four)	12"	2009
MUKAT013	Nik Weston presents j.a.m / Jazztronik	Japanese Jazz With Attitude	12"	2009
MUKAT014	Nik Weston presents Kaleta & Akoya Afrobeat	The Spirit of Fela Is Alive And Well!	12"	2009
MUKAT015	Nik Weston presents Guynamite	Born In '82 EP	12"	2009
MUKAT016	Nik Weston presents Jazztronik	Disco Boogie	12"	2009
MUKAT017	Nik Weston presents Makoto & Kez Ym featuring Takumi Kaneko from Cro Magnon	Chameleon	12" ltd, 180 gram	2009
MUKAT018	Tom Middleton presents Chiswick Reach All Stars	The Nutsin	7", S/Sided, ltd	2010
MUKAT019	Nik Weston presents Sunaga T Experience	Japanese Jazz Special	7" ltd	2010
MUKAT020	Twin Cities	"Raincloud / Anticipation"	Single	2010
MUKAT021	Nik Weston presents Hundred Strong Feat Amp Fiddler Vs Guynamukat	Stylin' Free EP (Guynamukat Remixes)	EP	2010
MUKAT022	Nik Weston presents Root Soul	Fuselage: The Unreleased Afrobeat Remixes	12" ltd	2010
MUKAT023	Nik Weston presents Mixed Grill	Brand New Wayo – Nigerian Afro Funk Boogie Badness	7" ltd	2011
MUKAT024	Nik Weston Presents Orchestre Baobab/ Mousa Doumbia	Nik Weston Presents Afro Funk Gems Volume 1: Music of West Africa	7"	2012
MUKAT025	Nik Weston Presents Archimedes Badar & Afro 70/Ekambi Brillant	Nik Weston Presents Afro Funk Gems Volume Two: Music of West Africa	7" ltd	2012
MUKAT026	Nik Weston presents Wganda Kenya & M'Bamina	Afro Funk Gems Volume Three	7" ltd	2012
MUKAT027	Nik Weston presents African Souls Band / Wganda Kenya	Afro Funk Gems Volume Four	7" ltd	2013
MUKAT028	Nik Weston Presents Guynamukat	Archway Riviera Tropical Jam EP	12"	2013
MUKAT029	Nik Weston Presents Wganda Kenya/ Fruko Y Sus Tesos	Colombian Funk & Latin Gems 45	7"	2013
MUKAT030	Nik Weston Presents Guynamukat Vs Eufoquestra	Ogun EP	12"	2014
MUKAT031	Nik Weston Presents Marcia Hines /Jackie Wilson	Lost Soul & Funk Gems Vol 1	7"	2014
MUKAT032	Nik Weston Presents Orlando Julius And His Afro Sounders	James Brown Rides On	10"	2014
MUKAT033	Nik Weston Presents Loleatta Hollway/Ron Henderson And Choice of Colour	Lost Soul & Funk Gems Vol 2	7"	2014
MUKAT034	Nik Weston Presents Marco Di Marco/ Jazz Collective	Two Sides of Club Jazz	7"	2014
MUKAT035	Nik Weston Presents Jo Togo/Sookie	Afro Funk Gems Vol Five	7"	2015
MUKAT036	Nik Weston Presents Sharon Revoal/Swan Silvertones	Soulful Funk & Gospel Soul	7"	2015
MUKAT037	Nik Weston Presents The Chapparrals/The Diddys	Lost Funk Soul & Disco Gems Volume Three	7"	2015
MUKAT038	Nik Weston Presents Courtial/Sounds of the City Experience	Lost Soul & Funk Gems Volume Four	7"	2015
MUKAT042	Nik Weston Presents Rim & Kasa/Rim Kwaku Obeng	Mukatsuku V’s BBE Official edits	12"	
MUKAT043	Nik Weston presents Estiban	Lost Funk & Disco Gems Volume Four	7"	
MUKAT044	Marius Cultier / Dimenzio	Two Sides of Club Jazz – Hungary Vs France	7"	
MUKAT045	Poets of Rhythm / Wallace Brothers	Funk Monsters Vol One	7"	
MUKAT046	Mavis John / Guy Benton & Nik Weston	Trinidad Funk V’s Archway Riviera	7"	
MUKAT047	Ojeda Penn	Lost Funk & Disco Gems Volume Six	7"	
MUKAT048	Roy Ayers	Funk & Soulful Side of Roy Ayers	7"	
MUKAT049	Suzy Brown / Anne & Anice Peters	Reggae Disco Special	7"	
MUKAT050	Pearl Dowdell / Billy Cee & Freedom Express	Funk Monsters Volume Two	7"	
MUKAT051	Three Pieces / Johnny Hammond	Mukatsuku Presents on First Time on a 45 Classics Volume One	7"	
MUKAT052	Billy Hawks	Two Sides of Funky Club Jazz Volume Three – Mod Jazz Edition	7"	

== See also ==
- List of independent UK record labels
