= Stevie Hyper D =

Background information
- Born: Stephen Austin; 20 September 1966; London, England
- Died: 5 July 1998 (aged 31)
- Genres: Electronic; drum and bass; jungle; hip hop
- Occupations: Vocalist; MC
- Labels: Dance Concept; Island
- Website: https://www.steviehyperd.com/

Stevie Hyper D (born Stephen Austin, 20 September 1966 – 5 July 1998) was a British drum and bass MC.

== Early life ==
Stephen Austin was born in London, England on 20 September 1966, to a Spanish mother and Barbadian father.

== Career ==
Austin was one of the pioneering MCs in the drum and bass-jungle scene. He has been credited with inventing the "Double Time" MCing style, where he would double the speed of the generic MC flow but would still fit within the bars of the music.

Austin was the first drum and bass MC to have a major release when The Next Step was released on Island Records in 1999. He also had an album, The Legend, which was released on the independent drum and bass label Dance Concept and produced by Benny V. Austin performed on BBC Radio 1 and Kool FM radio shows (the latter usually with Nicky Blackmarket. His track "Buffalo Soldier" from the album was nominated for DNBA tune of the year in 2004.

Austin is widely accepted as one of the true pioneering drum and bass MCs. It is also accepted that he was the innovator of the 'double time' MC style that is commonly used today. Appearing first on the 1991 track "Teknoragga", Austin went on to record tracks across various genres, from jungle, to hip hop and even to house music. He was the first drum and bass MC to secure an album with a major label, Island Records. The Next Step, with his producer Dfrnt Lvls, was released in 1999, a year after his death.

== Death ==
Hyper D died on 5 July 1998 from a heart attack.

== Discography ==
=== Albums ===
- The Next Step (1999), Island Records

=== Singles ===
- "Teknoragga" (1991), Reverb Records
- "Boomshakalack" with Ils (1995), Made in London Records
- "Life Is Funny" (1999), Island Records
- "All I Wanna Do / Move Your Body" (2003), Dance Concept
- "Flexin Today / Junglist Soldier" (2006), Dance Concept
- "Aint No Stoppin Us Now / Buffalo Soldier" (2007), Dance Concept
