= Valentine Records =

British independent record label

- Founded: 2001
- Genre: Various
- Country of origin: United Kingdom
- Location: Manchester

Valentine Records is a British independent record label, based in Manchester, England and founded in September 2001.

Its initial roster comprised guitar bands such as Extinguish Her, Chevron, Palo Alto and Five Years Later as well as electronic/laptop artists such as I-Node, doublejo(H)ngrey, Lynskey, Ultrafoetus and The Hi Fi Renaissance.

At present the roster comprises Mark Corrin (aka Shirokuma, formerly of Faith & Hope Records), John Callaghan (also of Warp Records/Uncharted Audio), Babyslave, I-Lucifer, Still Forever, Pandemonium, Dirty Mice, Gleick and Reigns of Monty Carlo.

International guest artists include Neil Milton (Warsaw), No-way Sweden (Melbourne), Red Martian (Seattle), Warscapes (Paris) and Daniel Maze (Vancouver).

Valentine has also promoted a variety of live events over the years, including showcases at Manchester's In The City and Futuresonic Festivals, alongside the clubnights To Amy With Love, Transmission: Manchester, Rebellious Jukebox, TAGO>MAGO and SOUND>VISION. In 2016, along with AnalogueTrash Records, the label hosted the two day FOUNDATIONS micro-festival, celebrating grassroots live music, creative collaboration, community networking and multimedia art/film and performance.

Featured live acts have included Cylob, Max Tundra, Capitol K, ¡Forward, Russia!, Damo Suzuki, Kylie Minoise and iLiKETRAiNS.

== Discography ==
Artist	Title	Cat No
The Hi Fi Renaissance	4 Track EP	Valentine 001
Extinguish Her	Reflect on My Mistakes	Valentine 002
Five Years Later	My Identical EP	Valentine 003
Chevron	Keep Two Apart/Twisted & Fallen	Valentine 004
Palo Alto	Still EP	Valentine 005
Various	A Valentine Records Sampler	Valentine 006
I-Node	La Souteneur Numerique	Valentine 007
Palo Alto	Wades into Water	Valentine 008
doublejo(H)ngrey	Life's A Lot of Fun	Valentine 009
Various	To Amy With Love	Valentine 010
Lynskey	The Complete Guide to Spacefolk	Valentine 011
Cartwheel	Man: In Love with Machine EP	Valentine 012
Joe Ladyboy	Mekano Disco	Valentine 013
Penguin Map Mijinko	Corporate Policy EP	Valentine 014
Ultrafoetus	EP1	Valentine 015
Extinguish Her	Hit My Head	Valentine 016
Penguin Map Mijinko	Adventure Island	Valentine 017
Babyslave	Babyslave	Valentine 018
The Hi Fi Renaissance	The Music of Chance	Valentine 019
Various	Dirty Valentine	Valentine 020

== See also ==
- List of independent UK record labels
