= Sonic Vista Music =

Independent English record label

- Founded: 2005; 21 years ago
- Founder: Kenneth Foster; Terence Dunn; Ian Smith; Simon Lewis; Dale Smith
- Genre: Alternative rock Acoustic; Indie rock Classic rock
- Country of origin: England
- Location: Hull (2005–2006), Blackpool (2006–present)
- Official website: www.sonicvistamusic.co.uk

Sonic Vista Music is an independent English record label, founded in Kingston upon Hull in 2005, notable for having business connections in Japan and Canada.

== History ==
Founded by the members of the band Ernest, and shortly afterwards by promoter and Strummer music magazine editor, Ken Foster, the label sought to escape the confines of the heavily London weighted UK music industry by exploring overseas markets, particularly Canada and Japan. This has led to the formation of Jaded Rebel Entertainment in Canada and Sonic Vista Japan.

The first release was Pimps, B**ches (and Superheroes) by Ernest in 2005. Ernest were the only band on the label until Foster joined later that year. With the second Ernest EP release Puppies, the band were able to secure slots at the Leeds Festival in 2006. and then a mini-tour of Japan in 2007.

The label also released a compilation album, World of Expectation, featuring Goldblade and Roovel Oobik in the same year. The Japan trip attracted interest from BMG Japan who having heard the album demo's had requested a fully mixed and mastered copy. The band split up during this process without any official announcement although a review of the band's final gig goes some way to explaining the fractures that were appearing. The album remained unreleased although it was given the catalogue number SVRCD006.

The label had already signed acts such as the avant garde indie jazz outfit, Eveline, from Bologna, Italy and the singer-songwriter, Steph Fraser.

The label has continued to release music which eschews the mainstream and has focused much of its energy into developing the careers of Steph Fraser in the UK and Canada and also Man-made Noise in Japan. Man-made Noise embarked on a 20 date tour of Japan, and will be returning for a second tour in October 2009. Fraser toured Canada in August 2008 and showcased at Canadian Music Week. in 2008 and 2009.

The label is distributed physically in the UK and Worldwide by Code 7, and digitally by Believe.

2009 saw the release of the label's first DVD, which formed part of the package for the release of the CD by IT.

In 2010 and 2011, the label focused more on progressive rock, and moved away from commercial genres. The first of this new direction was the release by Dropshard, with their concept album, Anywhere But Home, issued on 15 February 2011.

In 2013, the label added a third progressive rock band to its roster. Machines Dream are a progressive rock band from Sault Ste Marie, Ontario, Canada. Their debut album Machines Dream was made available free on the Aurovine digital music platform.

== Artists past and present ==
- Andy Stedman
- Aron Paul
- The Automatic Heart
- Cascade Sounds
- Dropshard
- Ernest
- Eveline
- Father
- Fonda 500
- Goldblade
- IT
- Litterbug (UK)
- Machines Dream
- Man-made Noise
- MM2
- Nth Ascension
- Roovel Oobik
- Steph Fraser
- Sinister Footwear
- Unspeakable Easels

== Discography ==
- Ernest – Pimps, B**ches (and Superheroes) EP (SVRCD000, 2005)
- Ernest – Puppies EP (SVRCD001, 2006)
- Cascade Sounds – Hope in Sound EP (SVRCD003, 2007)
- Eveline – Waking Up Before Dawn (SVRCD004, 2008)
- Steph Fraser – Purple Sun EP (SVRCD005, 2008)
- Ernest – Crash Tested (Unreleased Album) (SVRCD006, 2008)
- Man-Made Noise – Man-made Noise (SVRCD007, 2008)
- Steph Fraser – Pretend EP (SVRCD008, 2009)
- Andy Stedman – "You Keep Me Up 'Till 3 O'Clock" single (SVRCD009, 2009)
- IT – Departure CD/DVD (SVRCD010, 2009)
- Litterbug – Speaking Through The Gaps (SVRCD011, 2009)
- IT – Over & Out (SVRCD012, 2009)
- Steph Fraser – Recession Proof EP (SVRCD013,2010)
- Aron Paul – The Stranger I Know (SVRCD014, 2010)
- Man-made Noise – Photocopy Machine single (SVRCD015, 2010)
- Aron Paul – Angel Calling (SVRCD016, 2010)
- Dropshard – Anywhere But Home (SVRCD017, 2011)
- Dropshard – Silk (AUROEX035, 2014)
- Machines Dream – Immunity (AUROEX044, 2014)
- Nth Ascension – Ascension Of Kings (AUROEX045, 2014)

=== Compilations ===
- World of Expectation (SVRCD002)

== See also ==
- List of record labels
- List of independent UK record labels
