= Machines Dream =

Canadian progressive rock band

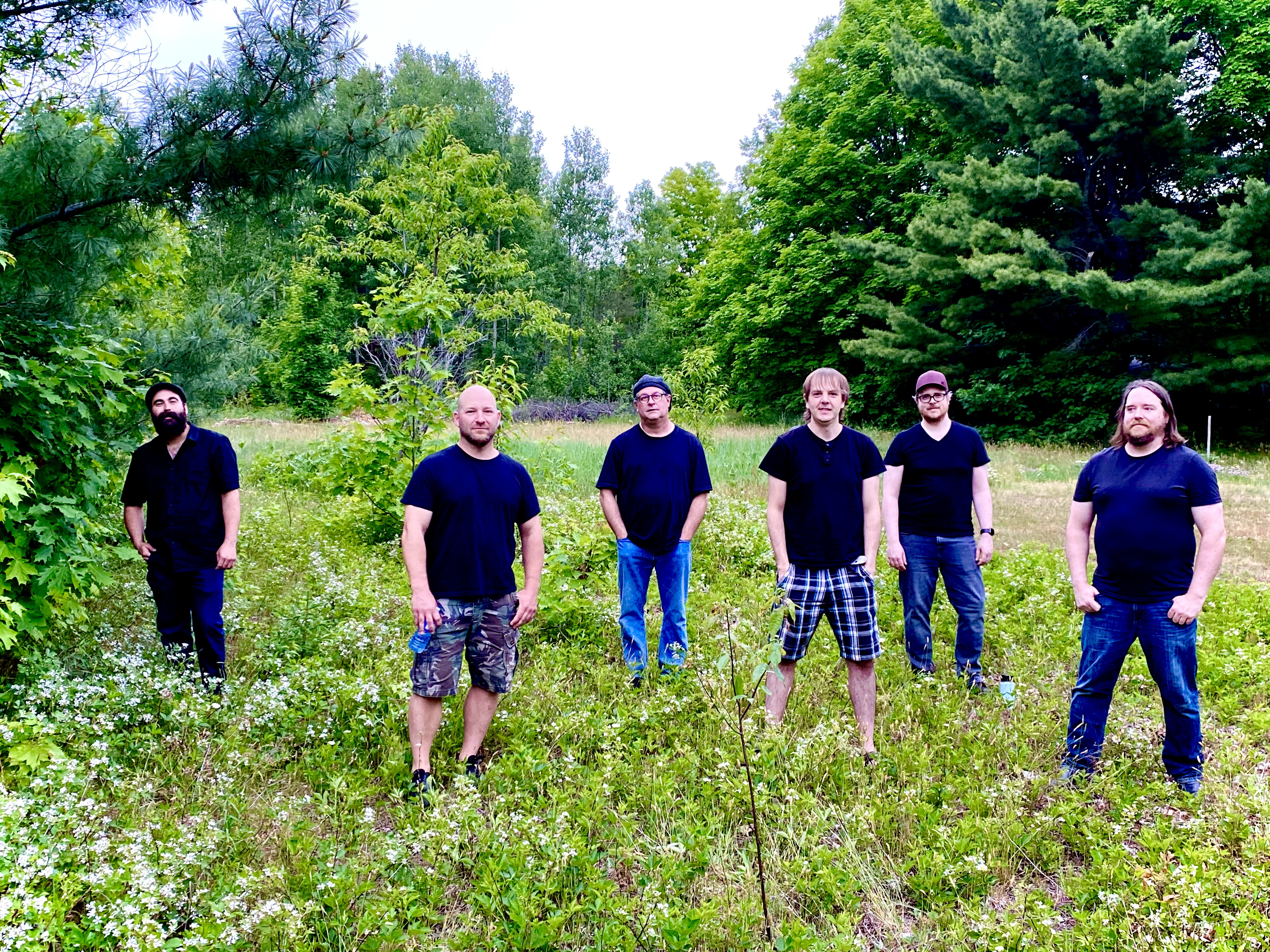
- Machines Dream; Left to right: Rendell, Greco, West, Holmes, Coleman, Conway

Background information
- Origin: Sault Ste. Marie, Ontario, Canada
- Genres: Progressive rock, neo-prog, cross-over prog
- Years active: 2010–present
- Labels: Progressive Gears
- Members: Craig West; Rob Coleman; Phil Greco; Brian Holmes; Keith Conway; Jacob Rendell; Eugene Rogers (Progressive Gears Management)
- Past members: Shayne Wigglesworth; Marco Pierucci; Ken Coulter
- Website: machinesdream.com

Machines Dream are a Canadian progressive rock band from Sault Ste. Marie, Ontario. The group are defined by their accessible progressive rock sound, and recognition through the Internet. The band has functioned internationally despite geographic distance from their audience and – in 2016 – signed to Progressive Gears Records – a subsidiary of Progressive Gears Management – in Northern Ireland. Machines Dream was founded in 2008 and the current line-up consists of Craig West (Bass/Vocals), Brian Holmes (Keyboards), Phil Greco (Drums), Rob Coleman (Guitar), Keith Conway (Guitar), and Jake Rendell (Acoustic Guitar/Vocals/Percussion). Machines Dream released their self-titled debut in 2012, followed in 2014 with the sophomore album Immunity and digital EP 100 Afternoons. Their third album, Black Science, was released in 2016 to relative widespread praise from European radio stations and internet radio prog fans. A follow-up to Black Science was Machines Dream's live off the floor recording at Revelle Studio's in their hometown. Following a hiatus after the release of Black Science, the band announced a new album would be released in early 2022.

== History ==
=== Origins ===
Machines Dream were formed in 2008 when Craig West (lead vocals, bass guitar), Brian Holmes (keyboards), Ken Coulter (drums), and Shayne Wigglesworth (guitar) began jamming regularly following a one-off performance to fulfil a contractual obligation of West's. In 2009, the group added Marco Pierucci on bass guitar, allowing West to play second guitar, and recorded demos that would be the basis of their first album. In 2010 Pierucci left the band so prompting West to return to the role of bassist/vocalist.

=== Self-titled album ===
Their first album, self-titled Machines Dream, was recorded by Craig West at his home studio, Bear Dog Digital, beginning in late 2010 and was released on March 15, 2012. During the recording process, Wigglesworth left the band and was replaced by guitarist Keith Conway. The quartet of West, Holmes, Coulter and Conway played regularly in their hometown throughout 2012 and 2013.

Many of the lyrics on the first album deal with mental illness and alienation in one form or another. For example, London By Night was written after West suffering a panic attack while visiting London, England; Unarmed At Sea is about vulnerability and features image-heavy lyrics written by singer/songwriter and associate of the band Chris Belsito; and Toronto Skyline is about feelings of loneliness being amplified by living in or visiting a large city. Of the album's two longer tracks, the lyrics for the song Mad For All Seasons were written about conspiracy theorists, while The Session was partly written by Belsito after hearing the rest of the songs on the album and offering a set of lyrics that he felt reflected the entire album.

Musically the album reflects the band's influences as well as the sound of the group jamming. Guitarist Keith Conway's melodic blues lead style worked well with the Pink Floyd influenced Toronto Skyline and Colder Rain. Brian Holmes, who had previously played with metal band Gates Of Winter brought symphonic elements to the sound of the album. West and Coulter practiced extensively together to develop a rhythm section that would blend modern and classic prog elements. The band chose to release their first album through Aurovine, an artist-centric distribution service that allowed the band to release the album using a "pay what you want" model. Machines Dream was consistently among the most downloaded artists on Aurovine including holding the Number One spot in the Aurovine download chart for over one year. To capitalize on this online breakthrough, the band began investing time in social media, using Twitter, Facebook and YouTube to communicate directly with their growing fan base, largely located in the United Kingdom and United States.

=== Immunity / 100 Afternoons ===
Shortly after the band's appearance at their community's Rotaryfest Second Stage music festival on July 20, 2013, Keith Conway left the band. Unsure of the group's future, West, Holmes, and Coulter spent a weekend retreat jamming at Coulter's cabin, located north of Sault Ste. Marie, and decided that Machines Dream had a distinct identity greater than the sum of its parts and that they would carry on. The trio began working on the band's second album throughout the remainder of 2013, writing and recording new material. West played guitar, bass and provided lead vocals, Holmes played keyboards and bass, and Coulter played the drums. As recording progressed, the band added two session players, Rob Coleman on lead guitar and Jake Rendell on backing vocals (who had also recorded the backing vocals on the first album) to help complete the album. The album was once again recorded and mixed at West's Bear Dog Digital studio, with additional recording at Case's Music.

According to West, the 26-minute title track, also co-written by Chris Belsito, is about media desensitization, using immunization as a metaphor. In the same way a person can be immunized against a disease, he suggests that most people have bombarded themselves with so much information on a daily basis between news, entertainment and advertising that they have become numb to situations or information that should be shocking or upsetting. The three shorter songs, Battersea Transcendental, My Ocean Is Electric and Broken Door were written for the first album, but were not recorded at the time. Musically the album has a colder feel than its predecessor, most noticeable in the lack of acoustic guitar and tense arrangements. Immunity features saxophone performed by guest musician Josh Norling and, as with the first album, some lyrics were contributed by songwriter Chris Belsito. Machines Dream completed recording Immunity by summer 2014, with mixing and mastering continuing throughout the autumn. The album's mastering and duplication process were crowd-funded using the Fundervine platform. Immunity was released on December 2, 2014, through Sonic Vista, a record label owned by Aurovine.

Immediately following the sessions for Immunity, the band recorded a digital-only five song EP, 100 Afternoons, which was offered as a bonus incentive to those who pre-ordered Immunity. The EP consisted of tracks that were written between 2009 and 2012, partly recorded, but unfinished. The band felt these songs did not fit either album and they had been left off for that reason, however the EP has generated some fan favourites including the upbeat Jupiter and the ballad Trading Stars For Solitude.

Following the release of Immunity, the band were featured several times on Stafford Radio's The Prog Mill, a weekly radio show that showcases progressive rock, hosted by Shaun Geraghty. Machines Dream played Indie Week in Toronto, on October 16 and 17, 2014 becoming semi-finalists. Also in October, Coleman and Rendell were offered, and accepted, full-time membership in the band, officially making the group a quintet for the first time since 2009. The now five piece began rehearsing heavily following the release of Immunity, and the chemistry between the members led to the group's most stable line-up as well as its most characteristic voice to date. Writing songs organically and collectively had always been a goal for Machines Dream and, with the current line-up this method of song writing has been realized.

=== Progressive Gears ===
In early 2014, the band became acquainted with Eugene Rogers and Progressive Gears Management. Rogers discovered Machines Dream while he was looking for music by the progressive band IT, which he discovered on the Aurovine website. While there, he saw a free download of the first Machines Dream album and decided to listen to it on speculation. He enjoyed the album and began recommending the group to several progressive rock radio shows, including the Prog Mill hosted by Shaun Geraghty. The band and Rogers connected via Twitter and discovered that they had a common philosophical outlook on music and the business of music. In July 2014 the band asked Rogers if he was interested in taking on managing Machines Dream to which he agreed. Rogers began promoting the music to as many people as possible using both traditional marketing methods as well as working with new social media tools and reaching out to established progressive artists and musicians. The results have been an increase in plays on specialist Internet radio stations that meet the demand for new Progressive Rock. This led to the growth of a global audience for Machines Dream.

=== Record ===
While Black Science was being mixed, the band went into the studio to record songs for radio broadcast on Guy Bellamy's Great Music Stories radio show on Meridian FM (links). The band performed older songs as well as tracks from the as yet unreleased Black Science album but experimented significantly with the arrangements. Josh Norling was brought in to play saxophone along with the band adding jazz elements to their sound, and the sessions featured an improvisational quality.

The group had originally planned on recording three songs for the radio broadcast, but came out of the recording sessions with over four hours of music. The band were happy with the quality of the material and decided to release the songs that were recorded as a download-only album. It was released for free on Christmas Day, 2016 as a gift to fans and became available later on all streaming services. The second half of these recordings were made available as part of the pre-order for Black Science and featured entirely instrumental improvisations.

=== Black Science ===
On April 22, 2016, Machines Dream announced the title of their upcoming third album, Black Science and accompanied the announcement with a digital single, Heavy Water. The album was originally slated for release in late summer 2016, but was held back to accommodate additional recording which was completed in late 2016. On May 15, 2017, the band announced a pre-order for Black Science, with a release date of June 12, 2017. Pre-orders were accompanied by a digital EP of bonus tracks called IMPROV which would only be available during the pre-order and not released again. A second digital single, Airfield On Sunwick (For Wojtek) was released to coincide with the pre-order campaign. Musically, the album marks the first time that the band's material has been written collaboratively with all the songs stemming from improvisation. In the past, West and Holmes were the primary writers with additional material originating in jam sessions. For Black Science, all the band members were involved in the composition process from beginning. Thematically, Black Science explores instances in the twentieth century that have led to/or are parallels for contemporary political, social and economic problems. The lyrics on the album were mostly written by West, with the exception of three tracks; one written by songwriter and lyricist Chris Belsito (Airfield On Sunwick (For Wojtek)), one West/Belsito collaboration (Weimar), and one set of lyrics (UXB) written by the band's manager, Eugene Rogers. In addition to the established five-piece line-up, Black Science also sees contributions from saxophonist Josh Norling, guest lead vocals from Jakub Olejnik of Polish band Maze of Sound and background vocals courtesy of Jennifer Gauvreau and Chris Belsito. Black Science was produced and mixed by Craig West, mastered by Will Geraldo and features visual artwork from Monique Holmes.

=== Improv ===
During the recording sessions at Reveal Music which led to the RECORD digital album, the band also captured an additional two hours of improvised instrumentals. It was felt the inclusion of these tracks would offer fans a look at the band's compositional process, underscoring the writing process used for Black Science. The addition of saxophonist Josh Norling on the recordings allowed the group to explore the jazz-fusion genre in addition to their usual sound. It was decided that IMPROV would only be available to those pre-ordering Black Science and that it would not be made available again.

=== Without Further Ado (Live) ===
Machines Dream played live to celebrate the release of Black Science and decided to record their CD Release performance. It was recorded on Sunday July 9, 2017, with live engineering by Dustin Goodall, and was subsequently mixed by Craig West and mastered by Will Geraldo. As with RECORD, it was released on Christmas Day, 2017 for free to fans, and later made available through all streaming service. The title comes from remarks made by Craig West before the band began to play, which can be heard at the beginning of the recording.

Along with the core five-piece band, several tracks on this recording feature Jennifer Gauvreau on backing vocals, who had previously contributed backups to the song Trading Stars For Solitude from the Voices For Hospices CD and Heavy Water from Black Science.

=== Revisionist history ===
With the band's 10th anniversary approaching in December 2018, it was decided that the first two albums, now both out of print, should be remastered and re-released as a deluxe double CD set through Progressive Gears. This would make both albums available in a physical format for a limited time to fans who may not have had a copy of either CD.

Once work began on the project, Craig West insisted that Immunity in particular should be at least partly re-recorded and entirely remixed in order to correct errors in quality that he claimed marred the original album.

To this end, in May 2018 Ken Coulter re-recorded the drums for Immunity following which West re-recorded all the bass on the track as well as some additional guitars and keyboards. The re-recorded Immunity title suite (no longer split into two parts), A Poor Turn For The Soul, Jupiter, A Stone's Throw (from the 100 Afternoons digital EP) and Trading Stars For Solitude (which had appeared on the Voices For Hospices charity CD) were combined with original album tracks Battersea Transcendental, My Ocean Is Electric and Broken Door to create an entirely new version of the Immunity album. According to West, this is the vision of the Immunity album the band had which was not properly realized at the time.

As the Immunity remix was happening, West also decided to remix the first album as well. "Originally the first album was just going to be remastered, but Immunity was sounding really clean and powerful" states West, "and it seemed like if we were going to go through the trouble of digging these albums out for re-release, then they should both be as good as we can possibly get them." The bass guitar on Toronto Skyline was re-recorded during the remixing process due to noise discovered on the original track.

In August 2018, original guitarist Keith Conway visited West in his studio to review the remixes of the first album. This marked his first involvement with the band since 2013. "I had never lost touch with Keith" claims West, "but this was the first time we had sat down together and gone over these songs since they were recorded almost ten years ago. It was a lot of nostalgia and a lot of fun." The booklet for Revisionist History contains a photoshoot from Conway's era that had been intended as part of an insert booklet for the first album, but which was not printed at the time due to financial constraints.

According to Craig West, Revisionist history "... brings us up to date, and helps us both celebrate ten years but also move forward. It's the closing of an era for me, and hearing all these songs cleaned up, properly mixed and mastered, and seeing it all gathered together is liberating. The nagging feeling I've had for years that we could have done better with Immunity is now gone. There's a lot here to be proud of and also a lot to build on."

The Revisionist History package contains remixes of the entire self-titled first album, the Immunity album, the song from Voices For Hospices and the digital EP (100 Afternoons) all remastered and presented in a limited physical edition along with unreleased photographs spanning the first six years of the band's career.

=== Hiatus and lineup changes ===
Following the release of Revisionist History, Machines Dream went on hiatus. Although the group did not disband publicly, internal differences led to the exit of Ken Coulter and Jake Rendell. The remaining members decided to not do or say anything immediately, preferring to focus on writing to determine if they wanted to keep working together as Machines Dream or move on to other projects.

"Revisionist History would have been a pretty good place to stop" stated West, "We had done what we had set out to do, which was to make the kind of music we loved, and ensure that everything we had done was properly mixed, mastered and put out there in the world. If that was our last statement, it would have been a nice bookend."

During the COVID-19 pandemic, the band began working in their home studios and sharing ideas with each other remotely. Concurrently to Holmes, Coleman and West working on demos, West also began writing music with former guitarist Keith Conway. The two separate groups began amassing ideas for songs and creating demos.

In 2020, West read a post on Facebook in a local songwriters group from drummer Phil Greco asking if anyone was looking for drum tracks during the pandemic. West replied and the two began talking. Greco also had a home studio, allowing him to contribute to the band's demo material despite having never met in person. Greco began recording tracks for both Machines Dream and the project with West and Conway.

During a band meeting in 2021, Rob Coleman suggested merging the two projects, providing the band with two lead guitar players. Conway agreed, and the demos were merged into one large batch. Shortly thereafter, West played Rendell some of the tracks that were being developed and Rendell expressed interest in rejoining.

On June 21, 2021, Machines Dream announced their return with a new six-piece version of the band that would feature West, Holmes, Coleman, Rendell, Conway and Greco. The band announced they would be releasing and EP before the end of 2021, with a full album to follow early in 2022.

== Influences ==
As a whole, Machines Dream sees the band as influenced by classic, neo-progressive and third wave prog. Individually, the members of Machines Dream each have specific influences. When the band began jamming they had no set mandate to create progressive music, but when they listened back to their jams, they discovered their natural sound would best be categorized as prog rock. Individually, Craig West cites Pink Floyd, Marillion, Porcupine Tree and Rush as key influences on his work with Machines Dream, along with The Who's Quadrophenia album, and the DIY ethos of Hüsker Dü; Rob Coleman's cites Yngwie Malmsteen, Greg Howe, and Pat Metheny; Jake Rendell has a Bachelor's Degree in Music, specifically voice and his influences include the classical and vocal music he studied in school as well as 90's alternative rock, Motown and traditional blues; Ken cites Big Big Train and Porcupine Tree as contemporary influences along with Pearl Jam, Electric Light Orchestra, Soundgarden, Led Zeppelin, The Who and Radiohead; Brian started as a classical musician before working in heavy metal and progressive rock and cites Devin Townsend, Anathema, Bach and Behemoth amongst his many influences.

== Characteristics ==
Machines Dream's sound has been described as neo-progressive, cinematic, and radio host Guy Bellamy recently dubbed their sound as "widescreen". They fall into the more accessible and song-oriented stream of progressive rock such as Pink Floyd, Genesis, Marillion, Spock's Beard, Porcupine Tree and Riverside as opposed to more experimental or technical groups including King Crimson, Van Der Graff Generator, Dream Theater and Yes. Technique is subservient to songwriting, and even during more adventurous instrumental passages, the groups' two primary soloists, Holmes and Coleman, favour melody over virtuosity. West has stated on several occasions that he is critical of the lyrics in much of the genre as being too fanciful and claimed that the band's goal is to balance the atmosphere that progressive rock creates with lyrics that have a harder subject matter such as mental illness, politics, and media.

== Discography ==
Machines Dream (2012)

1. Boundaries (West)
2. Toronto Skyline (West)
3. London By Night (West)
4. Unarmed at Sea (Coulter, Holmes, Pierucci, West, Wigglesworth, lyrics: Chris Belsito)
5. Mad For All Seasons (Coulter, Holmes, Pierucci, West, Wigglesworth)
6. Stop Waiting for Miracles (West)
7. Locusts (West)
8. Colder Rain (Coulter, Holmes, Pierucci, West, Wigglesworth, lyrics: West, Belsito)
9. Everyone Says Goodbye (West, Conway)
10. The Session (West, Wigglesworth, Conway, lyrics: West, Belsito)
- Craig West - Guitars, Bass, Lead Vocals, Synth Pads, Backing Vocals
- Brian Holmes - Piano and Synths, Bass
- Ken Coulter - Drums
- Keith Conway - Lead Guitar
- Lyrics by Craig West except where noted
- Recorded at Bear Dog Digital
- Produced by Craig West

Additional Musicians:

- Backing Vocals - Jake Rendell (Everyone Says Goodbye, Toronto Skyline, Stop Waiting for Miracles, Locusts, London by Night)
- Drums - Ed Young (The Session)

Immunity (2014)

1. Immunity Part 1 (Holmes, West, lyrics: West, Belsito)
2. Battersea Transcendental (West)
3. Broken Door (Coulter, Holmes, Pierucci, West, Wigglesworth)
4. My Ocean is Electric (Coulter, Holmes, Pierucci, West, Wigglesworth)
5. Immunity Part 2 (Holmes, West, Coulter, Pierucci, Wigglesworth, lyrics: West, Belsito)
- Craig West - Guitars, Bass, Lead Vocals
- Brian Holmes - Piano and Synths, Bass
- Ken Coulter - Drums
- Rob Coleman - Lead Guitar
- Jake Rendell - Backing Vocals
- Lyrics by Craig West except where noted
- Recorded at Bear Dog Digital & Cases Music
- Produced by Craig West

Additional Musicians:

- Saxophone - Josh Norling (Immunity Part 1,2)

100 Afternoons Bonus EP (2014)

1. A Poor Turn for the Soul (West)
2. A Stone's Throw (West)
3. Jupiter (West)
4. Keep Your Head Down (Coulter, Holmes, Pierucci, West, Wigglesworth)
5. Trading Stars for Solitude (Coulter, Holmes, Pierucci, West, Wigglesworth)
- Craig West - Guitars, Bass, Lead Vocals
- Brian Holmes - Piano and Synths
- Ken Coulter - Drums
- Rob Coleman - Lead Guitar
- Jake Rendell - Backing Vocals
- Lyrics by Craig West
- Recorded at Bear Dog Digital & Cases Music
- Produced by Craig west

Record (2016)

1. The Cannons Cry
2. Toronto Skyline
3. Jupiter
4. Mad for All Seasons
5. My Ocean is Acoustic
6. Unarmed at Sea
7. Black Science
- All songs performed by Machines Dream and Josh Norling

Black Science (2017)

1. Armistice Day (West)
2. Weimar (Coulter, Holmes, Coleman, West, Rendell, lyrics: West/Belsito )
3. The Cannons Cry (Coulter, Holmes, Coleman, West, Rendell)
4. Heavy Water (Coulter, Holmes, Coleman, West, Rendell)
5. Airfield on Sunwick (for Wotjek) (Coulter, Holmes, Coleman, West, Rendell, lyrics: Belsito)
6. Black Science (Coulter, Holmes, Coleman, West, Rendell)
7. UXB (Coulter, Holmes, Coleman, West, Rendell, lyrics: Rogers)
8. Noise to Signal (Coulter, Holmes, Coleman, West, Rendell)
- Craig West - Bass, Lead Vocals
- Brian Holmes - Piano and Synths
- Ken Coulter - Drums
- Rob Coleman - Electric Guitar
- Jake Rendell - Acoustic Guitar, Backing Vocals
- Lyrics by Craig West except where noted
- Recorded at Bear Dog Digital, Cases Music & Village Electric
- Produced by Craig west

Without Further Ado - Live (2018)

1. Weimar
2. The Cannons Cry
3. Toronto Skyline
4. My Ocean is Electric
5. Heavy Water
6. Battersea Transcendental
7. Mad for All Seasons
8. Noise to Signal
- All songs performed by Machines Dream, Jennifer Gauvreau

Revisionist History (2019)

- Disc 1
1. Immunity
2. Trading Stars for Solitude
3. Broken Door
4. My Ocean is Electric
5. A Poor Turn for the Soul
6. Jupiter
7. Battersea Transcendental
8. A Stones Throw
- Disc 2
1. Boundaries
2. Toronto Skyline
3. London by Night
4. Unarmed at Sea
5. Mad for All Seasons
6. Stop Waiting for Miracles
7. Locusts
8. Colder Rain
9. Everyone Says Goodbye
10. The Session
- All music remaster by Craig West
- Performance credit for all tracks is exact as stated above for individual songs/albums
