= Dance Concept =

- Founded: 2003
- Founder: Benny_V
- Genre: Drum and bass
- Country of origin: United Kingdom
- Location: London
- Official website: www.danceconcept.com

Dance Concept

Dance Concept is a British drum and bass promotion and independent record label. Dance Concept has been running since 1999 promoting parties all over the UK as well as releasing music on all formats on the record label.

It started back in 1999 as a London drum & bass promoter.

== 2003 to date ==
In 2003, the label arm of the promotion took off releasing, first a teaser single and then worldwide distributed album, The Legend featuring Stevie Hyper D. Tracks from the album gained massive exposure being played on UK National Radio stations such as KISS FM and BBC Radio One as well as gaining cult support and airplay on the underground pirate stations. "Buffalo Soldier" from the album was nominated for DNBA tune of the year in 2004. Although originally released on double CD and 4-piece vinyl, the album was later also released online as the digital revolution took over. The label continued with sporadic singles being released over the resulting years with notable releases such as Benny_V and Dfrnt Lvls' "Oldskool Box", followed by the Modified Motion remix of the same track and Sub Zero’s remix of "Trick of Technology".

In 2008 and 2009, Dance Concept set off on a series of Label Tours predominantly at The Rhythm Factory in London's East End, showcasing releases on the label by many of the artists.

In 2012, Dance Concept hosted the sellout Stevie Hyper Tribute, "Generation Hyper" in London.

== Label artists ==
Dance Concept has been home to a range of artists including:

- Aphrodite (Artist)
- Benny_V
- Bladerunner
- Brockie / Undiluted
- Child Support
- Dfrnt Lvls
- Fresh Kutt / DJ Magic
- K-Warren
- Kenny Ken
- Modified Motion
- Stevie Hyper D
- Sub Zero
- Serum
- Voltage

== Discography ==
=== Albums ===
- The Legend DCCD001 / DCLP001 (2004) - CD/vinyl
- Generation Hyper DCCDGH01 / DCGHLP01 (2014) - CD/vinyl

=== Singles ===
- DC001 "All I Wanna Do / Move Your Body" (2003)
- DC002 "Oldskool Box / Chained Reaction" (2005)
- DC003 "Flexin Today / Junglist Soldier" (2006)
- DC004 "End Game / Catch Ya" (2006)
- DC005 "Buffalo Soldier / Aint No Stoppin Us now" (2007)
- DC006 "Trick of Technology / Remix Part 1" (2007)
- DC007 "Oldskool Box Remix's" (2009)
- DC008 "Trick of Technology Remix's" (2010)
- DC009 "Delikutt Beats 2014" (2014)
- DC010 "Born to Do It" (2014)
- DC011 "Oldskool Box Reopened" (2015)
- DC012 "End Game Remixes" (2015)
- DC013 "FEEL / So Damn Tuff" (2015)
- DC014 "Save Me" (2015)
- DC015 "Here We Are" (2015)
- DC016 "Born to Do It Remixes" (2017)
- DC017 "No Love / Dead" (2017)
- DC018 "Cyclonic / We Got the Beat" (2017)
- DC019 "BBB / Success" (2017)
- DC020 "Jealous / In the Trap" (2017)
- DC021 "No Evil / Alien Embryo" (2017)
- DC022 "Drunken Style / The Payback" (2018)
- DC023 Feel the Fire EP (2018)
- DC024 "Double Take / Gamma Groove" (2018)
- DC025 "Wet Work / Are You Mad" (2018)
- DC026 Nice Guy EP (2018)
- DC027 Transform EP (2018)
- DC028 Hustlers Delight EP (2018)
