= Street Soul Productions =

- Founded: 2005
- Genre: Hip Hop
- Country of origin: United States
- Location: Birmingham, London, Ipswich, California, United Kingdom, United States
- Official website: www.streetsoulproductions.wordpress.com

Street Soul Productions (S.S.P) Is a record label established in 2005. Originally based in Birmingham, London, Ipswich and California the label became a community organization in 2008, and since then has concentrated on music workshops and events alongside online broadcasting. The label is called Street Soul to pay tribute to the hip hop genre, in particular the Jazzmatazz movement from the mid-1990s.

Created by James Kennaby, aka Vice in 2005, Street Soul Productions is aimed at an Alternative UK Hip Hop. Created in Birmingham, UK involve artists from around the World, embracing a wide range of different styles, and incorporating emcees, singers, DJs, Producers and session musicians to consistently create a unique brand of Hip Hop for the future.

== History ==
=== 2002 ===
Vice, Halo and Venom began studying at the University of Lincoln. In the same year Halo formed a trio called The Micrippers. The group consisted of Halo, JD Sykex and Geo-Graphic. Within a few months the group began performing at various student nights and live events around the region and began to build a strong following. Venom was invited to DJ for the group and incorporated the performers into his existing Live shows. Alongside being a DJ, Venom was also an event promoter and radio show host and managed to build the Micrippers fan base.

=== 2003 ===
The following year the group began recording their debut project entitled The Four Chapters. At this point additional members began building around the core Micrippers team. The new members included Emcees Stevie Beko and Vice. The newly formed collective quickly established their roles, with Halo and Vice engineering the music, Geo-graphic concentrating on the production and Venom, JD Sykex and Stevie Beko concentrating on promotion.

The project sold out within the first few weeks, and from there the music became stronger. Incorporating various session musicians from Beatboxers to singers, guitarists to DJ's, the sound evolved alongside the overall professionalism of the Micrippers approach.

=== 2004 ===
During the final year of University, The Micrippers released their second project entitled The Lost Chapters. The project was used as a promotional tool, and more importantly a way to connect with new musicians and extend the artists' existing network.

=== 2005 ===
After graduating from Lincoln University the group stayed in touch, and in September 2005 Vice approached Halo and Venom to become members of the newly formed Street Soul Productions record label. During this time James Kennaby (Vice) had started work on the label's debut project entitled The Tales Of A Street Poet. Enlisting the help of a variety of producers including Rise (Futuristica) and Arcaine (Hedphokis) alongside Emcee Solo Cypher of the Birmingham-based Vocal Swords collective. By the end of the year 1000 copies of the project had been pressed on to CD and the trio began to distribute the project around the country.

=== 2006 ===
The label decided to expand, with the addition of formed Micrippers member JD Sykex and Birmingham based REP.

Also in 2006, Venom started work on Your's Sincerely mixtape.

=== 2007 ===
In 2007 the label started facilitating music workshops. Concentrating on lyric writing, emceeing, DJing and music production, the Street Soul Productions team are attempting to spread positive messages to a wide variety of schools, community projects and youth centres around the UK. During this year Halo started work on Halogenic, with the intention of creating a project that blends a variety of different styles and sounds to illustrate his skills as an Emcee. Around the same time Vice started work on con-X-ions after a successful internet based collaboration with Canadian Emcees Wio-K and Dan-e-o, and Australian Emcee Eljay. As part of the con-X-ions Vice connected with Rawkus Records / Glow In The Dark Panacea. The group later went on to be named Number 1 Hip Hop album of 2007 in Hip Hop Connection magazine, a UK-based magazine which was established in the early 1990s. The track Vice and Panacea created is entitled Momentary Emotions.

=== 2008 ===
2008 saw the label go from strength to strength, with interest from BBC 1Xtra, Big Smoke Magazine and This Is Hip Hop (Blog). In the same year the team began promoting forthcoming projects. d. C. and Vice began a collaborative project entitled "The Transatlantic Connection". One track from the LP saw particular success. "Searching" was chosen to be part of a charity compilation by development charity Kamay a Puso which was distributed nationally across America in October 2008. In January 2008 Vice, Venom, Halo and REP were invited to appear on the long running pirate radio station Force FM for the DJ Shorty Show. The show wasn't recorded, and consequently a 20-minute podcast was created by Street Soul Productions as an alternative download for listeners. Also during 2008 California based d. C. officially joined the Street Soul team as an official producer. Like with all the Street Soul artists d. C. continues to work with non-Street Soul members, and already has worked with New York-based rapper Fokis (Aftermath Entertainment), Wu Tang International member Darkim Be Allah (see List of Wu-Tang Clan affiliates), Lauren Santiago and many more. d. C. has contributed to a number of Street Soul projects including Vice's con-X-ions, Venom's Northern Soul, REP's Distant Traveller and Halo's For The Love Of The Music.

=== 2009 ===
By 2009 Street Soul Productions were becoming established within the UK Hip Hop community, and created a podcast called Basement Sessions to further promote the artists. Working with both up and coming and established musicians, DJs and promoters, the podcast built up a rapid fanbase via various social networking websites and blogs including Facebook, Blogger (Google) and MySpace. The label are strongly connected with the local music scene on a grassroots level. Not only concentrating on the music, the label also works with talented artists including photographer Karl R Dixon, illustrator Gemma Lewis, caricature artist Matt Brown aka Stilts, graphic designers Simon Randall and Hon To and many more talented individuals who create their work with a social conscience. In late January 2009, Vice and Venom, the co-creators of Street Soul Productions launched the Basement Sessions Podcasts. Utilising the Podomatic website, the podcasts were intended to promote new music from the Street Soul Productions musicians, however the podcasts rapidly expanded and Vice quickly became established as an interviewer and podcast host. In May 2009, Sensei FM, a London-based online radio station added Basement Sessions to its range of shows, giving Basement Sessions increased credibility and a larger audience. By June 2009, 500+ people had subscribed to the show using iTunes. In late 2009 the Street Soul Productions team began working on an event called the XLR Festival at Knowle West Media Centre in Bristol, UK after the very successful Basement Sessions Live event at Space 2 in Birmingham, which was granted funding from the Arts Council under the Grants For The Arts scheme.

=== 2010 ===
In collaboration with The Hip Hop Lounge promoter, producer and DJ Jagos aka Joss Holmes, Vice ran the first XLR Festival. With a host of top notch local performances, film showcases and talks, the festival gained local attention from residents and the press alike. Aimed at 10- to 19-year-olds, the daytime workshops, supported by sensei.fm, covered a wide range of musical areas.

== Artists ==
Current

- The Delegates Of Rhyme - Bristol and London, UK
- Vice beats (formerly Vice) - Producer - Bristol, UK
- Donnie Numeric - London, UK
- Kinnie Daley - Birmingham, UK
- Genius Collective - Birmingham, UK

Former -

- d. C. - Producer - California, US
- Halo - Emcee - Ipswich, UK
- REP - Emcee - Birmingham, UK
- Venom - Emcee / DJ - London, UK

Associates

- Remedy - Emcee - Ipswich, UK
- JD Sykex - Emcee - London, UK
- Ascend - Producer - Ipswich, UK
- Carvalho - Vocalist, Bassist & Flute Player - Birmingham, UK

== Discography ==
Studio albums

- 2005: Vice - "The Tales Of A Street Poet"
- 2006: d. C. - "Separation Anxiety" (Released on soulplusmind music)
- 2007: d. C. - "Cut 'N' Sewn" (Released on soulplusmind music)
- 2008: Venom - "Your's Sincerely Mixtape"
- 2009: d. C. - Darkim Be Allah - "God In The Ghetto Mixtape" (Co-produced by d. C.) (Released on Fame Labs Music)
- 2009: Halo - "Halogenic" - Date TBC
- 2009: Vice - "con-X-ions" - Date TBC
- 2009: REP - "The Distant Traveller" - Date TBC
- 2009: Venom - "Northern Soul" - Date TBC
- 2009: Halo - "For The Love Of The Music" - Date TBC
- 2009: Vice & d. C. - "The Transatlantic Connection" - Date TBC (To be Released on Street Soul / soulplusmind music)
