= Outta Sight Records =

British record label

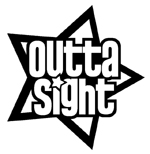
- Founded: 2007
- Distributors: Passion Music, Essential Music & Marketing
- Genre: Northern Soul; Rare Soul; Modern Soul
- Country of origin: UK
- Location: Midlands
- Official website: www.outtasight.co.uk

Outta Sight Records, also known as Outta Sight Soul Essentials, was formed in the UK in December 2006, as part of the Castle Music family of imprints within the Sanctuary Records Group. It was conceived as a vehicle to reissue the soul catalogue owned by the group. The catalogue included the Pye and Piccadilly/Dawn UK labels plus De-Lite, Sugarhill, Chelsea, Perception, Today, Maple and associated subsidiaries. In late 2007 Sanctuary was acquired by the Universal Music Group (UMG). Outta Sight reverted to being an independent label and was relaunched in February 2010. The label, based in Warwickshire, England is distributed in the UK by Passion Music Limited and Essential Music & Marketing.

Outta Sight specializes in Northern soul and Rare soul music and as at 2010 is the only UK record label to release previously unissued material by Detroit girl group The Heartstoppers, Susan Phillips, Innervision and Michael Valvano. The label is distributed around the world finding particular favour in the US and Japan.

Outta Sight is a featured label on the BBC 6 Music Craig Charles Funk and Soul Show and the BBC Radio 2 Mark Lamarr Show.

In October 2010 Outta Sight published the book The Northern Soul Years 1973-81 written by Northern Soul authority Tim Brown. The book accurately recounts, for the first time, the significant records played at the Wigan Casino during its 8-year reign over the UK Northern Soul scene. This important document is the result of extensive research, much of it at the British Library, and personal recollections.

== Outta Sight Castle Music ==
- All Platinum Girls
- The Kaygees – Master Plan
- East Coast Soul Selection
- Tears Full of Soul
- Black Gold – Sought After Soul
- Frankie Crocker – Do It Frankie, Do It To It!
- Soul Twins Vol 1 – JJ Barnes/Debbie Taylor
- Soul Twins Vol 2 – Gloria Barnes/Chosen Few
- The Rhythm Makers – Soul on Your Side
- The Real Thing – Singles Collection

== Outta Sight Independent ==
- Groovesville USA
- The Sound of Sidra
- Michael Valvano's Contours – I'm A Winner
- Dial 3 For Northern Soul
- Innervision – We're Innervision
- Diggin' For Soul
- Say Hi To Northern Soul
- Detroit's Golden Soul
- Soul Twins – The Heartstoppers/Susan Phillips

== Keep on Burning ==
Outta Sight Records were the company behind the Northern soul documentary Keep on Burning. Directed by Alan Byron, the documentary featured Marc Almond, Tony Blackburn, Ian Levine, Tony Palmer and many other key DJs and people from the dancefloors of the Wigan Casino and Blackpool Mecca. When the documentary was repeated on Talking Pictures TV in 2021, they described it as "a look at the world's most enduring underground music movement".

== See also ==
- Soul music
- Lists of record labels
