= Temple Records =

Temple Records may refer to:

- Temple Records (1978 UK label), a record label started by Robin Morton
- Temple US Records
