= Jazztronik =

Japanese DJ, record producer and jazz musician

- Origin: Japan
- Genres: Jazz, house, downtempo, lounge, jazz rap
- Years active: 1998–present
- Labels: Flower Records (independent label, 1998–2003); Tokuma Japan Communications (2003–2006); Sony Music Japan; Knife Edge (2006–); HATS (?–?); Shichigosan Records (?–present)
- Website: jazztronik.com

Jazztronik is a Japanese music group formed by the Tokyo-based DJ/producer/pianist Ryota Nozaki; it is a solo project and does not have fixed members. Jazztronik released two albums and two EPs since 1998 on label Flower Records. In 2001, Jazztronik also released the album Inner Flight on Counterpoint, a UK label. In 2021, Jazztronik released Universal Language on Shichigosan Records.

Jazztronik has been growing in popularity and has hit sales of 100,000+. Jazztronik performs to sold-out crowds all across the Japanese club scene, and its growth in America and Europe has helped him reach popularity in the English club scene.

== See also ==
- Japanese jazz
