= Kaycee Records =

- Country of origin: United Kingdom

Kaycee Records is an independent record label established in the United Kingdom, jointly owned and managed by the founders Kennedy Kesidi Richard from Oguta, Nigeria, and Kingsley Chibuzor Aguoru from Orlu, who are the chief executive officers.

Among the popular artists on the Kaycee Records label is Safin De Coque, the son of the Highlife's Oliver De Coque, who was introduced into the Nigerian music industry during a press conference hosted by Kaycee Records in March 2011.

Kaycee Records in 2012, sign up Mr. Bistop (Amaobi Clement) a former member of the brackets. and recently released his single titled Payapaya.

== Objectives ==
Kaycee Records has been promoting Nigerian acts in the UK since around 1995.

In late 2010 Kaycee Records expanded to Nigeria and the record label was launched at The Coliseum Niteshift, Ikeja, Lagos. During the launch, the company presented Nigerian artistes on the label including Uche Barry Nwobi (Swith Barry), Ikechukwu Iroegbu (Snappy), Meldaline Maureen Uzoigwe (Mel-Dee), Chike Ken Nwoke (Seaflo), and the group Southend.

The President of Kaycee Records Kennedy Richard says their aim is to promote talented young artists who are short of money.

And to remix their music to suit musical tastes in Europe and North America.

Kaycee Records had already signed six Nigerian acts, during the unveiling of the record label in Nigeria.

According to Kennedy Richard, Kaycee Records has the technology to prevent the artists work being pirated.

Musical styles will include Highlife, Bongo, Hip Hop, Fuji and Akpala.

== Released albums ==
Albums released, according to the company website, are:

Artiste	Album	Year
Amaobi Clement (a.k.a. Mr. Bistop)	Payapaya	2012
Swith Barry	Resurrection	2011
Snappy	On your Radio	2011
Safin De Coque	Inherited Gift	2011
