= Self-Portrait with Death Playing the Fiddle =

Painting by Arnold Böcklin

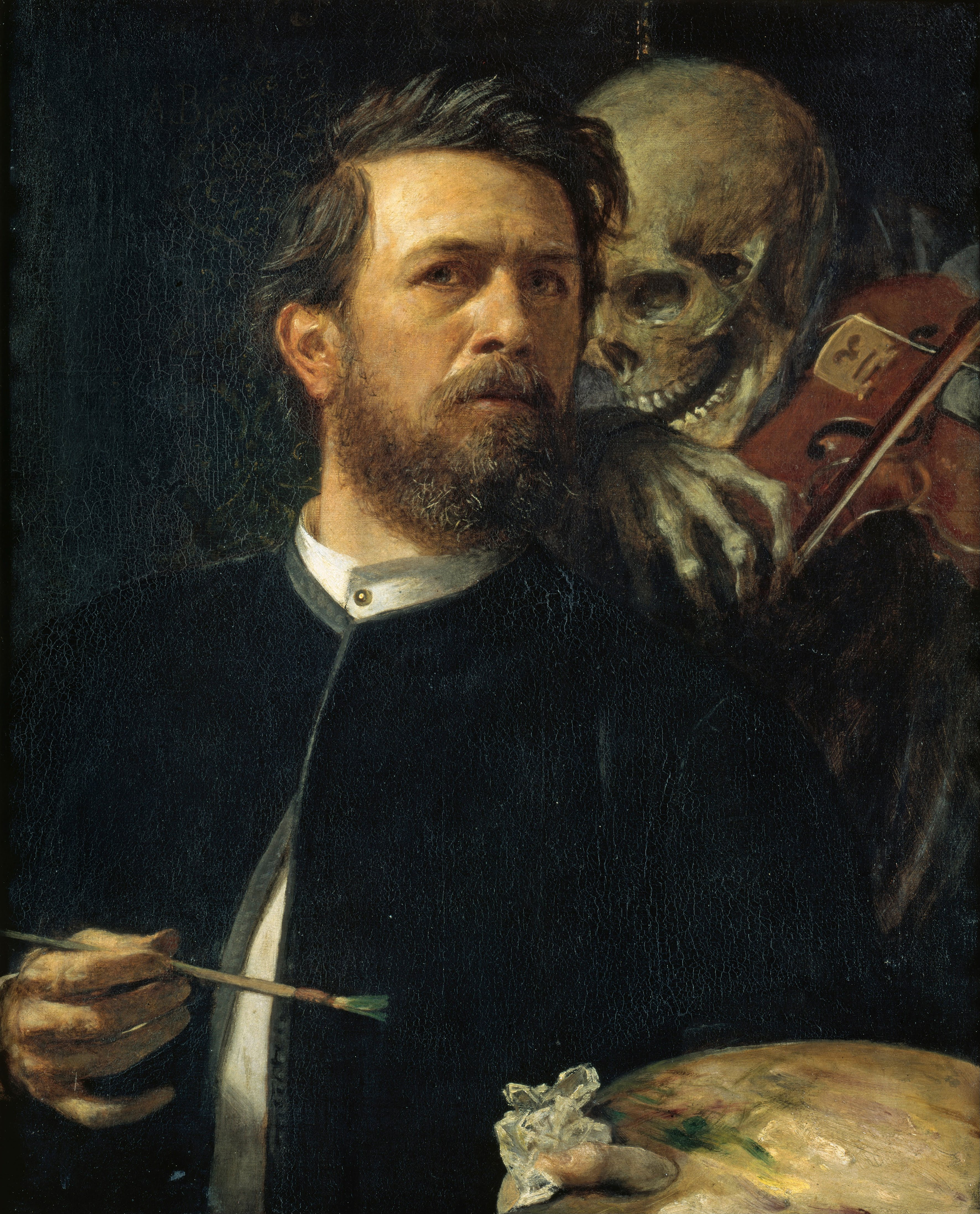
- Year: 1872
- Medium: oil on canvas
- Dimensions: 75 cm × 61 cm (30 in × 24 in)
- Location: Alte Nationalgalerie, Berlin

Self-Portrait with Death Playing the Fiddle is a painted self-portrait executed in 1872 by the Swiss symbolist artist Arnold Böcklin. He first exhibited at the Kunstverein München in the same year, establishing his reputation in Munich's artistic community. It is now in the Alte Nationalgalerie, in Berlin.

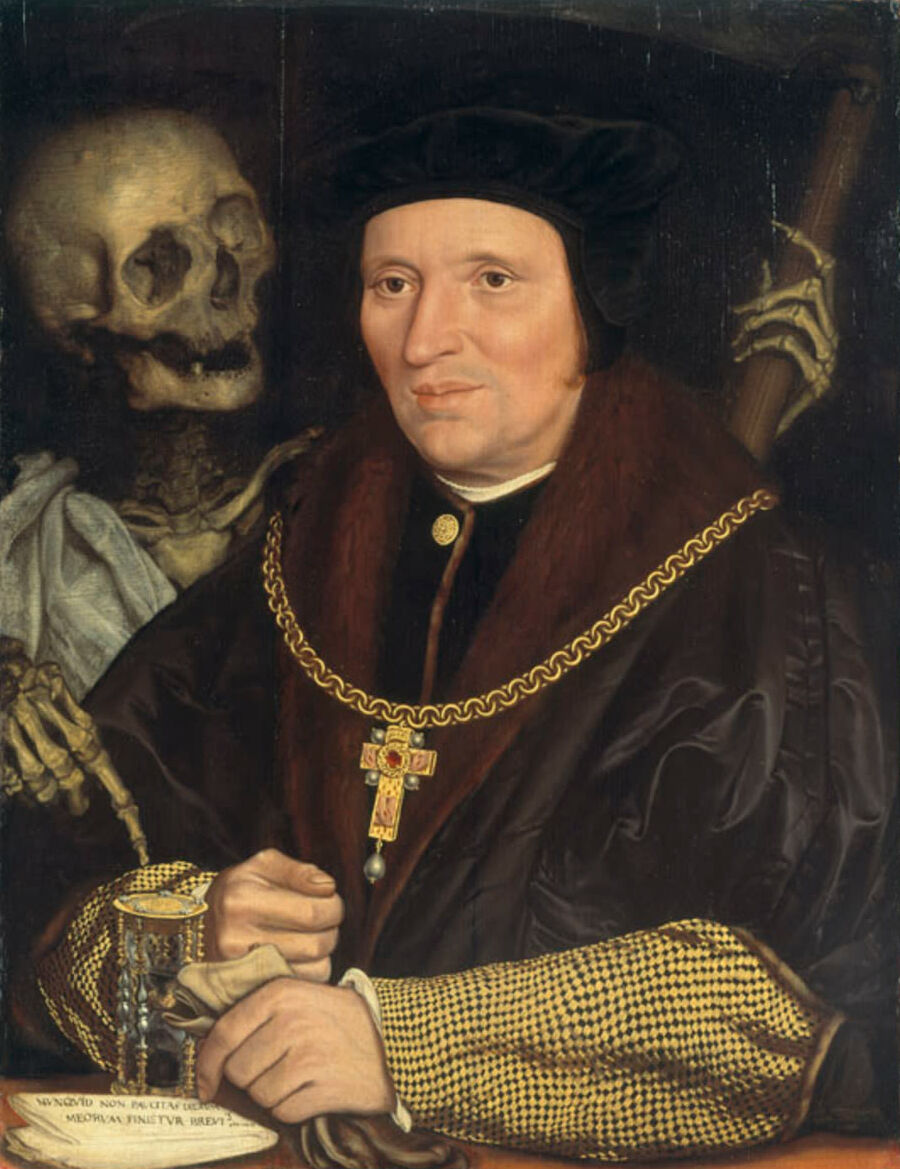
Sir Brian Tuke, c.1540, anonymous after Hans Holbein the Younger

Painted in Munich, the painting depicts a bearded Böcklin stalked by a personification of death playing a single-stringed violin in an intimation of his mortality. It is an echo of an earlier painting of Sir Brian Tuke by an anonymous painter c.1540, part of the collection of the Alte Pinakothek in Munich, in which the shadowing figure of Death is pointing at an hourglass.

Death and mortality is a repeating theme in several of Böcklin's works, including Plague, two versions of War, and five versions of Isle of the Dead.

According to Alma Mahler, the wife of the composer Gustav Mahler, her husband was "under the spell" of Böcklin's self-portrait when writing the scherzo movement of his Fourth Symphony.

== See also ==
- List of paintings by Arnold Böcklin
