= Croatian music festivals =

Series of Croatian music festivals

The Croatian music festivals are a series of music festivals which showcase the top Croatian musical acts, in both traditional and contemporary music. They usually involve live performances as well as awards given by festival jurors as well as from the fans. The majority of the festivals release a compilation of the songs entered.

== Pop festivals ==
- Dora
  - This is the festival which selects Croatia's representative at the Eurovision Song Contest. It is organized by Croatian Radiotelevision.
- Croatian Radio Festival
  - A popular festival which receives coverage on Croatian radio, as it organized by the Croatian Association of Radio and News. Listeners are encouraged to call in to vote for their favourite songs. Unlike other festivals, the Croatian Radio Festival has no permanent home and moves host cities each year.
- Split Festival
  - Begun in 1960, the Split Music Festival is one of the oldest in Croatia. It has a heavy emphasis on the music of Dalmatia.
- Zagrebfest
  - The oldest Croatian music festival, Zagrebfest is oriented towards urban chansons and schlagers. It has suffered in recent years as many of the top Croatian pop acts have been from Dalmatia.
- Zadarfest
  - A pop music festival held in the coastal city of Zadar.
- Dalmatian Chanson Evenings
  - Held annually in Šibenik, this festival focusses on the chansons of the Dalmatian region.
- Melodije Mostara
  - Held in Mostar, Bosnia and Herzegovina, this festival primarily draws Croatian singers. It is organized by the city of Mostar and sponsored by Aluminij, the largest Bosnian Croat firm.
- Etnofest Neum
  - Another festival based in Bosnia and Herzegovina, this one takes place in the coastal city of Neum. Unlike in Mostar, Etnofest only features Croatian music and focusses on music with a folk sound.
- Marco Polo Fest
  - A somewhat smaller pop festival held on the island of Korčula.
- Melodije Istre i Kvarnera
  - A festival held in several towns in Istria and Kvarner which focusses mostly on the regional music.

== Folk festivals ==
- Festival kajkavske popevke
  - Held annually in Krapina since 1966, this festival features original songs inspired by the traditional folk music of Hrvatsko Zagorje, and sung in the Kajkavian dialect.
- Zlatne žice Slavonije
  - A festival of both tambura and pop music held annually in Požega in late August or early September.

== Rock festivals ==
- Urban Fest Osijek
  - Features less traditional Croatian music such as hard rock, alternative rock and electronica. It is held in Osijek.
- Hartera
  - Festival is held in Rijeka, in former paper factory halls. First festival was held in 2005. and there were two stages - one for rock/alternative and one for electro music. In 2007. it was divided in two days.

== Electronic festivals ==
- Love international festival
  - Festival is held in Tisno.
- Hospitality On The Beach
  - Festival is held in Tisno.
- SuncéBeat 9
  - Festival is held in Tisno.
- Soundwave Festival Croatia
  - Festival is held in Tisno.
- Defected Croatia 2018
  - Festival is held in Tisno.
- Dekmantel Selectors
  - Festival is held in Tisno.
- Seasplash Festival
  - Festival is held in Pula.
- Outlook Festival
  - Festival is held in Pula.
- Dimensions Festival
  - Festival is held in Pula.
- Unknown Festival
  - Festival is held near Rovinj.

== Classical ==
- Music Biennale Zagreb
  - An international festival of contemporary classical music
- Dubrovačke ljetne igre
- Musical Evenings in St. Donatus
  - A classical music festival which takes place in Zadar.
- Varaždin Baroque Evenings
  - A festival of baroque music in the baroque city of Varaždin.
- Osor Musical Evenings
  - A classical music festival which takes place in Osor on the island of Cres.

== English ==
- Radar Festival
  - A summer music festival featuring foreign rock bands.

== See also ==
- Music of Croatia
- croatiafestivals.co.uk
