= Musical Evenings at St Donatus =

Musical evenings at St. Donatus (Croatian: Glazbene večeri u Sv. Donatu) in Zadar, Croatia is an international classical music festival held since 1961 at Church of St Donatus and at other historical locations of the city of Zadar. Besides concerts of various orchestras and soloists, it also hosts exhibitions and workshops, all connected by annual theme.

Festival was initiated by Zadar's conductor Pavle Dešpalj, who was also its first artistic director.

During the first festival summers the aim was to bring to Zadar prominent performing artists from all over the world as well as Croatia but also to strengthen local performing forces, allowing them to equally participate in the programme. Owing to the Croatian War of Independence, the Evenings were not held during 1991–1993. Festival became among the most popular classical music festivals in Adriatic Croatia (together with Osor Musical Evenings and Organ Summer School in Šibenik).

66th edition (5 July–6 August 2026) has a theme "planets", with concerts by the Symphony and Tambura Orchestra and Choir of the Croatian Radiotelevision (The Planets by Gustav Holst, Star Wars by John Williams), Zagreb Soloists, Zadar Chamber Orchestra (Mahler's 4th Symphony), several Croatian classical musicians, French ensemble Into the Winds, Dutch vocal group Cappelle Pratensis, projects "Komad neba" by Mangroove and "Drugo sunce" by Maja Rivić Quintet, workshops and exhibition.
