= Jackmaster =

Scottish DJ and record producer (1986–2024)

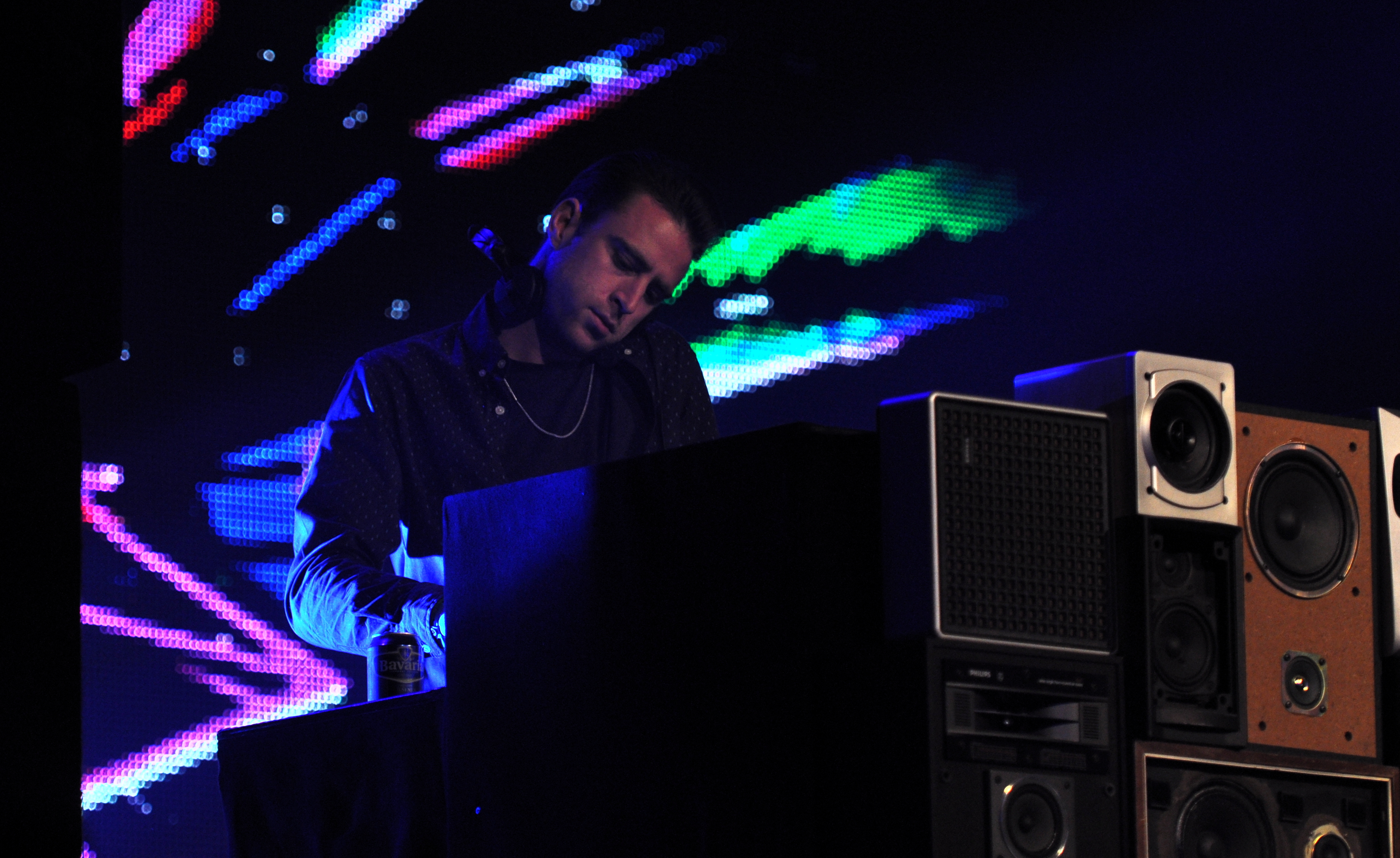
- Jackmaster in 2013

Background information
- Born: Jack Revill; 11 January 1986; Glasgow, Scotland
- Died: 12 October 2024 (aged 38) Ibiza, Spain
- Genres: House, tech house, deep house, techno, bass, ghetto house, garage
- Occupation: Disc jockey
- Years active: 2007–2024

Jack Revill (11 January 1986 – 12 October 2024), better known as Jackmaster, was a Scottish DJ and record producer. He co-founded the Glasgow-based record label and club night Numbers as well as Wireblock, Dress 2 Sweat, Point.One Recordings, Seldom Felt and TDSR.

Revill was known for his in-depth and diverse music taste and ability to mix a multitude of different genres. Although he did work as a producer, he was primarily known for his work as a DJ, similarly to Hessle Audio's Ben UFO and Rinse FM's Oneman.

== Career ==
Revill was taught to DJ by his best friend Calum Morton (a.k.a. Spencer) at the age of 13 and spent much of his teenage years DJing in bars and clubs around Glasgow – by the time Revill was 17 he was a resident at Glasgow techno institution Monox and promoting his own club-nights alongside Spencer.

He began working at the prominent record shop Rubadub in Glasgow at the age of 14 where, rather than asking for money, he was paid one record per hour's work, though – after leaving school at 16 – he began working full time at Rubadub distribution. It was while working at the shop that Revill was given the nickname Jackmaster in reference to the popular term "Jackmaster" coined in the Chicago house music scene in the late 80s.

Revill adopted the alias Jackmaster as his DJ moniker in slots on local radio station Radio Magnetic with early mentor Claude Young from Detroit. At the time he had no DJ name and asked to use his birth name, but Claude and Spencer advised he used the name Jackmaster and it stuck.

Revill was awarded 'Breakthrough DJ' at DJ Magazine's Best of British Awards in 2010.

In 2011 after his Numbers label hosted a series of parties at Fabric nightclub in London, Revill was asked by the London clubbing institution to mix and curate the FabricLive.57 album. The mix was received with critical acclaim receiving 4.5 out of 5 on Resident Advisor.

Revill played at a number of clubbing institutions such as Fabric, Circo Loco at DC10, The Warehouse Project, Output, Berghain, Trouw and Sub Club, as well as festivals such as Glastonbury, Unknown, Lost Village, Dekmantel, Bestival, T in the Park and Dimensions Festival.

He curated a diverse lineup of acts that included Moodymann, Joy Orbison, Tale of Us, Dance Mania and DJ Slimzee.

In December 2014, Revill was voted 'Best DJ' in the DJ Magazine Best of British Awards as well as coming 11th in Resident Advisor's prestigious 'Top 100 DJs of 2014' poll, a poll where he came 5th and 2nd in the following years. He also embarked upon a highly prestigious residency slot on BBC Radio 1 in August of the same year, joining other DJs such as Grimes, James Blake and Bonobo.

In November 2016, Revill was awarded the SSE company's Scottish Music Awards Sub Club Electronic Music Award, making him the first winner of the new category within the Scottish Music Awards. His win came as part of an event organised to raise funds for Scotland's only music therapy charity, Nordoff-Robbins.

In April 2017, Revill was awarded the Tennents Golden Can Award for Contributions to Scottish Culture, placing him beside notable Scots such as author Irvine Welsh and footballer Andrew Robertson.

== Record labels ==
Revill set up a number of record labels; the first of which, Point.One Recordings, was an electro label set up in 2006 with the intention to release the first works by Warp Records recording artist Rustie under the Voltaic alias. Following this, Revill founded Dress 2 Sweat in 2007, a vinyl label that focused predominantly on Baltimore club music emerging from the United States.

A year later, Revill and good friend Calum Morton, along with Morton's brother Neil, formed Wireblock records which saw releases from Hudson Mohawke and Rustie in the early stages of their career before they signed to Warp Records, as well as personal heroes such a Rome's Lory D.

=== Numbers ===
The Numbers record label was formed in 2010 with the combining of the three labels, Wireblock, Dress 2 Sweat and Stuffrecords. Wireblock being run by Revill and brothers Calum and Neil Morton; Dress 2 Sweat run by Jack Revill alone; and Stuffrecords by Richard Chater. The first release by Numbers was "If U Want Me" by Deadboy, and it has since released records by Jamie xx, Mosca, Redinho and Sophie.

In 2013 Numbers, along with Dedbeat, started a weekender festival called 'Pleasure Principle'.

== Sexual assault controversy ==
In August 2018, after performing at the Love Saves the Day music festival in Bristol, Revill took the party drug GHB and while intoxicated, attempted to kiss and grab multiple members of festival staff without consent.

Following the incident, Revill issued a public statement on Facebook in which he apologised for behaving "inappropriately and offensively". His statement was subject to controversy as the vague nature of the apology fuelled further speculation. Love Saves the Day clarified the situation with its own statement, saying Revill's original, vague apology caused rumors which muddled the reason for the apology. The festival and Revill both agreed to issue follow-up statements to fully explain the extent of the DJ's behavior.

A victim gave a public statement that she was frustrated with the response to Revill's Facebook post, saying that "it was hijacked by untruths and lad humour," and said, "It is so important for Jack to clarify what happened." Love Saves the Day later made the following statement:

The position of the festival and its staff who were affected by Jack's behaviour on the night is that Jack has directly apologised to them, he's taken time out to work on himself and undertaken to never repeat this behaviour towards anyone else in future. He has our staff and the festival's support in working towards these aims and his own future happiness.

He subsequently pulled out of multiple lineups and withdrew temporarily from the limelight. Revill said he accepted responsibility for his actions and gave a public interview which coincided with his return to DJing about how "It Was All My Fault" and how "talking about my experiences is one of the first steps towards reaching one of my goals I set myself during recovery, which is to use my voice for good, and my voice to help others".

Following the incident, Revill changed the legal name of his UK Companies House registered production company from "Heavy Petting Ltd" to "Hillhead Endeavours Limited".

== Death ==
Revill died from a head injury sustained in Ibiza on 12 October 2024. He was 38. On Instagram, numerous artists from across the electronic music scene paid tribute to Revill, including Disclosure, Gorgon City and fellow Scottish DJ Ewan McVicar.

Following his death, Clash published an article remembering Revill's career, including its complexities, and his influence on the electronic music scene. Included were reflections from close friend and DJ Skream, who looked back on the time they lived together in Ibiza, and the Blessed Madonna stating "he fought demons in private and he fucked up in public and made amends just as publicly.”

A feature in Resident Advisor also highlighted the breadth of Revill's impact on the UK dance scene, boosting Glasgow's profile through clubs, labels, and events, as well as his support of other artists, noting he had a "major impact on the careers of thousands of artists, as well as the listening habits of countless more fans." The article covered the complexities of his career, including his personal struggles and the high-profile incident in 2018.

== Discography ==
=== DJ mixes ===
Some of Jackmaster's DJ mixes include:

- 2006: Numbers #001 – 60 Minutes of Numbers Episode #01 / From Paris to Baltimore via Detroit
- 2006: Numbers #006 – 60 Minutes of Numbers Episode #05 / Mastermix #2
- 2011: Resident Advisor Podcast 289
- 2011: FabricLive.57
- 2014-Mar-15 (Essential Mix Episode 1048) Jackmaster
- 2014: XLR8R Podcast 366 (28 Oct 2014)
- 2016: DjKicks Jackmaster
- 2016-Jun-18 (Essential Mix Episode 1166) Chemical Brothers & Jackmaster B2B Armand Van Helden Live @ Parklife Festival
- 2017-Jun-24 (Essential Mix Episode 1218) Richy Ahmed B2B Patrick Topping, Jackmaster & Peggy Gou @ Glastonbury
