= List of paintings by Arnold Böcklin =

Paintings by Swiss artist Arnold Böcklin

Below is a list of selected paintings by Swiss artist Arnold Böcklin.

Image	Title	Date	Technique	Size (cm)	Location	Note
	Mountain Lake	1846	Oil on canvas	32.5 × 52	Private collection	
	Landscape study	1846	Oil on cardboard	32 × 42	Lower Saxony State Museum, Hanover	
	Portrait of Alexander Mikhelis	1846		33 × 31.1	Kunstmuseum Basel	
	Mound	1847	oil on canvas	60.2 × 77.5	Kunstmuseum Basel	
	Landscape with castle ruins	1847	oil on canvas	60 × 78	Alte Nationalgalerie, Berlin	
	Portrait of Jakob Mähly as a student	1848	oil on canvas	32.6 × 24.4	Kunstmuseum Basel	
	Landscape with ruins in the moonlight	1849	oil on canvas	24.5 × 32.5	Private collection	
	Mountain landscape with a waterfall	c. 1849	oil on canvas	32.8 × 40.8	Kunstmuseum Basel	
	Mountain landscape with chamois	c. 1849	oil on canvas	32.5 × 41	Kunstmuseum Basel	
	In the Pontic marshes	1851	oil on canvas	73 × 98	Museum Kunstpalast, Düsseldorf	
	Landscape in Campania	1851	oil on canvas	57 × 77	Staatliche Kunsthalle Karlsruhe	
	Roman landscape	1852	oil on canvas	74.5 × 72.5	Brooklyn Museum, New York	
	Centaur and Nymph	1855	oil on canvas	88 × 76	Alte Nationalgalerie, Berlin	
	Nymph at a Spring	c. 1855	oil on canvas	129.6 × 112.8	Schackgalerie, Munich	
	At the Edge of the Forest	c. 1856	oil on canvas	67.5 × 94.5	Private collection	
	Bacchanalia	c. 1856	Oil on canvas	50 × 42	Kunstmuseum Winterthur, Switzerland	
	Pan in the Reeds	c. 1856–1857	oil on canvas	138 × 99.5	Kunstmuseum Winterthur, Switzerland	
	Teutons Hunting Boar	1858	oil on canvas	103.5 × 83	Wallraf-Richartz Museum, Cologne	
	Nymph in the meadow valley as the personification of the prehistoric era	1858	oil on fabric on hardboard	85 × 125	Private collection	
	Rocky Highlands with a Bridge	c. 1858	oil on canvas	42.5 × 34.5	Alte Nationalgalerie, Berlin	
	Pan in the Reeds. 2nd version	1859	oil on canvas	199.7 × 152.7	Neue Pinakothek, Munich	
	Campania	c. 1859	oil on canvas	88 × 105	Alte Nationalgalerie, Berlin	
	Abandoned Venus	c. 1860	oil on canvas	120 × 95	Kunstmuseum Basel	unfinished.
	Pan Frightens the Shepherd. 2nd version	c. 1860	oil on canvas	134.5 × 110.2	Schackgalerie, Munich	
	Rocky Landscape with hunting Centaurs	c. 1860	oil on canvas	? × ?	Schloss Weimar, Germany	
	Piper	c. 1860/1862	oil on canvas	49.6 × 73.7	Neue Pinakothek, Munich	
	Portrait of actress Fanny Janauschek	1861	oil on canvas	180 × 104.3	Städel Museum, Frankfurt-am-Main	
	Portrait of chamber singer Karl Wallenreiter	c. 1861	oil on canvas	77 × 63	Alte Nationalgalerie, Berlin	
	Self portrait	1862	oil on mahogany	39.5 × 31	Kunstmuseum Basel	
	Wandering light	1862	oil on canvas	81 × 59	Museum of Georg Schaefer, Schweinfurt, Germany	
	Portrait of the artist Franz von Lenbach	1862	oil on canvas	52.5 × 44.5	Österreichische Galerie Belvedere, Vienna	
	Sappho. 2nd version	1862	oil on canvas	94.9 × 73.7	Philadelphia Museum of Art	
	Self portrait with wife	1863	oil on canvas	63 × 49	Alte Nationalgalerie, Berlin	
	Angela Böcklin in a red hairnet	1863	wood, tempera and wax	41 × 32	Alte Nationalgalerie, Berlin	
	Head of a Roman	1863	oil on canvas	46.5 x 36.5	Kunstmuseum Basel, Switzerland	
	Field with bathing girls	1863	oil on canvas	20 × 36	Kunstmuseum Winterthur, Switzerland	
	Portrait of the sculptor Josef von Kopf	1863	cardboard, tempera and wax	40 × 32	Alte Nationalgalerie, Berlin	
	Roman landscape	1863	oil on canvas	44.5 × 35	Hamburg Kunsthalle, Germany	
	Faun, the whistling blackbird	1863	oil on canvas	46.5 × 36	Neue Pinakothek, Munich	
	Villa by the Sea. Sketch	c. 1863	oil on canvas	62.1 × 74.3	Neue Pinakothek, Munich	
	Hermit	c. 1863	oil on canvas	106 × 57.8	Schackgalerie, Munich	
	The Poet of Petrarch	1863/64	Tempera on canvas	60 × 93	Museum der bildenden Künste, Leipzig, Germany	
	Villa by the sea	1864	oil on canvas	124.5 × 174.5	Schackgalerie, Munich	
	Shepherdess	1864	oil on canvas	62 × 52.8	Schackgalerie, Munich	
	Portrait of Augusto Fratelli	c. 1864	oil on canvas	52 × 43	Hamburg Kunsthalle, Germany	
	Faun and whistling Blackbird. 2nd version	1864/65	oil on canvas	48.8 × 49	Lower Saxony State Museum, Hanover	
	Villa by the sea. 2nd version	1865	oil on canvas	123.4 × 173.2	Schackgalerie, Munich	
	Portrait of Margaret Antoinette Mähly-Shermar	1865	oil on canvas	28 × 22	Private collection	
	The Shepherd's complaint	1866	oil on canvas	137.9 × 100.4	Schackgalerie, Munich	
	Idyll	1866	oil on canvas	73 × 98	Kunsthaus Zürich, Switzerland	
	Girl and Boy picking Flowers	c. 1866	oil on canvas	62 × 50	Kunsthaus Zürich, Switzerland	
	The Lamentations of Mary Magdalene on the body of Christ	1867	oil on canvas	84 x 149	Kunstmuseum Basel, Switzerland	
	Spring of Love (Spring Source)	1868	oil on canvas	220 × 136	Hessisches Landesmuseum Darmstadt, Germany	
	The Birth of Venus	1868/69	oil on canvas	135.5 × 79	Hessisches Landesmuseum Darmstadt, Germany	
	Portrait of Friedrich Weber	1869	oil on canvas	46.5 × 38	Private collection	
	Dragon in a rocky Gorge	1870	oil on canvas	152 × 92.5	Schackgalerie, Munich	
	Night. 3rd version	1870	oil on canvas	136 × 79	Private collection	
	The Way to Emmaus	1870	oil on canvas	94 × 139.5	Schackgalerie, Munich	
	Ruined house near Kehl	1870	oil on canvas	20.7 × 35.4	Kunstmuseum Basel	
	Killer pursued by the Furies	1870	oil on canvas	80 × 141	Schackgalerie, Munich	
	Venus Anadiome	c. 1870	Oil on cardboard	59 × 48.2	Heilshof Museum, Worms	
	Italian Villa in Spring	c. 1870	oil on canvas	80 × 102	Schackgalerie, Munich	
	Mountain Castle with Marching Soldiers	1871	oil on canvas	76 × 109	Aargauer Kunsthaus, Switzerland	
	Perfect spring landscape	1871	oil on canvas	73.5 × 59.6	Schackgalerie, Munich	
	Nymph and Satyr	1871	oil on canvas	108 × 154.9	Philadelphia Museum of Art	
	Ride of Death (Autumn and Death)	1871	oil on canvas	79 × 136.5	Schackgalerie, Munich	
	Sacred Grove	c. 1871	oil on canvas	80.5 × 103.1	Schackgalerie, Munich	
	Villa by the sea. 3rd version	1871–1874	oil on canvas	108 × 154	Städel Museum, Frankfurt-am-Main	
	Self-Portrait with Death Playing the Fiddle	1872	oil on canvas	75 × 61	Alte Nationalgalerie, Berlin	
	Venus Anadiome	1872	oil on wood	59.1 × 45.7	Saint Louis Art Museum	
	Euterpe with Deer	1872	oil on canvas	78 × 58.3	Hessisches Landesmuseum Darmstadt, Germany	
	May Day in Ancient Rome	c. 1872	oil on canvas	75.7 × 61.6	Neue Pinakothek, Munich	
	Battle of the Centaurs	1872/1873	oil on canvas	104.2 × 194.3	Kunstmuseum Basel	
	Self portrait	1873	oil on canvas	61 × 48.9	Hamburg Kunsthalle, Germany	
	Adagio	1873	Tempera on canvas	78 × 105.5	Hessisches Landesmuseum Darmstadt, Germany	
	In the Spring	1873	oil on canvas	104.5 × 78	National Gallery of Victoria, Melbourne	
	Penitent Mary Magdalene	1873	oil on canvas	58 × 47	Hamburg Kunsthalle, Germany	
	Roger and Angelica	1873	tempera on wood	46 × 37	Alte Nationalgalerie, Berlin	
	Astolf leaves with Orrill's head	c. 1873	oil on canvas	54 × 77	Kunstmuseum Basel	
	Vestal	1874	oil on canvas	76 × 61.5	Hessisches Landesmuseum Darmstadt, Germany	
	Two fishing Pans	1874	oil on canvas	74.5 × 54.5	Foundation for Art, Culture and History, Winterthur, Switzerland	
	Triton and Nereid	1874	Tempera on canvas	105.3 × 194	Schackgalerie, Munich	
	Spring	1875	tempera on wood	63 × 50.5	Museum der bildenden Künste, Leipzig, Germany	
	Sirens	1875	Tempera on canvas	46 × 31	Alte Nationalgalerie, Berlin	
	Triton and Nereid. 3rd version	1875	oil on wood	41.5 × 66	St. Gallen Museum of Art, St. Gallen, Switzerland	
	Faun blowing a Syrinx	1875	oil on canvas	62.7 × 50.2	Neue Pinakothek, Munich	
	Flora Scattering Flowers	1875	oil on wood	82.5 × 51.5	Museum Folkwang, Essen, Germany	
	Mourning under the Cross	1876	tempera on wood	164 × 250	Alte Nationalgalerie, Berlin	
	Songs of Spring	1876	oil on canvas	61.5 × 51.4	Pushkin Museum, Moscow	
	Charon	1876	oil on wood	60 × 46.5	Museum of Georg Schaefer, Schweinfurt, Germany	
	Elysium	1877	Tempera on canvas	37 × 55	Kunstmuseum Winterthur, Switzerland	
	Triton and Nereid. Sketch	1877	tempera on paper on wood	44.5 × 65.5	Kunstmuseum Winterthur, Switzerland	
	Treasure keeper	1877	oil on cardboard	73.5 × 50	Museum der bildenden Künste, Leipzig, Germany	
	Sleeping Diana, contemplated by two fauns	1877/1885	oil on canvas	77.4 × 105	Museum Kunstpalast, Düsseldorf	
	Villa by the Sea. 5th version	1878	oil on canvas	110 × 160	Winterthur Museum of Art, Winterthur	
	Honeymoon. 2nd version	1878	Tempera on canvas	79 × 60	Alte Nationalgalerie, Berlin	
	Head of Medusa	c. 1878	oil on wood	39 × 37	Germanisches Nationalmuseum, Nuremberg, Germany	
	Spring Evening	1879	oil on wood	67.4 × 129.5	Museum of Fine Arts (Budapest)	
	Sea surf (Sound). 2nd version	1879	oil on wood	121 × 82	Alte Nationalgalerie, Berlin	
	Triton blowing into a Conch Shell	1879	oil on wood	80.8 × 54.5	Lower Saxony State Museum, Hanover	
	Isle of the Dead	1880	oil on canvas	110.9 × 156.4	Kunstmuseum Basel	
	Isle of the Dead. 2nd version	1880	oil on wood	73.7 × 121.9	Metropolitan Museum of Art, New York	
	The Awakening of Spring	1880	Oil on canvas on wood	66 × 130	Kunsthaus Zürich, Switzerland	
	Ruin by the Sea	1880	oil on canvas	100.5 × 142	Aargauer Kunsthaus, Switzerland	
	Summer Day	1881	oil on mahogany	61 × 50	Galerie Neue Meister, Dresden	
	Spring in the Gorge	1881	oil on canvas	84.5 × 59.4	Getty Center, Los Angeles	
	Ruin by the Sea	1881	oil on canvas	111 × 82	Cleveland Museum of Art	
	The Adventurer	1882	Tempera on canvas	116 × 150.5	Kunsthalle Bremen, Germany	
	Odysseus and Calypso	1882	oil on mahogany	103.5 × 149.8	Kunstmuseum Basel	
	Sacred Grove	1882	oil on canvas	105 × 150.6	Kunstmuseum Basel	
	Playing in the Waves	1883	oil on canvas	180 × 238	Neue Pinakothek, Munich	
	In the Sea	1883	oil on wood	86.5 × 115	Art Institute of Chicago	
	Isle of the Dead. 3rd version	1883	oil on wood	80 × 150	Alte Nationalgalerie, Berlin	
	Hermit	1884	oil on wood	90 × 69	Alte Nationalgalerie, Berlin	
	Pan in a Children's Dance	1884	mixed media on mahogany	79 × 100.1	Museum Folkwang, Essen	
	Arable Fields in early Spring	1884	oil on wood	54 × 72	Alte Nationalgalerie, Berlin	unfinished
	The Sanctuary of Hercules	1884	oil on wood	113.8 × 180.5	National Gallery of Art, Washington	
	God shows Paradise to Adam	c. 1884	tempera on wood	87 × 121	Museum für Kunst und Kulturgeschichte, Dortmund, Germany	
	Self portrait with a glass of wine	1885	oil and tempera on wood	98 × 77	Alte Nationalgalerie, Berlin	
	Silence of the Forest	1885	oil on wood	73 × 58.5	National Museum, Poznań	
	Chained Prometheus. 2nd version	1885	oil on wood	98.5 × 125	Hessisches Landesmuseum Darmstadt, Germany	
	Nereid Game	1886	oil on canvas	150.5 × 176.4	Kunstmuseum Basel	
	Pirate Attack (Heroic Landscape). 2nd version	1886	oil on mahogany	153 × 232	Wallraf-Richartz Museum, Cologne	
	Isle of the Dead. 5th version	1886	oil on wood	80.7 × 150	Museum der bildenden Künste, Leipzig, Germany	
	Sacred Grove. 2nd version	1886	oil on mahogany	100 × 150	Hamburg Kunsthalle, Germany	
	Calm Sea	1886/1887	wood, tempera and enamel	103 × 150	Museum of Fine Arts Bern, Switzerland	
	Homecoming	1887	oil on wood	78.5 × 100	Private collection	
	Sea Idyll	1887	oil on wood	167 × 224	Österreichische Galerie Belvedere, Vienna	
	Anthem of the Spring (Three Graces)	1888	tempera on wood	125 × 97	Museum der bildenden Künste, Leipzig, Germany	
Susanna and the Elders	Susanna and the Elders	1888			Museum Gouda, South Holland, The Netherlands	
	Centaur at the Village Blacksmith	1888	oil on wood	78.5 × 100	Museum of Fine Arts (Budapest), Hungary	
	Island of the Living	1888	oil on mahogany	93.3 × 140.1	Kunstmuseum Basel	
	Judith	1888	tempera on wood	46 × 37	Museum of Georg Schaefer, Schweinfurt, Germany	
	Portrait of Gottfried Keller	c. 1889	oil on canvas	81.5 × 55.5	Kunsthaus Zürich, Switzerland	
	Honeymoon. 3rd version	c. 1890	oil on wood	72 × 52.5	Städel Museum, Frankfurt-am-Main	
	Freedom (Helvetia)	1891	oil on wood	96 × 96	Alte Nationalgalerie, Berlin	
	In the Garden Gazebo	c. 1891	oil on wood	99 × 75	Kunsthaus Zürich, Switzerland	
	St. Anthony Preaches to the Fish	1892	oil on canvas	152 × 105	Kunsthaus Zürich, Switzerland	
	Self portrait in the Studio	1893	Tempera on canvas	120 × 80.8	Kunstmuseum Basel	
	Venus the Ancestor	1895	oil on canvas	105 × 150	Kunsthaus Zürich, Switzerland	
	Paolo and Francesca	1893	oil on canvas	110.5 × 80	Kunstmuseum Winterthur, Switzerland	
	Diana the Huntress. 2nd version	1895/1896	oil on canvas	99.5 × 200.5	Musee d'Orsay, Paris	
	War	1896	oil on board	100 × 69.5	Galerie Neue Meister, Dresden, Germany	
	War	1896	oil on wood	222 × 170	Kunsthaus Zürich, Switzerland	unfinished
	Odysseus and Polyphemus	1896	oil and tempera on wood	66 × 150	Museum of Fine Arts (Boston)	
	Pan and Dryads	1897	oil on canvas	91 × 140	Von der Heydt Museum, Wuppertal, Germany	
	Nessus and Deianeira	1898	oil on wood	104 × 150	Museum Pfalzgalerie, Kaiserslautern	
	Chapel	1898	oil on canvas	94 × 70.5	Private collection	
	Plague	1898	tempera on wood	149.5 × 104.5	Kunstmuseum Basel	
	Self portrait	1898–1899	oil on canvas	40 × 54	Uffizi, Florence	
	Furious Roland	1901	oil and tempera on canvas	103 × 150	Museum der bildenden Künste, Leipzig, Germany	unfinished.
	Isle of the Dead. 6th version	1901	oil on board		Hermitage Museum, St. Petersburg, Russia	By Arnold and Carlo Böcklins.
