= War (Böcklin painting) =

Title of two paintings by Arnold Böcklin

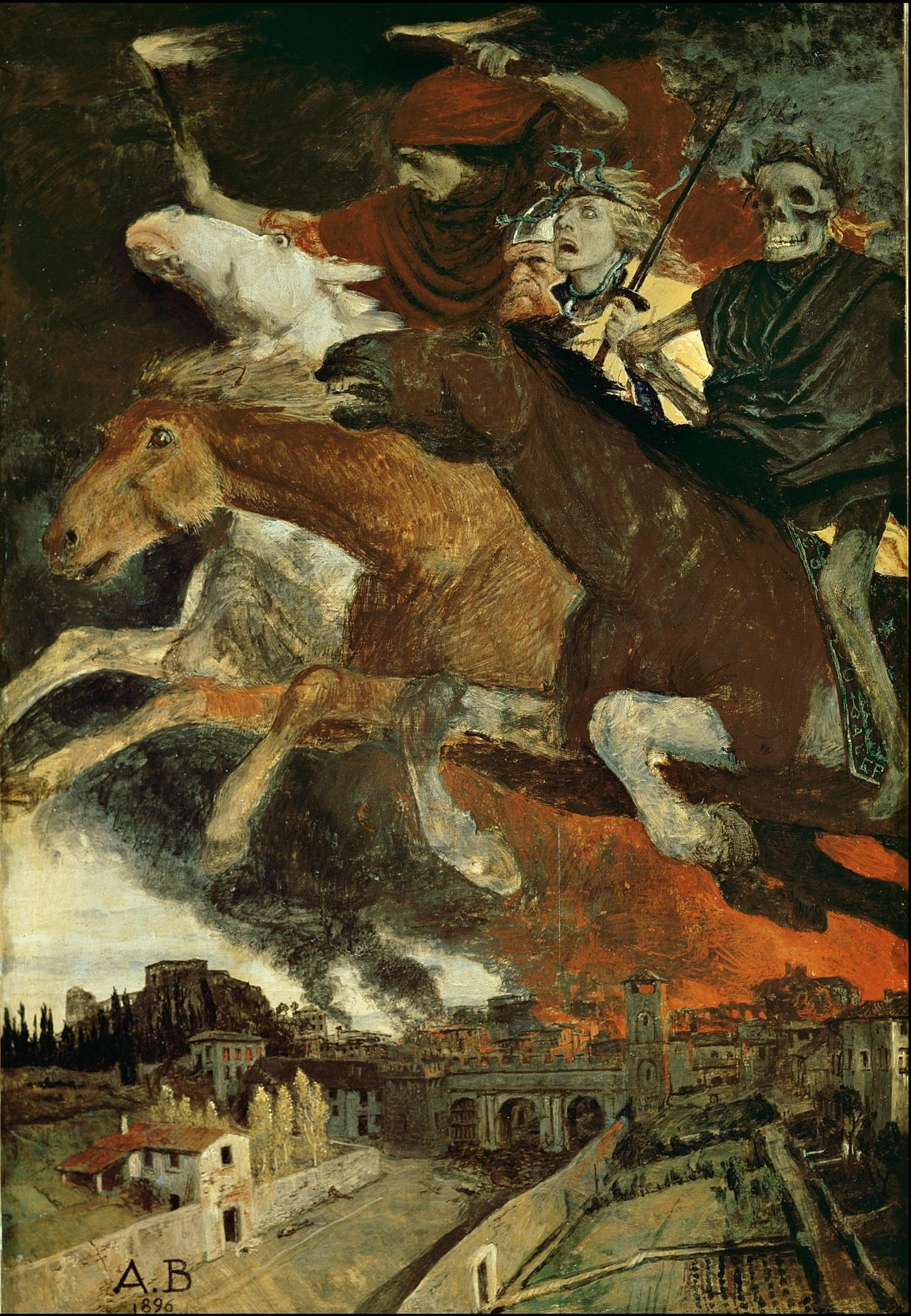
- Artist: Arnold Böcklin
- Year: 1896
- Type: oil on limewood
- Dimensions: 100 cm × 69.5 cm (39 in × 27.4 in)
- Location: Galerie Neue Meister, Dresden, Germany

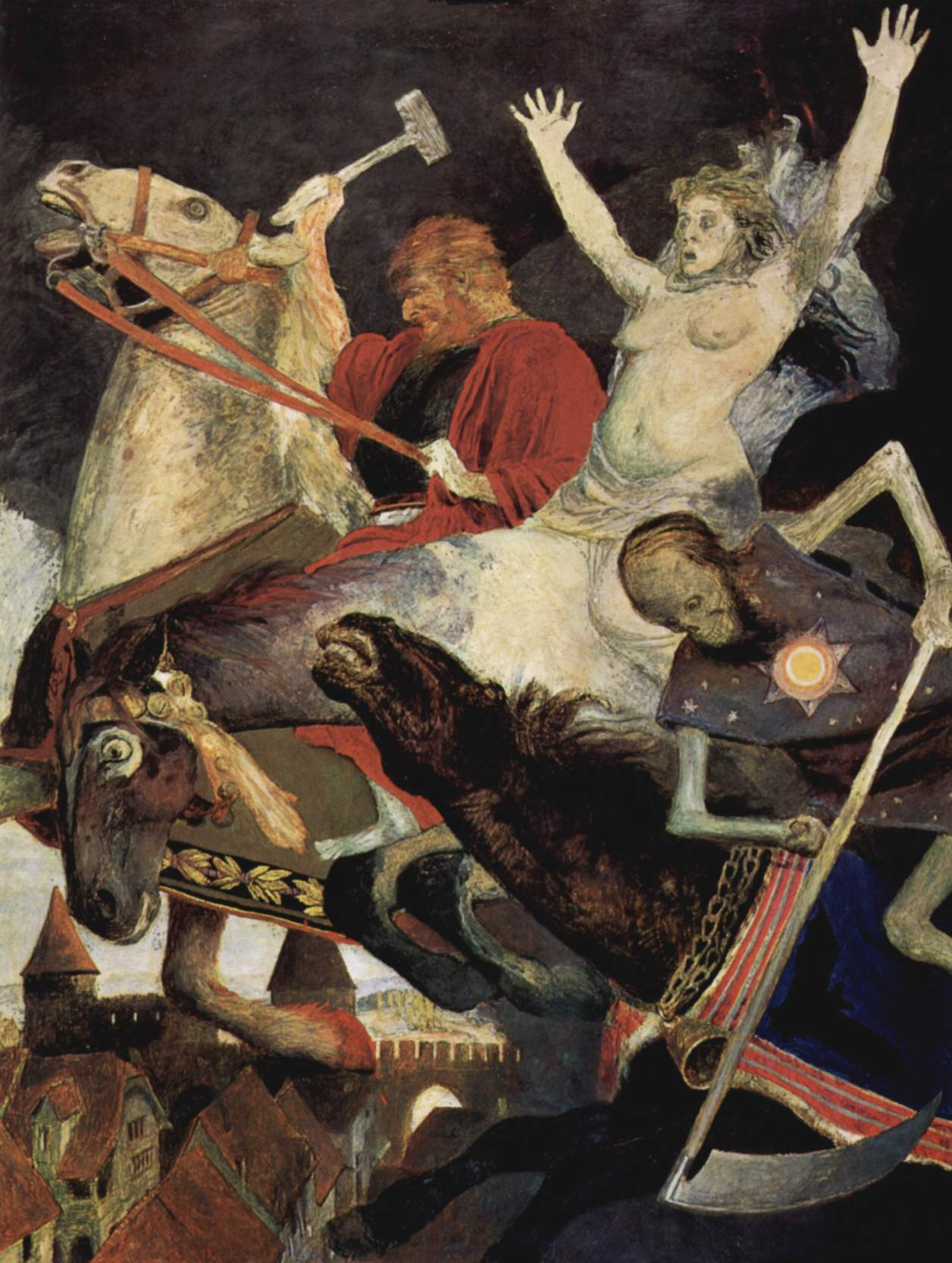
War (unfinished second version, 1896, Kunsthaus Zurich)

War (German: Der Krieg) is the title of two oil paintings on the same theme completed in quick succession in 1896 by the Swiss Symbolist painter Arnold Böcklin. The first version is in the collection of the Galerie Neue Meister, Dresden and the second, defined as unfinished, in the Kunsthaus Zürich in Switzerland.

Painted when Böcklin was 69 and living in difficult circumstances in Italy, the pictures appear to express a disillusioned yet prophetic view of the future of mankind. They hark back in concept to Albrecht Dürer's famous woodcut of The Four Horsemen of the Apocalypse (c. 1497–98), based on Revelation 6:1–8.

The first version depicts four riders, including War, Pestilence, and Death, riding furiously through the air above a classical city. In the second version the number of riders is simplified to three and the landscape replaced by a medieval town.

Böcklin would revisit his vision of global plague in his painting Plague, executed in 1898.

== See also ==
- List of paintings by Arnold Böcklin
