= The Sanctuary of Hercules (Böcklin) =

1884 painting by Arnold Böcklin

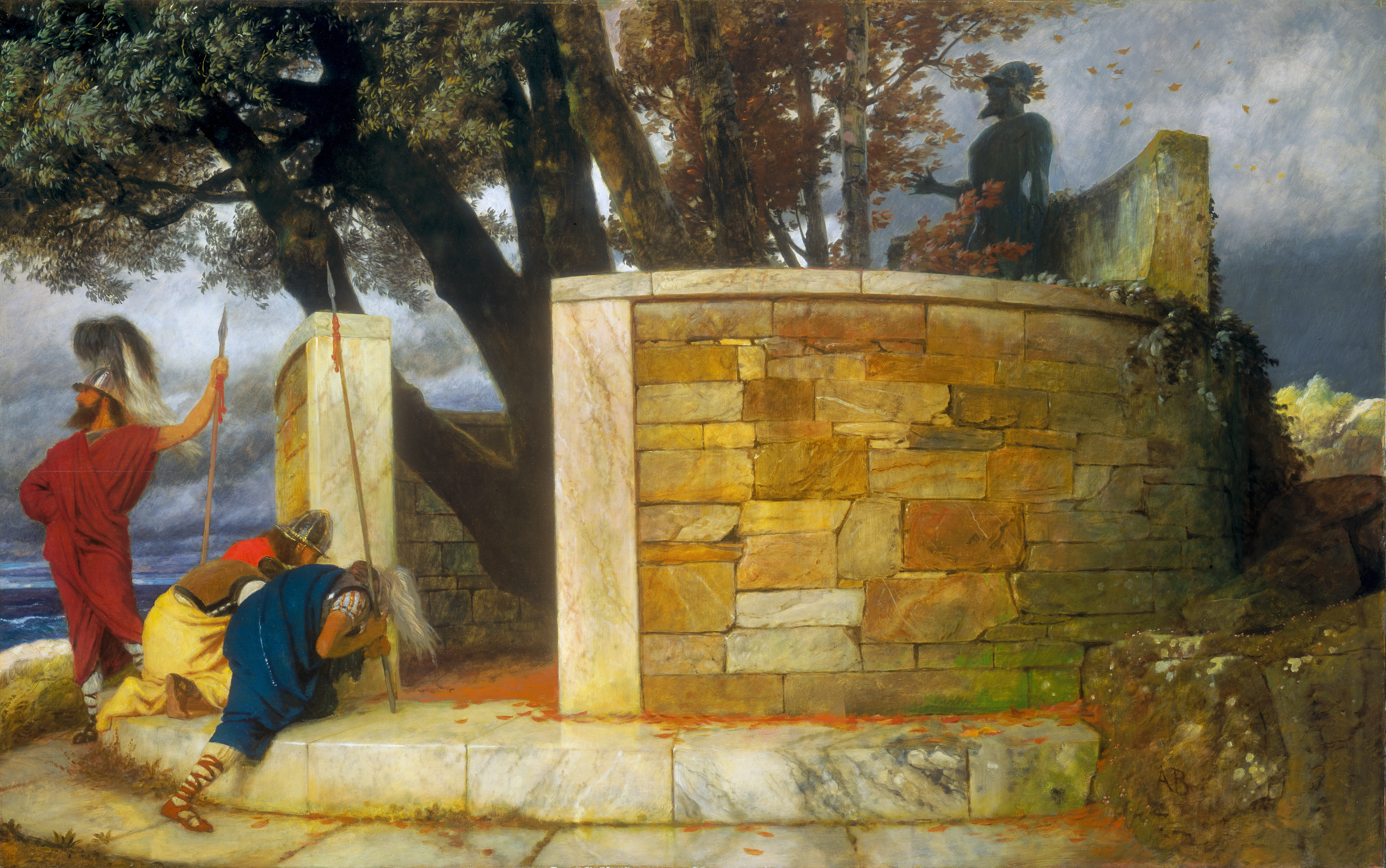
- Artist: Arnold Böcklin
- Year: 1884
- Medium: Oil on wood
- Dimensions: 113.8 cm × 180.5 cm (44.8 in × 71.1 in)
- Location: National Gallery of Art, Washington, D.C.

The Sanctuary of Hercules (German: Das Heiligtum des Herkules) is an oil on wood painting executed in 1884 by the Swiss symbolist painter Arnold Böcklin. It is in the collection of the National Gallery of Art in Washington, D.C.

The work depicts three soldiers kneeling on the steps of a shrine to the Greek hero Heracles whilst a fourth soldier keeps guard. Sunlight shining through an approaching storm illuminates the group and the circular stonework of the shrine, within which is a sacred grove and a statue of the great hero and protector. The central feature of the painting is the dressed stone wall, trimmed with polished marble, which has a much admired luminescent quality.

The work is one of a series of depictions of holy and mysterious mythological sites imagined by the artist.

== See also ==
- List of paintings by Arnold Böcklin
