= Spring Evening (Böcklin) =

1879 painting by Arnold Böcklin

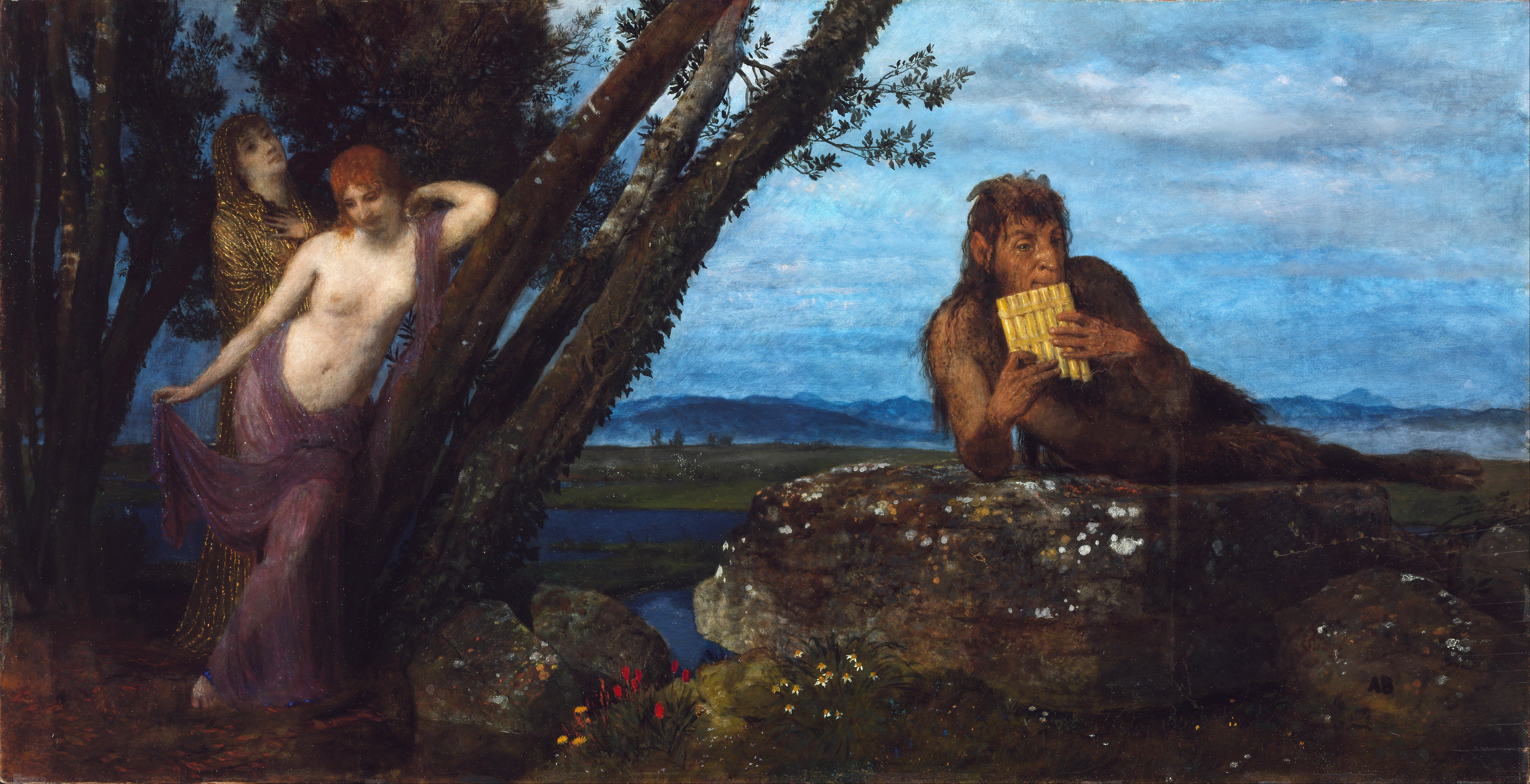
- Artist: Arnold Böcklin
- Year: 1879
- Type: oil on panel
- Dimensions: 67.4 cm × 129.5 cm (26.5 in × 51.0 in)
- Location: Museum of Fine Arts (Budapest), Budapest

Spring Evening is an oil on panel painting completed in 1879 by the German Symbolist painter Arnold Böcklin which belongs in the collection of the Museum of Fine Arts, Budapest.

The painting depicts the god Pan playing his pipes to woodland nymphs, a theme to which Böcklin returned several times.

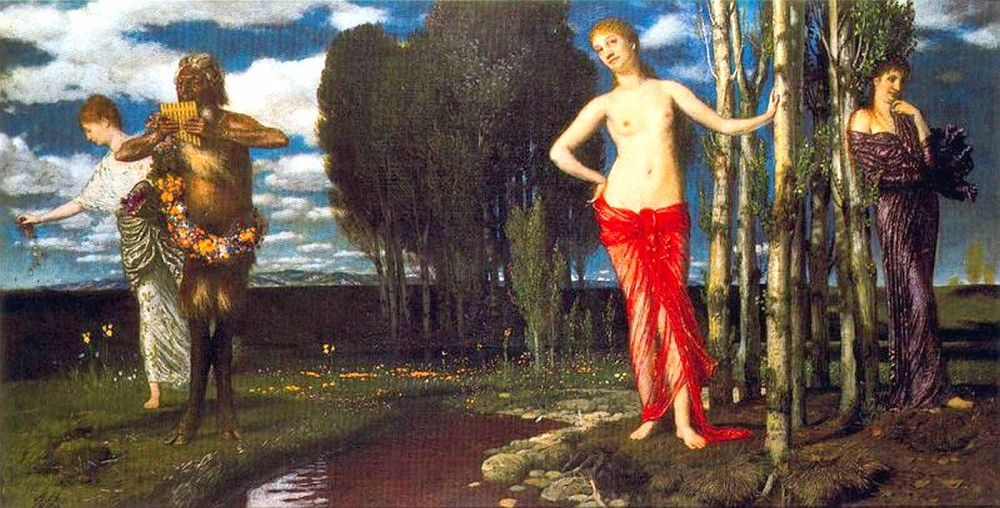
Spring Awakening, 1880, Kunsthaus Zürich

== See also ==
- 100 Great Paintings, 1980 BBC series
- List of paintings by Arnold Böcklin
