= FabricLive.58 =

Compilation album by FabricLive
- Released: July 2011
- Label: Fabric
- Producer: Goldie

FabricLive chronology
FabricLive.57 (2011)	FabricLive.58 (2011)	FabricLive.59 (2011)

Professional ratings
Review scores
Source	Rating
Resident Advisor	4/5 stars

FabricLive.58 is a 2011 DJ mix album by Goldie. The album was released as part of the FabricLive Mix Series.

== Track listing ==
1. Rido feat. Thomas Oliver - Twisted - Metalheadz
2. Marcus Intalex feat. S. P. Y. - Celestial Navigation - Soul:r
3. Lenzman - Lasers - Metalheadz
4. Need For Mirrors - Lofar - Metalheadz
5. Enei - One Chance VIP - Critical
6. Subwave & Enei - The Mines - Metalheadz
7. S.I.N. & Mutated Forms - Right Now - Spearhead
8. Fresh - The Gatekeeper - Ram
9. DJ Hazard - Proteus - Playaz
10. Critical Impact & Komonazmuk - Translation - Metalheadz
11. Adam F - Metropolis - Metalheadz
12. Mutated Forms - Crowlin - Metalheadz
13. Jubei - Patience VIP - Metalheadz
14. Rido - Focus - Metalheadz
15. Basher feat. Xtrah - Convulsions - Ram
16. Mutated Forms - Doubts - Grid
17. A Sides - One DJ - Clear Skyz
18. Mark System feat. Youngman - Hold It - Digital Soundboy
19. Icicle feat. Robert Owens - Redemption (Alix Perez Remix) - Shogun Audio
20. Lenzman - Open Page (Subwave Remix) - Metalheadz
21. dBridge - Cornered - Exit
22. Jubei - Alignment (Boddika Remix) - Metalheadz
23. Mikal - Higher Forces - Metalheadz
24. Wickaman & RV - Ev's Dead - Ram
25. J Majik & Wickaman - Old Headz - Metalheadz
26. Commix - Be True - Metalheadz
27. Goldie - Timeless - FFRR
