= Odysseus and Polyphemus (Böcklin) =

Painting by Arnold Böcklin

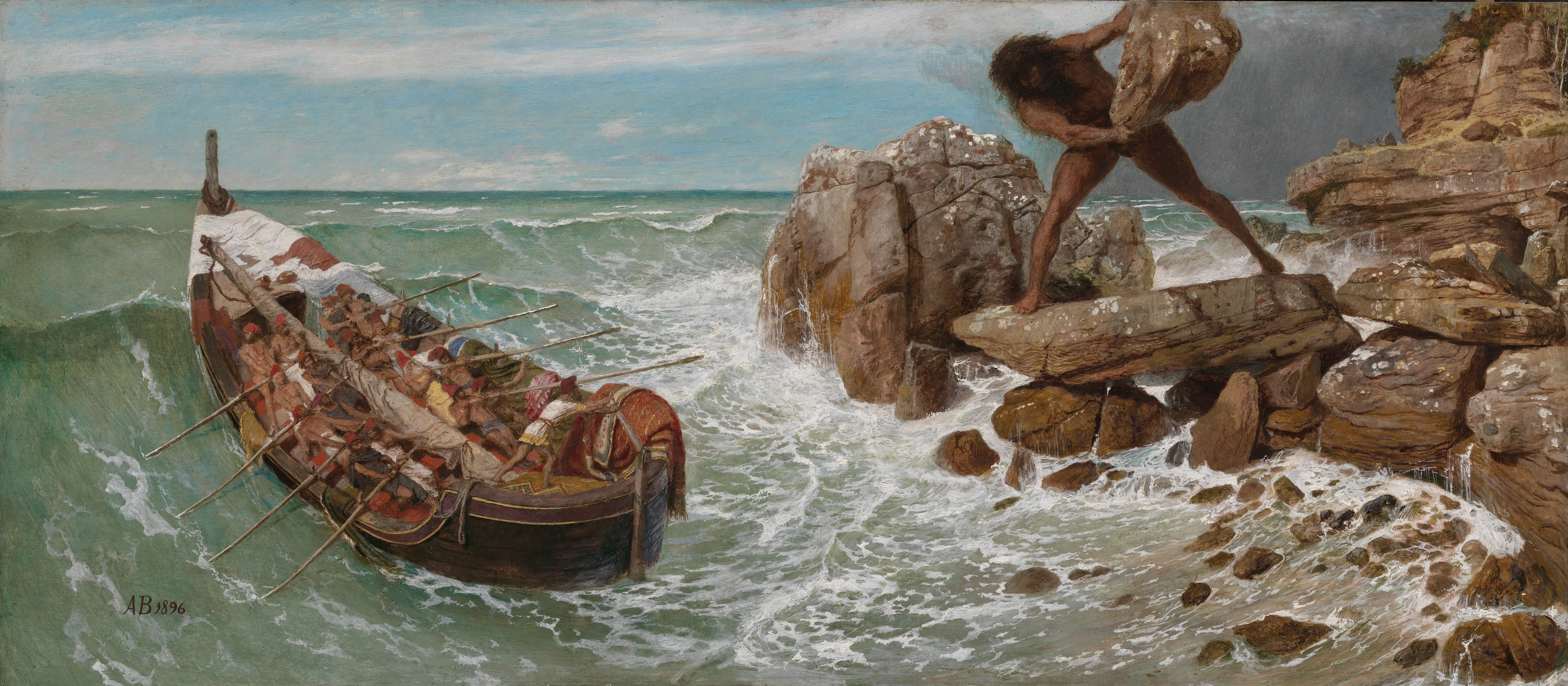
- Artist: Arnold Böcklin
- Year: 1896
- Type: oil and tempera on panel
- Dimensions: 66 cm × 150 cm (26 in × 59 in)
- Location: Museum of Fine Arts; Boston

Odysseus and Polyphemus is an 1896 oil painting by the Swiss artist Arnold Böcklin. It has been part of the collection of the Museum of Fine Arts, Boston, since 2012.

== History and description ==
The painting depicts an incident in the Odyssey, the epic poem by Homer which recounts the Greek hero Odysseus' 10 year long return journey home from the Siege of Troy. A blind giant Cyclops, Polyphemus, is preparing to hurl a large rock at the escaping boat of Odysseus and his crew. Odysseus in return is taunting him from the stern of the vessel.

The previous night Odysseus and his shipmates had been shut in the cave of the one-eyed Polyphemus who had planned to eat them one by one. However Odysseus and his shipmates had managed to blind the Cyclops by driving a stake into his eye after he had fallen into a drunken stupor. They were then able to escape from the cave by hiding under his sheep when the flock was allowed out to graze.

The subject is characteristic of Böcklin's treatment of the more down-to-earth aspects of mythological stories. The naturalistic setting reflects his early training as a landscape artist.

== See also ==
- List of paintings by Arnold Böcklin
