= FabricLive.56 =

Compilation album by FabricLive
- Released: March 2011
- Label: Fabric
- Producer: David Kennedy

FabricLive chronology
FabricLive.55 (2011)	FabricLive.56 (2011)	FabricLive.57 (2011)

Professional ratings
Review scores
Source	Rating
Resident Advisor	4/5 stars

FabricLive.56 is a 2011 DJ mix album by David Kennedy using his two monikers, Pearson Sound and Ramadanman. The album was released as part of the FabricLive Mix Series. It was released on 21 March 2011.

== Track listing ==
1. Pearson Sound - Hawker - Unreleased
2. Levon Vincent - Late Night Jam - Ostgut Ton
3. Elgato - Music (Body Mix) - Hessle Audio
4. Marcello Napoletano - Everyday Madness - Rush Hour
5. Tiyiselani Vomaseve - Vanghoma - Honest Jon's
6. Pearson Sound - Wad (Bonus Beats) - Hessle Audio
7. Julio Bashmore - Battle for Middle You - PMR
8. Ramadanman - Grab Somebody - white label
9. Appleblim & Ramadanman - Void 23 (Carl Craig Re-edit) - Aus
10. Pearson Sound - Project - Unreleased
11. Joy Orbison - GR Etiquette (Pearson Sound Symphonic Mix) - Doldrums
12. J:Kenzo - Ruckas (Rob Kemp Remix) - Roska Kicks & Snares
13. Fugative - Bad Girl (Lil Silva Dub) - Ministry of Sound
14. A Made Up Sound - Demons - A Made Up Sound
15. Jam City - Night Mode - Night Slugs
16. Mr Mageeka - Different Lekstrix - Numbers
17. Pangaea - Inna Daze - Hessle Audio
18. Pearson Sound - Stifle - Hessle Audio
19. MJ Cole & Wiley - From The Drop - Prolific
20. Pinch - Qawwali - Planet Mu
21. Ramadanman x Joy Orbison - J. Doe Them - Swamp81 / Doldrums
22. Pearson Sound - Picon - Unreleased
23. Burial - Pirates - Hyperdub
24. Die Barbie Musik Kollektiv - Face [Junk] - Unreleased
25. Girl Unit - IRL (Original / Bok Bok Remix) - Night Slugs
26. D1 - Subzero - Submerged
27. 2 tracks mixed:
  1. S-X - Woooo - S-X Beats
  2. Ramadanman - Glut - Hemlock
28. Addison Groove - Fuk Tha 101 - Hessle Audio
29. 2 tracks mixed:
  1. Mala (Digital Mystikz) - City Cycle - Tectonic
  2. Joe - Claptrap (Tease) - Hessle Audio
30. Sigha - Light Swells (In A Distant Space) - Hotflush
