= FabricLive.57 =

Compilation album by FabricLive
- Released: May 2011
- Label: Fabric
- Producer: Jackmaster

FabricLive chronology
| FabricLive.56 (2011) | FabricLive.57 (2011) | FabricLive.58 (2011) |

Professional ratings
Review scores
| Source | Rating |
|---|---|
| Resident Advisor | 4.5/5 stars |

FabricLive.57 is a DJ album by Jackmaster. It was released in 2011 as part of the FabricLive Mix Series.

== Track listing ==
1. The Fantastic Aleems – Release Yourself – NIA
2. Inner City – Big Fun (Magic Juan Remix) – Virgin
3. Gregor Salto – Classic Beat Tool – G-REX
4. Model 500 – Night Drive (Thru-Babylon) – Metroplex
5. Kim English – Nite Life (Armand's Retail Mix) – Nervous
6. Anthony Shakir – Plugged In – Rush Hour
7. Martyn – Alldayallnight – 3024
8. Geiom feat. Terrible Shock – 2 4 6 – unreleased
9. Doug Willis – Dougswana (Audiowhores Beats) – Z
10. Jook10 – Emotions – Soulserious
11. Larry Heard pres. Mr. White – The Sun Can't Compare – Alleviated
12. Addison Groove – Make Um Bounce – Tectonic
13. Sinden & SBTRKT – Seekwal – Grizzly
14. Splack Pack – Shake That Ass Bitch – Pandisc
15. Davina – Don't You Want It – Happy
16. Sia – Little Man (Wookie Remix) – Long Lost Brother
17. CLS – Can You Feel It? (In House Dub) – Strictly Rhythm
18. DJ Deeon – The Freaks – Juke Trax
19. The Outlander – Vamp – R&S
20. Splack Pack – Scrub Da Ground – Pandisc
21. UR – Jupiter Jazz – Underground Resistance
22. Thomas Bangalter – What To Do – Roulé
23. Fix – Flash – NightVision
24. Hudson Mohawke – Fuse – Warp
25. Machinedrum – La Bomba – unreleased
26. DJ Funk – Pussy Ride – Funk
27. AFX – VBS Redlot B – Rephlex
28. Skepta – Doin' It Again – Boy Better Know
29. Radiohead – Idioteque – EMI
