= FabricLive.55 =

Compilation album by FabricLive
- Released: February 15, 2011
- Genre: Drum and Bass
- Length: 1:12:53
- Label: Fabric
- Producer: DJ Marky

FabricLive chronology
FabricLive.54 (2010)	FabricLive.55 (2011)	FabricLive.56 (2011)

Professional ratings
Review scores
Source	Rating
AllMusic	4/5 stars

FabricLive.55 is a 2011 DJ mix album by DJ Marky. The album was released as part of the FabricLive Mix Series.

== Track listing ==
No.	Title	Length
1.	"By Your Side" (featuring Spy)	5:06
2.	"Rolling Times" (featuring Dramatic and dbAudio)	3:56
3.	"Yellow Shoes" (featuring Spy)	1:48
4.	"Bright Lights [Rollers Mix]" (featuring William Cartwright, Die and Interface)	3:46
5.	"Chess Funk" (featuring Lynx)	2:51
6.	"Section" (featuring Vicious Circle and Fierce)	3:13
7.	"Will You Still Love Me?" (featuring Klute)	4:17
8.	"Untold" (featuring Deeizm and Makoto)	4:50
9.	"Even If" (featuring Calibre)	5:43
10.	"T1" (featuring 8 Bits and Q-Project)	1:47
11.	"Notes from the Block" (featuring Illskillz and Logistics)	2:09
12.	"Millers" (featuring Heavy 1)	2:08
13.	"Nowhere" (featuring Icicle)	1:47
14.	"Motorway" (featuring Skream)	3:56
15.	"Steady" (featuring Marcus Intalex)	3:13
16.	"Control" (featuring Siren)	2:08
17.	"Hotspot" (featuring Spy)	2:30
18.	"Matchstick V.I.P." (featuring Nymfo)	1:23
19.	"Time After Time" (featuring Break)	2:36
20.	"Brainstorm" (featuring Spy)	4:01
21.	"Cathedral" (featuring Culture Shock)	1:49
22.	"Double Double" (featuring Commix)	1:49
23.	"Paulista Dub" (featuring Marcus Intalex and Spy)	2:11
24.	"Mystic Sunset" (featuring Spy)	3:56
