= Marco Polo Fest =

Marco Polo Fest (Croatian: Marko Polo Fest) is a Croatian pop music and wine 2-day festival held on the island of Korčula since 1996. The festival was organised to celebrate and honor the 700th anniversary of the merchant traveler Marco Polo.

== Grand Prix winners ==
- 1996 - Carlo Pedron with "Afrodita Korčula"
- 1997 - Vinko Coce with "Kad me nikad neće"
- 1998 - Vinko Coce with "Žmul vina"
- 1999 - Alen Vitasović with "Nisam bio za tebe"
- 2000 - Tereza Kesovija with "Sastala se stara klapa"
- 2001 - Đuka Čaić with "Evo rode"
- 2002 - Neno Belan and Fiumensi with "Ka'vanna"
- 2003 - Saša Lendero and Miha Hercog with "Sunce izlazi"
- 2004 - Alen Vitasović with "Ja dat ću sve"
- 2005 - Dražen Žanko with "Ljetna je noć"
- 2006 - Ivan Šegedin and Tin Ujević with "Rodi majko zemlji sina"
- 2007 - Yang Xiaoguang with "Nek je sretna China i Croatia"

== See also ==
- Croatian music festivals
