= FabricLive.54 =

Compilation album by FabricLive
- Released: November 2010
- Genre: Reggae, Dancehall
- Label: Fabric
- Producer: David Rodigan

FabricLive chronology
FabricLive.53 (2010)	FabricLive.54 (2010)	FabricLive.55 (2011)

FabricLive.54 is a 2010 DJ mix album by David Rodigan. The album was released as part of the FabricLive Mix Series.

== Track listing ==
1. Augustus Pablo - King Tubby meets Rockers Uptown - Yard Music / Rockers International
2. Big Youth - Waterhouse Rock - VP
3. Alborosie - Kingston Town - Greensleeves
4. Etana - August Town - VP
5. Chezidek - Borderline - Mideya
6. Romain Virgo - Live mi Life - VP
7. Cham - Ghetto Story - Warner
8. Super Cat - Don Dada - Sony
9. Pinchers - Bandelero - Necessary Mayhem
10. Prince Alla - Bucket Bottom - Freedom Sounds
11. King Tubby - Roots of Dub - Total Sounds
12. Joe Gibbs & Errol T - He Prayed (Dubbed) - VP
13. Tenor Saw - Ring the Alarm - Techniques
14. Mr. Vegas & Konshens - Help me Praise Jahoviah - Maximum Sound
15. Bitty McLean - Plead my Cause - Mideya / TAXI / Silent River
16. Beres Hammond - Can you Play some More - VP
17. Cadenza - Stop that Train - Headlock
18. Sly and Robbie, Lenky & the Maximum Sound Crew - Black Board - Maximum Sound
19. Shaggy - Church Heathen - Big Yard
20. Collie Buddz - Come Around - Sony
21. Million Stylez - Police in Helicopter - Necessary Mayhem
