= Urban Fest Osijek =

Annual music festival in Osijek, Croatia

- Genre: Urban music
- Dates: Early June
- Locations: Osijek, Croatia
- Years active: 2004–present
- Website: ufo.com.hr

Urban Fest Osijek or UFO is an international festival of urban music held annually in Osijek, Croatia. It has been held since 2004. In 2009 it was proclaimed for the best demo festival in Croatia in 2008-09 year.

== See also ==
- List of electronic music festivals
- Live electronic music
