= Schackgalerie =

Coordinates: 48°08′32″N 11°35′36″E

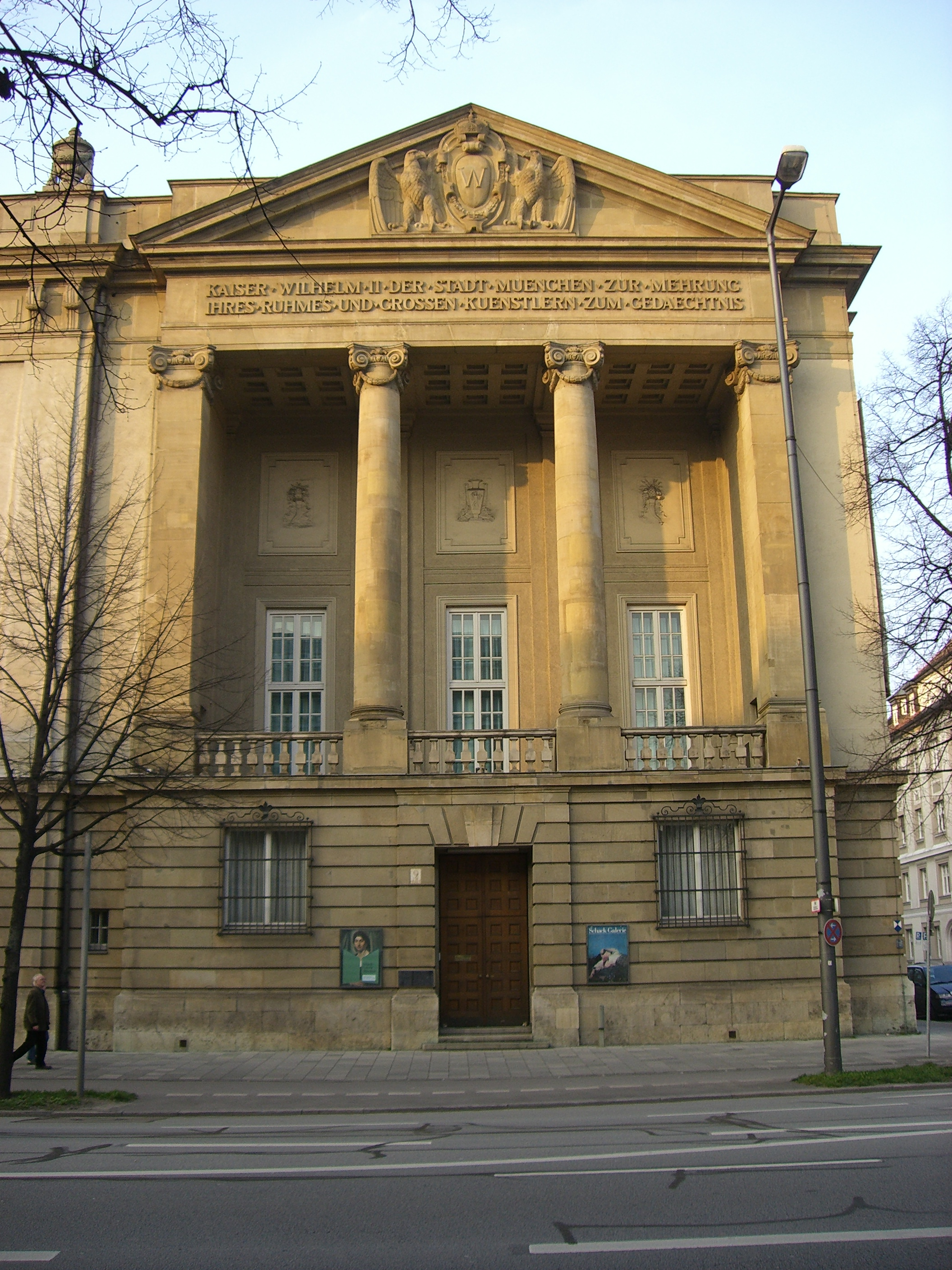
Schack-Galerie on Prinzregentenstraße

The Schack-Galerie, also referred to as Sammlung Schack (the collection Schack) is a museum in Munich. It is one of the main permanent art galleries in the city and primarily covers 19th century German art. The museum is under the administration of the Bavarian State Painting Collections.

== Collection ==
In 1855, Adolf Friedrich von Schack settled in Munich and became a member of the academy of sciences. Shack amassed a collection of paintings that included masterpieces of Romanticism, in particular by German painters. These included Anselm Feuerbach, Moritz von Schwind, Arnold Böcklin, Franz von Lenbach, Carl Spitzweg, Carl Rottmann, and others. Upon his death in 1894, he bequeathed the collection to the Emperor William II, however it remained in Munich. The collection includes some 180 paintings.

== Building ==
The collection is housed in a building designed by Max Littmann (1907) on the Prinzregentenstraße in Munich. The building is next to the former diplomatic mission of Prussia, as Emperor Wilhelm II decided to keep the collection in Munich after it passed to him. The gallery building with its upper-level portico and the adjacent tract of the former Prussian embassy, appear as two independent building complexes, but are unified by a common base and corniceoring the connection. The façades of the buildings are built with bright sandstone. In the tympanium is an imperial coat of arms and a dedication by William II.

== Gallery ==
Selection of paintings in the Schackgalerie

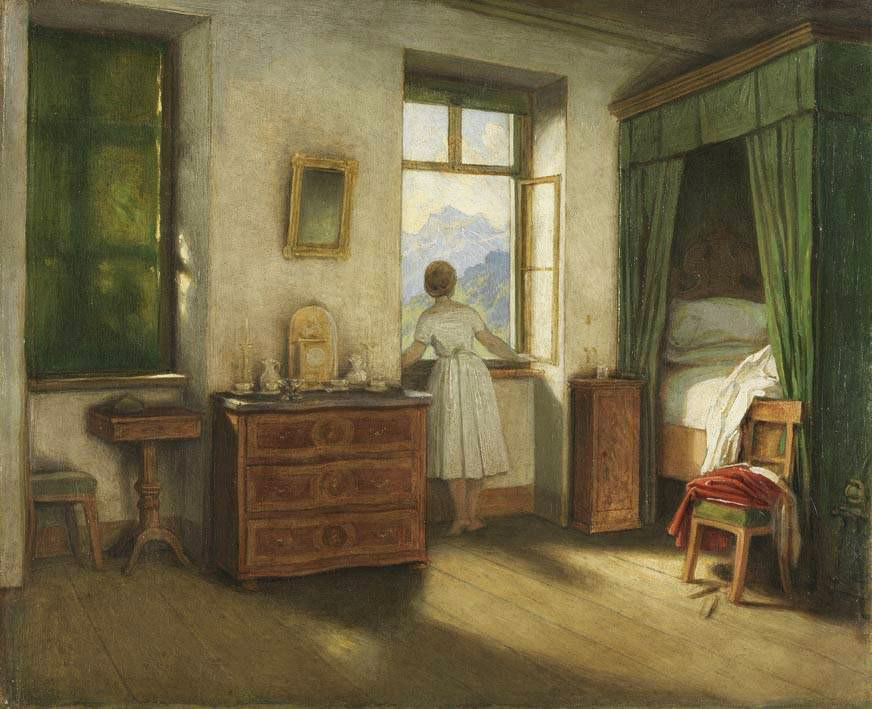
Moritz von Schwind —
Morgenstunde 1858

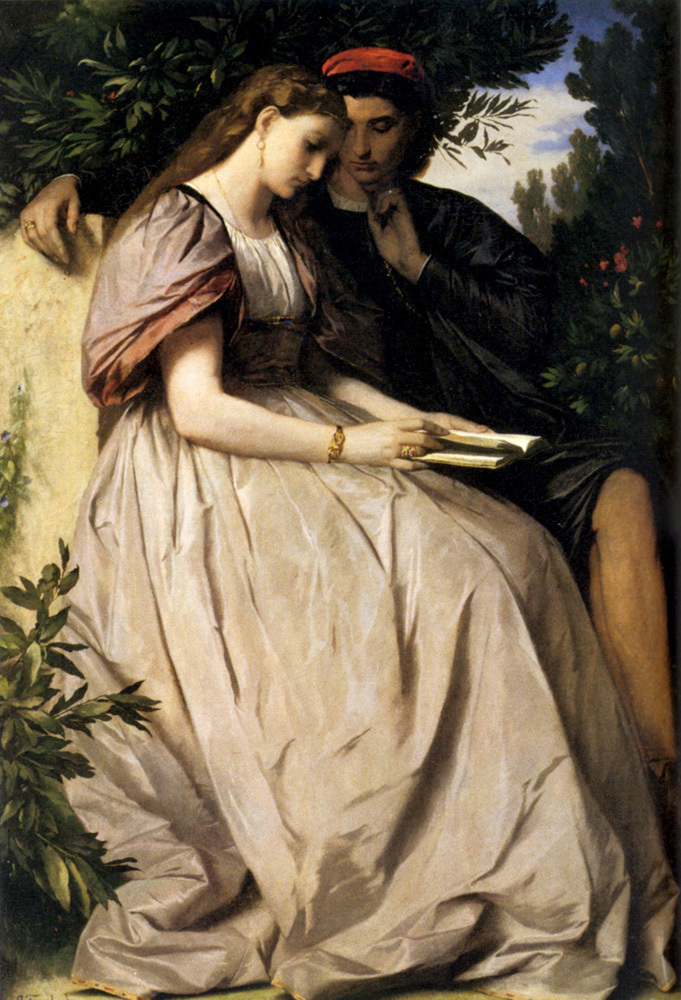
Anselm Feuerbach —
Paolo und Francesca 1864

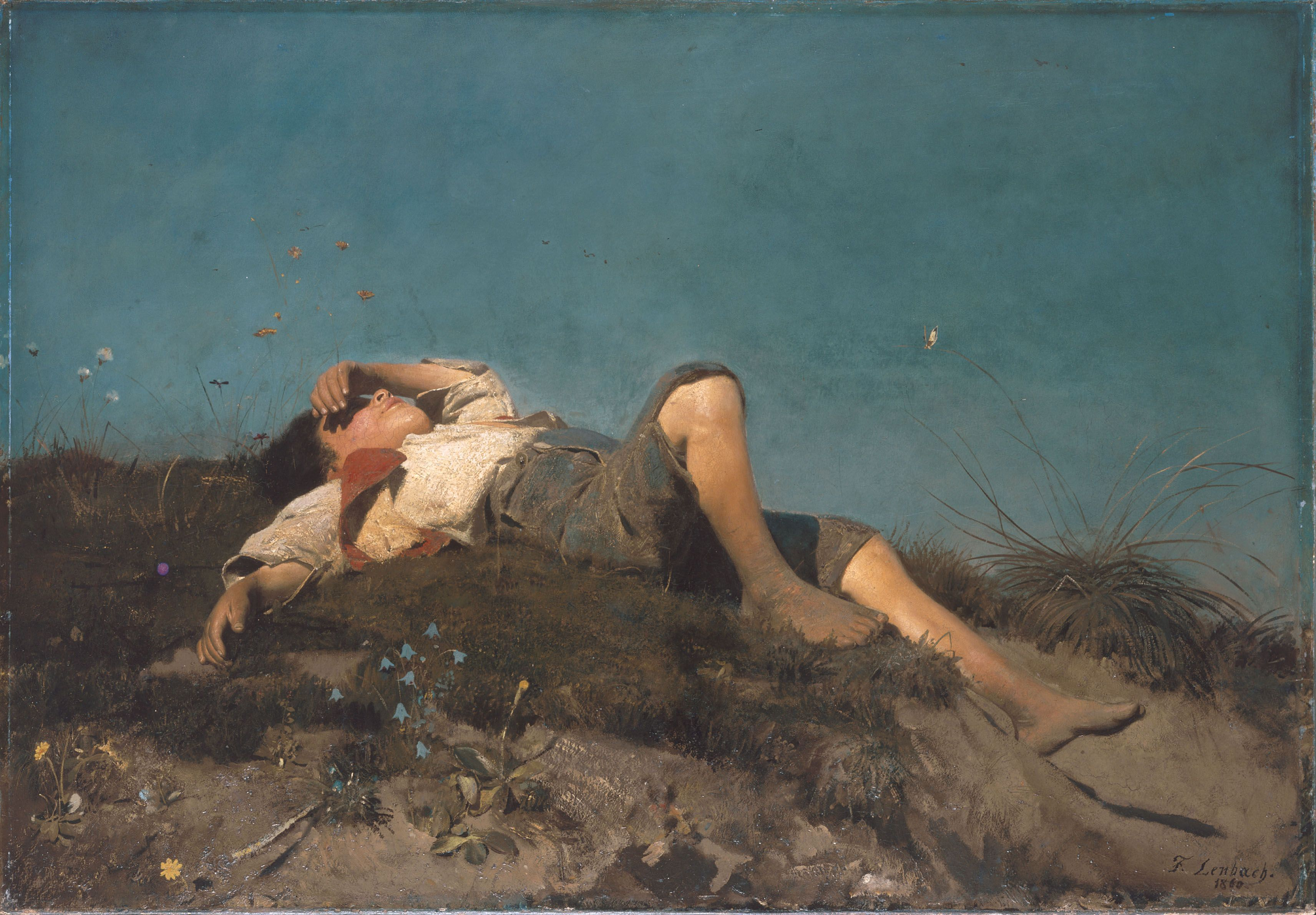
Franz von Lenbach —
Hirtenknabe 1860

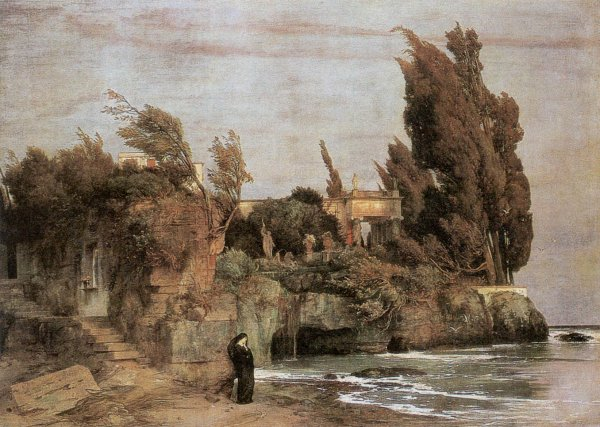
Arnold Böcklin —
Villa am Meer II 1865

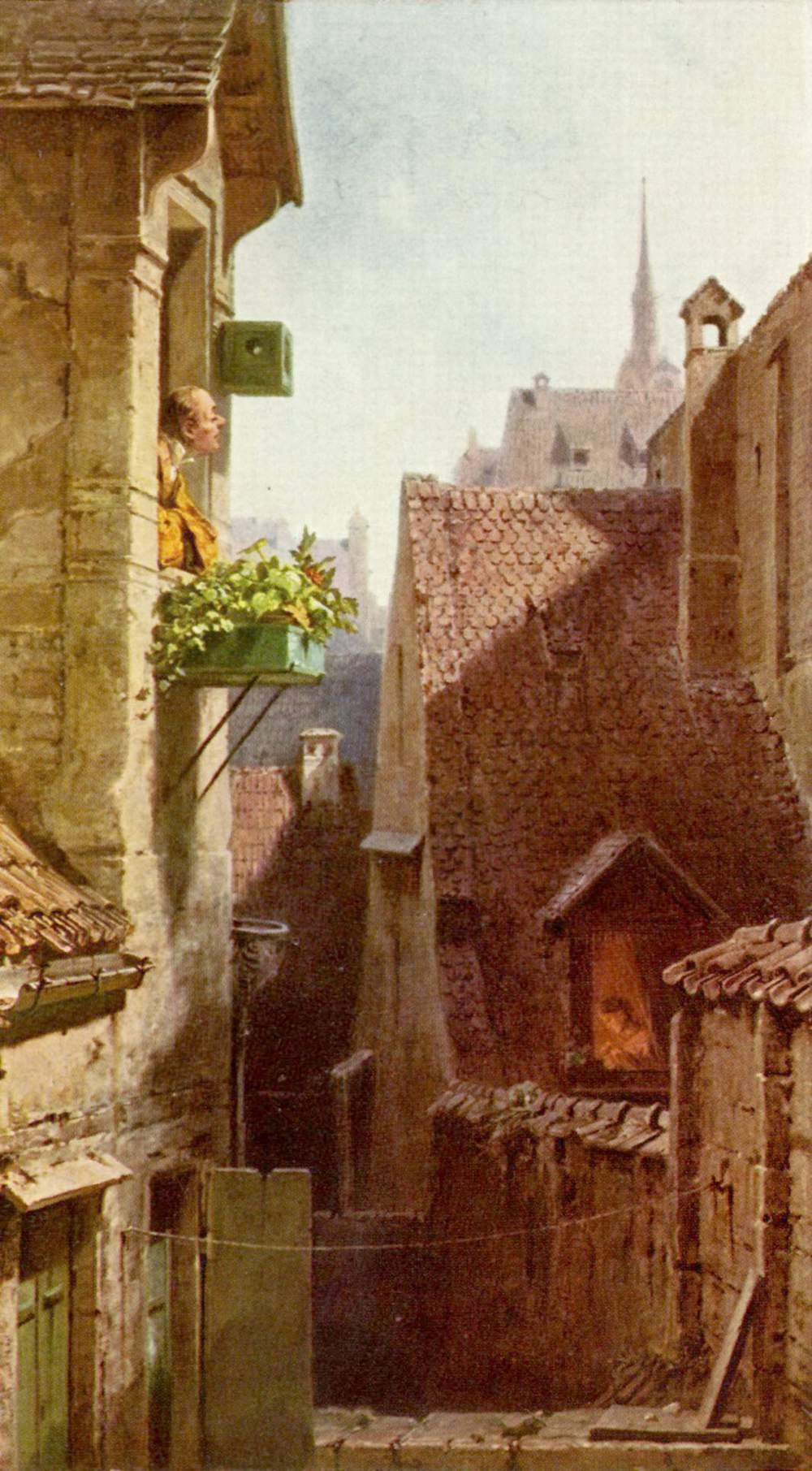
Carl Spitzweg —
Hypochonder um 1865
