= Osor Musical Evenings =

Croatian classical music festival

- Genre: Classical music, contemporary classical music, early music
- Dates: mid-July to late August
- Locations: Osor, Cres-Lošinj archipelago, Croatia
- Years active: 1976–present
- Founders: Daniel Marušić
- Website: www.osorfestival.eu

Osor Musical Evenings (Croatian: Osorske glazbene večeri) is a Croatian classical music festival that takes place in the historical town of Osor, on the island of Cres in the Kvarner Gulf. The festival was founded in 1976 by Daniel Marušić, a renowned Croatian TV and Opera director, who was its artistic and executive director until his death in 2009. The original idea behind the festival was to revive Osor during the summer, and to create a festival dedicated mostly to works by historical and contemporary Croatian composers. Although in the first decades festival held conferences, theater and opera productions and art exhibitions, today Osor Musical Evenings are oriented exclusively to musical programs, including classical and Contemporary classical music, and occasionally Early music and electronical music. The main concert hall is the late-15th century church of the Assumption of the Virgin Mary (the former cathedral of Osor), while other concert spaces are used, such as the main square in Osor and archeological site of St Peter church. For their outstanding contribution in the field of classical music in Croatia, the festival was declared national in 2011. The top notch musicians over the last several years include L'Arpeggiata and Christina Pluhar, Giovanni Sollima, Diana Haller, Renata Pokupić, Aleksandar Marković among others.

In the last 40 years around 300 new compositions were first performed in Osor, many of which were commissioned by the festival or dedicated to Osor. The major festival commission is Osor Trilogy: Osor Requiem (Boris Papandopulo, 1978), Osor Mystery (Boris Papandopulo, 1979), and Osor Cry (Berislav Šipuš, 2009) for soloists, mixed choir, and chamber orchestra. The first integral performance at the 37th Osor Musical evenings was recorded by Croatian Radiotelevision and was published as a triple DVD in 2013. First three decades of festival are well documented in a book by Dodi Komanov, Arkadija hrvatske glazbe: 30 godina festivala Osorske glazbene večeri (Arcady of Croatian music: 30 years of Osor Musical Evenings) published by the festival in 2006.
