= Symphony No. 4 (Mahler) =

Symphony by Gustav Mahler

- by Gustav Mahler
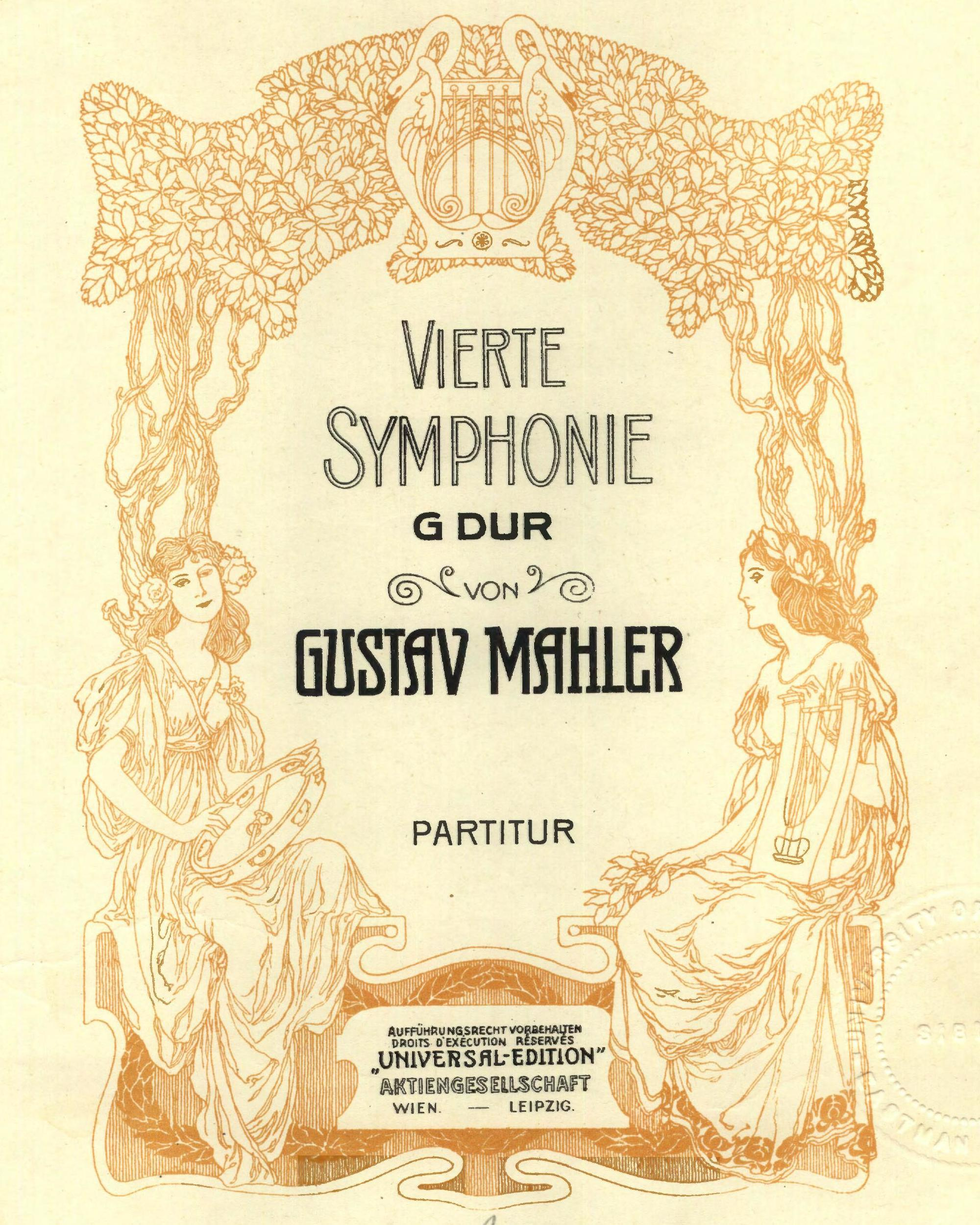
- Cover of the orchestral score, c. 1911
- Key: G major
- Composed: 1899–1900
- Published: 1902
- Movements: 4

Premiere
- Date: 25 November 1901
- Location: Munich
- Conductor: Gustav Mahler
- Performers: Kaim Orchestra; Margarete Michalek (soprano)

The Symphony No. 4 in G major by Gustav Mahler was composed from 1899 to 1900, though it incorporates a song originally written in 1892. That song, "Das himmlische Leben" ("The Heavenly Life"), presents a child's vision of heaven and is sung by a soprano in the symphony's Finale. Both smaller in orchestration and shorter in length than Mahler's earlier symphonies, the Fourth Symphony was initially planned to be in six movements, alternating between three instrumental and three vocal movements. The symphony's final form—begun in July 1899 at Bad Aussee and completed in August 1900 at Maiernigg—retains only one vocal movement (the Finale) and is in four movements: Bedächtig, nicht eilen (sonata form); In gemächlicher Bewegung, ohne Hast (scherzo and trio); Ruhevoll, poco adagio (double theme and variations); and Sehr behaglich (strophic variations).

The premiere was performed in Munich on 25 November 1901 by the composer and the Kaim Orchestra, but it was met with negative audience and critical reception over the work's confusing intentions and perceived inferiority to the more well-received Second Symphony. The premiere was followed by a German tour, a 1901 Berlin premiere, and a 1902 Vienna premiere, which were met with near-unanimous condemnation of the symphony. Mahler conducted further performances of the symphony, sometimes to warm receptions, and the work received its American and British premieres in 1904 and 1905. The symphony's first edition was published in 1902, but Mahler made several more revisions up until 1911. After Mahler's death, the symphony continued to receive performances under conductors such as Willem Mengelberg and Bruno Walter, and its first recording is a 1930 Japanese rendition conducted by Hidemaro Konoye that is also the first electrical recording of any Mahler symphony. The musicologist Donald Mitchell believed the Fourth and its accessibility were largely responsible for the post-war rise in Mahler's popularity.

The symphony uses cyclic form throughout its structure, such as in the anticipations of the Finale's main theme in the previous three movements. The first movement has been characterized as neoclassical in style, save for its complex development section. The second movement consists of scherzos depicting Death at his fiddle, which are contrasted with Ländler-like trios. The third movement's two themes are varied alternately before reaching a triple forte coda, and the Finale comprises verses from "Das himmlische Leben" sung in strophes that are separated by refrains of the first movement's opening. Certain themes and motifs in the Fourth Symphony are also found in Mahler's Second, Third, and Fifth Symphonies.

== History ==
=== Composition ===
Gustav Mahler's Fourth Symphony is the last of the composer's three Wunderhorn symphonies (the others being his Second and Third Symphonies). These works incorporated themes originating in Mahler's Des Knaben Wunderhorn (The Boy's Magic Horn), a song cycle setting poems from the folk poetry collection of the same name. The core of the Fourth Symphony is an earlier song, "Das himmlische Leben" ("The Heavenly Life"), set to text from Des Knaben Wunderhorn but not included in Mahler's song cycle. Mahler considered the song both the inspiration and goal of the Fourth Symphony, calling it the "tapering spire of the edifice." Fragments of it are heard in the first three movements before it is sung in its entirety by a solo soprano in the fourth movement.

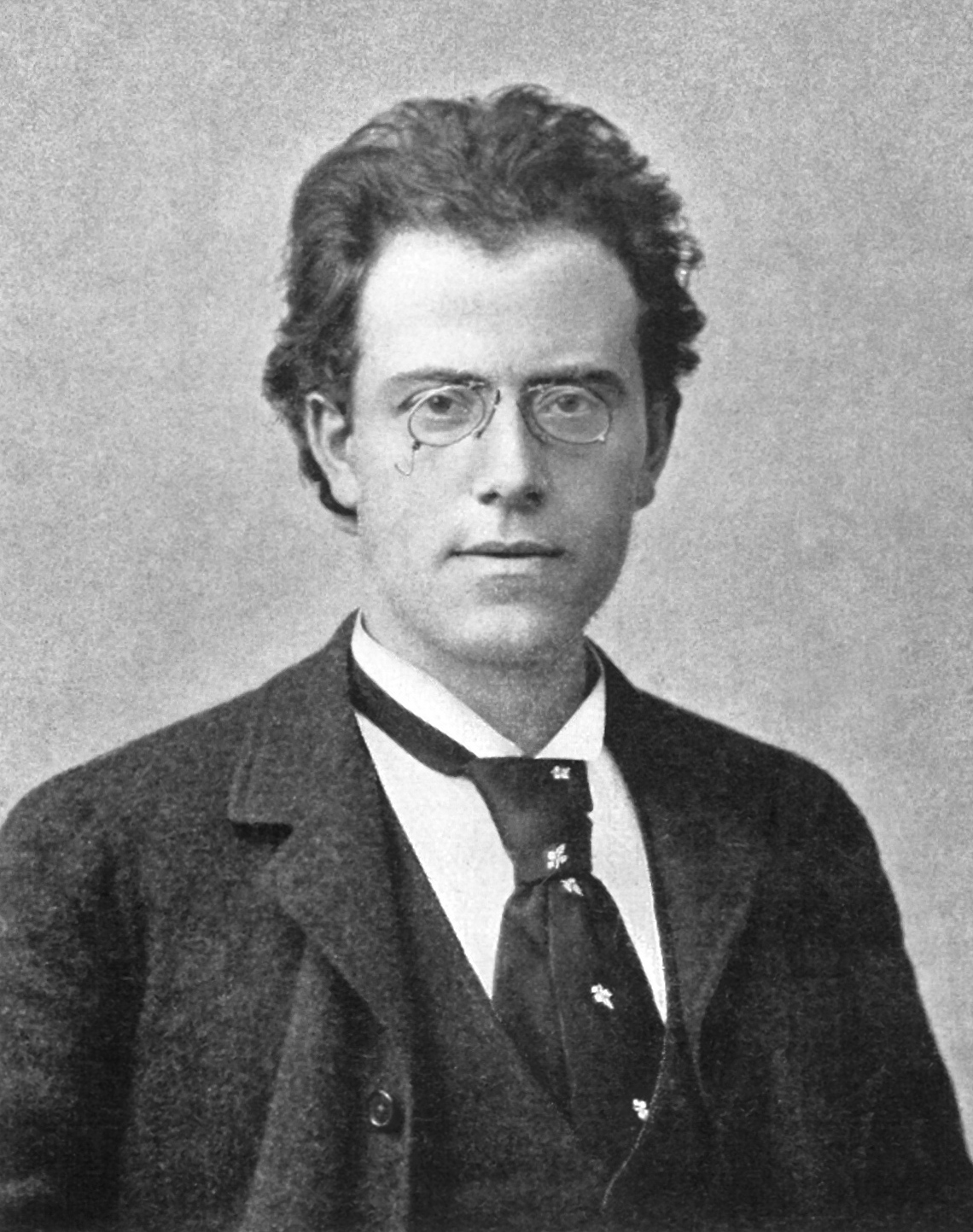
The composer in 1892, photographed by Leonhard Berlin-Bieber

Mahler completed "Das himmlische Leben" in 1892, (Note: The piano and voice score of "Das himmlische Leben" was completed on 10 February 1892, and the orchestra and voice score was completed on 12 March 1892.) as part of a collection of five Humoresken (Humoresques) for voice and orchestra. He adapted the text of "Das himmlische Leben" from the original Bavarian folk song "Der Himmel hängt voll Geigen" ("Heaven is Hung with Violins" or "The World through Rose-colored Glasses") in Des Knaben Wunderhorn. The poem describes scenes and characters from a child's vision of heaven. In 1895, Mahler considered using the song as the sixth and final movement of his Third Symphony. While remnants of "Das himmlische Leben" can be found in the Third Symphony's first, fourth, and fifth movements—including a quotation of the song in the fifth movement's "Es sungen drei Engel" ("Three Angels were Singing")—Mahler eventually decided to withdraw the song from the work. He instead opted to use the song as the finale of a new symphony, his Fourth. Consequently, there are particularly strong thematic and programmatic connections between the Third and the Fourth through "Das himmlische Leben", though the composer also realized that the Fourth was closely related to his First and Second Symphonies. In conversation with Natalie Bauer-Lechner in the summer of 1900, Mahler described the Fourth Symphony as the conclusion to the "perfectly self-contained tetralogy" of his first four symphonies: she later expanded on this to suggest that the First depicts heroic suffering and triumph; the Second explores death and resurrection; the Third contemplates existence and God; and the Fourth, as an extension of the Third's ideas, explores life in heaven.

According to Paul Bekker's 1921 synopsis of the symphony, Mahler made an early program sketch titled Sinfonie Nr. 4 (Humoreske) that has the following six-movement form: (Note: Bekker surmises that the Fourth Symphony's plans were made "almost at the same time" as the Third's (in the summer of 1895), but Constantin Floros believes the sketch's title of "Symphony No. 4" suggests it was made after the Third's completion (after the summer of 1896).)

1. Die Welt als ewige Jetztzeit (The World as Eternal Now) – G major
2. Das irdische Leben (The Earthly Life) – E♭ minor
3. Caritas – Adagio in B major
4. Morgenglocken (Morning Bells) – F major
5. Die Welt ohne Schwere (The World Without Gravity) – Scherzo in D major
6. Das himmlische Leben (The Heavenly Life) – G major (Note: Mahler originally labeled this movement with a duplicate Roman numeral "V", which James L. Zychowicz considers to be "a slip of the pen" in the six-movement plan.)

The sketch indicates that Mahler originally planned for the Fourth Symphony to have three purely symphonic movements (first, third, and fifth) and three orchestra songs: "Das irdische Leben" (composed c. 1893 as a Des Knaben Wunderhorn song), "Morgenglocken" (completed in 1895 as the Third Symphony's "Es sungen drei Engel"), and "Das himmlische Leben". However, the symphony would be modified until only the program sketch's first and last movements would be realized as their respective movements in the symphony's final form, (Note: Donald Mitchell regards "Die Welt als ewige Jetztzeit" as the "suppressed title" of the symphony's first movement, and Floros explains that the final version's Scherzo and Adagio movements do not correspond with the sketch's.) resulting in a Fourth Symphony of normal symphonic length (around 45 minutes) as opposed to the composer's significantly longer earlier symphonies.

During Mahler's 1899 summer vacation in Bad Aussee, the Fourth Symphony, in Bauer-Lechner's words, "fell into his lap just in the nick of time" in late July. The vacation served as Mahler's only chance during the entire year when he was free to compose, but his productivity heretofore was hindered by poor weather and listening to what he called "ghastly health-resort music". As the vacation neared its end, Mahler worked on the symphony for ten days, during which he drafted "about half" of the three instrumental movements and sketched the variations of the Adagio third movement, according to Bauer-Lechner. Mahler finished the Fourth during his summer vacation in Maiernigg the next year; following another bout of unproductivity that summer, Mahler eventually found his working rhythm and completed the symphony's Partiturentwurf (first full orchestral score) on 5 August 1900. (Note: Mitchell notes that Mahler originally inscribed 6 August 1900 at the end of the Adagio movement, but the composer's additional inscription of "Sunday" leads Mitchell to conclude that "it must have been the 5th" on which Mahler completed the symphony (the 6th was a Monday). Henry-Louis de La Grange also believes that the real date was "undoubtedly" 5 August.) The symphony's completion suddenly left Mahler feeling "empty and depressed because life has lost all meaning", and Bauer-Lechner reports that he was "deeply upset to have lost such an important part of his life" composing the work.

Later that year during the Christmas holidays, Mahler revised the Scherzo second movement, finalizing its orchestration on 5 January 1901. Though Mahler published his programs for the First and Second symphonies, he refrained from publishing a program for the Fourth. In the words of the musicologist James L. Zychowicz, Mahler intended for "the music to exist on its own." Mahler was also opposed to giving any titles for the symphony's movements, despite having "devised some marvelous ones", because he did not want critics and audiences to "misunderstand and distort them in the worst possible way."

=== Premiere ===
During the first half of 1901, Richard Strauss considered conducting the first complete performance of Mahler's Third Symphony. However, Strauss, unsure whether he had enough time to prepare the Third's premiere, wrote to Mahler on 3 July asking whether he could conduct the Fourth's premiere instead. Mahler responded that he had already promised the premiere to Munich, "where the Kaim Orchestra and the Odeon are having such a tug-of-war over it that I'm finding it hard to try to choose between them". The Vienna Philharmonic had also asked Mahler several times whether they could perform the symphony's premiere, but Mahler by then had promised the premiere to Felix Weingartner, head of the Kaim Orchestra. Not long after the exchanges with the Philharmonic, the composer asked for Weingartner's permission sometime in August or September 1901 to conduct the premiere himself, citing his anxiety over the symphony and its performance.

Eventually, it was planned for Mahler to conduct the Kaim Orchestra in Munich for the world premiere, after which Weingartner and the Kaim Orchestra would perform the work on tour in various German cities and Mahler himself would conduct another performance in Berlin. To review the symphony's orchestration before its publication, Mahler arranged a reading rehearsal with the Vienna Philharmonic on 12 October, which doubled as a rehearsal of the Vienna premiere scheduled for January the next year. Mahler was not satisfied with the results; he made corrections to the score and fully rehearsed the work four times before the symphony's premiere. Though the Munich premiere was originally planned for 18 November, Mahler requested in late October that Weingartner postpone the performance to 25 November, citing "insurmountable difficulties". He also opposed programming a vocal work to precede the symphony on the premiere's program, as he wanted the Finale's soprano "to come as a complete surprise". Henry-Louis de La Grange writes: "the Fourth Symphony had cost Mahler more toil and anguish than the monumental symphonies that had preceded it, and, notwithstanding he was apprehensive of the reactions of its first audience, he secretly hoped that its modest dimensions and the clarity of its style would finally win him the approval of both the public and the musicians".

The world premiere of the symphony was performed on 25 November 1901 in Munich at the Kaim-Saal, with Mahler conducting the Kaim Orchestra and soprano Margarete Michalek (Note: Michalek was one of Mahler's favorite singers when he was director of the Vienna Hofoper. La Grange believes "there is no convincing evidence to prove or disprove" the rumor that Mahler's interest in Michalek was "more than artistic".) (Note: Other works on the premiere's concert program included a Mozart Symphony in G major (either K. 74 or K. 129), Weingartner's orchestral work Wallfahrt nach Kevlaar, lieder by Brahms and Schumann, and Beethoven's Egmont Overture. Members of the audience included musicians Max von Schillings, Ludwig Thuille, Max Reger, Siegmund von Hausegger, and Felix vom Rath.) Bauer-Lechner writes that the first movement was met with both applause and boos since a number in the audience were "unable to follow the complexity of events in the development". The Scherzo proved more confusing to the audience and received further vocal derision. Michalek's performance in the Finale "saved the day"; her youth and charm was said to have "poured oil on the troubled waters". Despite this, the premiere left many in the audience incensed, as the Munich press reported. The Allgemeine Zeitung, though praising the first movement, described the symphony as "not readily accessible and, in any case, impossible to judge after only one hearing". It also criticized the work's "pretensions" and unjustified use of "the grotesquely comic" before accusing it of "[trespassing] against the Holy Spirit of music". The Münchener Zeitung and the Bayerischer Kurier both expressed disappointment when comparing Mahler's Fourth to what they considered his superior Second Symphony; the former described the Fourth to be a "succession of disjointed and heterogeneous atmospheres and expressions mixed with instrumental quirks and affectations" while the latter said the work was full of "incredible cacophony". Likewise, Die Musik claimed that "the bad seeds" in parts of the Second grew into "immense spiky thistles" in the Fourth. The symphony did find some praise in the Kleine Journal—which lauded the Finale as "quite simply a work of genius" despite calling the whole work "transparent, sensitive, almost hysterical"—and the Münchener Post, which hailed the symphony as "great step forward on the road to artistic clarity".

=== Subsequent performances and reception ===
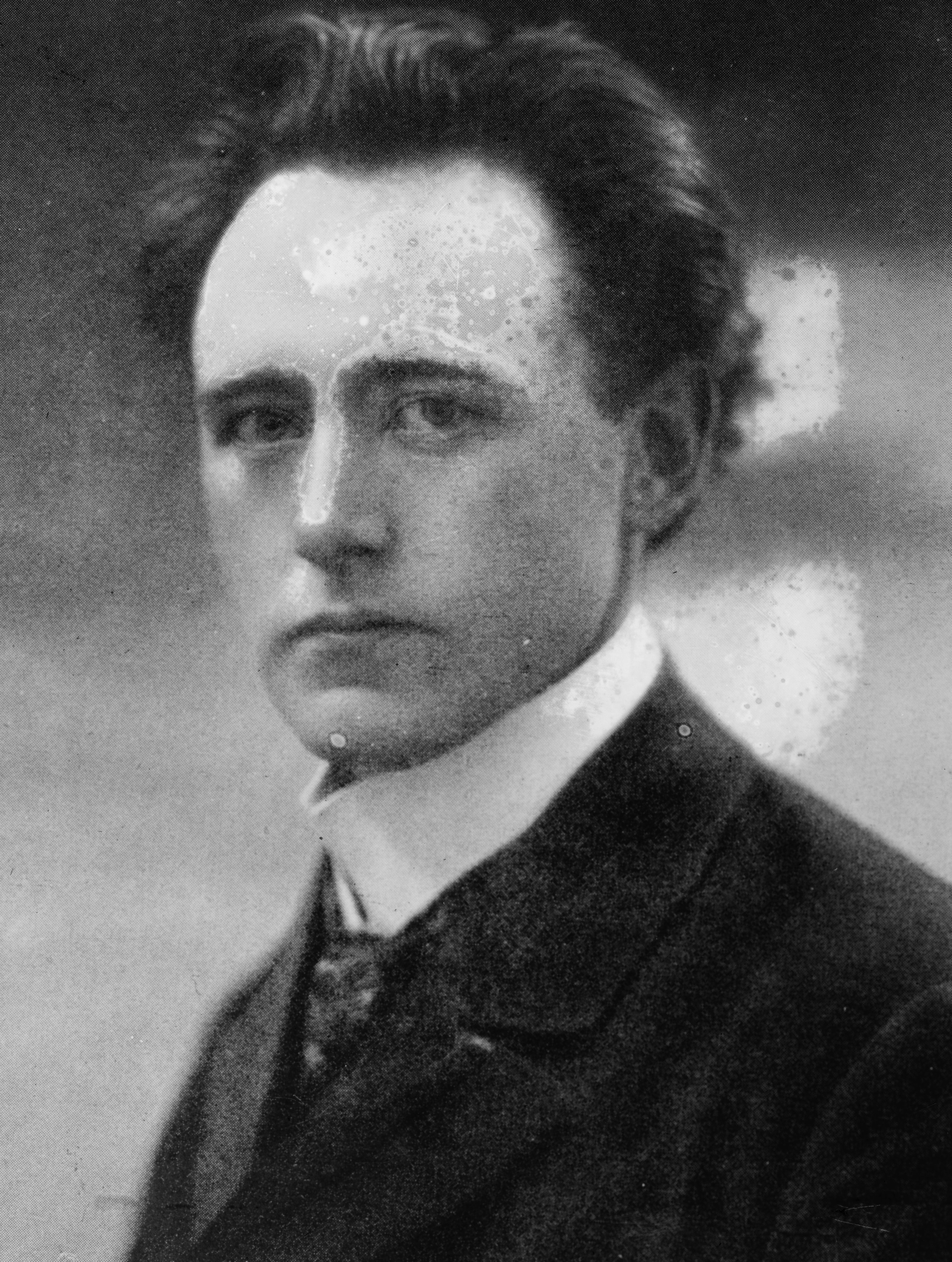
Felix Weingartner, who conducted the symphony during its 1901 German tour

Weingartner and the Kaim Orchestra's tour of the symphony, with Michalek as soloist, performed in Nuremberg (26 November 1901), Darmstadt (27 November), Frankfurt (28 November), Karlsruhe (29 November), and Stuttgart (30 November). (Note: Other works performed on the tour include Berlioz's King Lear Overture, Brahms's Fourth Symphony, and Beethoven's Egmont and Leonore No. 3 Overtures.) Most of the cities gave unanimously negative receptions towards the Fourth, with Stuttgart being the sole exception. A false report of a successful Munich premiere prompted some applause after the Nuremberg performance, but the city's General-Anzeiger gave a harsh review of Mahler's "Vaudeville-Symphony", praising only its orchestration. In Frankfurt, the audience's "angry and violent" hissing was likened to "the sound of an autumn wind blowing through the dead leaves and dried twigs of a forest" by the Musikalisches Wochenblatt. In Karlsruhe, the concert began with a near-empty audience, and Weingartner chose only to conduct the symphony's Finale. The Stuttgart press was mixed: the Schwäbischer Merkur praised Mahler as a rising star and considered the work a "wreath of good-humored melodies and folk dances"; on the other hand, the Neues Taggblatt condemned the symphony for its "vulgar passages". The tour's failure discouraged Mahler and traumatized Weingartner, who never conducted a piece by Mahler again.

The Berlin premiere was performed on 16 December 1901 at the Berlin Opera, with Mahler conducting the Berliner Tonkünstler Orchestra and Thila Plaichinger as soprano. The work's reception was hostile; La Grange writes that "the Berlin press took a malicious delight in tearing the new work to shreds", with negative reviews in the Berliner Börsen-Zeitung, Berliner Tageblatt, and Vossische Zeitung. Mahler also conducted for the Vienna premiere on 12 January 1902 at the Großer Musikvereinsaal, which was performed by the Vienna Philharmonic and Michalek. Once again, the reception was a near-unanimous condemnation of the symphony, including criticism from reviewers Max Kalbeck, Theodor Helm, Richard Heuberger, and Max Graf.

Mahler conducted a 23 January 1903 performance at the Kurhaus, Wiesbaden, where he was surprised by the friendly reception. That year later saw a performance in Düsseldorf. On 23 March 1904, the composer conducted the Fourth at the Staatstheater Mainz, which received warm applause but reviews criticizing the work's "naïveté". This was followed by a number of international performances. In 1904, Mahler traveled to Amsterdam to conduct a double performance of the symphony on 23 October at the Royal Concertgebouw with the Concertgebouw Orchestra and the soloist Alida Lütkemann. The American premiere on 6 November 1904 in New York City saw Walter Damrosch conduct the New York Symphony Society and the soprano Etta de Montjau. The British premiere on 25 October 1905 was a Prom concert given by Henry Wood, who conducted the New Queen's Hall Orchestra and his wife, Olga Wood, as soprano. Mahler conducted another performance on 18 January 1907, this time in Frankfurt's Saalbau. Mahler's last performances of the symphony were with the New York Philharmonic and the soprano Bella Alten in Carnegie Hall on 17 and 20 January 1911.

In the Amsterdam Mahler Festival of May 1920, the Concertgebouw Orchestra under Willem Mengelberg's direction performed nine concerts during which Mahler's complete opus was played for the first time. Mahler's protégé Bruno Walter conducted the symphony in Moscow in 1923, but he had to convince the concert's Russian organizers not to alter the religious references in "Das himmlische Leben". During the 1940s, the Fourth received performances from the London Philharmonic Orchestra conducted by Anatole Fistoulari and the BBC Symphony Orchestra conducted by Adrian Boult, contributing to what Donald Mitchell calls "the Mahler 'boom' in England".

Despite Mahler's contemporaries' negative criticism, Mitchell believes that the Fourth "above all [was] the agent of changed attitudes to Mahler in the years after the Second World War" because its relatively modest resources and length, its approachability, and its appeal eventually won "admiring audiences". In 1973, Kurt Blaukopf stated that of Mahler's symphonies, the Fourth "became popular most quickly". In 2005, Zychowicz wrote that the Fourth, in which the composer was "uncannily concise", remains one of Mahler's most accessible compositions.

== Instrumentation ==
The symphony is scored for a smaller orchestra compared to Mahler's other symphonies, and there are no parts for trombone or tuba. Paul Stefan notes the "fairly numerous" woodwinds and strings, while Michael Steinberg calls the percussion section "lavish". The instrumentation is as follows:

Woodwinds

4 flutes (3rd and 4th doubling piccolos)
3 oboes (3rd doubling cor anglais)
3 B♭, A, C clarinets (2nd doubling E♭ clarinet, 3rd doubling bass clarinet)
3 bassoons (3rd doubling contrabassoon)
Brass
4 horns
3 trumpets

Percussion
4 timpani
bass drum
cymbals
triangle
sleigh bells
tam-tam
glockenspiel

Voices
soprano solo (used only in fourth movement)

Strings
harp
1st violins
2nd violins
violas
cellos
double basses

== Structure ==
I. Bedächtig, nicht eilen

II. In gemächlicher Bewegung, ohne Hast

III. Ruhevoll

IV. Sehr behaglich
Recordings from Musopen

Although Mahler described the symphony's key as G major, the work employs a progressive tonal scheme of B minor/G major to E major, as classified in The New Grove Dictionary of Music and Musicians. The symphony is in four movements:

1. Bedächtig, nicht eilen (deliberate, unhurried) – Sonata form in G major
2. In gemächlicher Bewegung, ohne Hast (moving comfortably, unhurried) – Scherzo in C minor with two trios in F major
3. Ruhevoll, poco adagio (calm, somewhat slowly) – double theme and variations in G Major (first theme) and E minor (second theme)
4. Sehr behaglich (at ease) – Strophic variations beginning in G major and ending in E major

Mahler attempted to unify the four movements through cyclic form, linking movements by reusing themes such as that of the bells from the first movement's opening and "Das himmlische Leben" from the last movement.

Deryck Cooke estimates the symphony's duration to be 50 minutes, a moderate length for a symphony that Mahler considered to be "of normal dimensions". La Grange gives the following movement durations based on Mahler's 1904 Amsterdam performance, which took a longer 57 minutes:

1. Bedächtig, nicht eilen – 20 minutes
2. In gemächlicher Bewegung, ohne Hast – 8 minutes
3. Ruhevoll, poco adagio – 19 minutes
4. Sehr behaglich – 9 1/2 to 10 minutes

=== I. Bedächtig, nicht eilen ===
Cooke characterizes the first movement as a "pastoral 'walk through the countryside' movement", and it is one of Mahler's shortest first movements. The introduction in B minor is played by flutes and sleigh bells:

The first theme in G major is then heard, marked Recht gemächlich (very leisurely):

Constantin Floros calls the first theme "remarkably short", and Theodor Adorno notices a Schubert-like sound in it. La Grange compares the first theme to a similar passage in the first movement exposition of Schubert's Piano Sonata in E♭ major, D. 568. The second theme is in D major, marked Breit gesungen (broadly sung):

Floros identifies a similarity between this theme and a theme from the first movement of Beethoven's Piano Sonata No. 13. The exposition closes with a coda marked Wieder sehr ruhig (very calm again). Mitchell finds that the themes, textures, and rhythms of the exposition suggest Neoclassicism, but Mahler's style changes in the ensuing development section when "a radically different sound-world manifests itself".

Floros comments on the development's "extraordinary complexity" in his analysis; he divides the development into eight parts, some of which explore distant minor keys and distort the main theme from the Finale. The development climaxes in its eighth part on a dissonant fortissimo followed by a trumpet fanfare that Mahler named "Der kleine Appel" ("The little summons" or "The little call to order"); he later used this trumpet call as the opening theme to the Fifth Symphony. The recapitulation section reaches what Stefan describes as "an almost Mozartian jubilation" towards its end, and the movement concludes with a calm and slow coda.

=== II. In gemächlicher Bewegung, ohne Hast ===
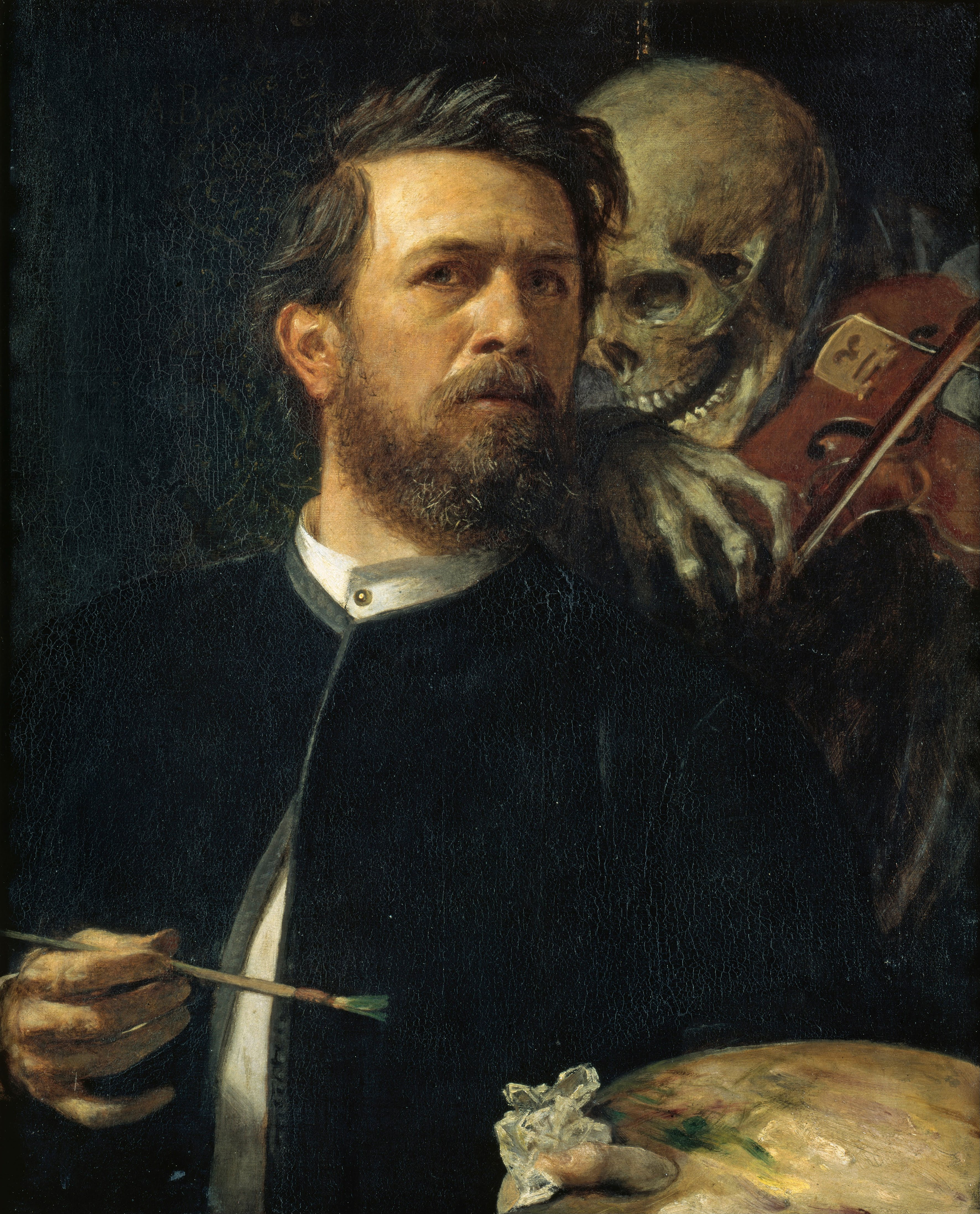
Self-Portrait with Death Playing the Fiddle by Arnold Böcklin, the inspiration for the scherzo

The second movement has a five-part structure, beginning with a scherzo part in C minor that alternates with a trio part in F major. The scherzo's prelude presents a horn call, followed by what Stefan terms a "ghostly theme" in a solo scordatura violin that begins the scherzo's first section in C minor.

A brighter middle section in C major is then heard, before a reprisal of the C minor section. The scherzo closes with a horn postlude. The two trios between the movement's three scherzos have the character of a Ländler and are in a "lazily cheerful" style that contrasts with the scherzo's grotesqueness. La Grange describes the second movement as Mahler's "only true ländler movement" since the First Symphony's Scherzo. Floros finds that certain melodies in the trio anticipate themes from the Finale.

The scherzo was originally named "Freund Hein spielt auf" ("Friend Hein Strikes Up", or "Death takes the fiddle" as paraphrased by Cooke). Freund Hein is a personification of Death in German folklore, and his fiddling is represented in the music by the harsh sound of the scordatura violin. (Note: During the 12 October 1901 rehearsal with the Vienna Philharmonic, Mahler was not satisfied with the violin's sound and delegated the "fiddle" part to a solo viola, still played by the Philharmonic's leader Arnold Rosé. Mahler reversed this decision for the 1904 Dutch premiere in Amsterdam, which apparently used a violin with normal tuning. The present score calls for a scordatura violin.) The printed program for the 1904 Amsterdam performance even included the title "Totentanz" ("Dance of Death") for the movement, though this was never published in the symphony's first edition. According to Mahler's widow, Alma, the composer took inspiration for this movement from the 1872 painting Self-Portrait with Death Playing the Fiddle by the Swiss artist Arnold Böcklin. Blaukopf writes that the violin passages betray "Mahler's penchant for the ludicrous and the eerie". Despite this, he notes that Freund Hein "is not frightening in effect" but is instead "uncanny". Stefan characterizes Mahler's depiction of Death as "very good-natured".

=== III. Ruhevoll, poco adagio ===
The third movement is an adagio set of double theme and variations. La Grange however believes that this "variations on two themes" interpretation of the movement (Note: Floros writes that the double theme and variation classification of the third movement was first used by Paul Stefan in his 1920 study of Gustav Mahler.) is inaccurate because the second theme is "not genuinely 'varied', but only amplified when restated". Mahler called the movement his "first real variations", and he composed it under the inspiration of "a vision of a tombstone on which was carved an image of the departed, with folded arms, in eternal sleep". The musicologist Philip Barford deems the music to be "of profound, meditative beauty".

Floros divides the movement into five main parts (A – B – A^{1} – B^{1} – A^{2}) followed by a coda. The first theme in G major is played in the beginning of part A by the cellos:

Wagner's bell motif from his opera "Parsifal"

The bass ostinato at the end of the A section of which resembles to the bell motif from Wagner's "Parsifal".

The coda of the movement (according to Floros), with the triple forte introduction which he calls the "most splendid" passage of the symphony.

Cooke calls the opening "a transfigured cradle song". Floros views part A's structure as bar form (two Stollen—the first theme followed by its variation—and an Abgesang) with an Appendix. (Note: In La Grange's analysis, part A is instead divided into three "periods", with the last period corresponding to the Appendix in Floros's analysis.) Part A closes with a bass motif, which both Bekker and Floros find "bell-like"; to the latter, the motif is reminiscent of the bell motif from Wagner's Parsifal. La Grange writes that the ostinato bass motif is "always present in some form or other" and gives the movement "a strong passacaglia feeling". Part B, marked Viel langsamer (much slower), is in three sections and also resembles the bar form structure. In the first section, the oboe introduces the lamenting E minor second theme, which is varied in the second section that climaxes in a fortissimo. Part B's final section, an Abgesang, is described by Floros as "symbolic of deepest mourning".

Part A^{1} is a variation of part A marked Anmutig bewegt (graceful and lively), and Floros describes part B^{1} as "a very free" and far more intense variation of part B. La Grange identifies part A^{2} as the "first variation proper" of part A; the first theme undergoes four variations of increasing tempo, reaching Allegro molto before a sudden return to Andante. Part A^{2} concludes with a variation of part A's Abgesang that fades away into the coda.

Floros refers to the coda's introduction as "the most splendid passage ... of the entire Symphony". A triple forte E major chord is played by the winds and strings, and the bass motif is reprised by the timpani and double basses. The horns and trumpets then play the main theme of the Finale before the volume rapidly decreases. (Note: La Grange's analysis does not consider this section (mm. 315–325), from the triple forte to the main theme in the brass, as part of the coda.) As the music slows down and dies away, the movement's final passage includes what Zychowicz calls the Ewigkeit (eternity) motif, which Mahler first used in the Finale of his Second Symphony.

=== IV. Sehr behaglich ===
La Grange analyzes the fourth movement as a strophic durchkomponiert in three main sections (Note: La Grange's three "sections" are analogous to Floros's first three "verses" and Zychowicz's first three "strophes" in their respective analyses.) separated by orchestral refrains and ending with a coda. An orchestral prelude in G major begins the Finale:

The soprano then sings the first verse or strophe of "Das himmlische Leben", beginning with the movement's main theme over "Wir genießen die himmlischen Freuden" (We revel in heavenly pleasures):

The verse is sung "with childishly gay expression" over text describing the joys of heaven. It closes with a suddenly slower choralelike figure over "Sankt Peter im Himmel sieht zu" (Saint Peter in Heaven looks on), leading into a lively orchestral interlude that reprises the bell opening from the first movement. A contrasting verse (second strophe) depicts a heavenly feast and is sung in E minor; this verse closes with another choralelike figure before the bell refrain returns for the interlude. The third strophe (comprising the third and fourth verses of the text) is in G major again and is sung over a variation of the first strophe's theme and form. After the bell refrain is played once more, the coda's pastoral introduction in E major is heard. This orchestral passage is marked Sehr zart und geheimnisvoll bis zum Schluß (very gentle and mysterious until the end), and the final strophe that follows is sung in E major over a variation of the main theme. This strophe corresponds to the text's final verse with images of "most gentle restfulness", and Mitchell calls it "an extraordinary experience without parallel elsewhere in Mahler". The coda ends on an orchestral postlude in pianissimo that gradually fades away. Adorno finds that there is an ambiguity as to whether the music and its heavenly vision has "fallen asleep for ever", and David Schiff interprets the Finale's depiction of Heaven as "untouchable, outside experience". Both agree that the Finale's promises of joy are present yet unattainable.

== Fourth movement text ==
"Das himmlische Leben"
(aus Des Knaben Wunderhorn)

Wir genießen die himmlischen Freuden,
D'rum tun wir das Irdische meiden.
Kein weltlich' Getümmel
Hört man nicht im Himmel!
Lebt alles in sanftester Ruh'!
Wir führen ein englisches Leben!
Sind dennoch ganz lustig daneben!
Wir tanzen und springen,
Wir hüpfen und singen!
Sankt Peter im Himmel sieht zu!

Johannes das Lämmlein auslasset,
Der Metzger Herodes d'rauf passet!
Wir führen ein geduldig's,
Unschuldig's, geduldig's,
Ein liebliches Lämmlein zu Tod!
Sankt Lucas den Ochsen tät schlachten
Ohn' einig's Bedenken und Achten;
Der Wein kost' kein Heller
Im himmlischen Keller;
Die Englein, die backen das Brot.

Gut' Kräuter von allerhand Arten,
Die wachsen im himmlischen Garten!
Gut' Spargel, Fisolen
Und was wir nur wollen,
Ganze Schüsseln voll sind uns bereit!
Gut' Äpfel, gut' Birn' und gut' Trauben;
Die Gärtner, die alles erlauben!
Willst Rehbock, willst Hasen?
Auf offener Straßen
Sie laufen herbei!

Sollt' ein Fasttag etwa kommen,
Alle Fische gleich mit Freuden
angeschwommen!
Dort läuft schon Sankt Peter
Mit Netz und mit Köder,
Zum himmlischen Weiher hinein. (Note: Mahler here omitted the following four lines of the original poem: "Willst Karpfen, willst Hecht, willst Forellen / Gut Stockfisch und frische Sardellen? / Sankt Lorenz hat müssen / Sein Leben einbüßen" ("Would you like carp, hake, or trout / Good dried fish, or sardines? / Saint Lawrence had / To forfeit his life").)
Sankt Martha die Köchin muß sein!

Kein' Musik ist ja nicht auf Erden,
Die unsrer verglichen kann werden.
Elftausend Jungfrauen
Zu tanzen sich trauen!
Sankt Ursula selbst dazu lacht!
Cäcilia mit ihren Verwandten
Sind treffliche Hofmusikanten!
Die englischen Stimmen
Ermuntern die Sinnen!
Daß alles für Freuden erwacht.

Translation:

"The Heavenly Life"
(from Des Knaben Wunderhorn, translated by Deryck Cooke)

We revel in heavenly pleasures,
Leaving all that is earthly behind us.
No worldly turmoil
Is heard in heaven;
We all live in sweetest peace.
We lead an angelic existence,
And so we are perfectly happy.
We dance and leap,
And skip and sing;
Saint Peter in Heaven looks on.

Saint John has lost his lambkin,
And butcher Herod is lurking:
We lead a patient,
Guiltless, patient,
Darling lambkin to death.
Saint Luke is slaying the oxen,
Without the least hesitation;
Wine costs not a farthing
In the Heavenly tavern;
The angels bake the bread.

Fine sprouts of every description,
Are growing in Heaven's garden.
Fine asparagus, fine herbs,
And all we desire,
Huge platefuls for us are prepared.
Fine apples, fine pears and fine grapes,
The gardeners let us pick freely.
You want venison, hare?
In the open streets
They go running around.

And when there's a holiday near,
All the fishes come joyfully
swimming;
And off runs Saint Peter
With net and with bait,
Towards the celestial pond.
Saint Martha will have to be cook!

There's no music at all on the earth
Which can ever compare with ours.
Eleven thousand virgins
Are set dancing.
Saint Ursula herself laughs to see it!
Cecilia with her companions
Are splendid court musicians.
The angelic voices
Delight the senses,
For all things awake to joy.

== Revisions and publication ==
Following the 1901 world premiere, Mahler revised the symphony a number of times, including changes in instrumentation, dynamics, and articulation for Julius Buths (c. 1903); revisions for a 3 November 1905 performance in Graz; changes made in the summer of 1910; and Mahler's last autographed revisions in 1911, made after his final performances of the symphony in New York.

The symphony's first edition was published in 1902 by Ludwig Doblinger of Vienna as a quarto score. The symphony was later taken up by the Vienna publisher Universal Edition, which reprinted the score in octavo format (c. 1905). Universal Edition published a subsequent edition in 1906, incorporating Mahler's early revisions, and reprinted this edition in 1910 and 1925. However, Universal Edition failed to carry out any of Mahler's further changes since the 1906 edition. Publishing rights of some of the symphony's editions were later transferred to Boosey & Hawkes, but their 1943 edition also failed to include the final revisions. Universal Edition eventually published a new edition in 1963, which saw Erwin Ratz incorporate Mahler's yet unincluded revisions. These changes were met with criticism from Hans Redlich, who wrote in 1966: "Only the musical texts of the Symphony published between 1902 and 1910 carry full authenticity for posterity."

Josef Venantius von Wöss arranged the symphony for four-hands piano, a version which was on sale at the time of the symphony's first publishing. Erwin Stein's 1921 and Klaus Simon's 2007 arrangements both call for a reduced orchestration, though the former is scored for a smaller ensemble than the latter since Stein omits the bassoon and horn parts.

== Recordings ==
The Fourth Symphony was first commercially recorded on 28 and 29 May 1930, with Hidemaro Konoye conducting the New Symphony Orchestra of Tokyo and the soprano Sakaye Kitasaya. The recording was released under Japanese Parlophone and is the first electrical recording of any Mahler symphony. Since then, the symphony has been recorded by ensembles in Europe, the United States, and Japan, including multiple recordings each from the New York Philharmonic, the Vienna Philharmonic, and the Concertgebouw Orchestra. In his 2020 Gramophone review of Fourth Symphony recordings, David Gutman selects Iván Fischer (2008), Willem Mengelberg (1939), Lorin Maazel (1983), and Claudio Abbado's (2009) interpretations of the symphony for his choice recordings, while also sampling recordings conducted by Simon Rattle (1997), Leonard Bernstein (1960), Otto Klemperer (1961), and Michael Tilson Thomas (2003).
