= Plague (painting) =

Painting by Arnold Böcklin

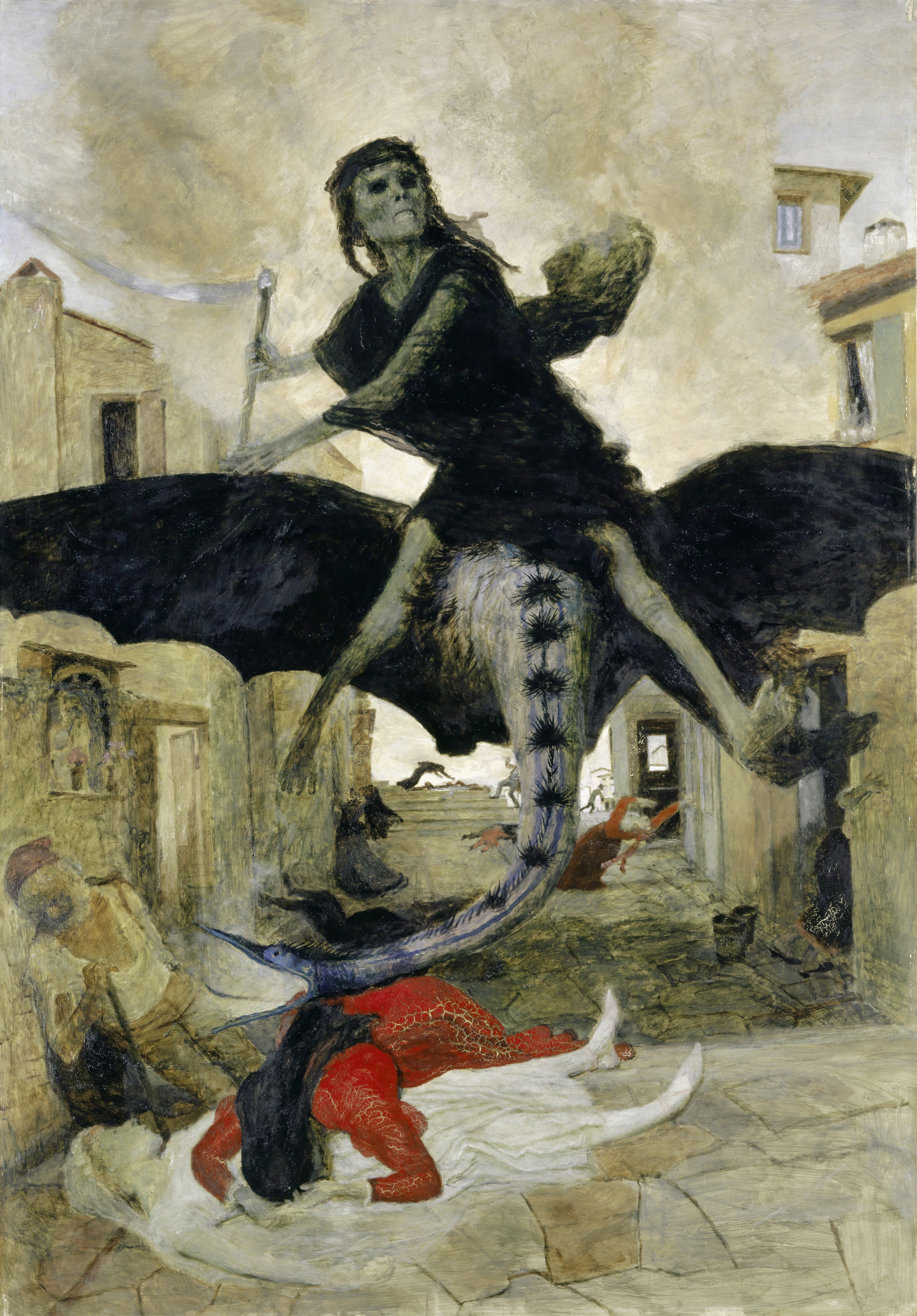
- Artist: Arnold Böcklin
- Year: 1898
- Type: Tempera on wood
- Dimensions: 149.8 cm × 105.1 cm (59.0 in × 41.4 in)
- Location: Kunstmuseum Basel, Basel

Plague is an 1898 painting in tempera by the Swiss symbolist artist Arnold Böcklin (1827 – 1901), held in the Kunstmuseum Basel. It exemplifies the artist's obsession with nightmares of war, pestilence and death. The painting shows Death riding on a bat-like winged creature who travels through a street in a medieval European town.

Plague is rendered mostly using shades of pale green, a colour often associated with decomposition. The other predominant tones are black and dull browns; for example, in the clothes worn by the figures shown in the mid-ground and background as they dive for safety before Death's path. The red cloth of the woman shown in the mid-foreground is the only vivid colour seen; she lies across the corpse of a woman who was also cut down.

== See also ==
- List of paintings by Arnold Böcklin

== Sources ==
- Eco, Umberto. On Ugliness. Rizzoli, 2007. ISBN 0-8478-2986-3
