= Roger Freeing Angelica =

Roger Freeing Angelica may refer to:

- Roger Freeing Angelica (Böcklin), a painting by Arnold Böcklin
- Roger Freeing Angelica (Ingres), an 1819 painting by Jean-Auguste-Dominique Ingres
