= Arnold Böcklin =

Swiss Symbolist painter (1827–1901)

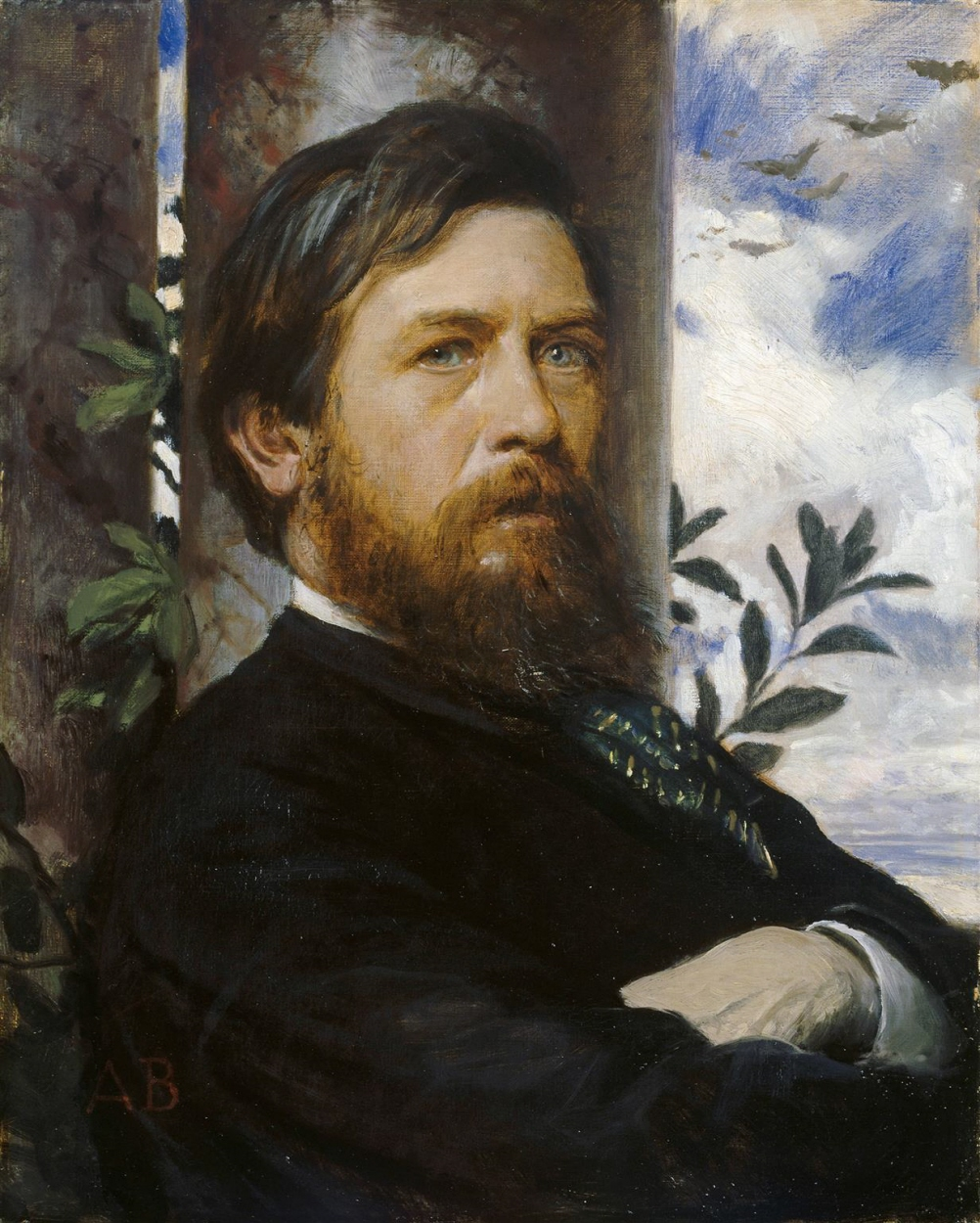
- Self-portrait (1873)
- Born: 16 October 1827; Basel, Switzerland
- Died: 16 January 1901 (aged 73); Fiesole, Italy
- Resting place: Cimitero degli Allori, Florence
- Known for: Painting
- Notable work: Isle of the Dead
- Movement: Symbolism

Arnold Böcklin ([ˈaʁnɔlt ˈbœklin]; 16 October 1827 – 16 January 1901) was a Swiss Symbolist painter. His five versions of the Isle of the Dead inspired works by several late Romantic composers.

== Biography ==
Arnold Böcklin was born in Basel. His father, Christian Frederick Böcklin (b. 1802), was descended from an old family of Schaffhausen, and engaged in the silk trade. His mother, Ursula Lippe, was a native of the same city. Arnold studied at the Düsseldorf academy under Schirmer, and became a friend of Anselm Feuerbach. He is associated with the Düsseldorf school of painting. Schirmer, who recognized in him a student of exceptional promise, sent him to Antwerp and Brussels, where he copied the works of Flemish and Dutch masters. Böcklin then went to Paris, worked at the Louvre, and painted several landscapes.

After serving his time in the army, Böcklin set out for Rome in March 1850. The many sights of Rome were a fresh stimulus to his mind. These new influences brought allegorical and mythological figures into his compositions. In 1856 he returned to Munich, and remained there for four years.

His first fiancée died young. A second woman declined to marry. In Rome, he married Angela Rosa Lorenza Pascucci in 1853. The couple had fourteen children, but five died in childhood and another three died before Böcklin. He himself nearly succumbed to typhoid in 1859.

== Career ==
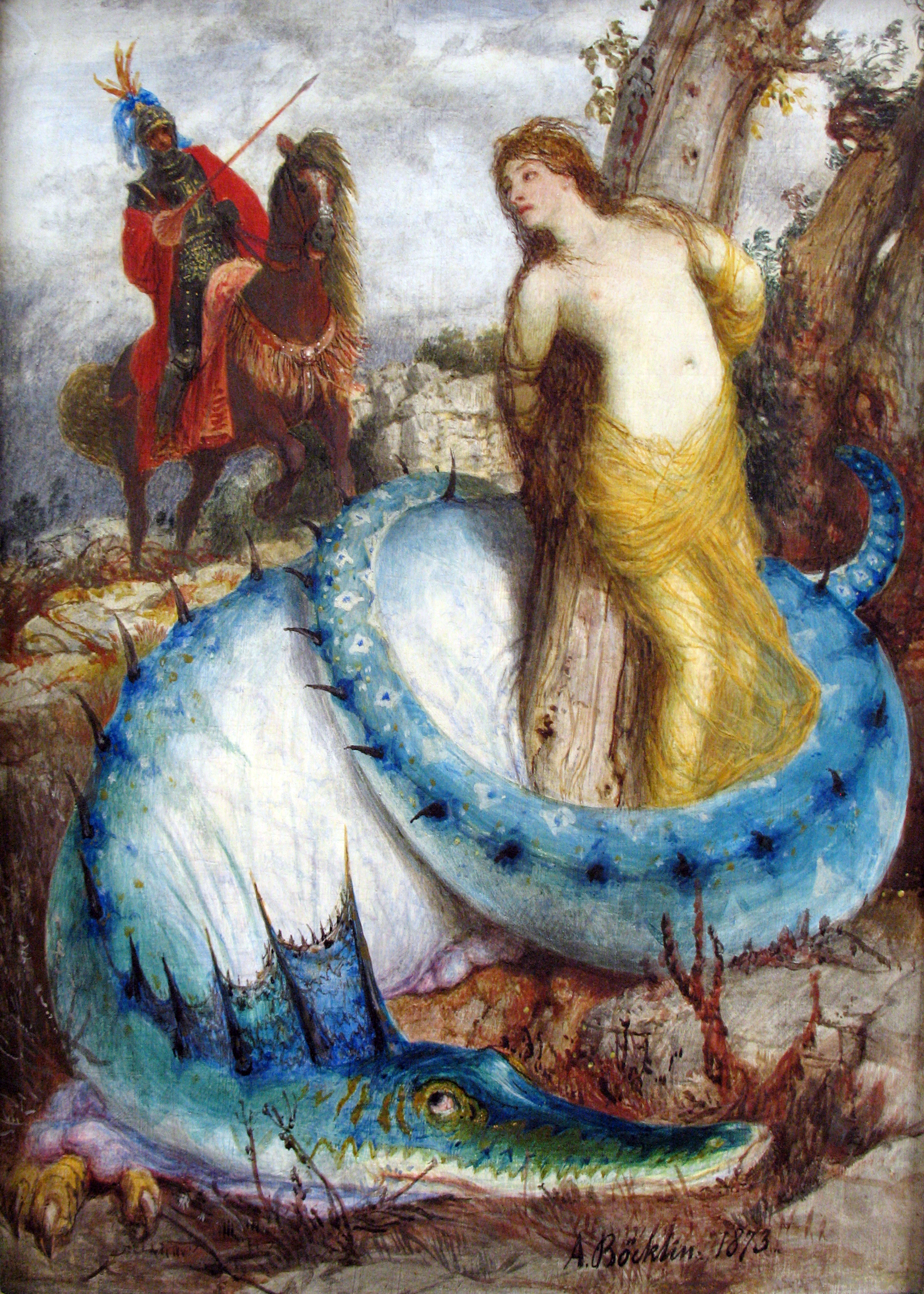
Roger Freeing Angelica, 1873

He then exhibited the Great Park, one of his earliest works, in which he treated ancient mythology. Of this period are his Nymph and Satyr, Heroic Landscape (Diana Hunting), both of 1858, and Sappho (1859). These works, which were much discussed, together with Lenbach's recommendation, gained him appointment as professor at the Weimar academy. He held the office for two years, painting the Venus and Love, a Portrait of Lenbach, and a Saint Catherine.

He returned to Rome from 1862 to 1866, and there gave his fancy and his taste for violent colour free play in his Portrait of Mme Böcklin, and in An Anchorite in the Wilderness (1863), a Roman Tavern, and Villa on the Seashore (1864). He returned to Basel in 1866 to finish his frescoes in the gallery, and to paint, besides several portraits, The Magdalene with Christ (1868), Anacreon's Muse (1869), and A Castle and Warriors (1871). His Portrait of Myself, with Death playing a violin (1872), was painted after his return again to Munich, where he exhibited Battle of the Centaurs, Landscape with Moorish Horsemen and A Farm (1875). From 1876 to 1885 Böcklin was working at Florence, and painted a Pietà, Ulysses and Calypso, Prometheus, and the Sacred Grove.

From 1886 to 1892 he settled at Zürich, after which he resided at San Domenico, near Florence. From this period are the Naiads at Play, A Sea Idyll, and War.

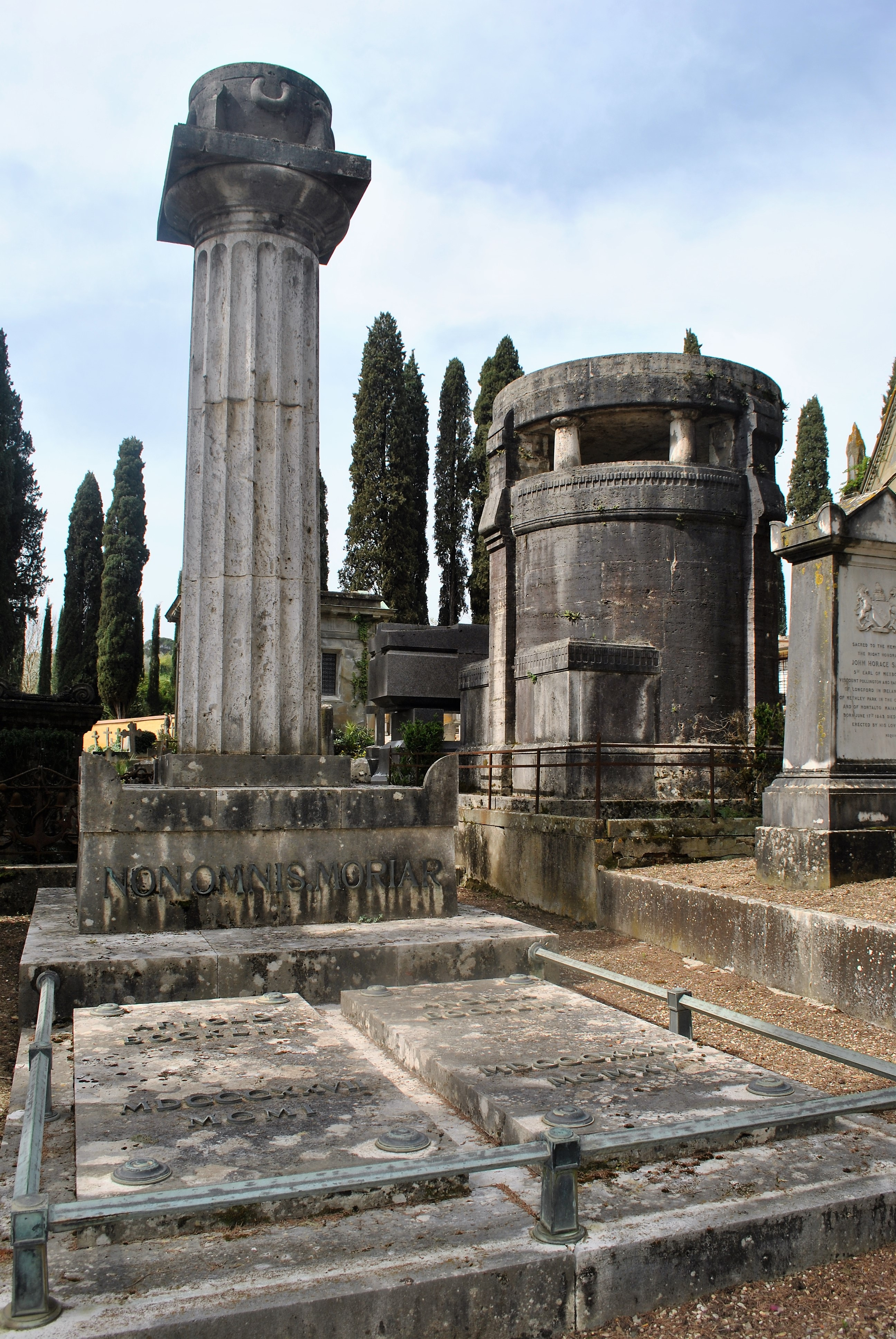
Grave of Arnold Böcklin, Cimitero degli Allori, Florence, Italy

Böcklin died on 16 January 1901 in Fiesole, Tuscany. He is buried in the Cimitero degli Allori in the southern suburb of Florence, Italy.

== Symbolism ==
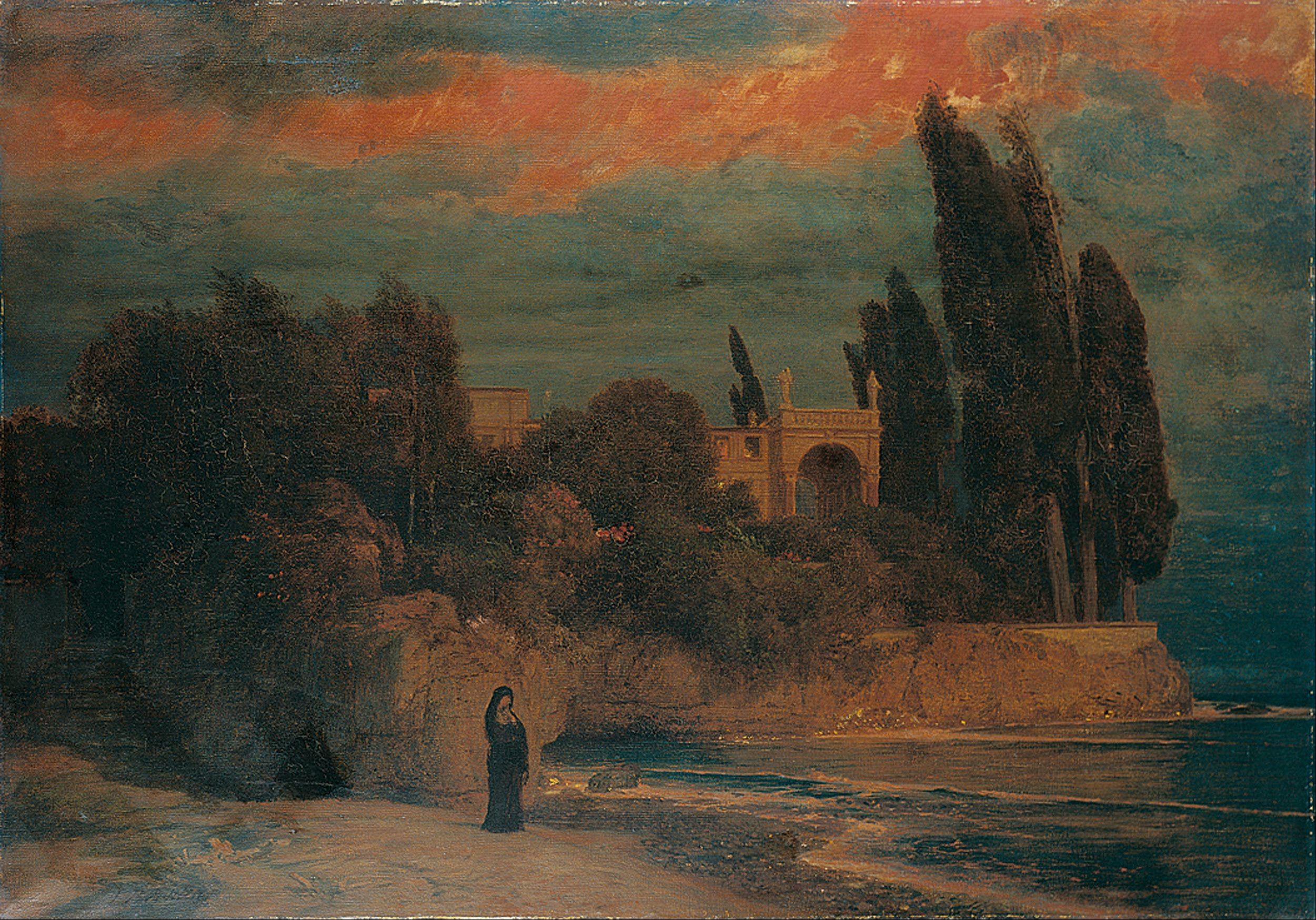
Villa by the Sea

Influenced by Romanticism, Böcklin's symbolist use of imagery derived from mythology and legend often overlapped with the aesthetic of the Pre-Raphaelites. Many of his paintings are imaginative interpretations of the classical world, or portray mythological subjects in settings involving classical architecture, often allegorically exploring death and mortality in the context of a strange, fantasy world.

Böcklin is best known for his five versions (painted 1880 to 1886) of the Isle of the Dead, which partly evokes the English Cemetery, Florence, which was close to his studio and where his baby daughter Maria had been buried. An early version of the painting was commissioned by a Madame Berna, a widow who wanted a painting with a dreamlike atmosphere.

Clement Greenberg wrote in 1947 that Böcklin's work "is one of the most consummate expressions of all that is now disliked about the latter half of the nineteenth century."

== Legacy ==
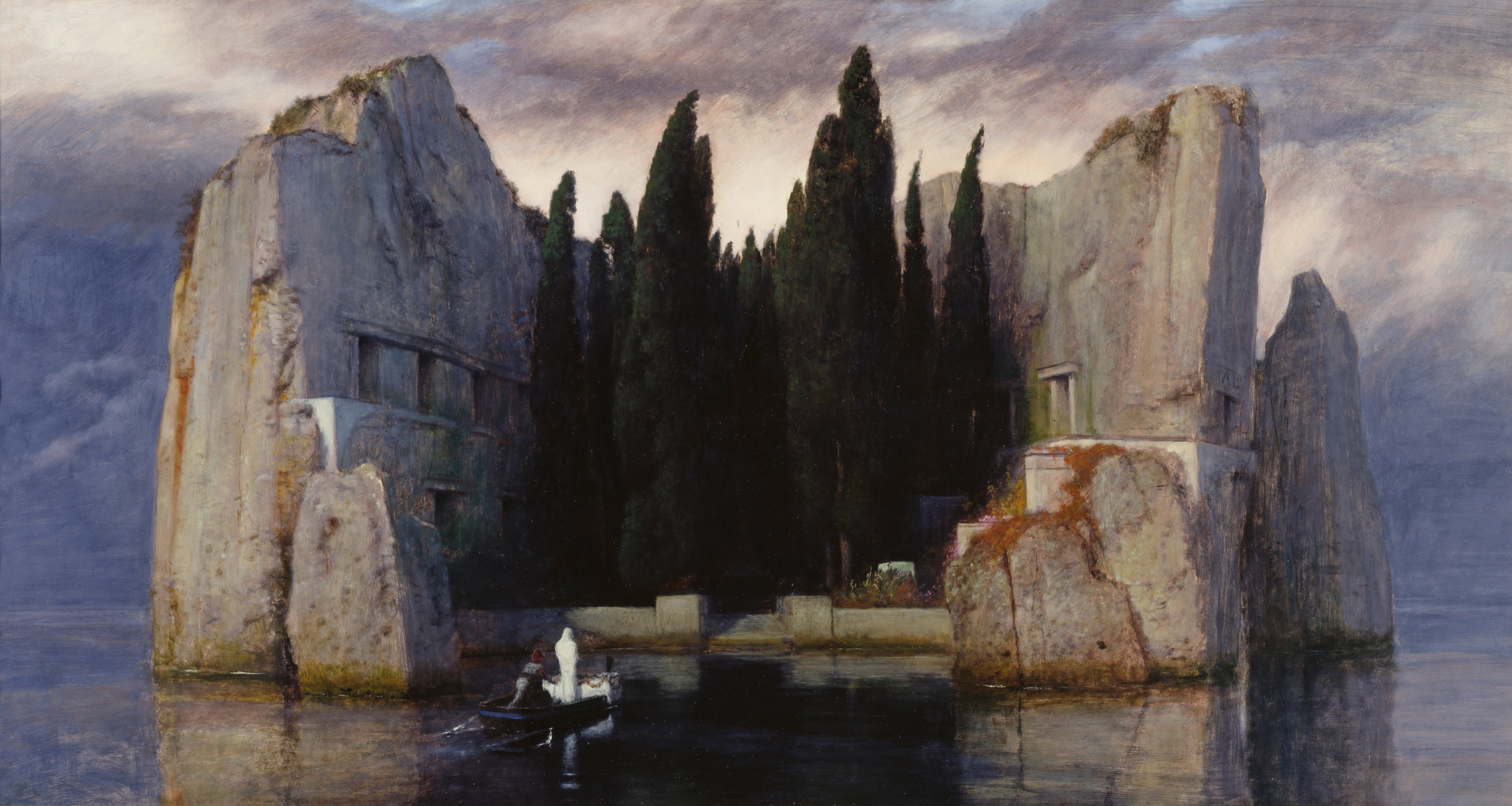
Isle of the Dead (Die Toteninsel): Third version, 1883. Alte Nationalgalerie, Berlin.

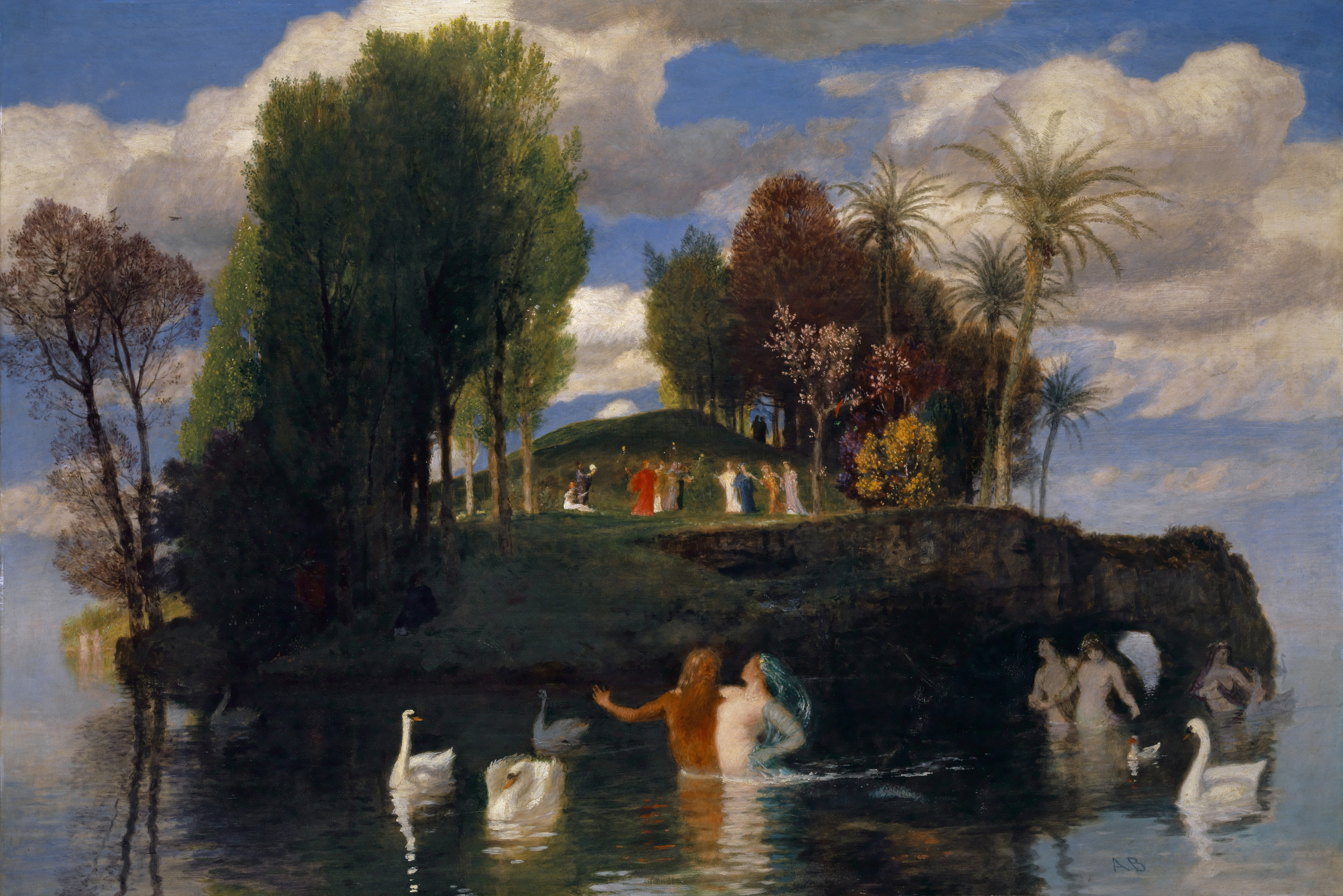
The Island of Life (Die Lebensinsel), 1888. Kunstmuseum Basel, Basel.

During his lifetime, Böcklin achieved considerable recognition, especially in central Europe, and influenced younger artists such as Hans Thoma. After his death in 1901 his reputation declined rapidly as modern art styles made the literary character of his paintings seem old-fashioned. Despite this, his work was a significant influence on Giorgio de Chirico – who said "Each of Böcklin's works is a shock" – and was admired by Surrealist painters such as Max Ernst and Salvador Dalí. A general revival of interest in Böcklin began only in the 1960s.

When asked who was his favorite painter, Marcel Duchamp controversially named Arnold Böcklin as having a major influence on his art. Whether Duchamp was serious in this assertion is still debated.

H. R. Giger created a picture called Homage à Böcklin, based upon Isle of the Dead.

Museums holding several works by Böcklin include the Kunstmuseum Basel and the Kunsthaus Zürich.

=== In music ===
Böcklin's paintings, especially Isle of the Dead, inspired several late-Romantic composers.

- Gustav Mahler's song Des Antonius von Padua Fischpredigt (St. Anthony's Sermon to the Fish) from his Des Knaben Wunderhorn song cycle, which also appears as the Scherzo movement in Mahler's Symphony No. 2 (Mahler) was inspired by Böcklin's 1892 painting, St. Anthony Preaching to the Fish.
- Hans Huber's second symphony is entitled Böcklin-Sinfonie / "Sieh es lacht die Au'", Op. 115 (1897)
- Andreas Hallén, a Swedish Romantic composer, wrote a symphonic poem Die Toteninsel in 1898.
- In 1891, Portuguese pianist José Vianna da Motta composed two pieces on Böcklin's paintings Meeresidylle and Im Spiel der Wellen.
- Böcklin's Das Gefilde der Seligen (Elysium) appears on the cover of Felix Weingartner's eponymous tone-poem, Op.21 (1897).
- In 1903, Austrian, later American, composer Karl Weigl composed a tone poem for piano "Die Toteninsel".
- Sergei Rachmaninoff wrote his symphonic poem Isle of the Dead in 1909. He was also inspired by Böcklin's painting Die Heimkehr ("The Homecoming" or "The Return") when writing his Prelude in B minor, Op. 32, No. 10.
- Heinrich Schulz-Beuthen composed a symphonic poem after the Isle of the Dead (1909?)
- Felix Woyrsch composed 3 Böcklin Phantasies (Die Toteninsel, Der Eremit, Im Spiel der Wellen), Op. 53 (1910).
- In 1913 Max Reger composed a set of Four Tone Poems after Böcklin with the movements "Der geigende Eremit", "Im Spiel der Wellen", "Die Toteninsel", and "Bacchanal".
- In Mark Robson's film Isle of the Dead (1945), Disney composer Leigh Harline's somber score makes use of Sergei Rachmaninoff's music.
- Fulvio Caldini composed L'isola di Böcklin, his Op.85 for electronic instruments (2001).

=== Other ===
The Schriftgiesserei Otto Weisert foundry designed an Art Nouveau typeface in 1904 and named it "Arnold Böcklin" in his honor.

Adolf Hitler was fond of Böcklin's work, at one time owning 11 of his paintings.

Roger Zelazny's novel Isle of the Dead features a planet-building character inspired by the painting to create an Isle of the Dead on one of his worlds, and an Ace books edition features a cover painting by Dean Ellis that is deliberately reminiscent of Böcklin's work.

Yemelyan Yaroslavsky, Academician of the Academy of Sciences of the Soviet Union, opened his 1942 laudatory article on Dmitry Shostakovich's Seventh Symphony with an allusion to Böcklin's painting "War".

== Works ==
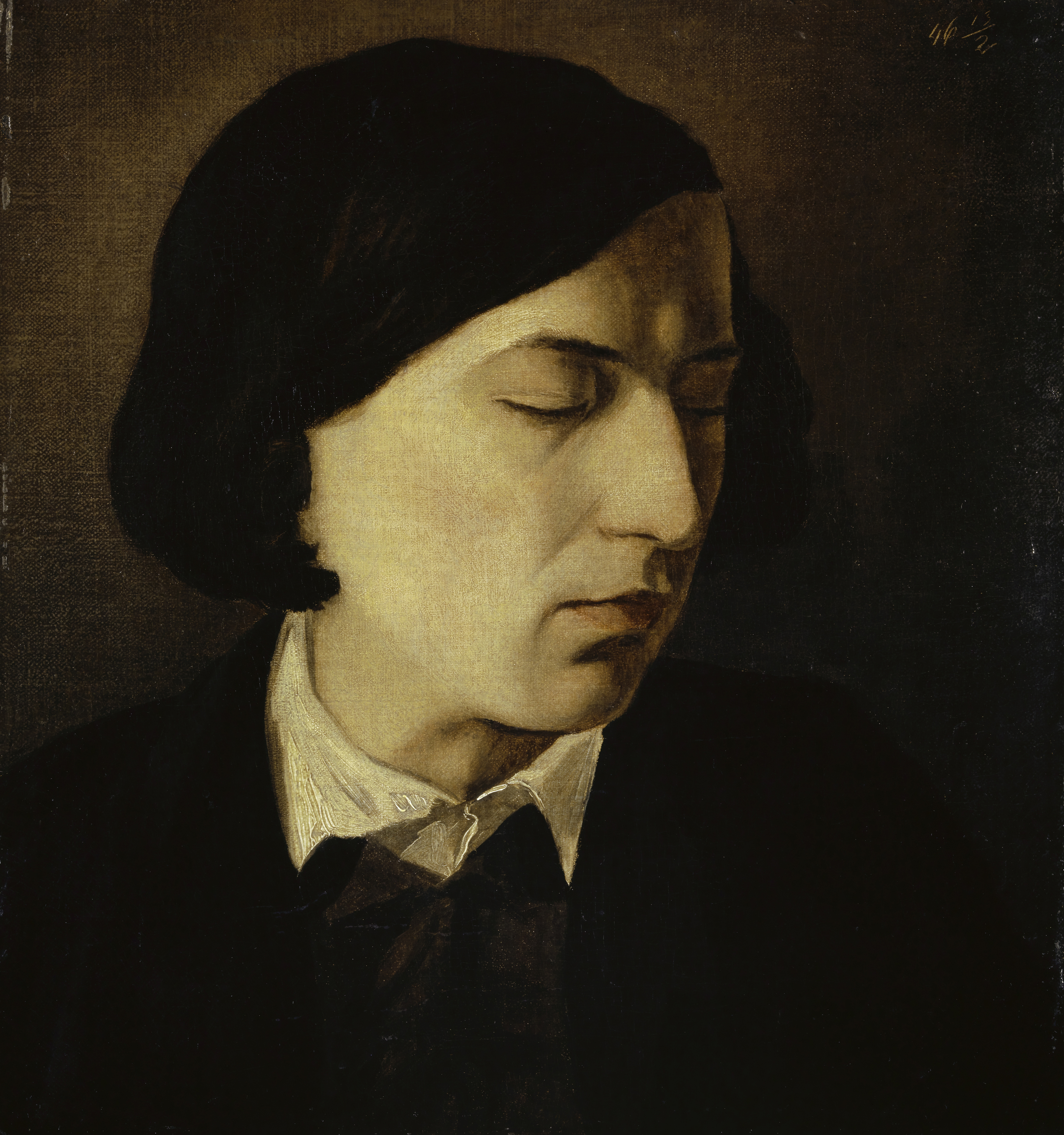
Alexander Michelis, 1846

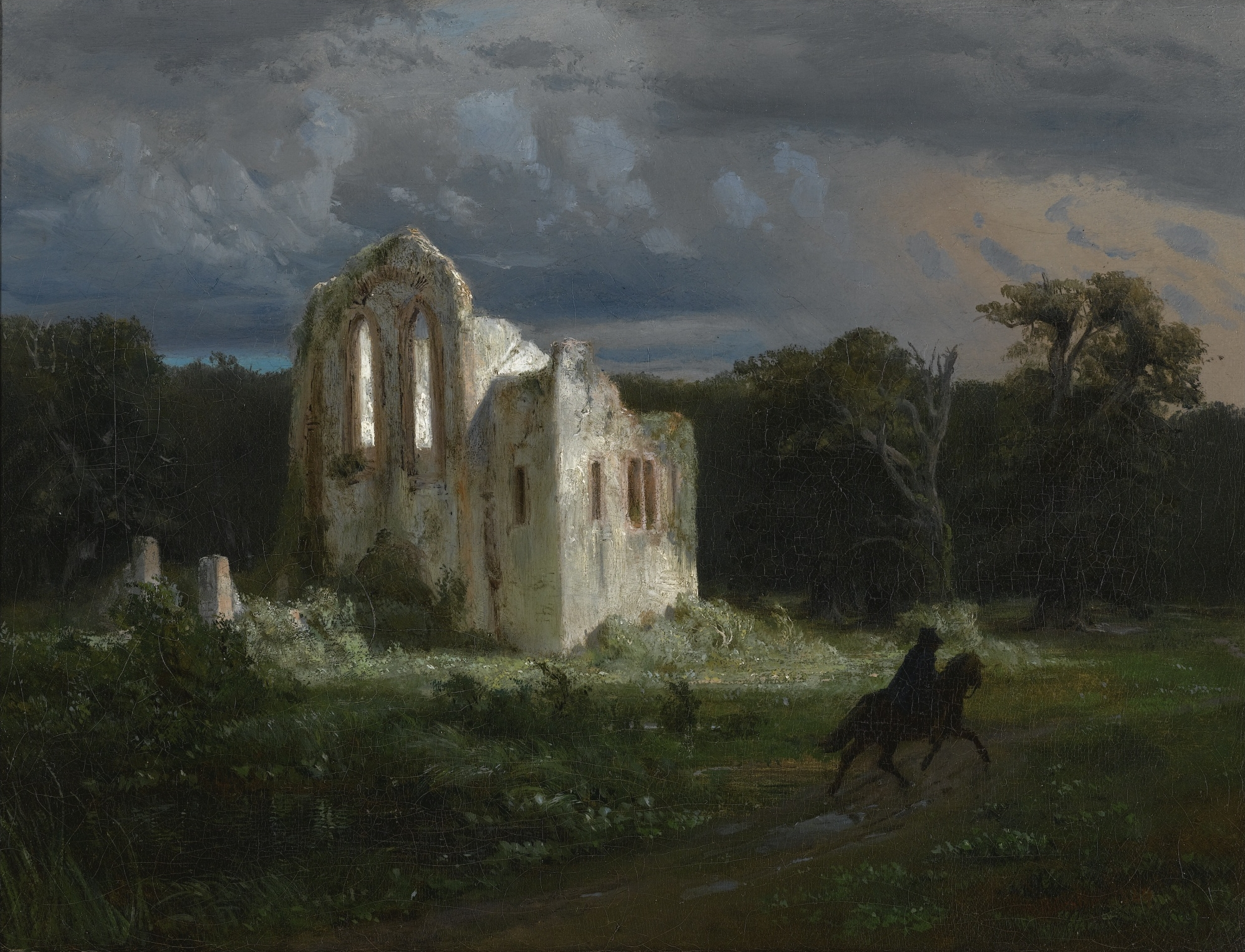
Moonlit Landscape, 1849

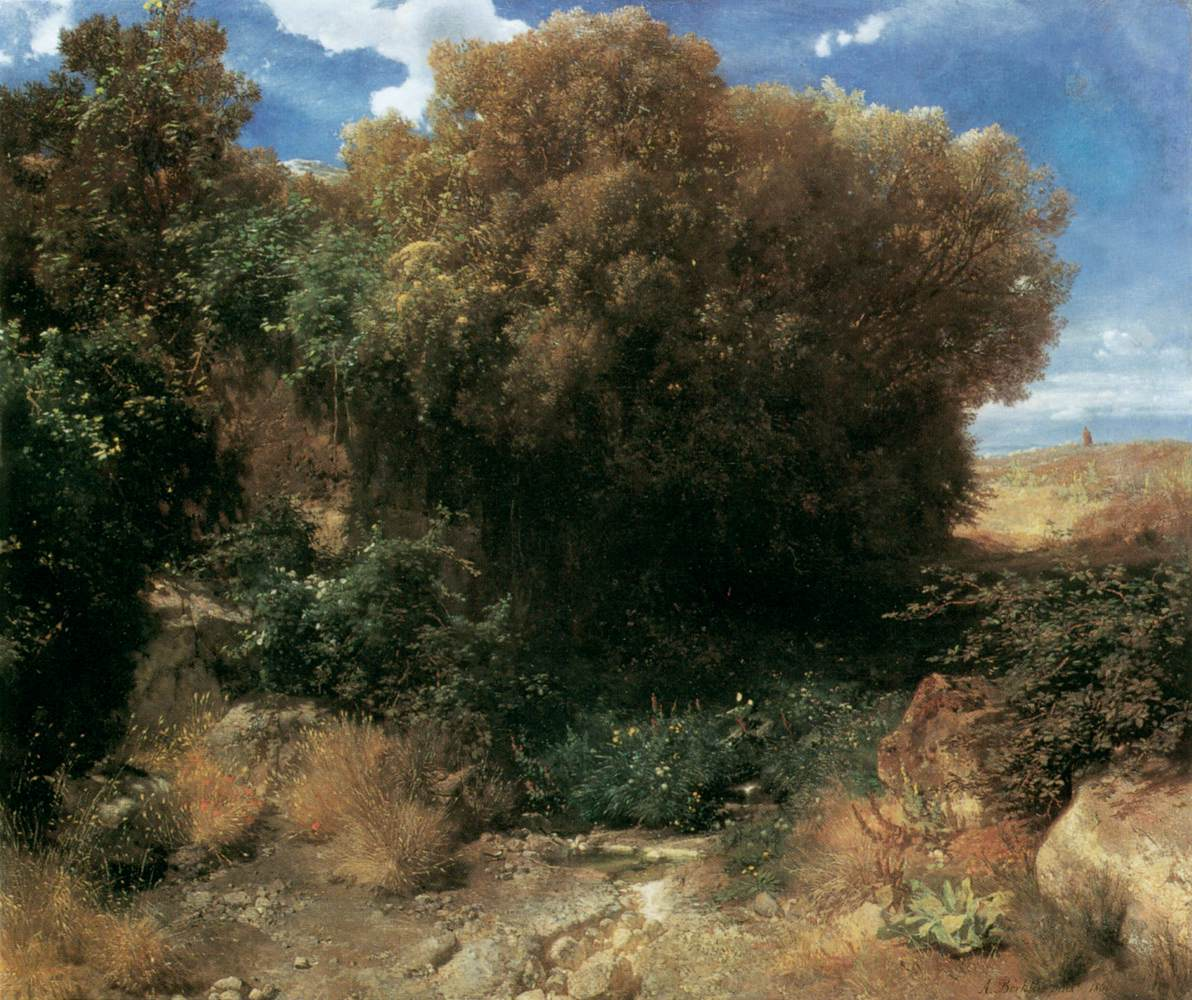
Campania Landscape, 1851

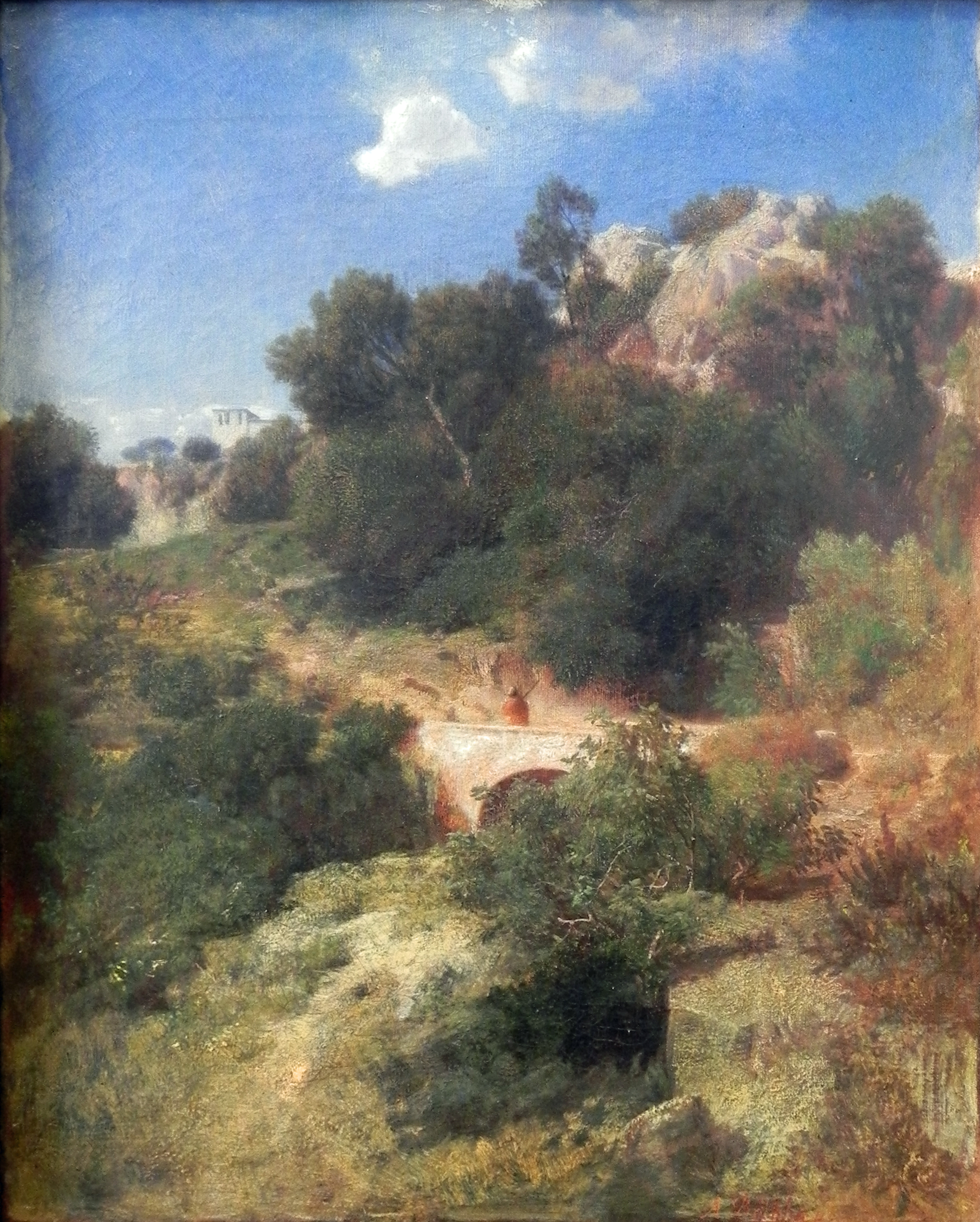
Italian Landscape, 1858

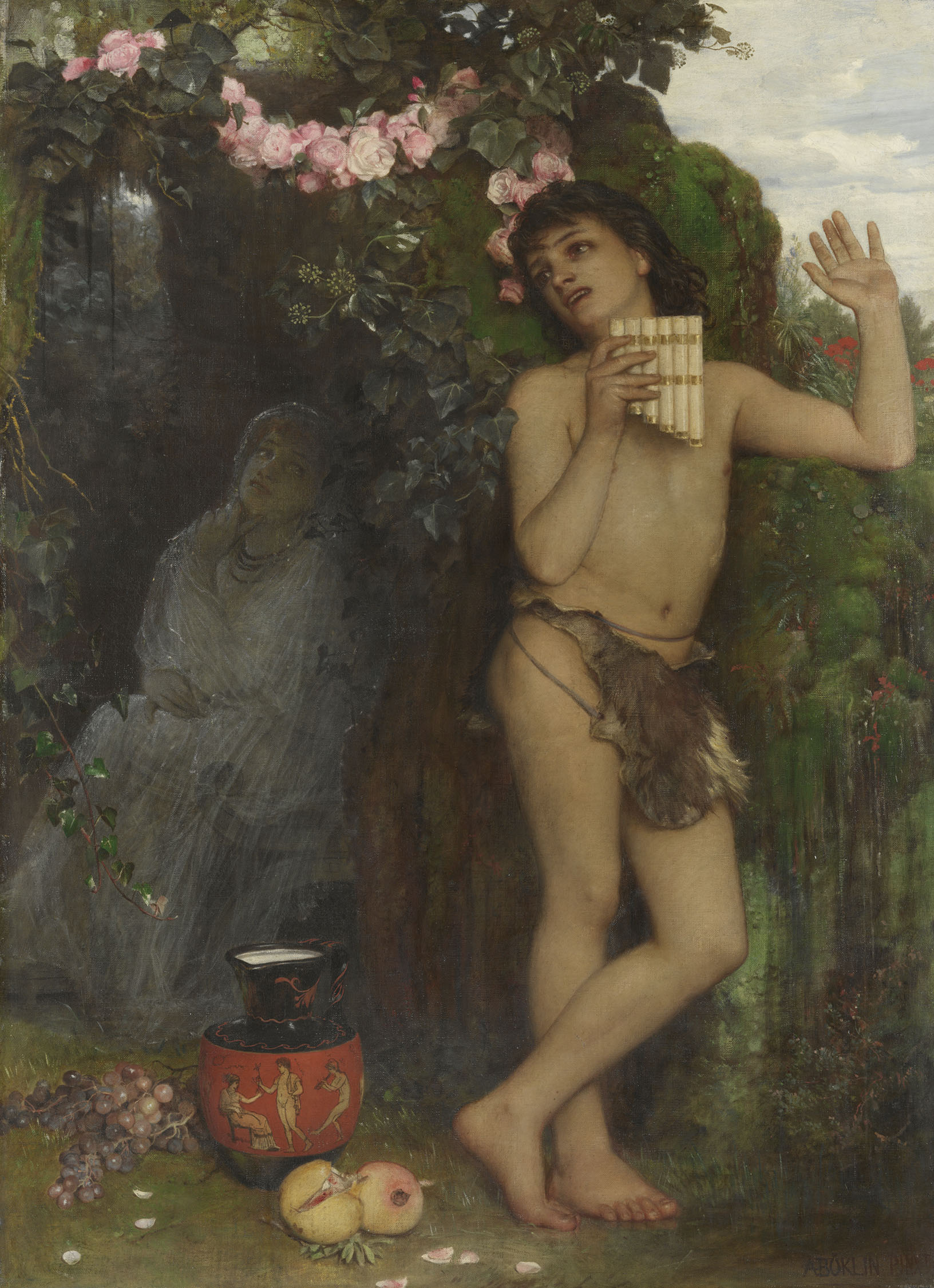
The Shepherd's Lament, 1866

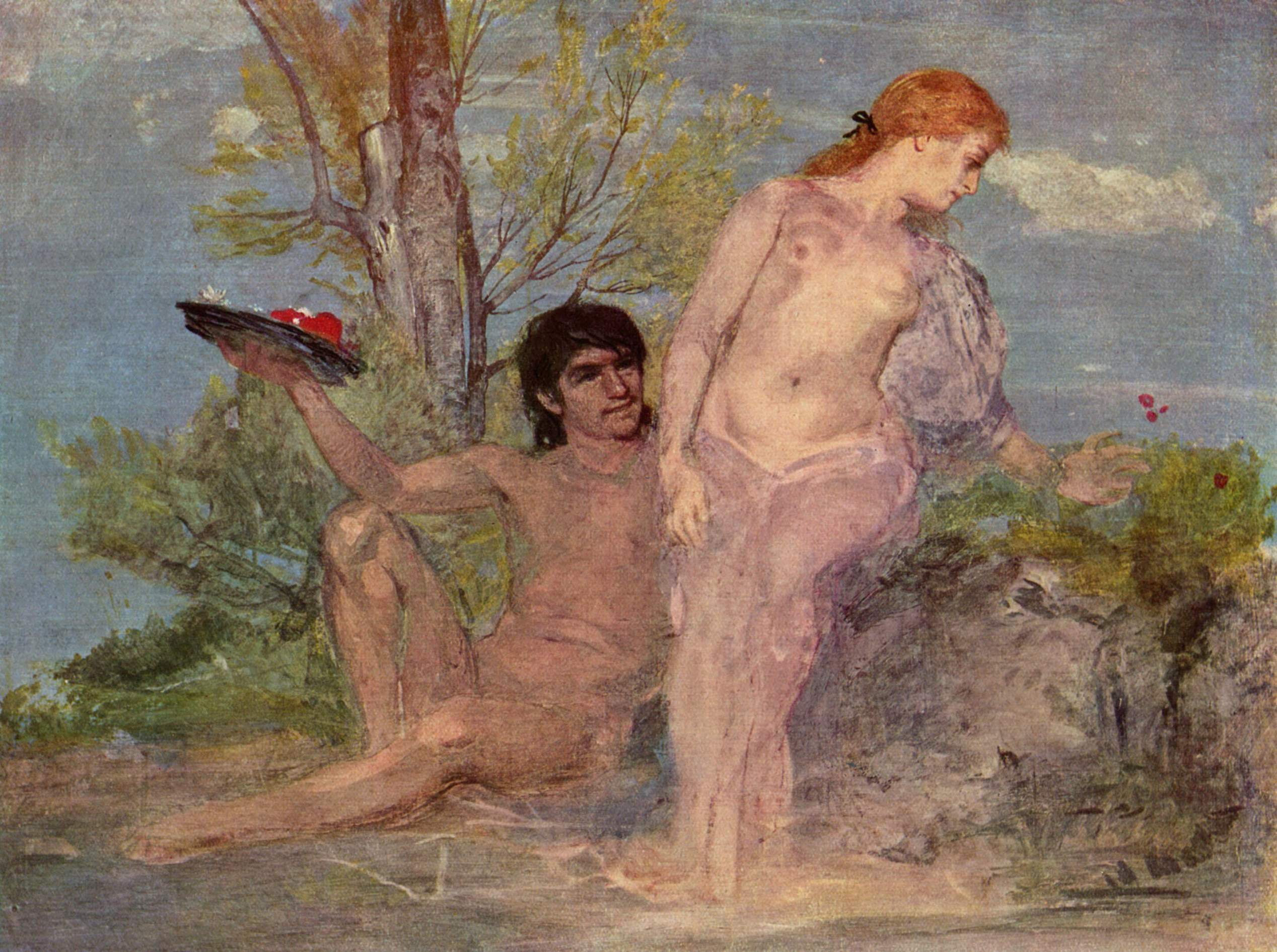
Idyll, 1866

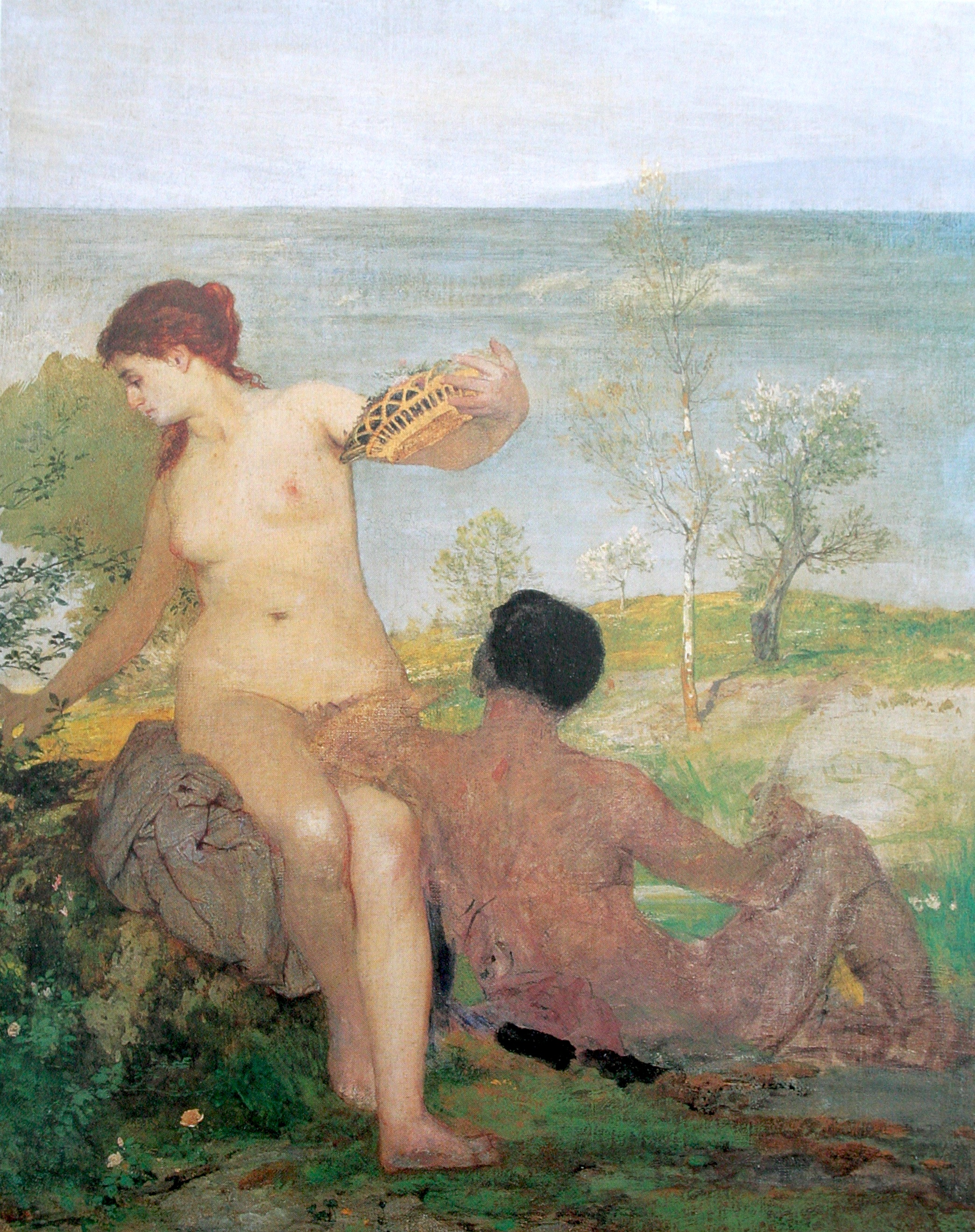
Boy and Girl Picking Flowers, c.1866

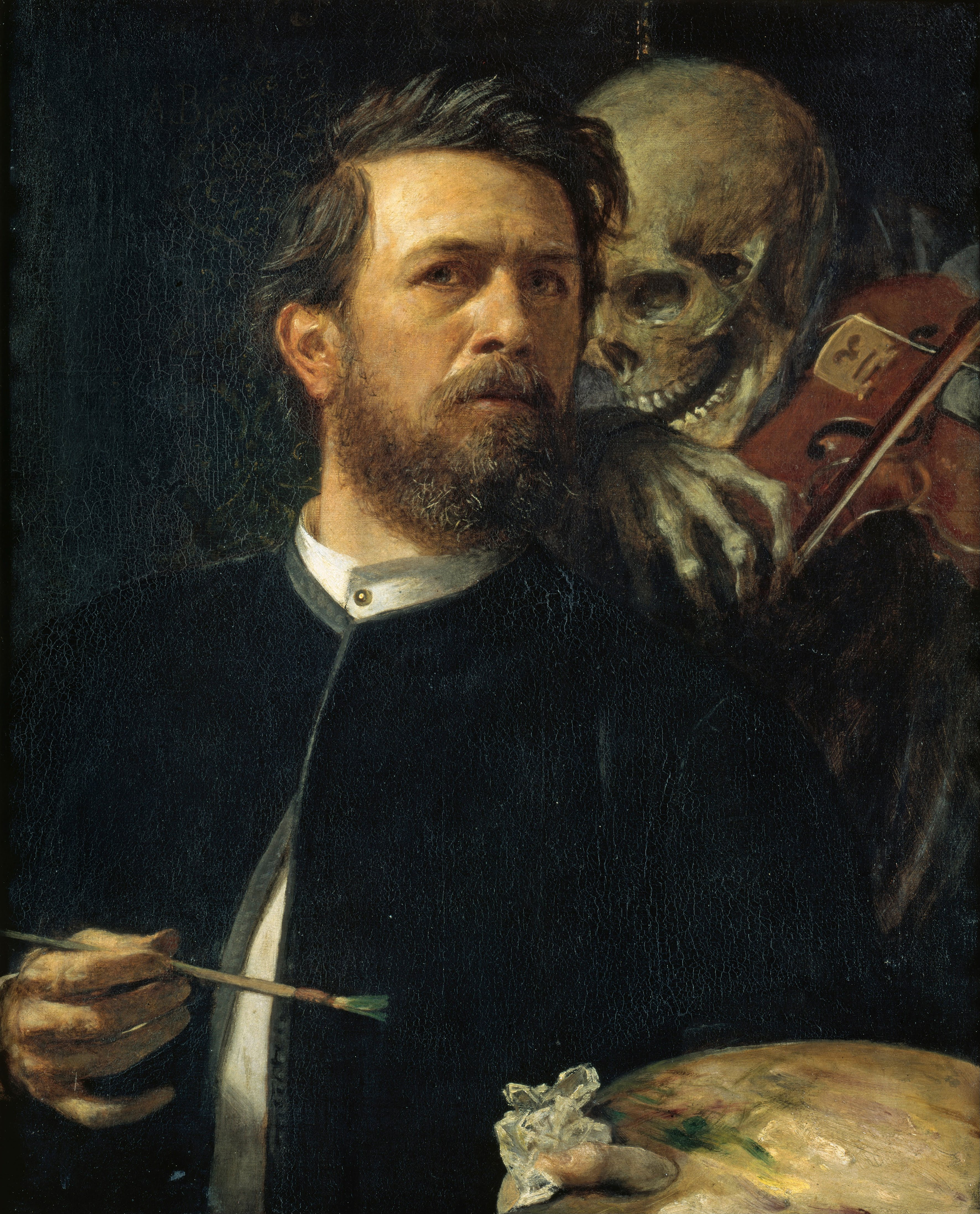
Self-portrait with Death playing the fiddle, 1872

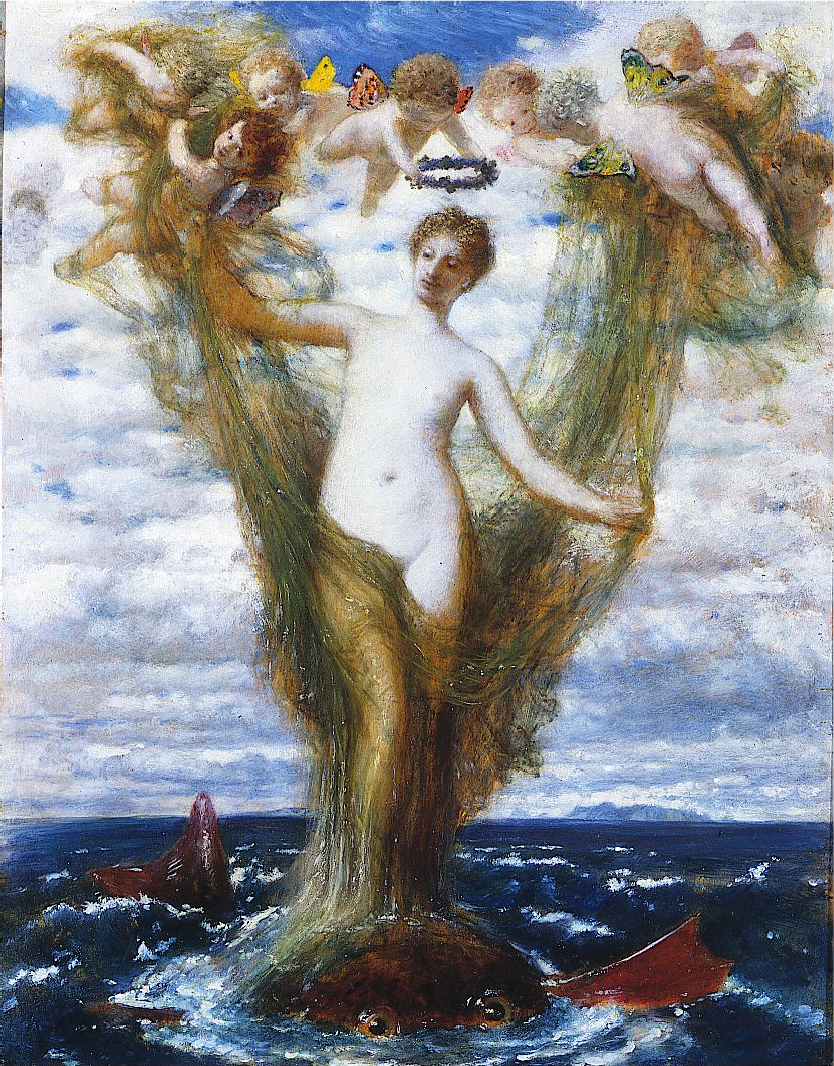
Venus Anadyomene, 1872

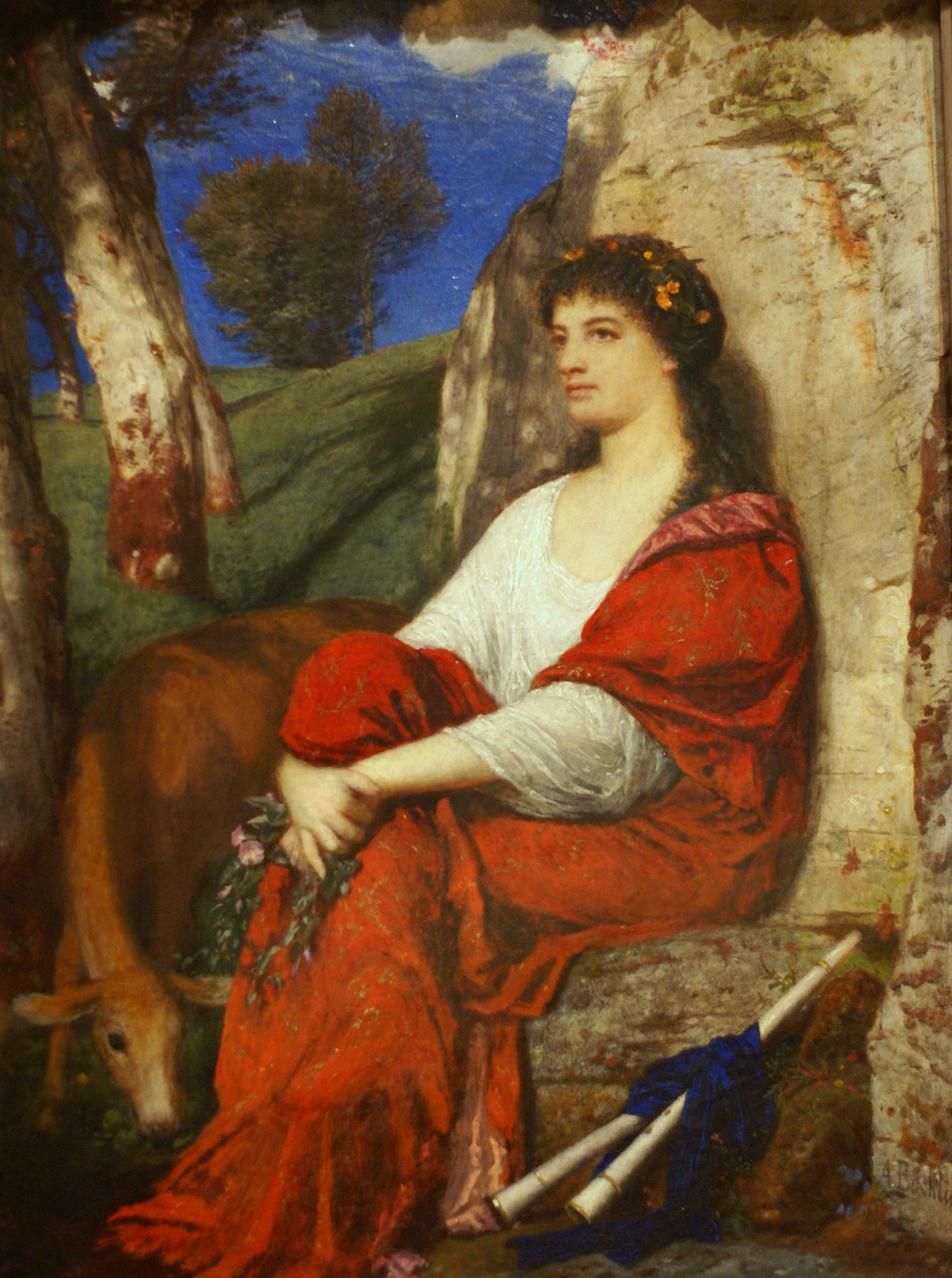
The Muse Euterpe, 1872

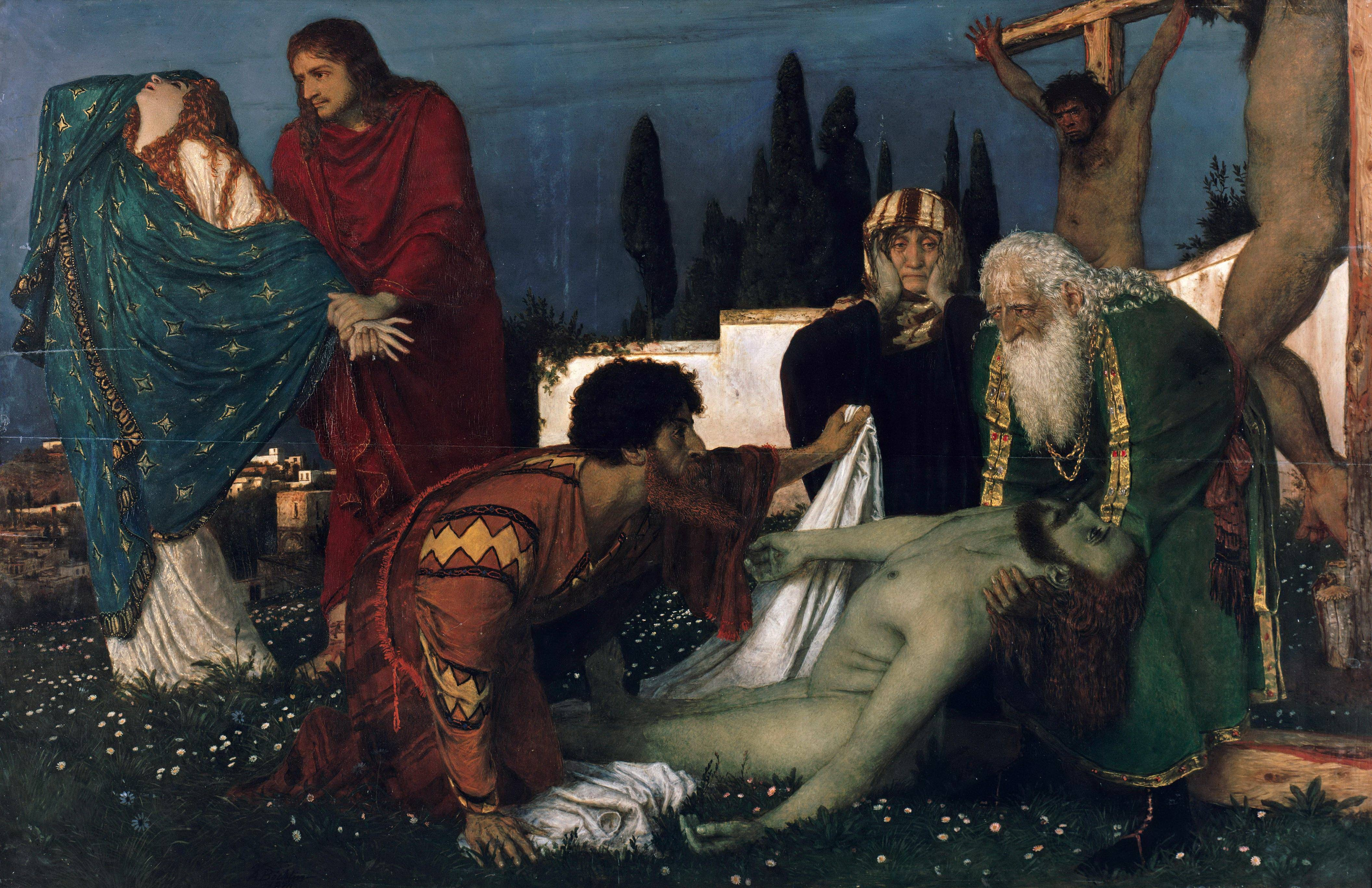
Mourning under the Cross, 1876

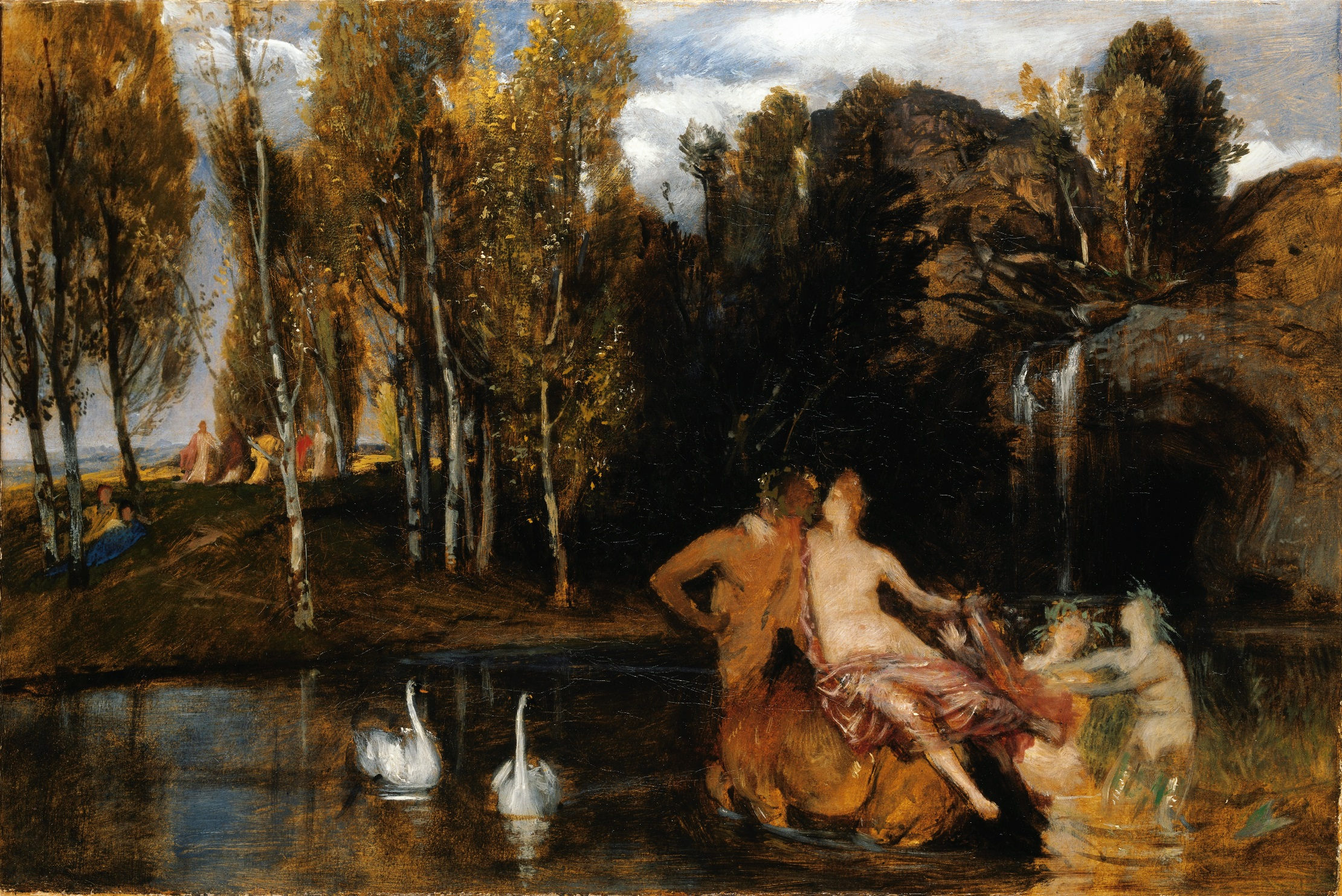
The Elysian Fields, 1877

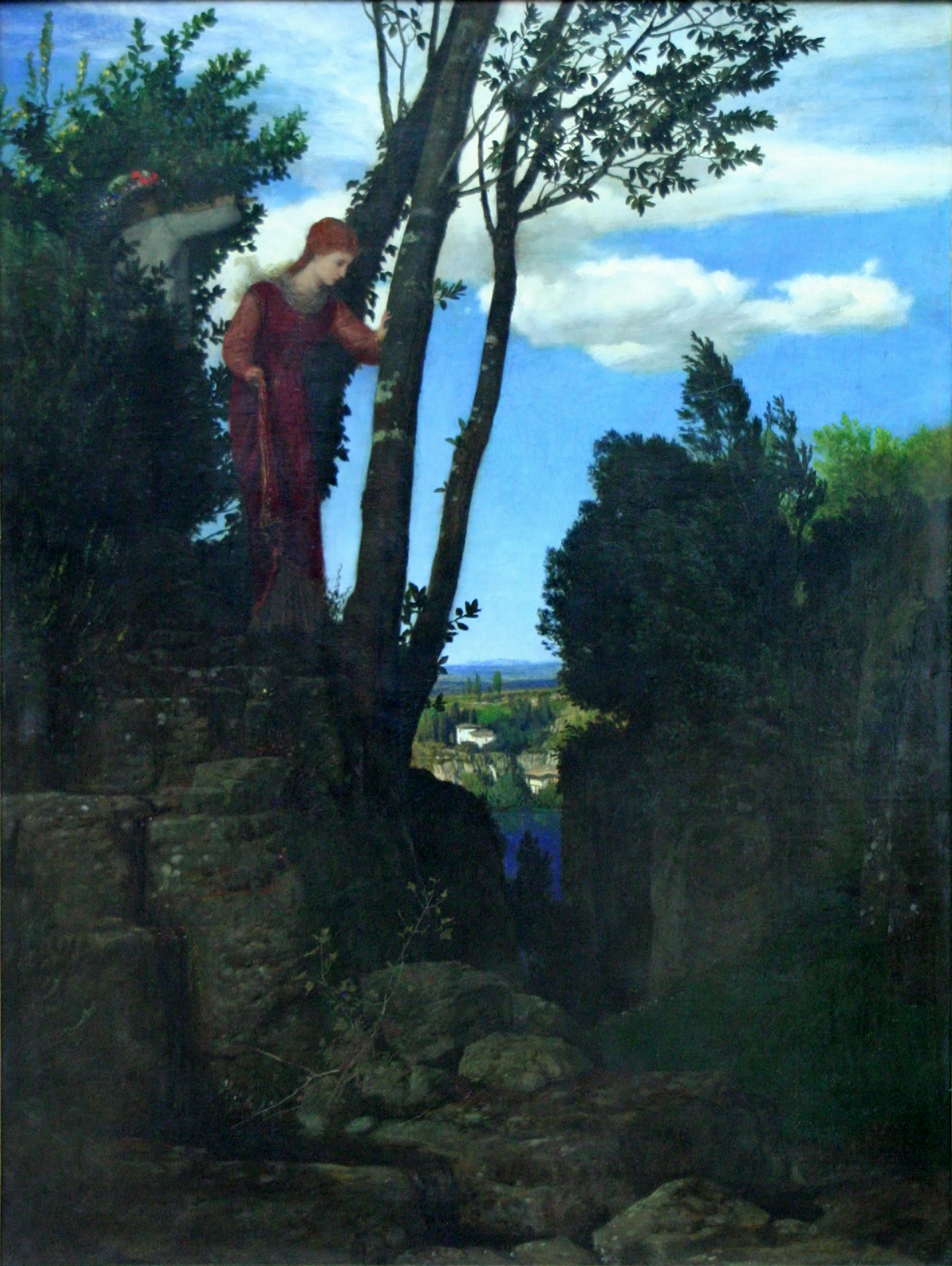
Honey Moon, 1878

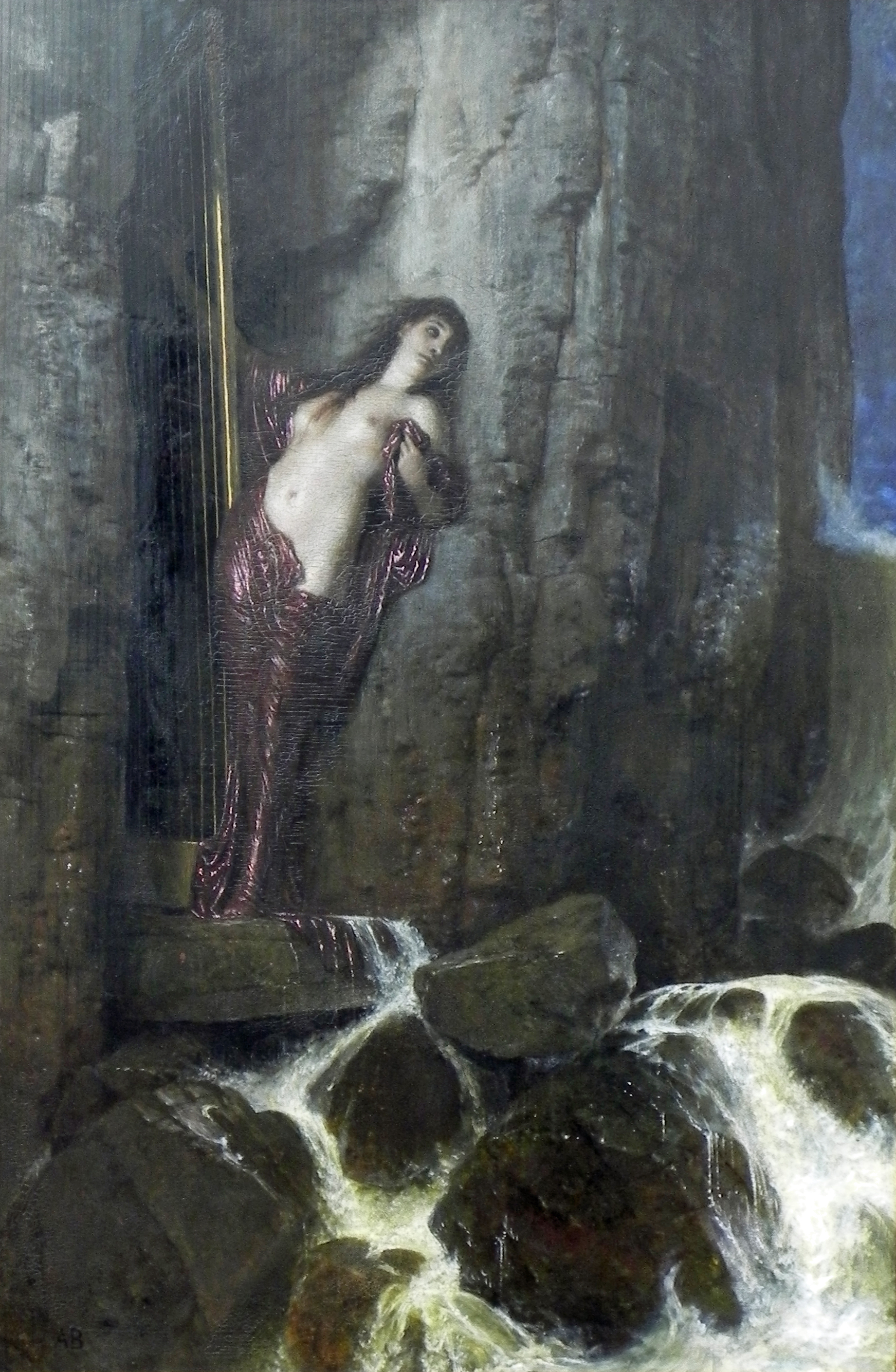
Ocean Breakers (The Sound), 1879

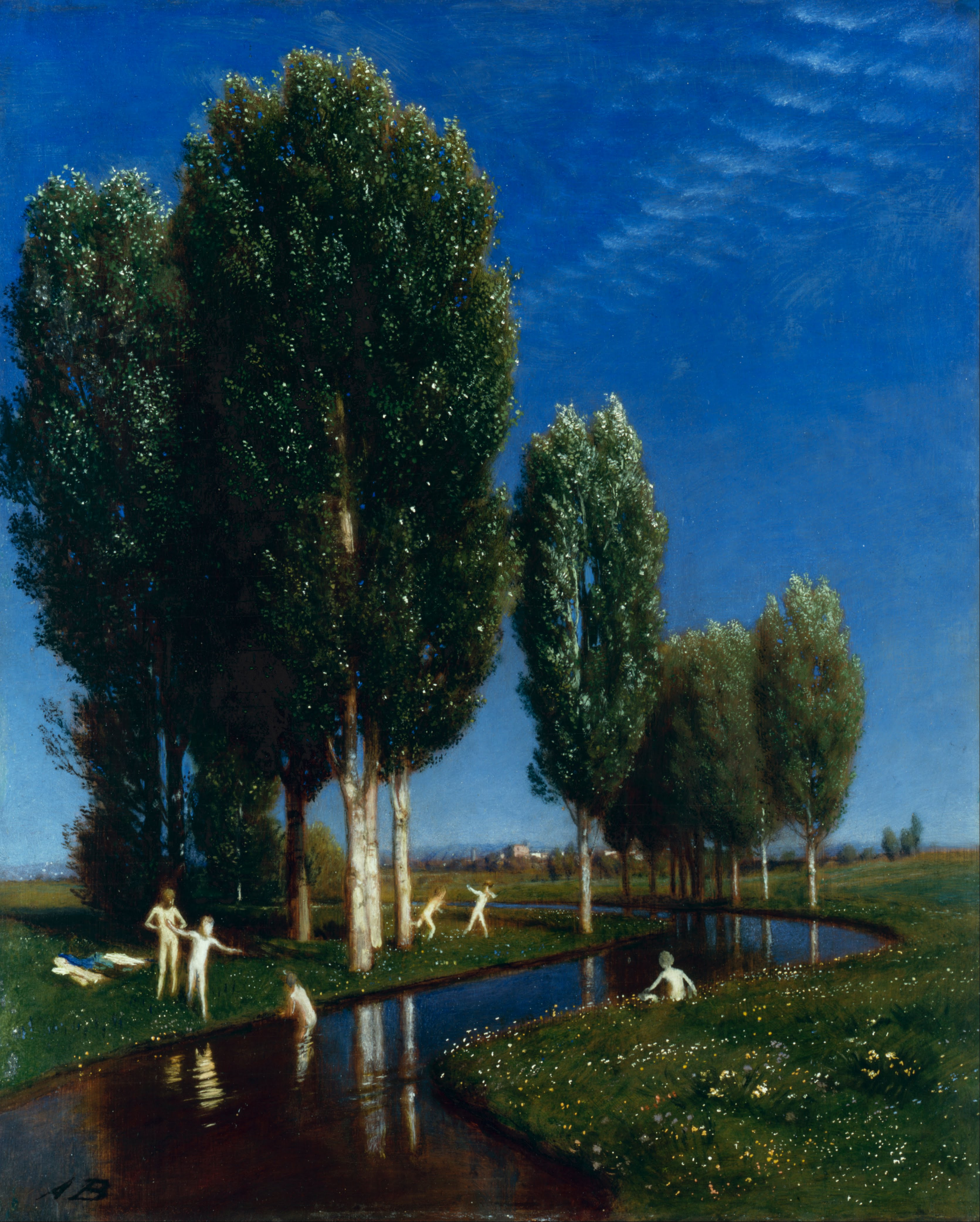
Summer Day, 1881

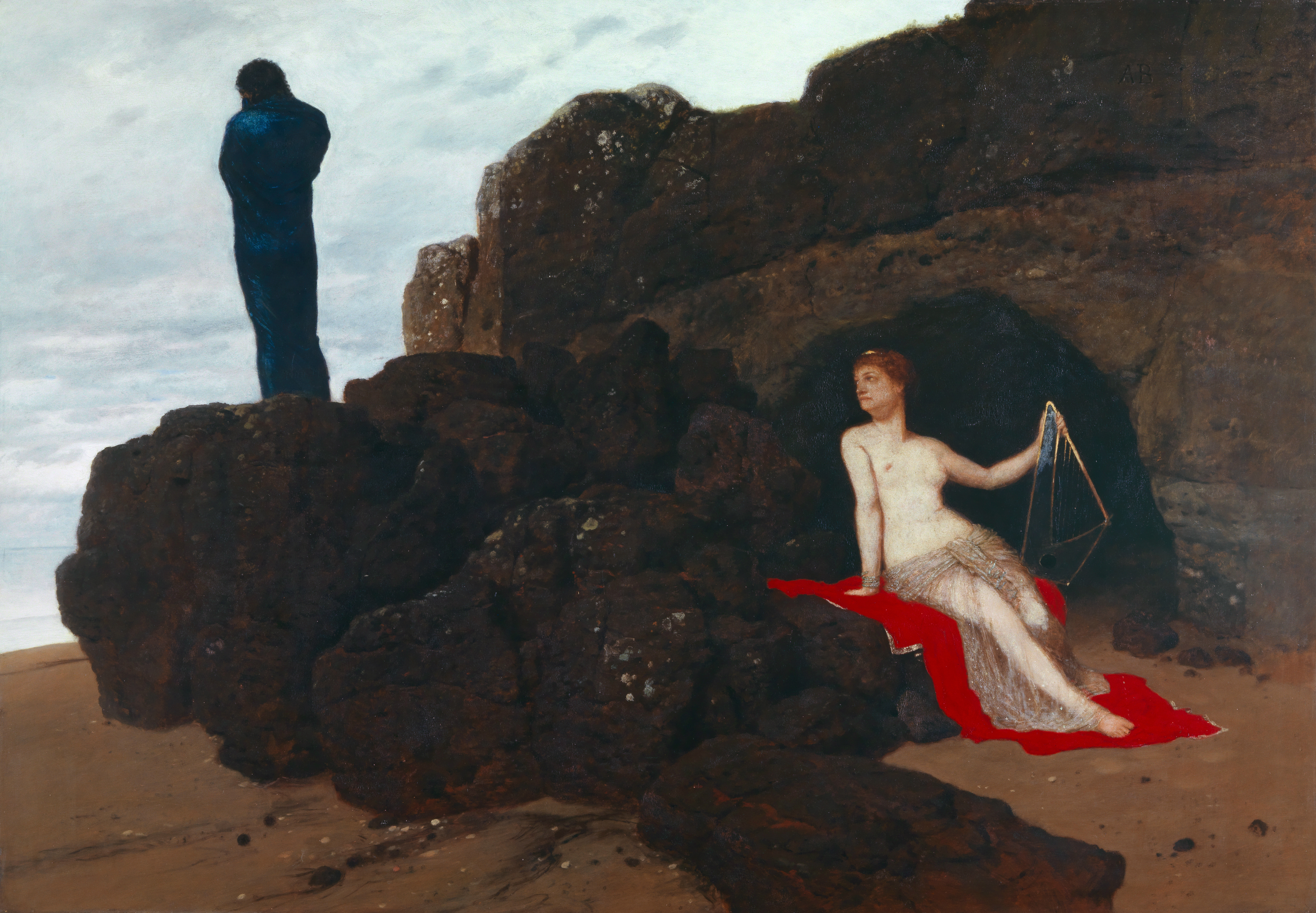
Odysseus and Calypso, 1882

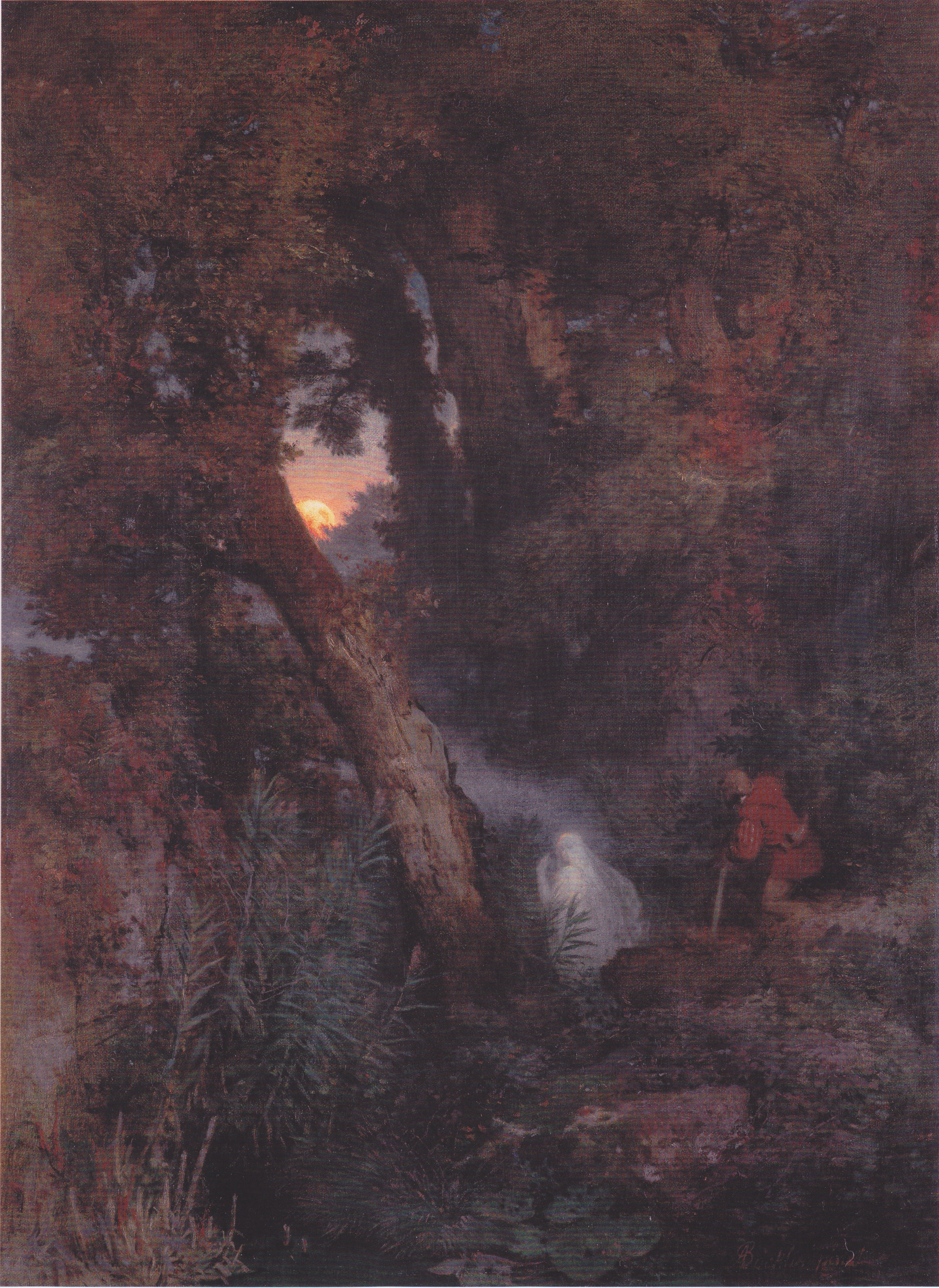
Will-o'-the-Wisp, 1882

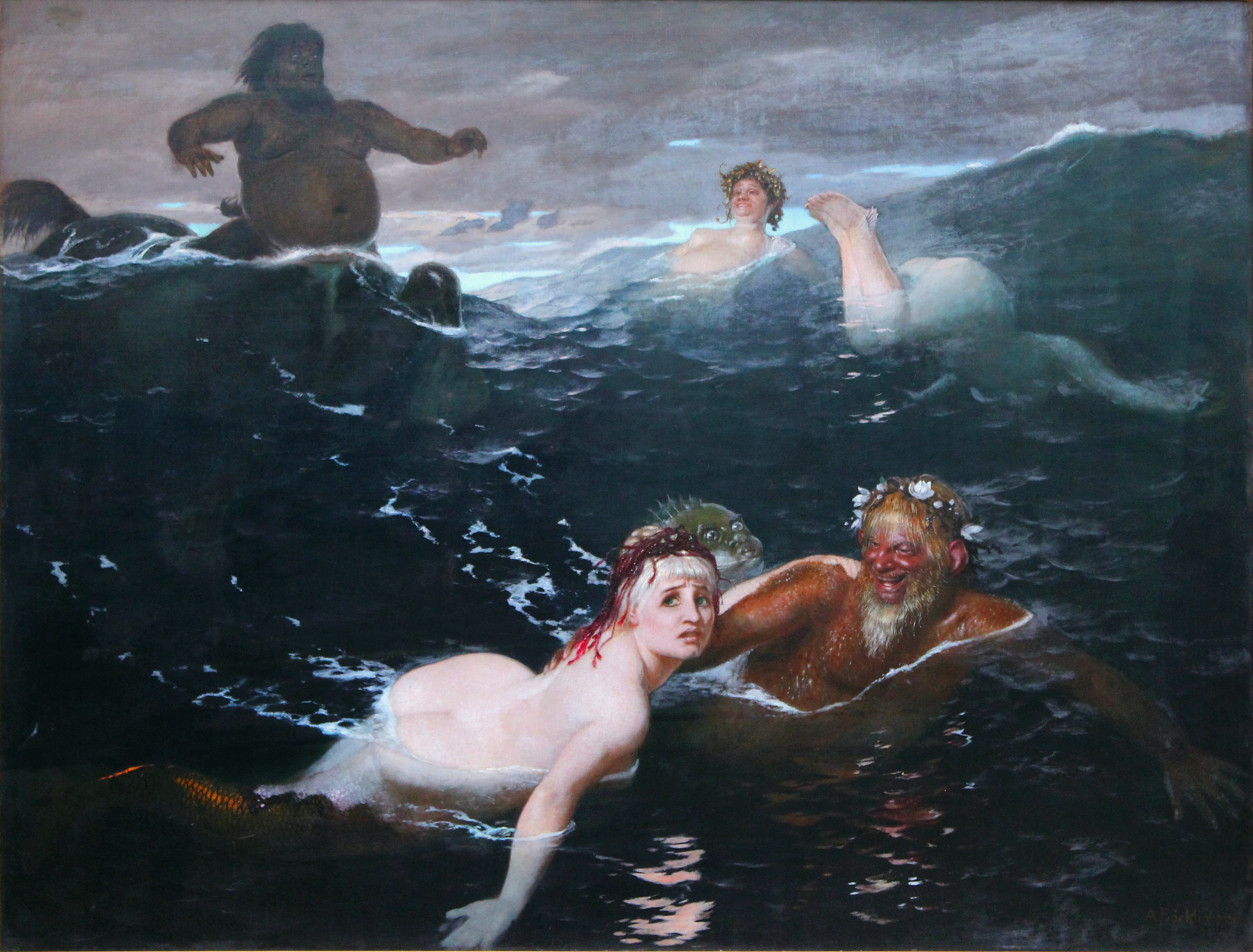
Playing in the Waves, 1883

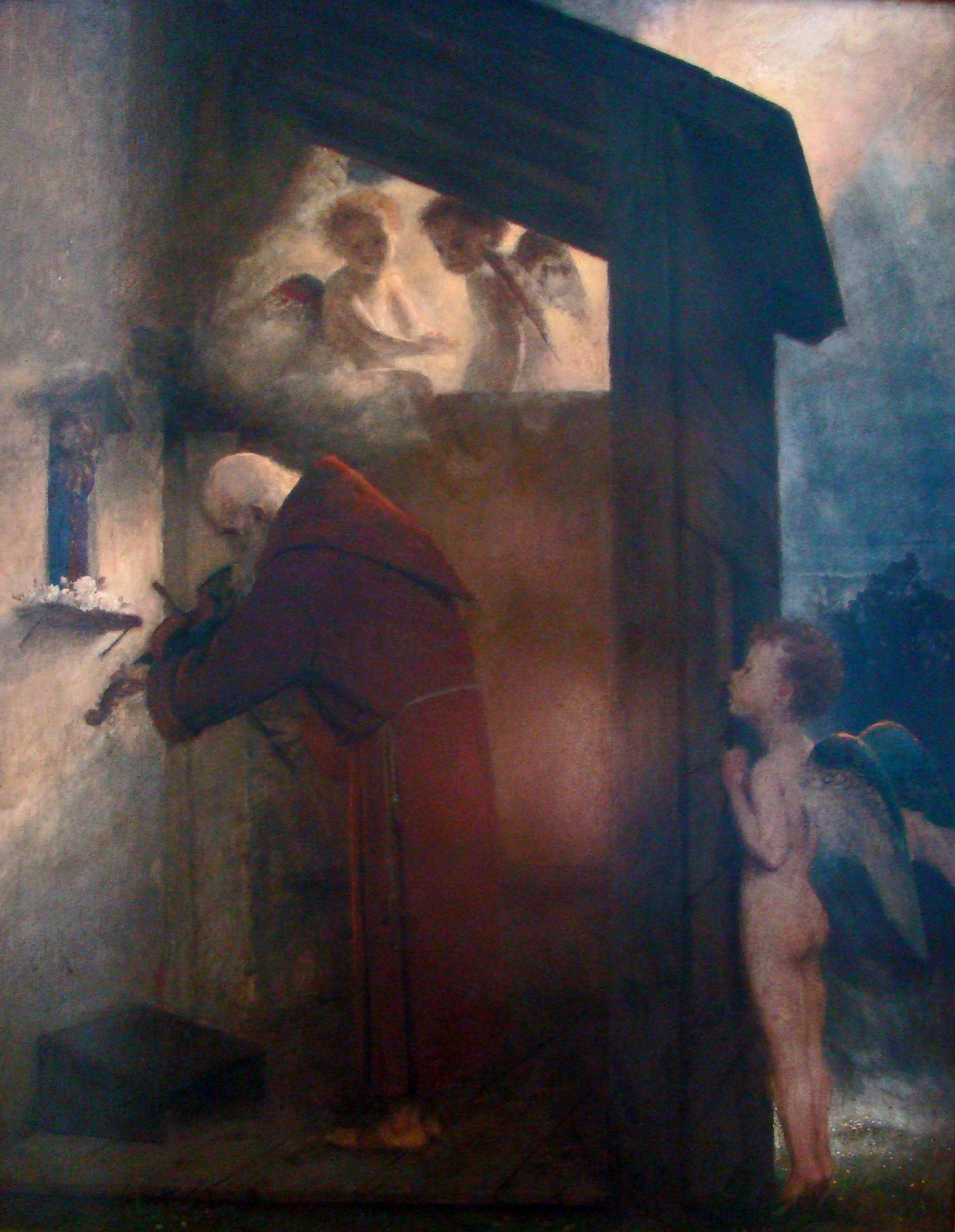
The Hermit, 1884

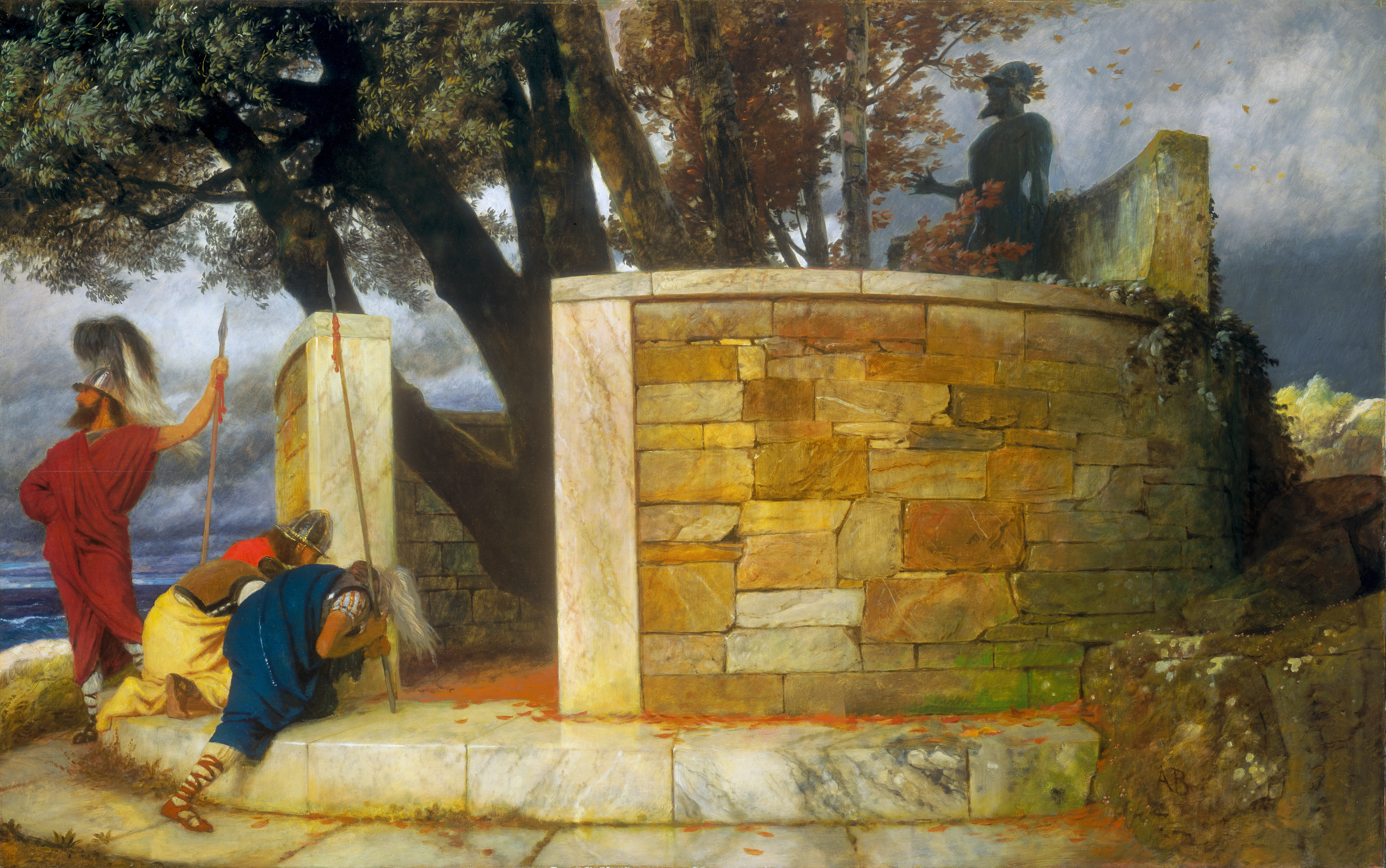
The Sanctuary of Hercules, 1884

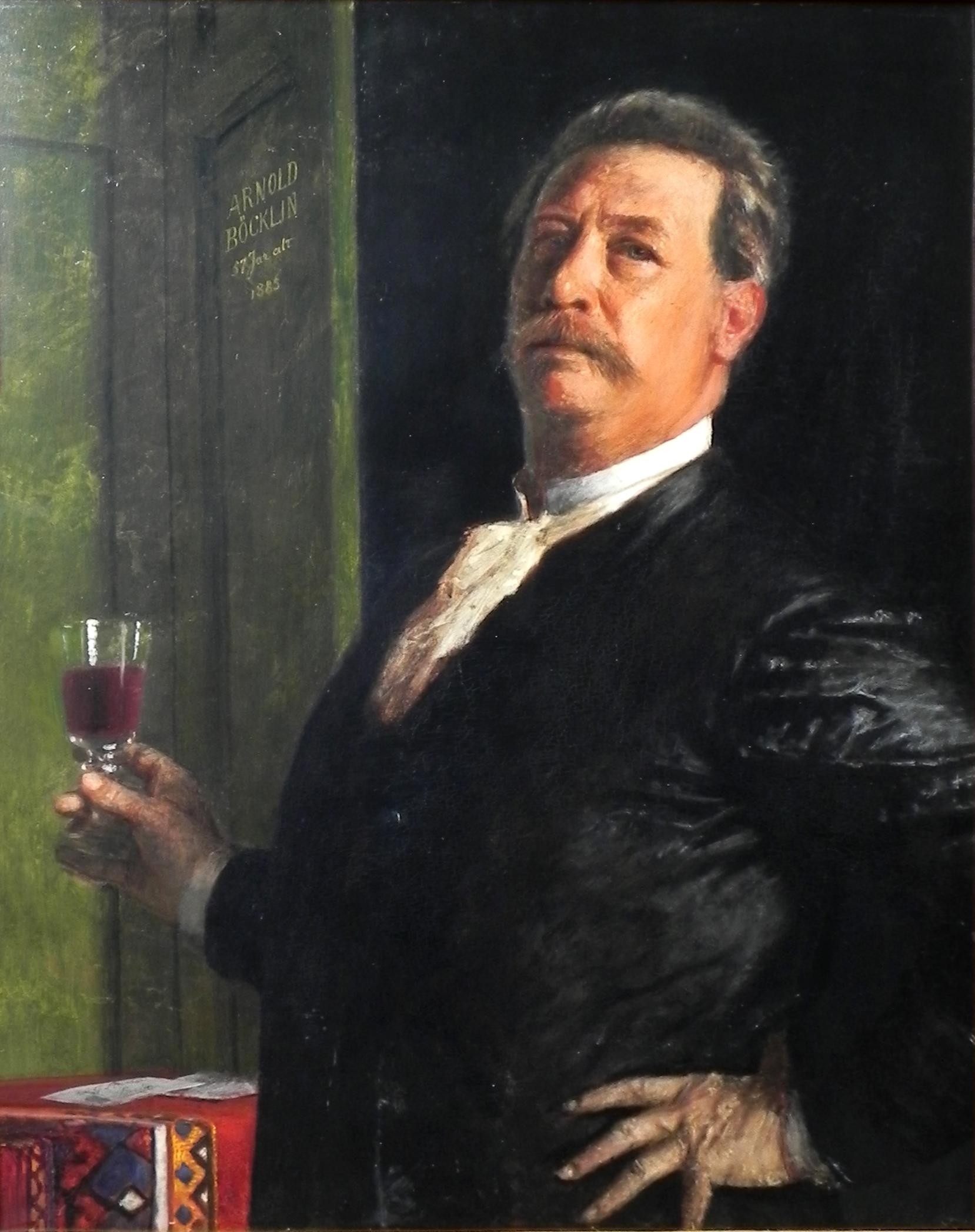
Self-portrait with the wine glass, 1885

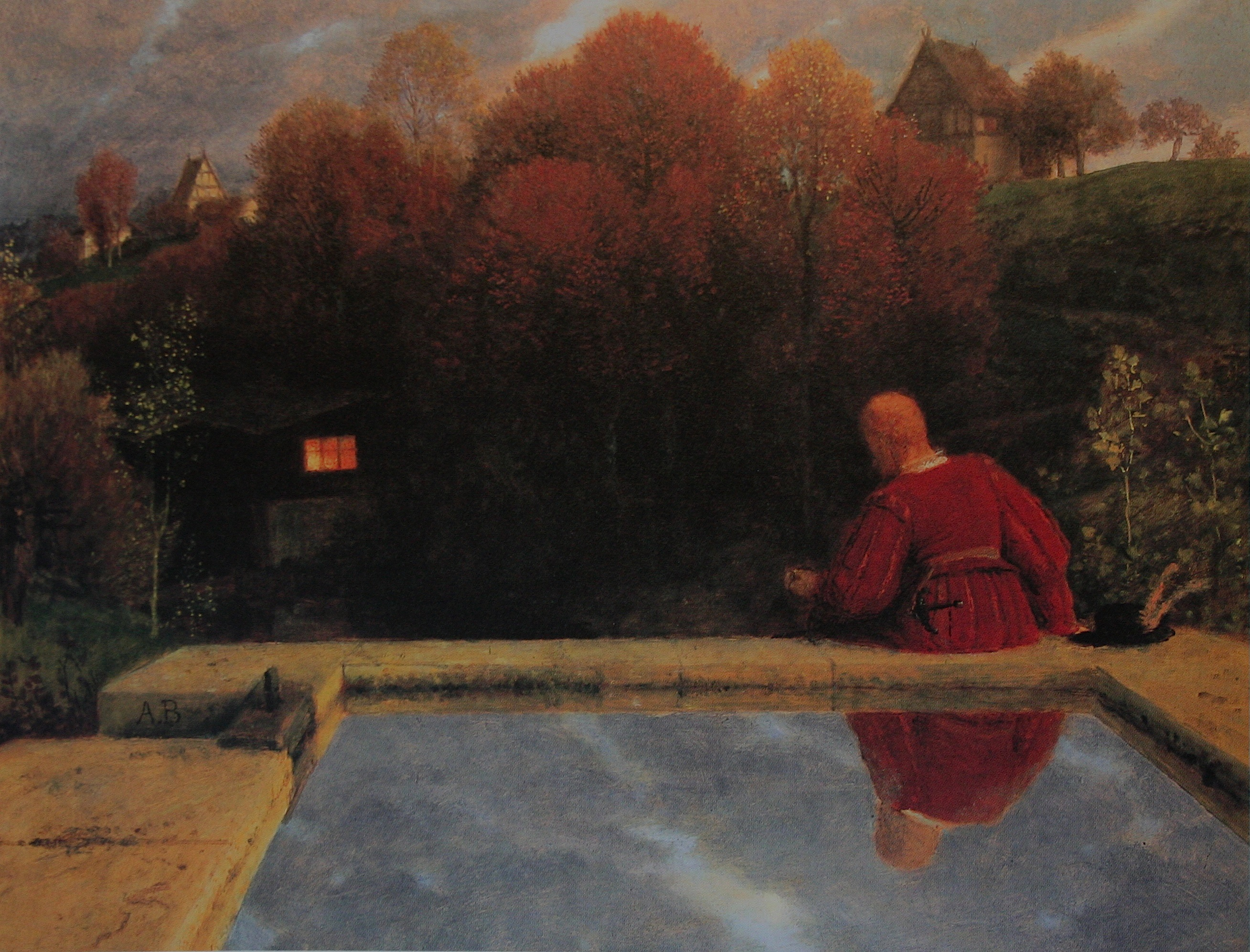
The Homecoming, 1887

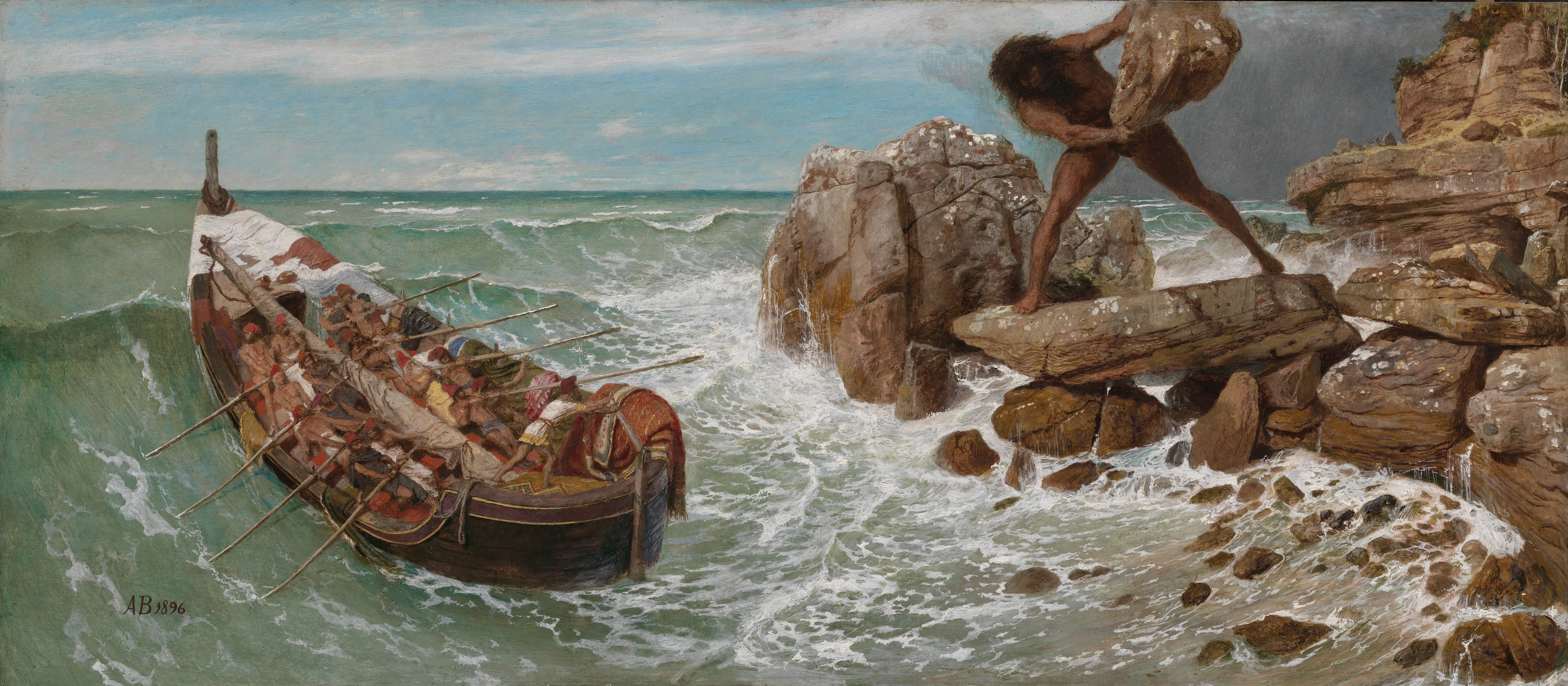
Odysseus and Polyphemus, 1896

== See also ==
- List of paintings by Arnold Böcklin
