= Roger Freeing Angelica (Böcklin) =

Painting by Arnold Böcklin

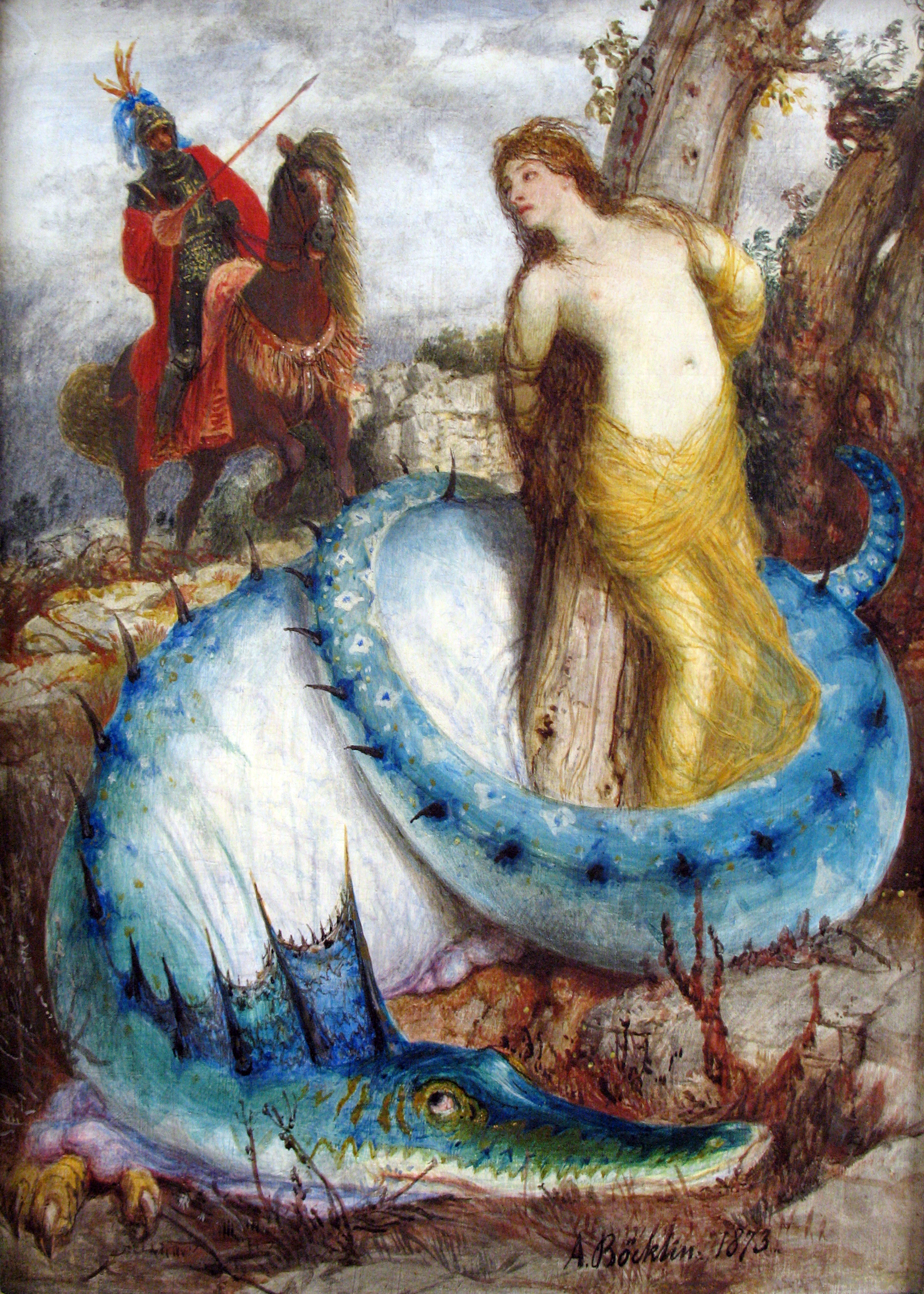
- Artist: Arnold Böcklin
- Year: 1873
- Medium: Oil on canvas
- Dimensions: 46 cm × 73 cm (18 in × 29 in)
- Location: Alte Nationalgalerie; Berlin

Roger Freeing Angelica is an oil painting executed in 1873 by Swiss symbolist painter Arnold Böcklin. The painting illustrates a scene from Ariosto's epic Orlando Furioso, in which the Muslim knight Roger (Italian: Ruggiero) saves the pagan princess Angelica from a sea monster. The motif is closely related to the mythological theme of Perseus saving Andromeda.

== Background ==
Symbolist art was a late 19th-century art movement, mainly originating in German and French speaking countries, with Brussels as one of the leading centers. Since the movement was initiated by and closely related to literature, poetry and music, symbolist painters often chose their motives from these areas. The style is characterized as: "refined, elegant, subtle, intellectual, and elitist".

== Theme ==
The motif is inspired from one of the main characters in Orlando Furioso, the 16th-century Italian romantic epic poem by Ludovico Ariosto, a poem that has exerted a wide influence in the European literature. Roger (Ruggiero) is in love with the Christian woman Bradamante, who is a warrior and knight herself. The two lovers are separated many times in the story. Roger, originally a Muslim warrior fighting the Franks, has himself baptized to be able to marry Bradamante, who refuses otherwise to marry him. Both Roland (Orlando) and Rinaldo are in love with the Chinese princess Angelica.

"Bound to the naked rock upon the strand
In the isle of tears; for the isle of tears was height,
That which was peopled by the inhuman band,
So passing fierce and full of foul despite"...

In the tenth canto of the poem, Roger is riding in Brittany on a hippogriff when he discovers Angelica, naked and chained to a rock, who has been bound there as a sacrifice to a water-dwelling orc, and saves her.

== See also ==
- List of paintings by Arnold Böcklin
- Roger Freeing Angelica (Ingres)
