= Roger Freeing Angelica (Ingres) =

1819 painting by Jean-Auguste-Dominique Ingres

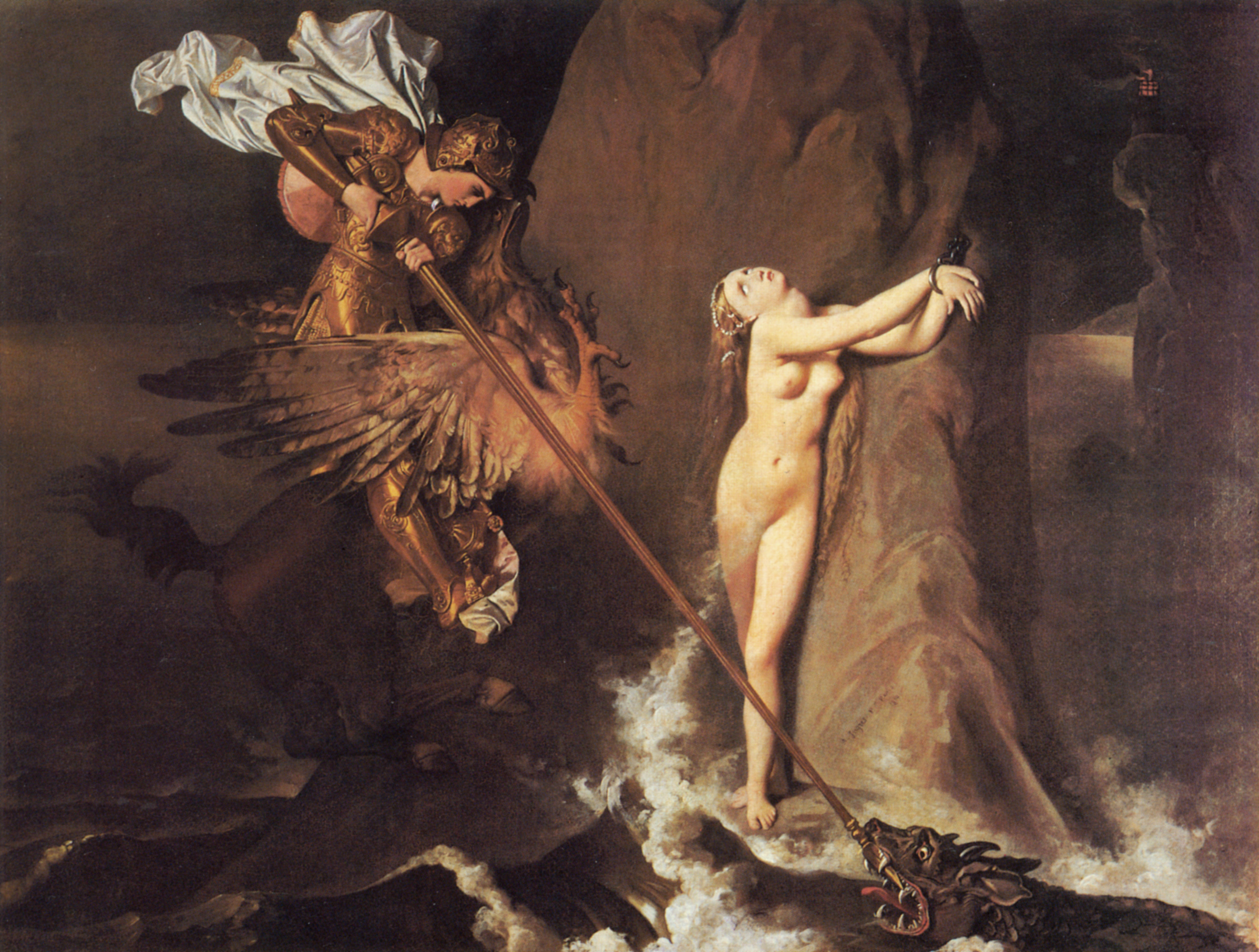
Jean-Auguste-Dominique Ingres, Roger Freeing Angelica, 1819

Roger Freeing Angelica or Ruggiero Freeing Angelica is an 1819 painting by the French artist Jean-Auguste-Dominique Ingres, inspired by Orlando Furioso by Ariosto. An oil painting on canvas measuring 147 x 199 cm, it is owned by the Louvre. Ingres subsequently painted several variants of the composition.

== Subject ==
Orlando Furioso, a 16th-century epic poem by Ariosto, is the source of the tale of Roger, a knight whose steed is a hippogriff (a legendary creature half horse and half eagle). While riding near Brittany's coast Roger espies a beautiful woman, Angelica, chained to a rock on the Isle of Tears. She has been abducted and stripped naked by barbarians who have left her there as a human sacrifice to a sea monster. As Roger rides to her aid, a great thrashing in the water occurs—it is the monster approaching Angelica. Roger drives his lance between the monster's eyes and rescues Angelica. The story is a variant of the Greek myth of Perseus and Andromeda.

== Background ==
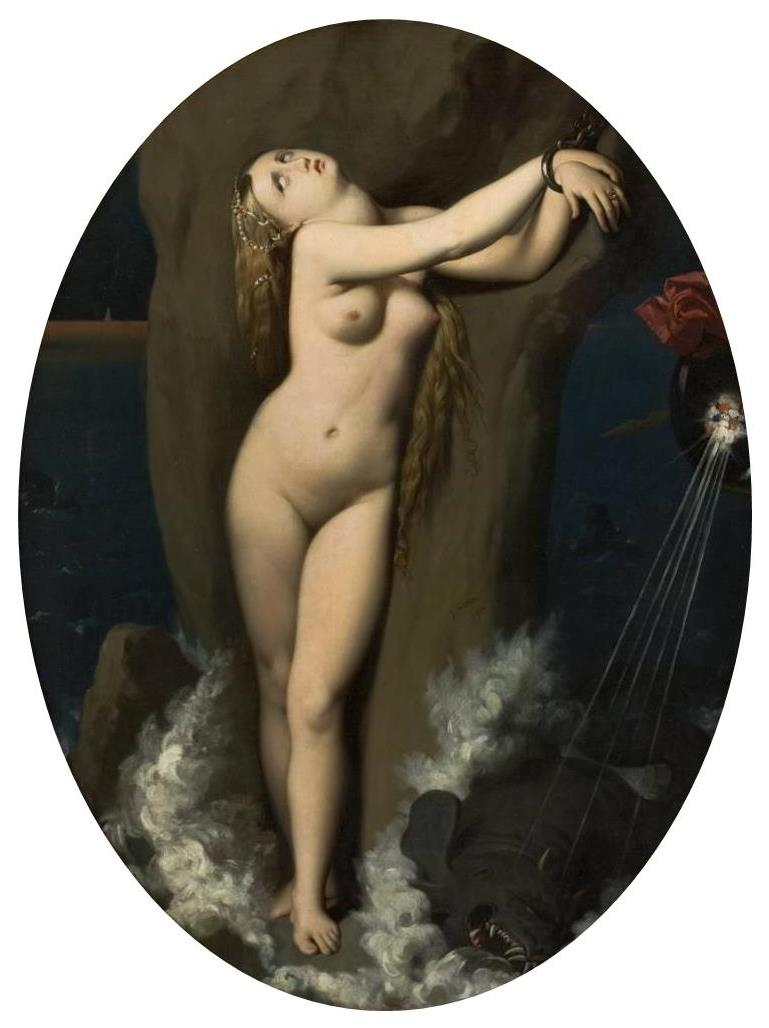
Angelica, 1859, São Paulo Museum of Art

Ingres received the commission for the work in 1817 and completed it in 1819. When it was exhibited at the Paris Salon of 1819 alongside his Grande Odalisque, the work was criticised for the treatment of Angelica's figure, described by the art historian Théophile Silvestre as "Angelica with goitres" and by the painter Henry de Waroquier as "triple-breasted Angelica". Comte de Blacas, the French ambassador to the Vatican, acquired the painting for King Louis XVIII. It was installed above a doorway in the throne room of Versailles from 1820 until 1823 before being relocated to the Musée du Luxembourg. It was Ingres' first painting to enter a public collection.

Ingres executed the work with his usual care, and many preparatory drawings for the composition and the individual figures exist.

He painted several later versions of the composition, none of which are known to have been commissioned. A reduced copy of the painting in a vertical format was painted sometime before 1839, and eventually acquired by Edgar Degas, who purchased it in 1894. It was later acquired by the National Gallery, London. An 1841 replica, in an oval format, is in the Musée Ingres. A painting of 1859, also in an oval format, repeats the figure of Angelica but nearly eliminates Roger, whose presence is indicated only by his shield visible at the right edge.

In 1819 Ingres painted Perseus and Andromeda (Detroit Institute of Arts), which like Roger Freeing Angelica features a nude woman chained to a rock and a hero slaying a sea monster.

== See also ==
- List of paintings by Jean-Auguste-Dominique Ingres
- Roger Freeing Angelica (Böcklin)
