= Personifications of death =

Anthropomorphized depiction of life's end

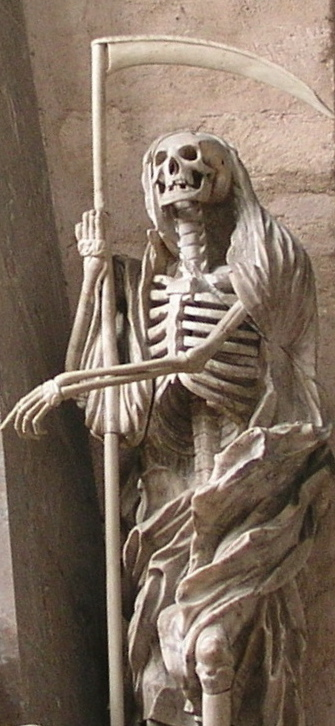
Statue of Death, personified as a skeletal Grim Reaper dressed in a shroud and clutching a scythe, at the Cathedral of Trier in Trier, Germany

Personifications of death are found in many religions and mythologies. In more modern stories, a character known as the Grim Reaper (usually depicted as a robed skeleton wielding a scythe) causes the victim's death by coming to collect that person's soul. Other beliefs hold that the spectre of death is only a psychopomp, a benevolent figure who serves to gently sever the last ties between the soul and the body, and to guide the deceased to the afterlife, without having any control over when or how the victim dies. Death is most often personified in male form, although in certain cultures death is perceived as female (for instance, Marzanna in Slavic mythology, or Santa Muerte in Mexico). Death is also portrayed as one of the Four Horsemen of the Apocalypse. Most claims of its appearance occur in states of near-death.

== By region ==
=== Americas ===
==== Spanish Latin America ====
As is the case in many Romance languages (including French, Portuguese, Italian, and Romanian), the Spanish word for death, muerte, is (like Latin mors/mortis whence it derives) a feminine noun. As such, it is common in Spanish-speaking cultures to personify death as a female figure. A common term for the personification of death across Latin America is "la Parca" from one of the three Roman Parcae, a figure similar to the Anglophone Grim Reaper, though usually depicted as female and without a scythe.

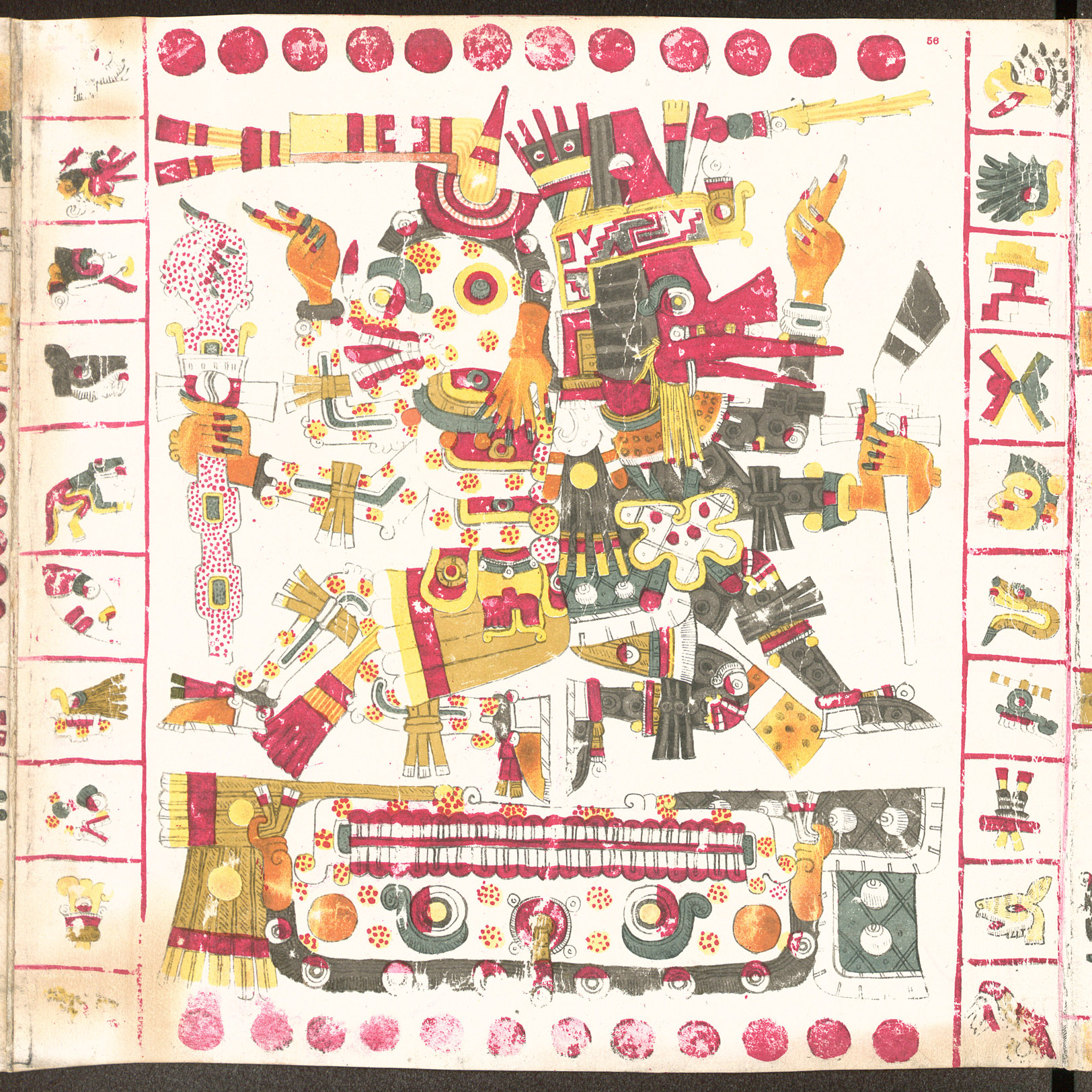
Mictlantecutli in the Codex Borgia

In Aztec mythology, Mictecacihuatl is the "Queen of Mictlan" (the Aztec underworld), ruling over the afterlife with her husband, Mictlantecuhtli. Other epithets for her include "Lady of the Dead," as her role includes keeping watch over the bones of the dead. Mictecacihuatl was represented with a fleshless body and with jaw agape to swallow the stars during the day. She presided over the ancient festivals of the dead, which evolved from Aztec traditions into the modern Day of the Dead after synthesis with Spanish cultural traditions. Mictlāntēcutli, is the Aztec god of the dead and the king of Mictlan, depicted as a skeleton or a person wearing a toothy skull. He is one of the principal gods of the Aztecs and is the most prominent of several gods and goddesses of death and the underworld. His headdress was shown decorated with owl feathers and paper banners and he wore a necklace of human eyeballs, while his earspools were made from human bones. He was not the only Aztec god to be depicted in this fashion, as numerous other deities had skulls for heads or else wore clothing or decorations that incorporated bones and skulls. In the Aztec world, skeletal imagery was a symbol of fertility, health and abundance, alluding to the close symbolic links between life and death. There was also the goddess of suicide, Ixtab. She was a minor goddess in the scale of Maya mythology. She was also known as the Hangwoman as she came to help along those who had killed themselves.

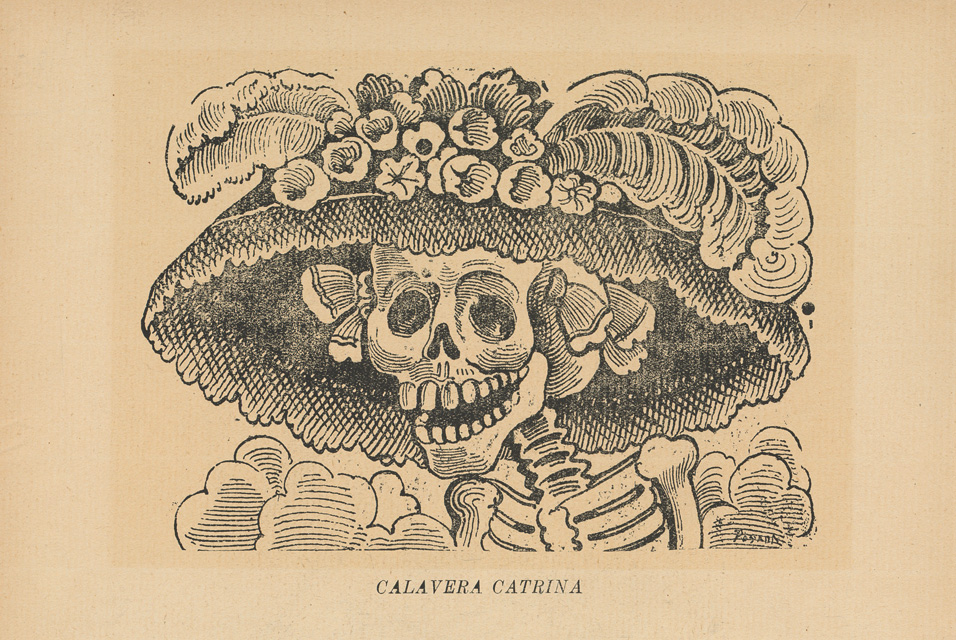
La Calavera Catrina, one of José Guadalupe Posada's Catrina engravings (1910–1913)

Our Lady of the Holy Death (Santa Muerte) is a female deity or folk saint of Mexican folk religion, whose popularity has been growing in Mexico and the United States in recent years. Since the pre-Columbian era, Mexican culture has maintained a certain reverence towards death, as seen in the widespread commemoration of the Day of the Dead. La Calavera Catrina, a character symbolizing death, is also an icon of the Mexican Day of the Dead.

San La Muerte (lit. 'Saint Death') is a skeletal folk saint venerated in Paraguay, northeast Argentina. As the result of internal migration in Argentina since the 1960s, the veneration of San La Muerte has been extended to Greater Buenos Aires and the national prison system as well. Saint Death is depicted as a male skeleton figure usually holding a scythe. Although the Catholic Church in Mexico has attacked the devotion of Saint Death as a tradition that mixes paganism with Christianity and is contrary to the Christian belief of Jesus defeating death, many devotees consider the veneration of San La Muerte as being part of their Catholic faith. The rituals connected and powers ascribed to San La Muerte are very similar to those of Santa Muerte; the resemblance between their names, however, is coincidental.

In Guatemala, San Pascualito is a skeletal folk saint venerated as "King of the Graveyard." He is depicted as a skeletal figure with a scythe, sometimes wearing a cape and crown. He is associated with death and the curing of diseases.

In Haitian Vodou, the Gede are a family of spirits that embody death and fertility. The most well-known of these spirits is Baron Samedi.

==== South America ====
In the Afro-American religion Umbanda, which originated at the start of the twentieth century in Brazil, the orixá Omolu personifies sickness, death, as well as healing. The image of the death is also associated with Exu, lord of the crossroads, who rules cemeteries and the hour of midnight.

=== Asia ===
==== East Asia ====
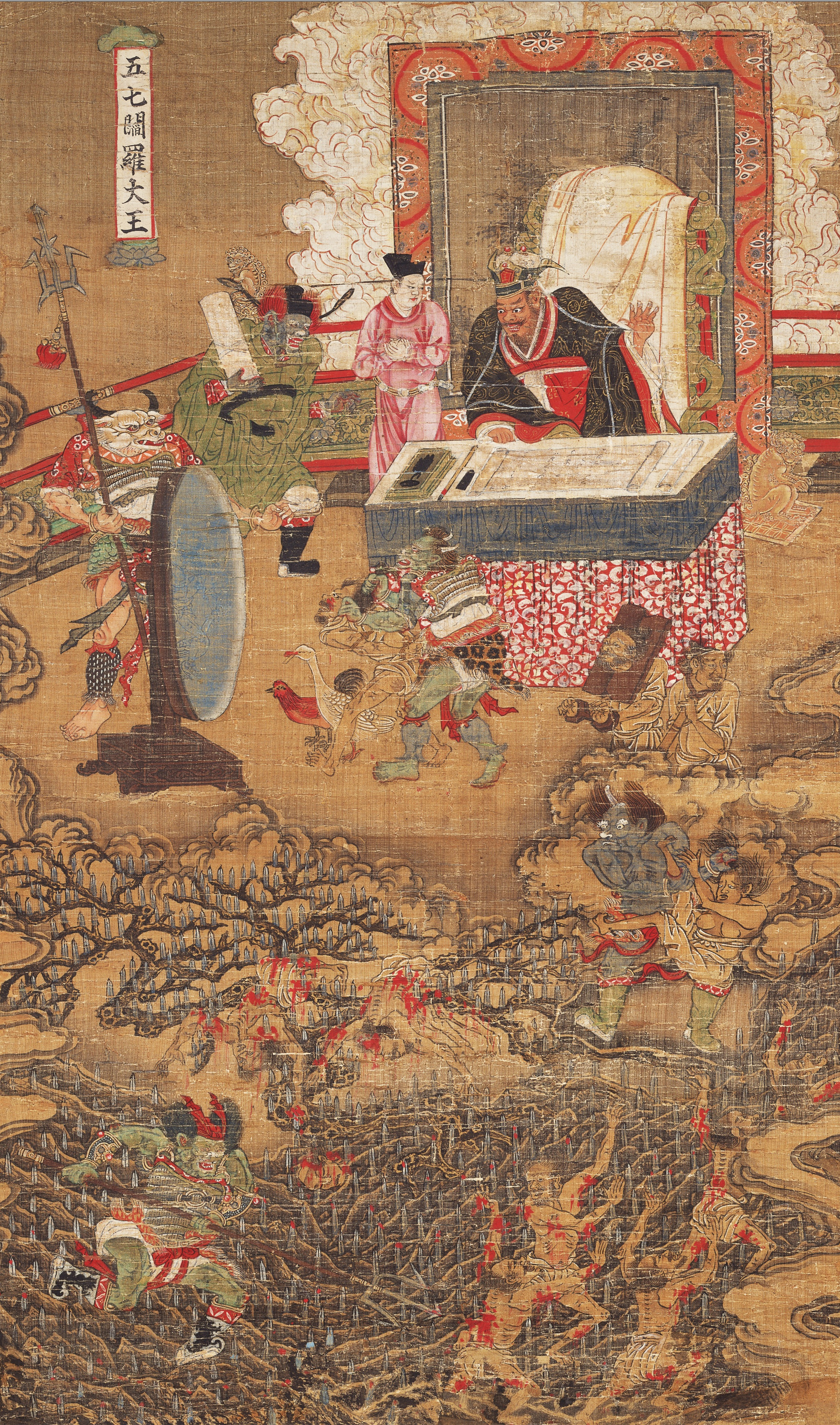
A depiction of Yanluo, one of the Ten Kings of Hell.

Yama was introduced to Chinese mythology through Buddhism. In China, he is known as Yanluo Wang (traditional Chinese: 閻羅王; simplified Chinese: 阎罗王; pinyin: Yánluó Wáng) or Yan Wang (traditional Chinese: 閻王; simplified Chinese: 阎王; pinyin: Yán Wáng), ruling the ten gods of the underworld Diyu. He is normally depicted wearing a Chinese judge's cap and traditional Chinese robes and appears on most forms of hell money offered in ancestor worship. From China, Yama spread to Japan as the Great King Enma (閻魔大王, Enma-Dai-Ō), ruler of Jigoku (地獄); Korea as the Great King Yeomra (Korean: 염라대왕), ruler of Jiok (지옥); and Vietnam as Diêm La Vương, ruler of Địa Ngục or Âm Phủ.

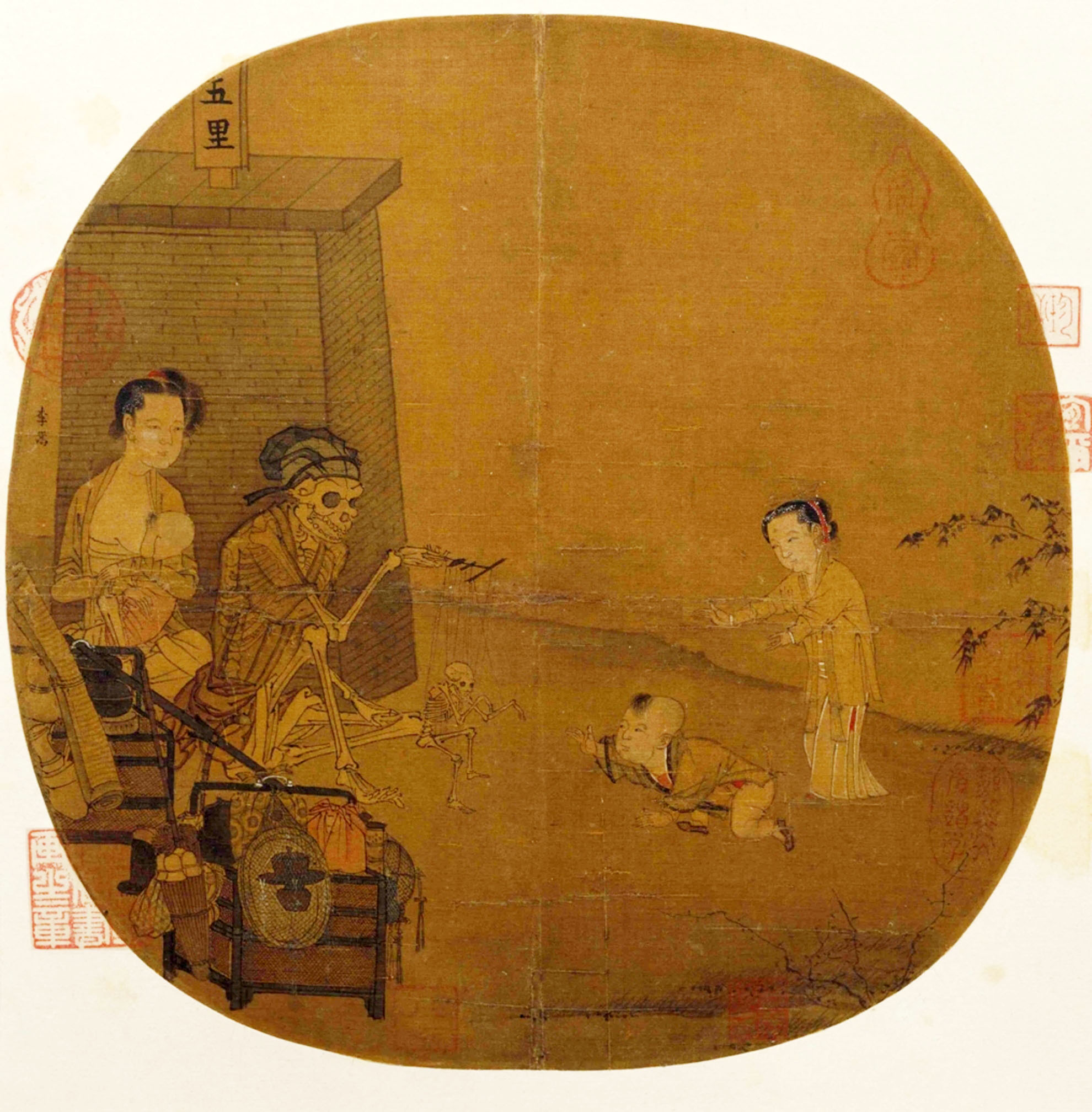
Skeleton Fantasy Show by Li Song (1190–1264)

Separately, in Korean mythology, death's principal figure is the "Netherworld Emissary" Jeoseung Saja (저승사자; often abbreviated as Saja [사자]). He is depicted as a stern and ruthless bureaucrat in Yeomra Daewang's service. A psychopomp, he escorts all—good or evil—from the land of the living to the netherworld when the time comes. One of the representative names of Jeoseung Saja is Ganglim Doryeong (Korean: 강림도령; Hanja: 降臨道令), who guides the soul to the entrance of the underworld. According to legend, he always carries Jeokpaeji (적패지), the list with the names of the dead written on a red cloth. When he calls the name of Jeokpaeji three times, the soul leaves the body and follows him inevitably.

The Kojiki relates that the Japanese goddess Izanami-no-Mikoto was burnt to death giving birth to the fire god Hinokagutsuchi. She then entered a realm of perpetual night called Yomi-no-Kuni. Her husband, Izanagi, pursued her there but discovered his wife was no longer as beautiful as before. After an argument, she promised she would take a thousand lives every day, becoming a goddess of death, as well as giving birth to the gods Raijin and Fūjin while dead. There are also death gods called shinigami (死神), which are closer to the Western tradition of the Grim Reaper; while common in modern Japanese arts and fiction, they were essentially absent in traditional mythology.

==== India ====
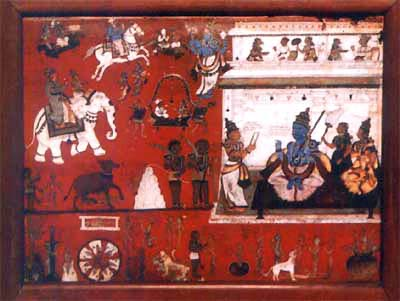
Yama, the Hindu lord of death, presiding over his court in hell

The Sanskrit word for death is mrityu (cognate with Latin mors and Lithuanian mirtis), which is often personified in Dharmic religions.

In Hindu scriptures, the lord of death is called King Yama (यम राज, Yama Rāja). He is also known as the King of Karmic Justice (Dharmaraja) as one's karma at death was considered to lead to a just rebirth. Yama rides a black buffalo and carries a rope lasso to lead the soul back to his home, called Naraka, pathalloka, or Yamaloka. There are many forms of reapers, although some say there is only one who disguises himself as a small child. His agents, the Yamadutas, carry souls back to Yamalok. There, all the accounts of a person's good and bad deeds are stored and maintained by Chitragupta. The balance of these deeds allows Yama to decide where the soul should reside in its next life, following the theory of reincarnation. Yama is also mentioned in the Mahabharata as a great philosopher and devotee of the Supreme Brahman.

==== Western Asia ====
The Canaanites of the 12th- and 13th-century BC Levant personified death as the god Mot (lit. "Death"). He was considered a son of the king of the gods, El. His contest with the storm god Baʿal forms part of the Ba'al Cycle from the Ugaritic texts. The Phoenicians also worshipped death under the name Mot and a version of Mot later became Maweth, the devil or angel of death in Judaism.

=== Europe ===
==== Baltic ====
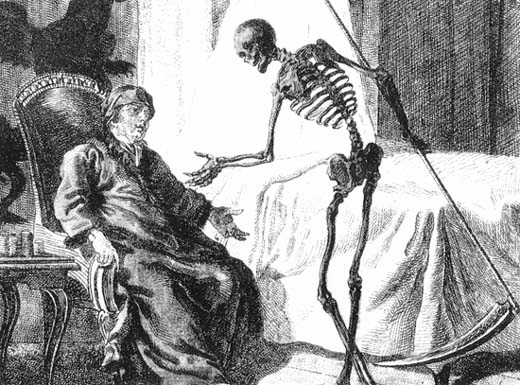
A European depiction of Death as a skeleton wielding a scythe

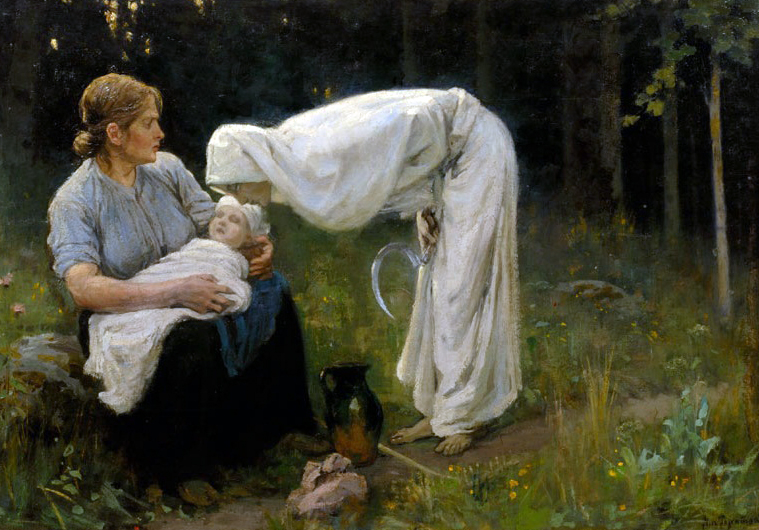
"Death" (Nāve; 1897) by Janis Rozentāls

Latvians named Death Veļu māte, but for Lithuanians it was Giltinė, deriving from the word gelti ("to sting"). Giltinė was viewed as an old, ugly woman with a long blue nose and a deadly venomous tongue. The legend tells that Giltinė was young, pretty, and communicative until she was trapped in a coffin for seven years. Her sister was the goddess of life and destiny, Laima, symbolizing the relationship between beginning and end.

Like the Scandinavians, Lithuanians and Latvians later began using Grim Reaper imagery for death.

==== Celtic ====
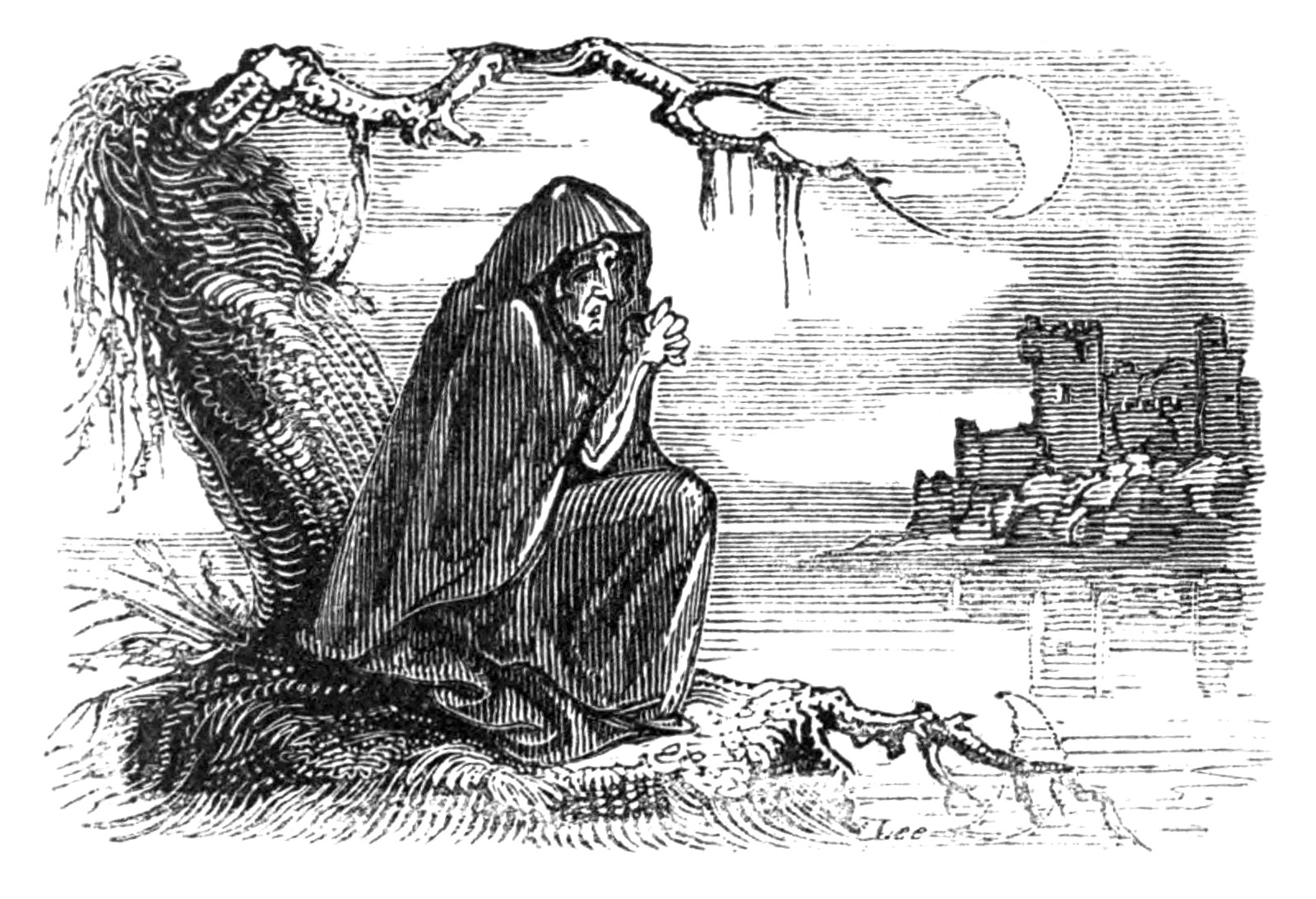
Bunworth Banshee, "Fairy Legends and Traditions of the South of Ireland", by Thomas Crofton Croker, 1825

In Breton folklore, a spectral figure called the Ankou (or Angau in Welsh) portends death. Usually, the Ankou is the spirit of the last person that died within the community and appears as a tall, haggard figure with a wide hat and long white hair or a skeleton with a revolving head. The Ankou drives a deathly wagon or cart with a creaking axle. The cart or wagon is piled high with corpses and a stop at a cabin means instant death for those inside.

Irish mythology features a similar creature known as a dullahan, whose head would be tucked under their arm (dullahans were not one, but an entire species). The head was said to have large eyes and a smile that could reach the head's ears. The dullahan would ride a black horse or a carriage pulled by black horses, and stop at the house of someone about to die, and call their name, and immediately the person would die. The dullahan did not like being watched, and it was believed that if a dullahan knew someone was watching them, they would lash that person's eyes with their whip, which was made from a spine; or they would toss a basin of blood on the person, which was a sign that the person was next to die.

Gaelic lore also involves a female spirit known as Banshee (Modern Irish Gaelic: bean sí pron. banshee, literally fairy woman), who heralds the death of a person by shrieking or keening. The banshee is often described as wearing red or green, usually with long, disheveled hair. She can appear in a variety of forms, typically that of an ugly, frightful hag, but in some stories she chooses to appear young and beautiful. Some tales recount that the creature was actually a ghost, often of a specific murdered woman or a mother who died in childbirth. When several banshees appeared at once, it was said to indicate the death of someone great or holy. In Ireland and parts of Scotland, a traditional part of mourning is the keening woman (bean chaointe), who wails a lament – in Irish: Caoineadh, caoin meaning "to weep, to wail."

In Scottish folklore there was a belief that a black, dark green or white dog known as a Cù Sìth took dying souls to the afterlife. Comparable figures exist in Irish and Welsh stories.

In Welsh Folklore, Gwyn ap Nudd is the escort of the grave, the personification of Death and Winter who leads the Wild Hunt to collect wayward souls and escort them to the Otherworld, sometimes it is Maleagant, Arawn or Afallach in a similar position.

==== Hellenic ====
In Greek mythology, Thanatos, the personification of death, is one of the offspring of Nyx (Night). Like her, he is seldom portrayed directly. He sometimes appears in art as a winged and bearded man, and occasionally as a winged and beardless youth. When he appears together with his twin brother, Hypnos, the god of sleep, Thanatos generally represents a gentle death. Thanatos, led by Hermes psychopompos, takes the shade of the deceased to the near shore of the river Styx, whence the ferryman Charon, on payment of a small fee, conveys the shade to Hades, the realm of the dead. Homer's Iliad 16.681, and the Euphronios Krater's depiction of the same episode, have Apollo instruct the removal of the heroic, semi-divine Sarpedon's body from the battlefield by Hypnos and Thanatos, and conveyed thence to his homeland for proper funeral rites. Among the other children of Nyx are Thanatos' sisters, the Keres, blood-drinking, vengeful spirits of violent or untimely death, portrayed as fanged and taloned, with bloody garments.

==== Scandinavia ====
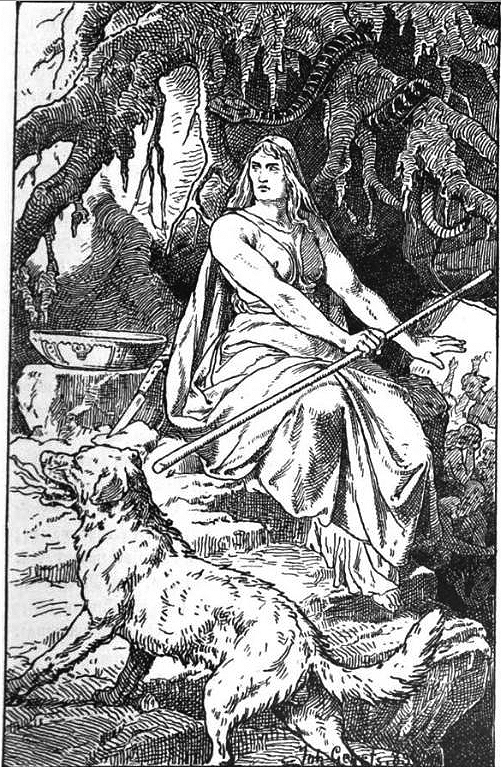
Hel (1889) by Johannes Gehrts, pictured here with her hound Garmr

In Scandinavia, Norse mythology personified death in the shape of Hel, the goddess of death and ruler over the realm of the same name, where she received a portion of the dead. In the times of the Black Plague, Death would often be depicted as an old woman known by the name of Pesta, meaning "plague hag", wearing a black hood. She would go into a town carrying either a rake or a broom. If she brought the rake, some people would survive the plague; if she brought the broom, however, everyone would die.

Scandinavians later adopted the Grim Reaper with a scythe and black robe. Today, Ingmar Bergman's 1957 film The Seventh Seal features one of the world's most famous representations of this personification of Death.

==== Slavic ====
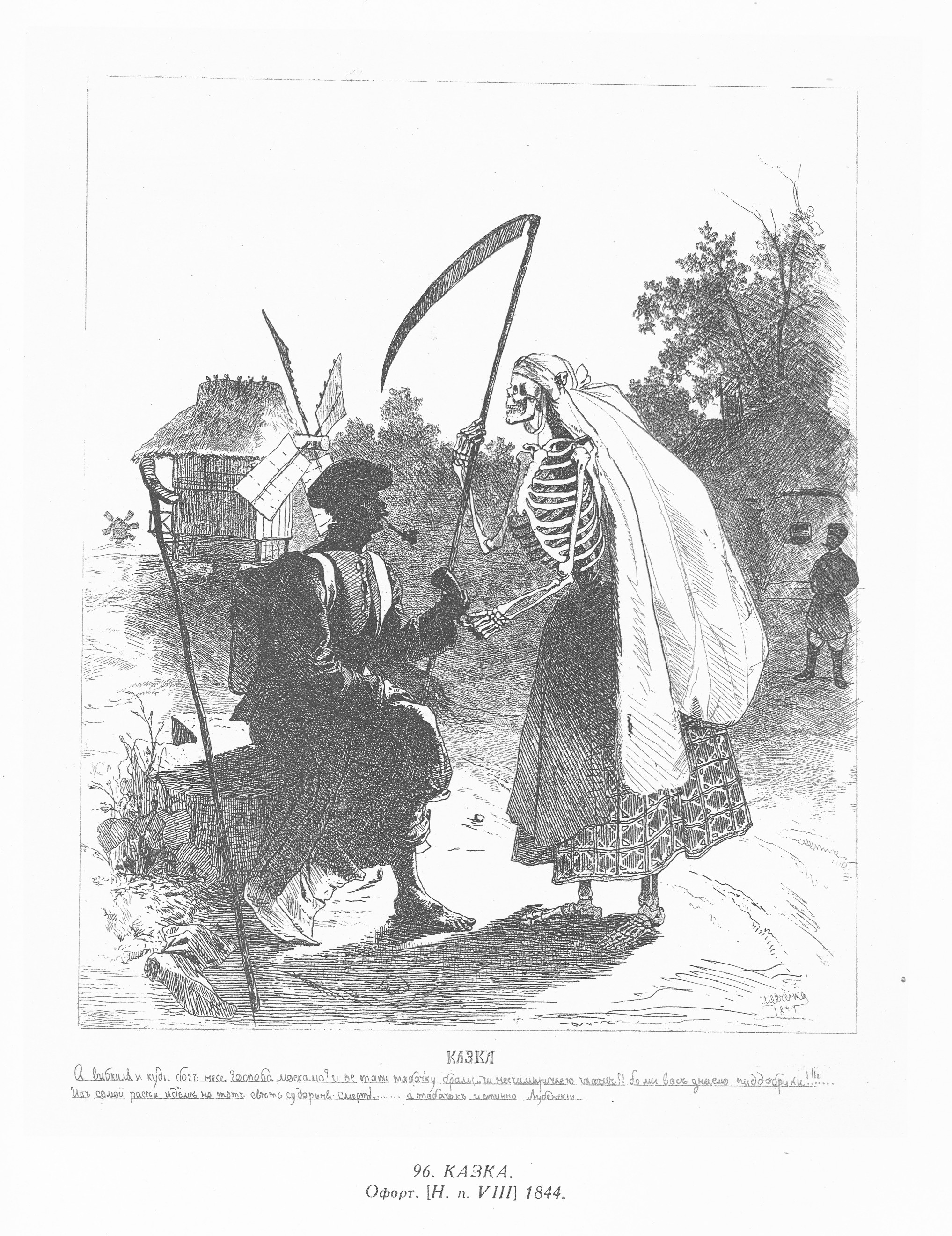
"Fairy tale", drawing by Taras Shevchenko. Death is depicted as a female skeleton with a scythe.

In Poland, Death – Śmierć or kostucha – has an appearance similar to the Grim Reaper, although its robe was traditionally white instead of black. Because the word śmierć is feminine in gender, death is frequently portrayed as a skeletal old woman, as depicted in 15th-century dialogue "Rozmowa Mistrza Polikarpa ze Śmiercią" (Latin: "Dialogus inter Mortem et Magistrum Polikarpum").

In Serbia and other South Slavic countries, the Grim Reaper is well known as Smrt ("Death") or Kosač ("Reaper"). Slavic people found this very similar to the Devil and other dark powers. One popular saying about death is: Smrt ne bira ni vreme, ni mesto, ni godinu ("Death does not choose a time, place or year" – which means death is destiny.)

Morana is a Slavic goddess of winter time, death and rebirth. A figurine of the same name is traditionally created at the end of winter/beginning of spring and symbolically taken away from villages to be set in fire and/or thrown into a river, that takes her away from the world of the living.

In Czechia, the medieval Prague Astronomical Clock carries a depiction of Death striking the hour. A version first appeared in 1490.

==== The Low Countries ====
In the Netherlands, and to a lesser extent in Belgium, the personification of Death is known as Magere Hein ("Thin Hein") or Pietje de Dood ("Peter the Death"). Historically, he was sometimes simply referred to as Hein or variations thereof such as Heintje, Heintjeman and Oom Hendrik ("Uncle Hendrik"). Related archaic terms are Beenderman ("Bone-man"), Scherminkel (very meager person, "skeleton") and Maaijeman ("mow-man", a reference to his scythe).

The concept of Magere Hein predates Christianity, but was Christianized and likely gained its modern name and features (scythe, skeleton, black robe etc.) during the Middle Ages. The designation "Meager" comes from its portrayal as a skeleton, which was largely influenced by the Christian "Dance of Death" (Dutch: dodendans) theme that was prominent in Europe during the late Middle Ages. "Hein" was a Middle Dutch name originating as a short form of Heinric (see Henry (given name)). Its use was possibly related to the comparable German concept of "Freund Hein." Notably, many of the names given to Death can also refer to the Devil; it is likely that fear of death led to Hein's character being merged with that of Satan.

In Belgium, this personification of Death is now commonly called Pietje de Dood "Little Pete, the Death." Like the other Dutch names, it can also refer to the Devil.

==== Western Europe ====
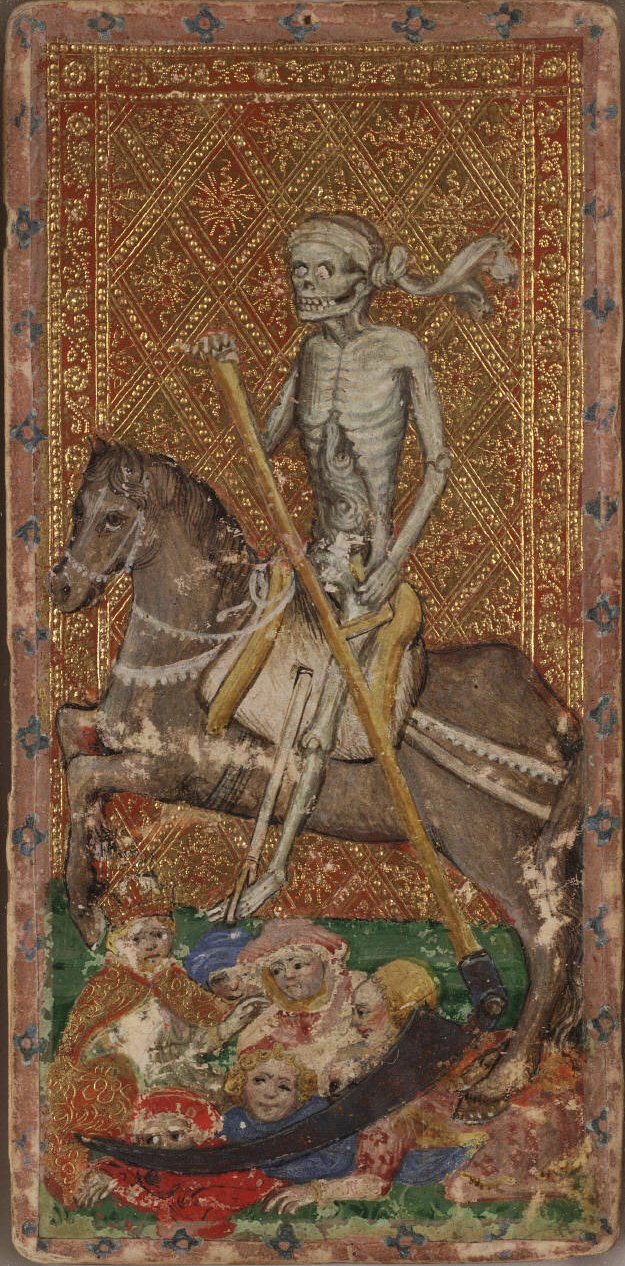
Death from the Cary-Yale Tarot Deck (15th century)

In Western Europe, Death has commonly been personified as an animated skeleton since the Middle Ages. This character, which is often depicted wielding a scythe, is said to collect the souls of the dying or recently dead. In English and German culture, Death is typically portrayed as male, but in French, Spanish, and Italian culture, it is not uncommon for Death to be female.

In England, the personified "Death" featured in medieval morality plays, later regularly appearing in traditional folk songs. The following is a verse of "The Great Messenger of Mortality, or a Dialogue betwixt Death and a Lady" as written in a broadside in the Roxburghe Collection between 1683 and 1700

Fair lady, throw those costly robes aside,
No longer may you glory in your pride.
Take leave of all sour carnal vain delight
I'm come to summon you away this night.

In the late 1800s, the character of Death became known as the Grim Reaper in English literature. The earliest appearance of the name "Grim Reaper" in English is in the 1847 book The Circle of Human Life:

All know full well that life cannot last above seventy, or at the most eighty years. If we reach that term without meeting the grim reaper with his scythe, there or there about, meet him we surely shall.

== In Abrahamic religions ==
The "Angel of the Lord" smites 185,000 men in the Assyrian camp (II Kings 19:35). When the Angel of Death passes through to smite the Egyptian first-born, God prevents "the destroyer" (shâchath) from entering houses with blood on the lintel and side posts (Exodus 12:23). The "destroying angel" (mal'ak ha-mashḥit) rages among the people in Jerusalem (II Sam. 24:16). In I Chronicles 21:15 the "angel of the Lord" is seen by King David standing "between the earth and the heaven, having a drawn sword in his hand stretched out over Jerusalem." The biblical Book of Job (33:22) uses the general term "destroyers" (memitim), which tradition has identified with "destroying angels" (mal'ake Khabbalah), and Prov. 16:14 uses the term the "angels of death" (mal'ake ha-mavet). The angel Azra'il is sometimes referred as the Angel of Death as well.

Jewish tradition also refers to Death as the Angel of Dark and Light, a name which stems from Talmudic lore. There is also a reference to "Abaddon" (The Destroyer), an angel who is known as the "Angel of the Abyss". In Talmudic lore, he is characterized as archangel Michael.

=== In Judaism ===
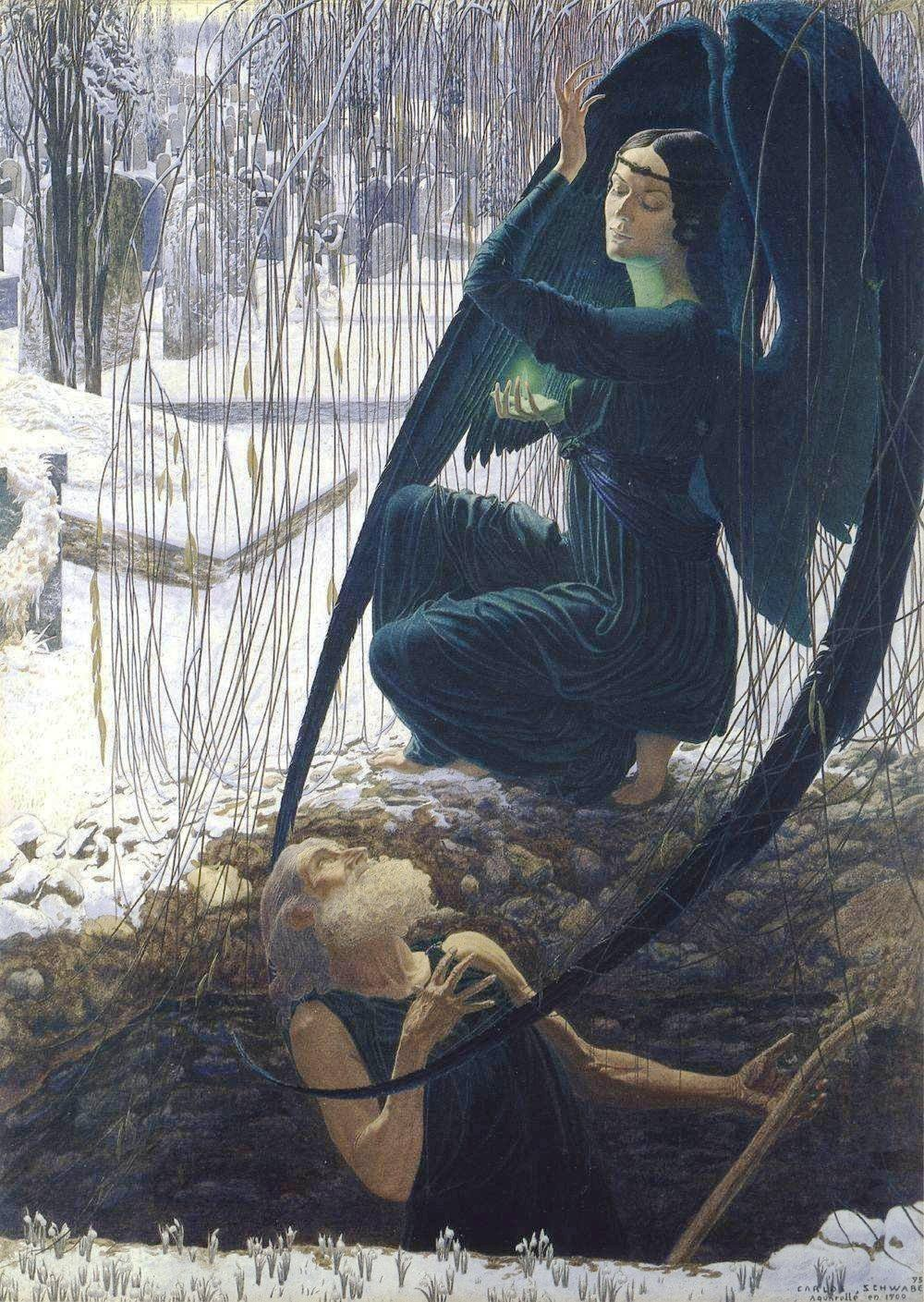
La mort du fossoyeur (Death of the gravedigger) by Carlos Schwabe

In Hebrew scriptures, Death (Maweth/Mavet(h)) is sometimes personified as a devil or angel of death (e.g., Habakkuk 2:5; Job 18:13). In both the Book of Hosea and the Book of Jeremiah, Maweth/Mot is mentioned as a deity to whom God can turn over Judah as punishment for worshiping other gods. The memitim are a type of angel from biblical lore associated with the mediation over the lives of the dying. The name is derived from the Hebrew word מְמִיתִים (mᵊmītīm – "executioners", "slayers", "destroyers") and refers to angels that brought about the destruction of those whom the guardian angels no longer protected. While there may be some debate among religious scholars regarding the exact nature of the memitim, it is generally accepted that, as described in the Book of Job 33:22, they are killers of some sort.

==== Form and functions ====
According to the Midrash, the Angel of Death was created by God on the first day. His dwelling is in heaven, whence he reaches earth in eight flights, whereas Pestilence reaches it in one. He has twelve wings. "Over all people have I surrendered thee the power," said God to the Angel of Death, "only not over this one [i.e. Moses] which has received freedom from death through the Law." It is said of the Angel of Death that he is full of eyes. In the hour of death, he stands at the head of the departing one with a drawn sword, to which clings a drop of gall. As soon as the dying man sees Death, he is seized with a convulsion and opens his mouth, whereupon Death throws the drop into it. This drop causes his death; he turns putrid, and his face becomes yellow. The expression "the taste of death" originated in the idea that death was caused by a drop of gall.

The soul escapes through the mouth, or, as is stated in another place, through the throat; therefore, the Angel of Death stands at the head of the patient (Adolf Jellinek, l.c. ii. 94, Midr. Teh. to Ps. xi.). When the soul forsakes the body, its voice goes from one end of the world to the other, but is not heard (Gen. R. vi. 7; Ex. R. v. 9; Pirḳe R. El. xxxiv.). The drawn sword of the Angel of Death, mentioned by the Chronicler (I. Chron. 21:15; comp. Job 15:22; Enoch 62:11), indicates that the Angel of Death was figured as a warrior who kills off the children of men. "Man, on the day of his death, falls down before the Angel of Death like a beast before the slaughterer" (Grünhut, "Liḳḳuṭim", v. 102a). R. Samuel's father (c. 200) said: "The Angel of Death said to me, 'Only for the sake of the honor of mankind do I not tear off their necks as is done to slaughtered beasts'" ('Ab. Zarah 20b). In later representations, the knife sometimes replaces the sword, and reference is also made to the cord of the Angel of Death, which indicates death by throttling. Moses says to God: "I fear the cord of the Angel of Death" (Grünhut, l.c. v. 103a et seq.). Of the four Jewish methods of execution, three are named in connection with the Angel of Death: Burning (by pouring hot lead down the victim's throat), slaughtering (by beheading), and throttling. The Angel of Death administers the particular punishment that God has ordained for the commission of sin.

A peculiar mantle ("idra" – according to Levy, "Neuhebr. Wörterb." i. 32, a sword) belongs to the equipment of the Angel of Death (Eccl. R. iv. 7). The Angel of Death takes on the particular form which will best serve his purpose; e.g., he appears to a scholar in the form of a beggar imploring pity (the beggar should receive Tzedakah)(M. Ḳ. 28a). "When pestilence rages in the town, walk not in the middle of the street, because the Angel of Death [i.e., pestilence] strides there; if peace reigns in the town, walk not on the edges of the road. When pestilence rages in the town, go not alone to the synagogue, because there the Angel of Death stores his tools. If the dogs howl, the Angel of Death has entered the city; if they make sport, the prophet Elijah has come" (B. Ḳ. 60b). The "destroyer" (saṭan ha-mashḥit) in the daily prayer is the Angel of Death (Ber. 16b). Midr. Ma'ase Torah (compare Jellinek, "B. H." ii. 98) says: "There are six Angels of Death: Gabriel over kings; Ḳapẓiel over youths; Mashbir over animals; Mashḥit over children; Af and Ḥemah over man and beast."

Samael is considered in Talmudic texts to be a member of the heavenly host with often grim and destructive duties. One of Samael's greatest roles in Jewish lore is that of the main angel of death and the head of satans.

==== Scholars and the Angel of Death ====
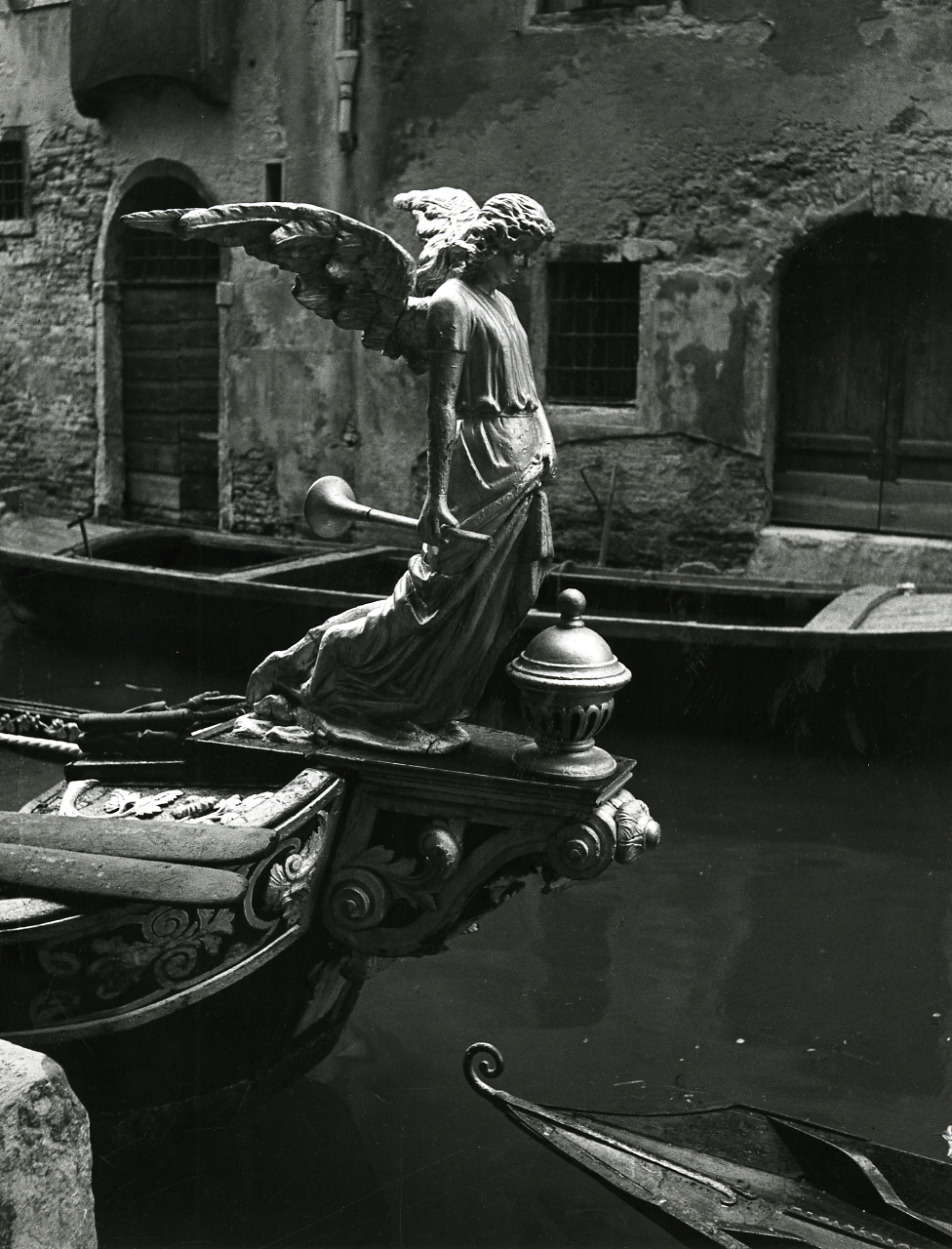
The Angel of Death, sculpture of a funeral gondola, Venice. Photo by Paolo Monti, 1951.

Talmud teachers of the 4th century associate quite familiarly with him. When he appeared to one on the street, the teacher reproached him with rushing upon him as upon a beast, whereupon the angel called upon him at his house. To another, he granted a respite of thirty days, that he might put his knowledge in order before entering the next world. To a third, he had no access, because he could not interrupt the study of the Talmud. To a fourth, he showed a rod of fire, whereby he is recognized as the Angel of Death (M. K. 28a). He often entered the house of Bibi and conversed with him (Ḥag. 4b). Often, he resorts to strategy in order to interrupt and seize his victim (B. M. 86a; Mak. 10a).

The death of Joshua ben Levi in particular is surrounded with a web of fable. When the time came for him to die and the Angel of Death appeared to him, he demanded to be shown his place in paradise. When the angel had consented to this, he demanded the angel's knife, that the angel might not frighten him by the way. This request also was granted to him, and Joshua sprang with the knife over the wall of paradise; the angel, who is not allowed to enter paradise, caught hold of the end of his garment. Joshua swore that he would not come out, and God declared that he should not leave paradise unless he had ever absolved himself of an oath; he had never absolved himself of an oath so he was allowed to remain. The Angel of Death then demanded back his knife, but Joshua refused. At this point, a heavenly voice (bat ḳol) rang out: "Give him back the knife, because the children of men have need of it will bring death." Hesitant, Joshua Ben Levi gives back the knife in exchange for the Angel of Death's name. To never forget the name, he carved Troke into his arm, the Angel of Death's chosen name. When the knife was returned to the Angel, Joshua's carving of the name faded, and he forgot. (Ket. 77b; Jellinek, l.c. ii. 48–51; Bacher, l.c. i. 192 et seq.).

==== Rabbinic views ====
The Rabbis found the Angel of Death mentioned in Psalm 89:48, where the Targum translates: "There is no man who lives and, seeing the Angel of Death, can deliver his soul from his hand." Eccl. 8:4 is thus explained in Midrash Rabbah to the passage: "One may not escape the Angel of Death, nor say to him, 'Wait until I put my affairs in order,' or 'There is my son, my slave: take him in my stead.'" Where the Angel of Death appears, there is no remedy, but his name (Talmud, Ned. 49a; Hul. 7b). If one who has sinned has confessed his fault, the Angel of Death may not touch him (Midrash Tanhuma, ed. Buber, 139). God protects from the Angel of Death (Midrash Genesis Rabbah lxviii.).

By acts of benevolence, the anger of the Angel of Death is overcome; when one fails to perform such acts the Angel of Death will make his appearance (Derek Ereẓ Zuṭa, viii.). The Angel of Death receives his orders from God (Ber. 62b). As soon as he has received permission to destroy, however, he makes no distinction between good and bad (B. Ḳ. 60a). In the city of Luz, the Angel of Death has no power, and, when the aged inhabitants are ready to die, they go outside the city (Soṭah 46b; compare Sanh. 97a). A legend to the same effect existed in Ireland in the Middle Ages (Jew. Quart. Rev. vi. 336).

=== In Christianity ===
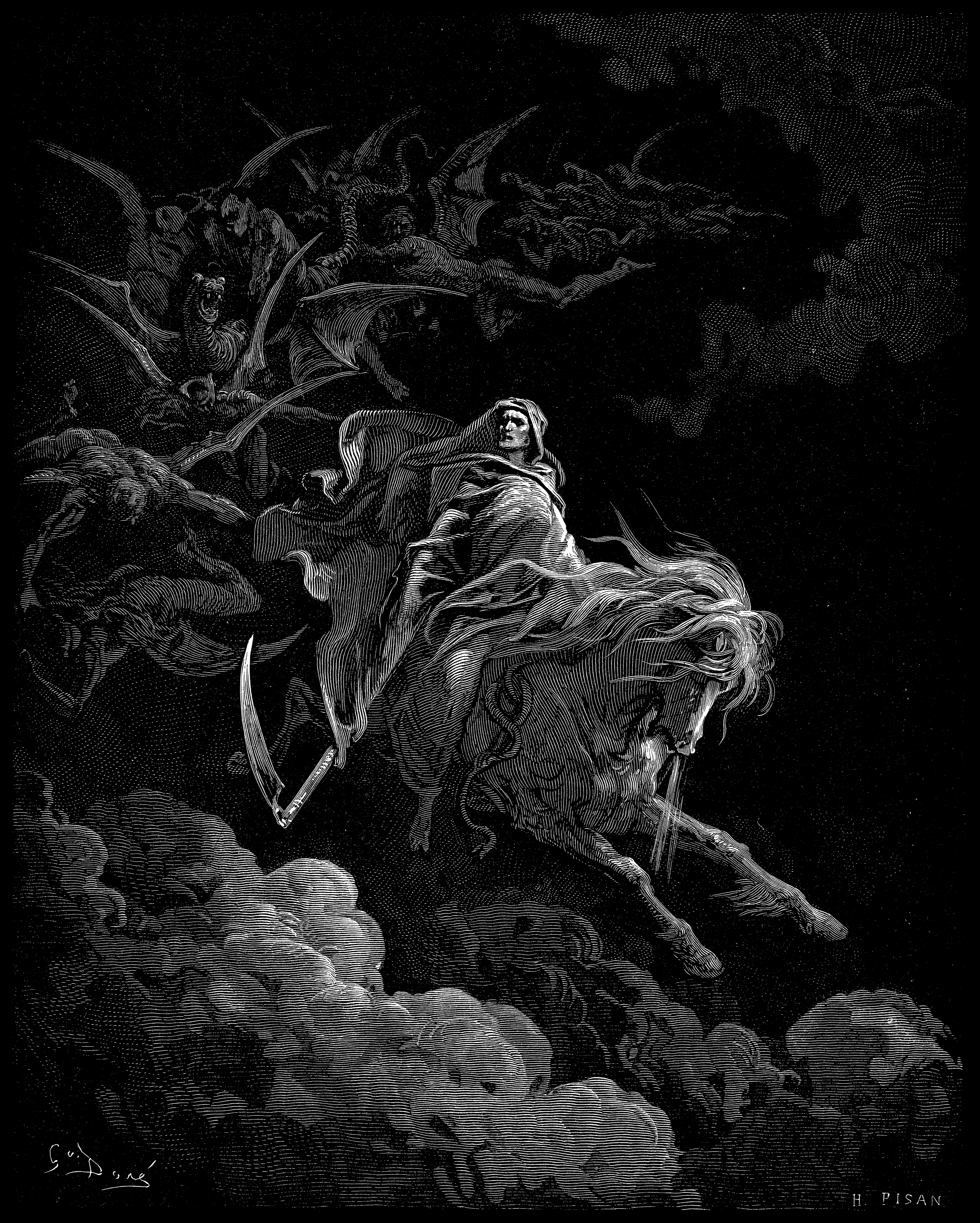
Gustave Doré Death on the Pale Horse (1865) – The fourth Horseman of the Apocalypse

Death is one of the Four Horsemen of the Apocalypse portrayed in the Book of Revelation, in Revelation 6:7–8.

And I looked, and behold a pale horse: and his name that sat on him was Death, and Hell followed with him. And power was given unto them over the fourth part of the earth, to kill with sword, and with hunger, and with death, and with the beasts of the earth.

— Revelation 6:8, King James Version

He is also known as the Pale Horseman whose name is Thanatos, the same as that of the ancient Greek personification of death, and the only one of the horsemen to be named.

Paul addresses a personified death in 1 Corinthians 15:55.

"O Death, where is your sting? O Hades, where is your victory?"

— 1 Corinthians 15:55, New King James Version

In some versions, both arms of this verse are addressed to death.

The Christian scriptures contain the first known depiction of Abaddon as an individual entity instead of a place.

A king, the angel of the bottomless pit; whose name in Hebrew is Abaddon, and in Greek Apollyon; in Latin Exterminans.

— Revelation 9:11, Douay–Rheims Bible

In Hebrews 2:14 the devil "holds the power of death."

Since therefore the children share in flesh and blood, he himself likewise partook of the same things, that through death he might destroy the one who has the power of death, that is, the devil, and deliver all those who through fear of death were subject to lifelong slavery.

— Hebrews 2:14–15, English Standard Version

Conversely, the early Christian writer Origen believed the destroying angel of Exodus 12:23 to be Satan. Death is stated to be destroyed by the Lake of Fire that burns with sulfur.

Death and Hell were thrown into the Lake of Fire. This is the second death.

— Revelation 20:14, King James Version

The last enemy to be destroyed is death.

— 1 Corinthians 15:26, New International Version

=== In Islam ===
In Islam, Archangel Azrael is the Malak al-Maut (angel of death). He and his many subordinates pull the souls out of the bodies and guide them through the journey of the afterlife. Their appearance depends on the person's deeds and actions: those who did good see a beautiful being, and those who did wrong see a horrific one.

Islamic tradition discusses elaborately as to what exactly happens before, during, and after the death. The angel of death appears to the dying to take out their souls. The sinners' souls are extracted in a most painful way while the righteous are treated easily. After the burial, two angels – Munkar and Nakir – come to question the dead to test their faith. The righteous believers answer correctly and live in peace and comfort while the sinners and disbelievers fail and punishments ensue. The period or stage between death and resurrection is called barzakh (the interregnum).

Death is a significant event in Islamic life and theology. It is seen not as the termination of life, but rather the continuation of life in another form. In Islamic belief, God has made this worldly life a test and a preparation ground for the afterlife; and with death, this worldly life comes to an end. Thus, every person has only one chance to prepare themselves for the life to come where God will resurrect and judge every individual and will entitle them to rewards or punishment, based on their good or bad deeds. Death is seen as the gateway to and beginning of the afterlife. In Islamic belief, death is predetermined by God, and the exact time of a person's death is known only to Allah.

== Gallery ==
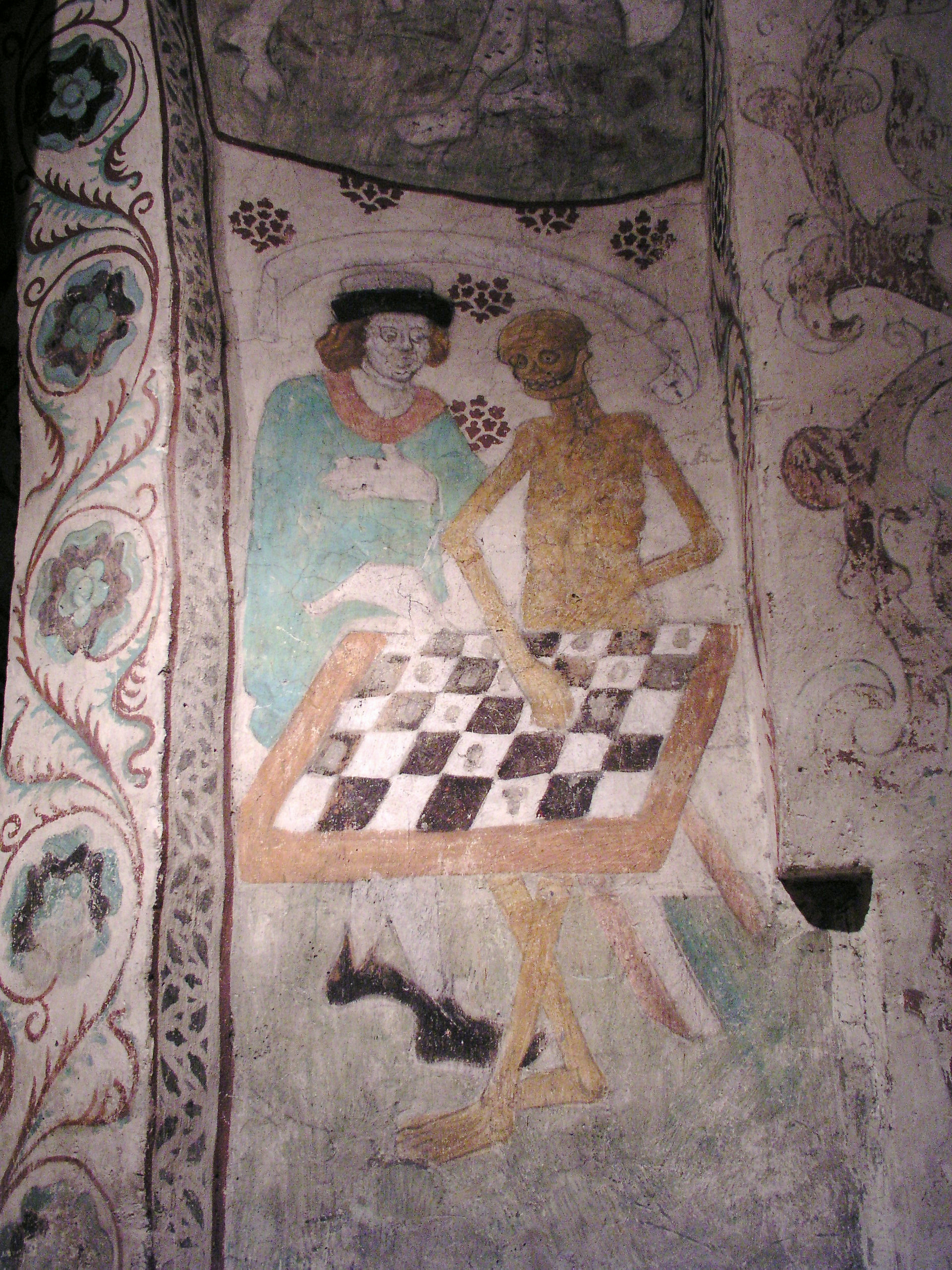
Medieval painting of Death playing chess from Täby Church in Sweden

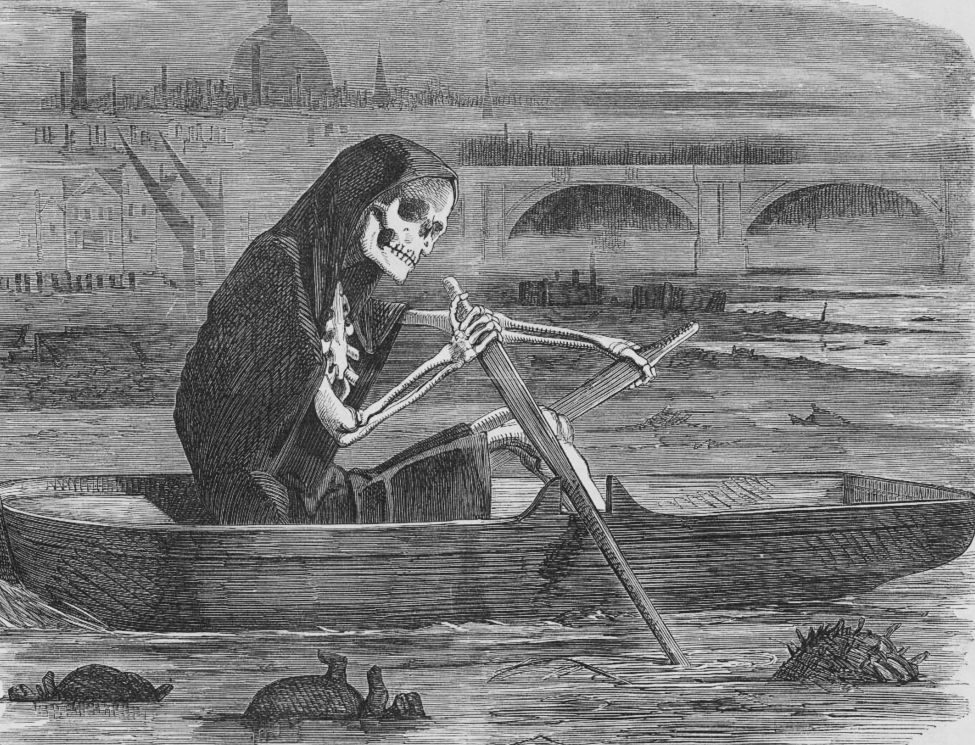
Death personified in Punch

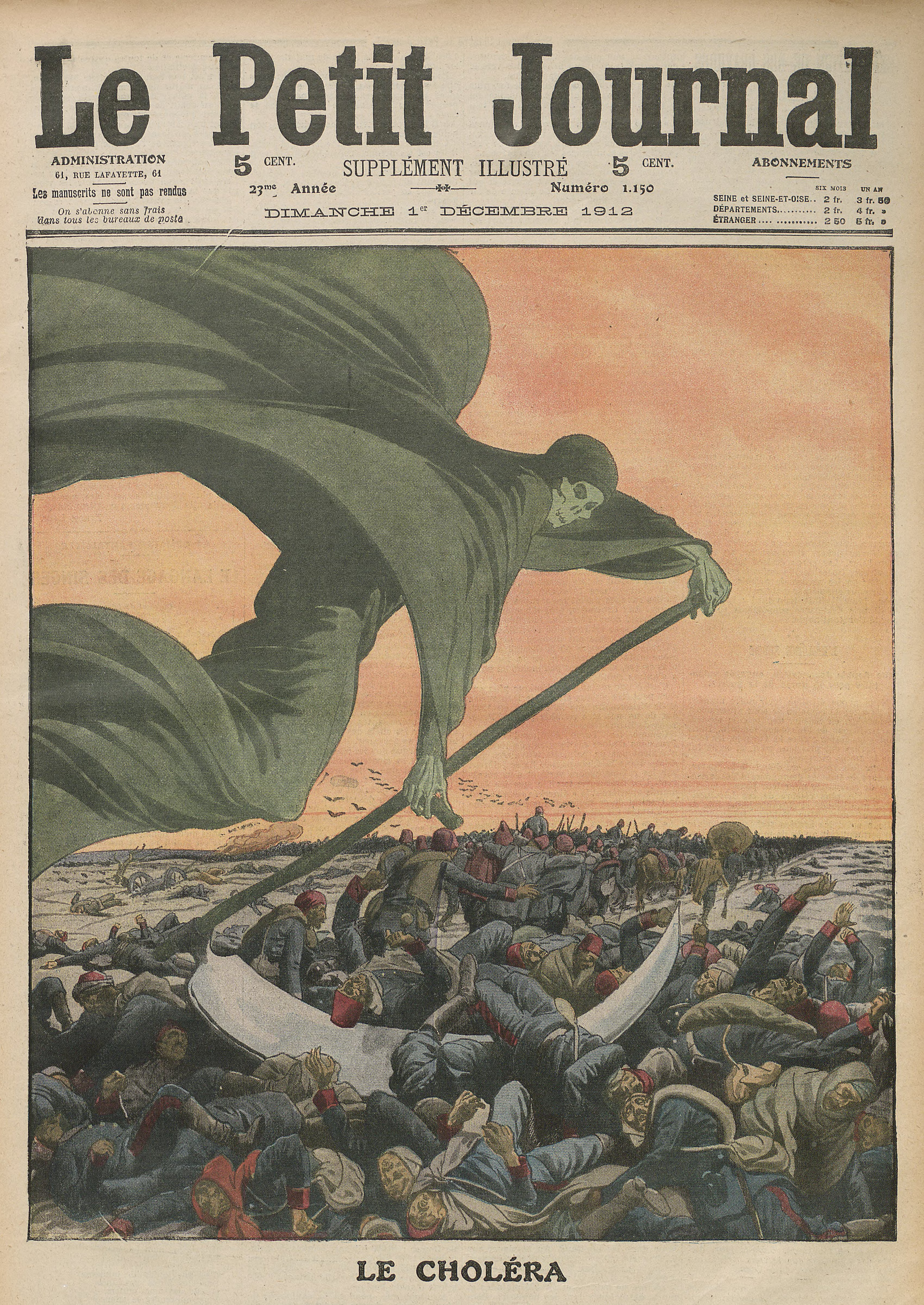
Death by Cholera personified as a Reaper in Le Petit Journal

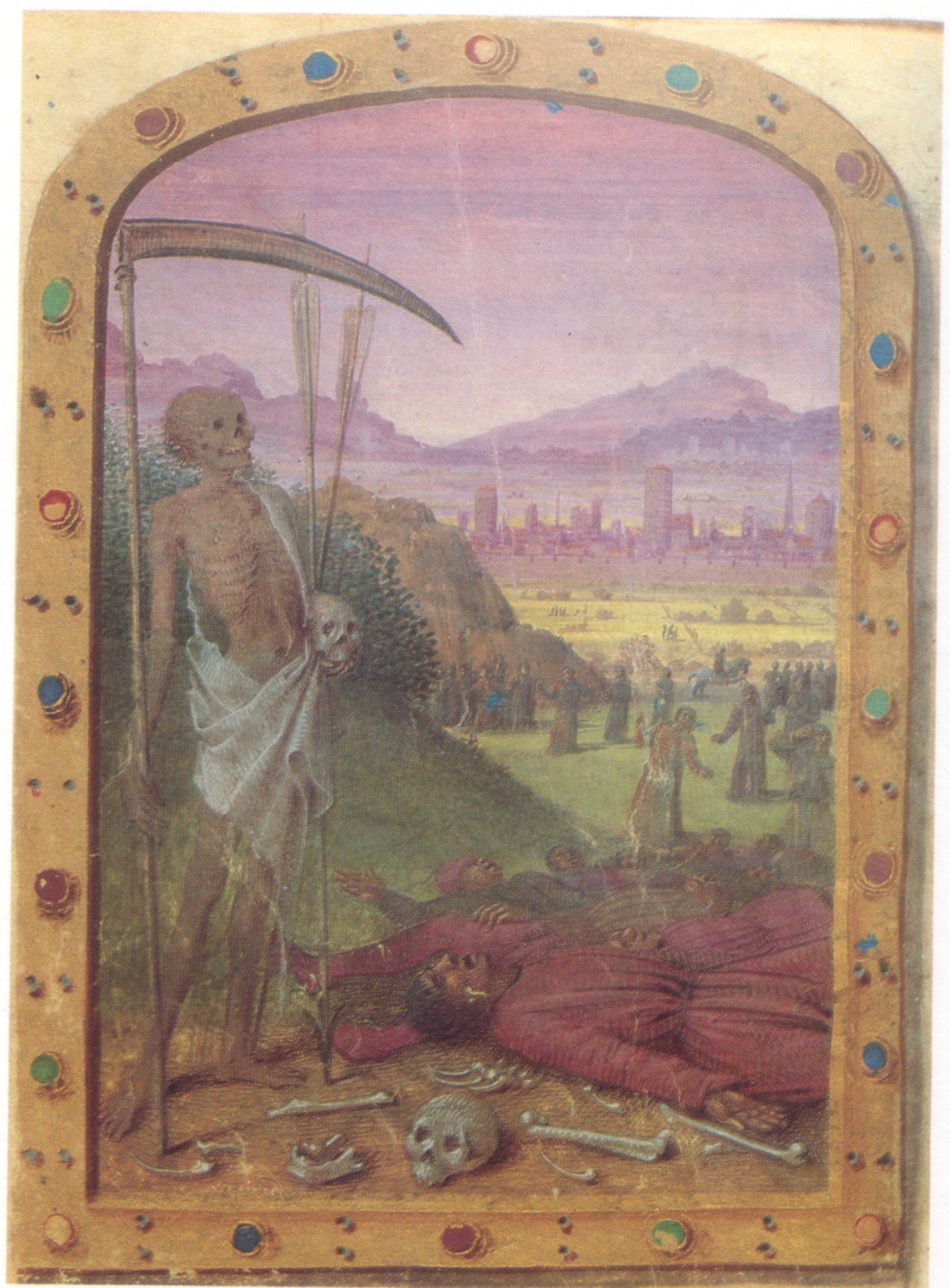
Death personified in de Vauce-Hours by Jean Fouquet

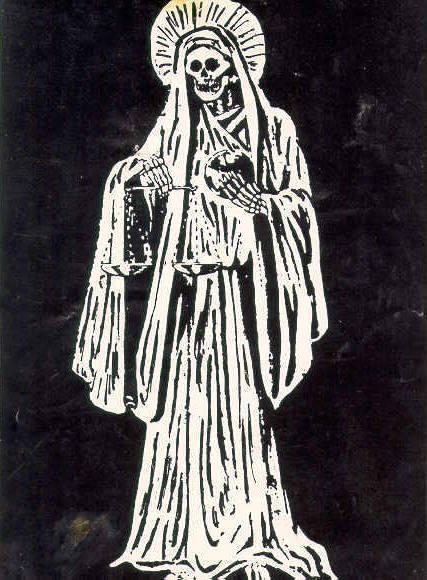
Art from a votive candle of Santa Muerte

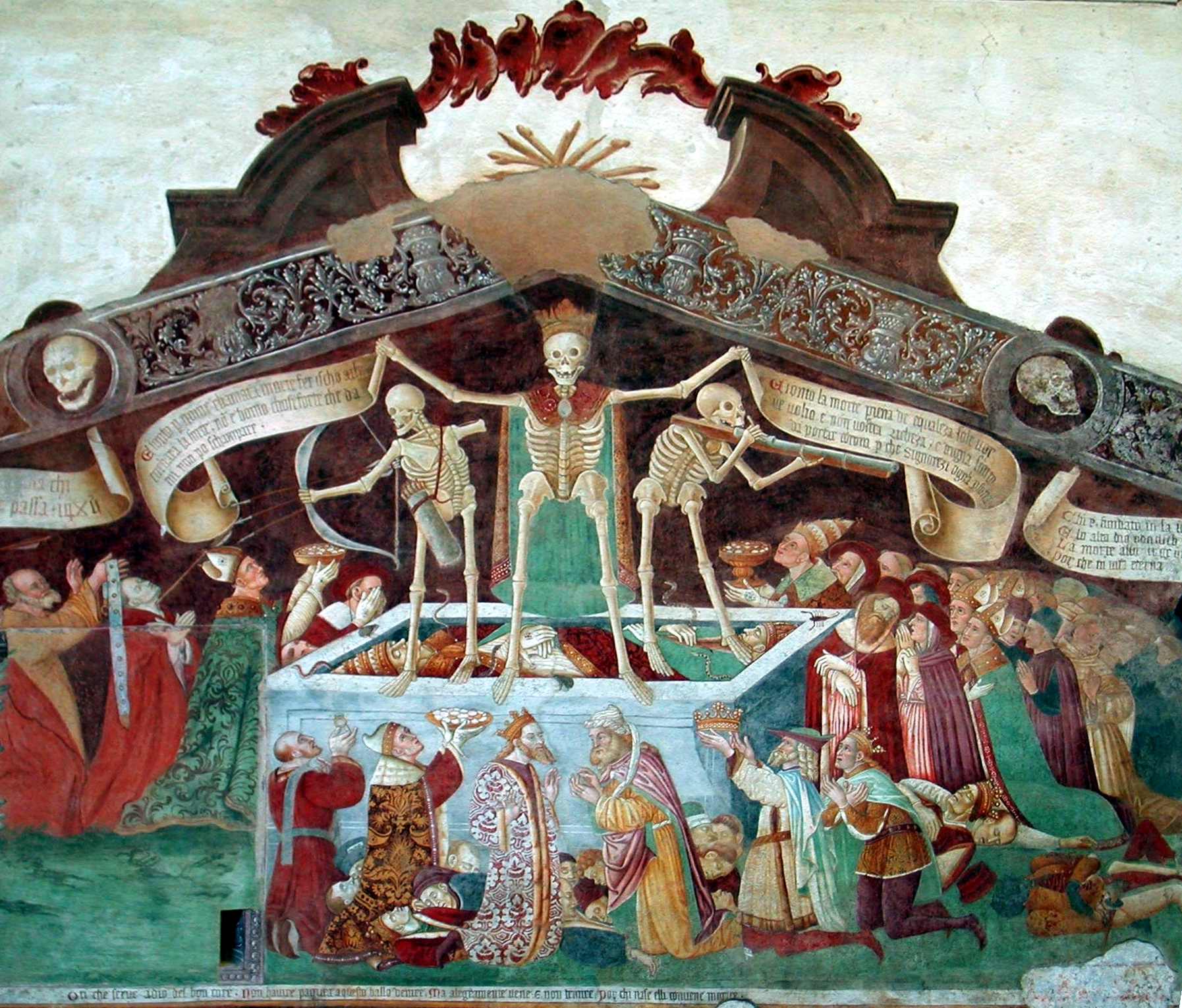
Trionfo Della Morte, painted on the external wall of the Church of Disciplini in Clusone, Italy

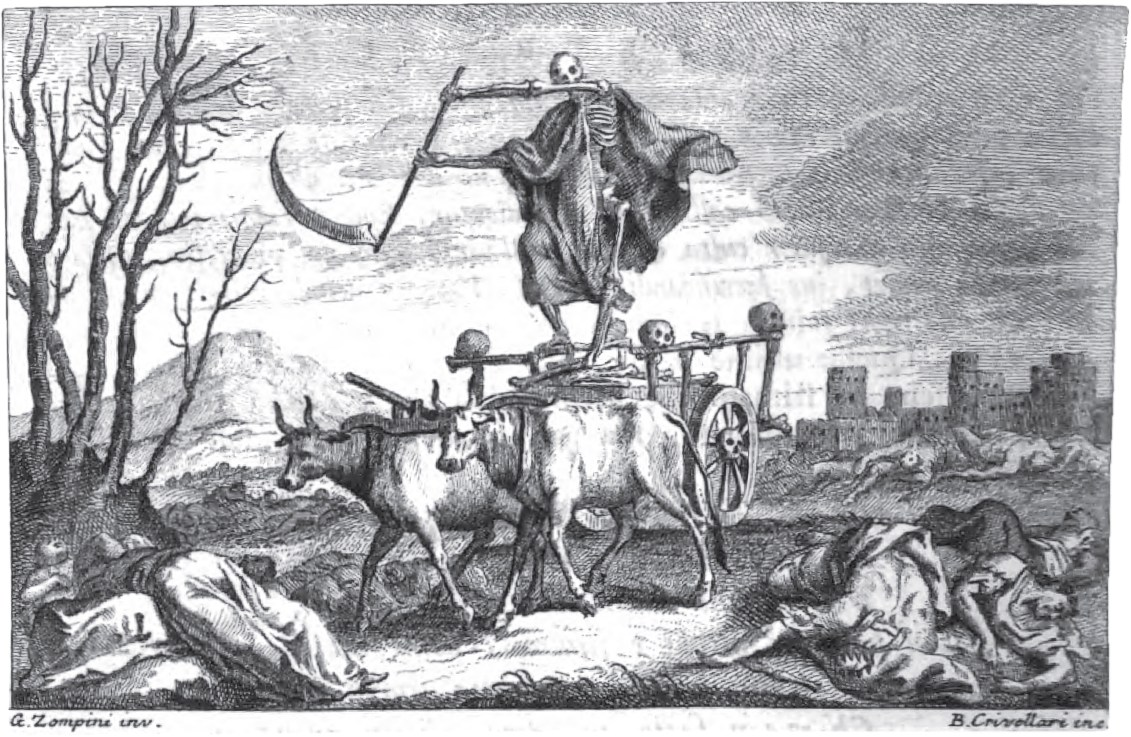
Illustration of Petrarch's Triumph of Death

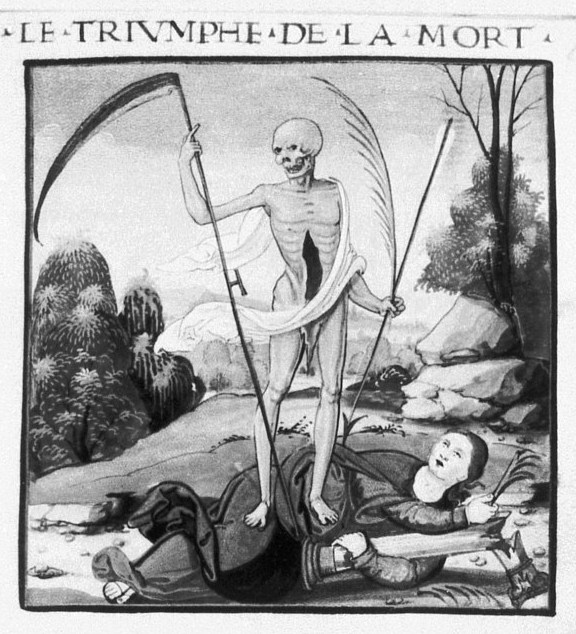
Illustration of Petrarch's Triumph of Death

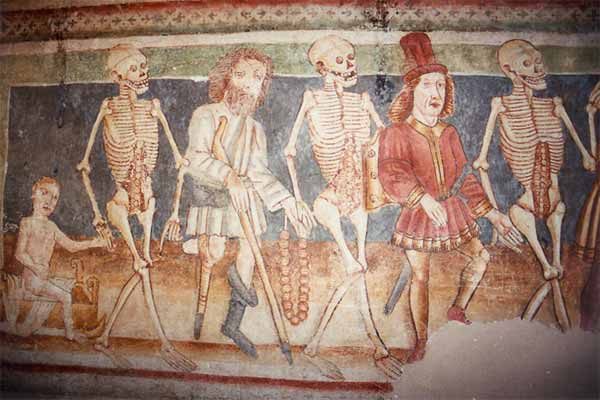
The Danse Macabre in the Holy Trinity Church in Hrastovlje, Slovenia

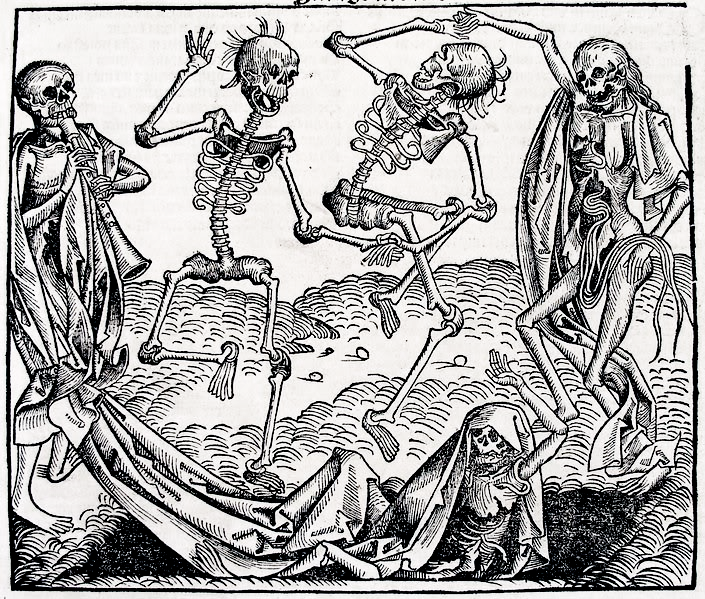
The Dance of Death (1493) by Michael Wolgemut

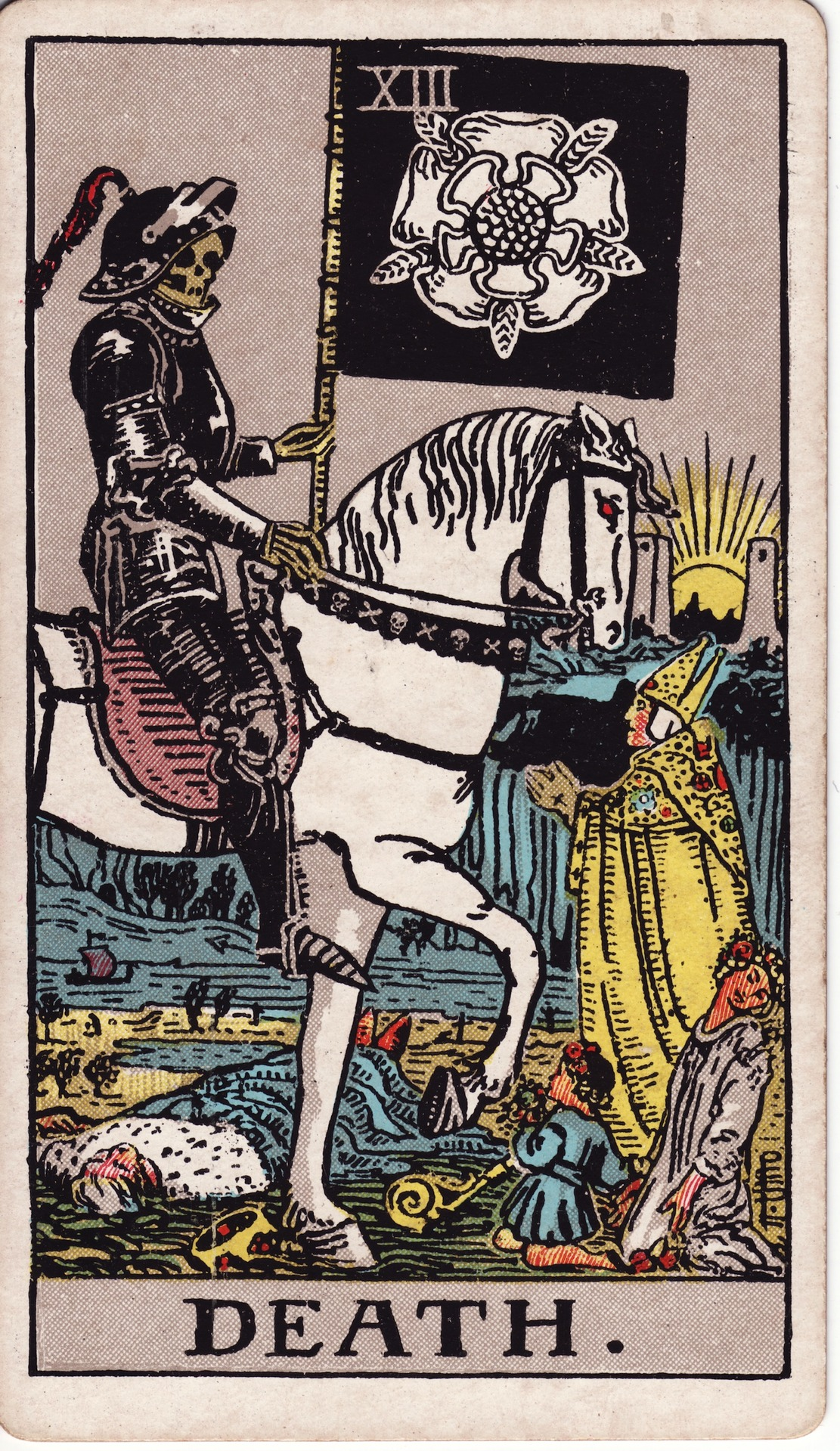
Death Tarot card

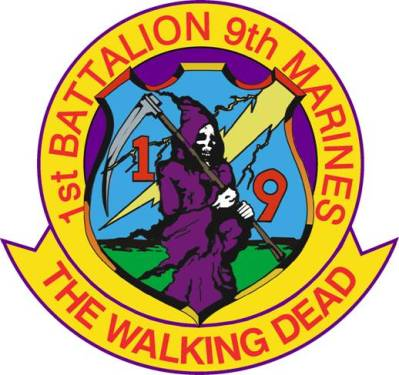
1/9 Insignia

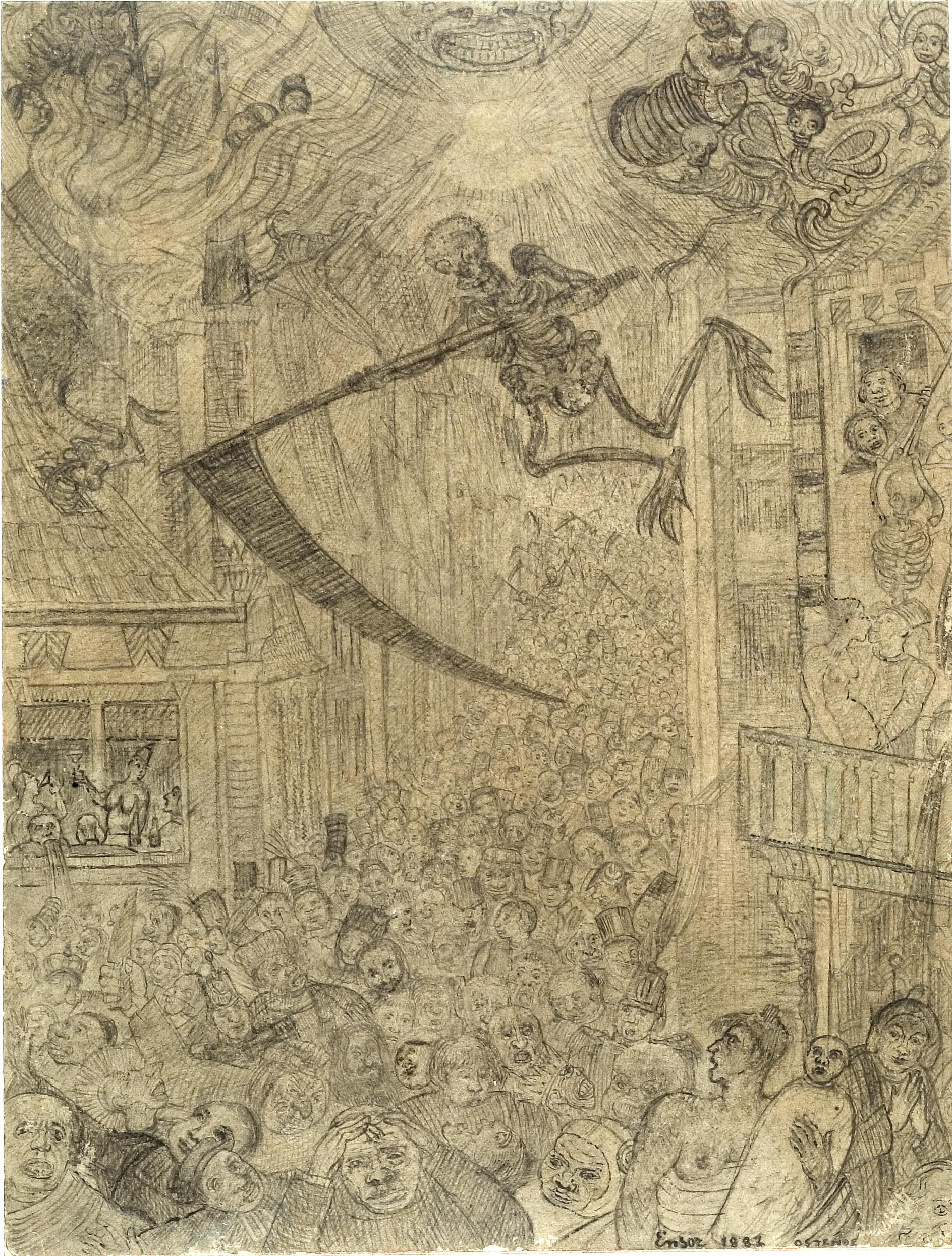
De triomf van de dood, by James Ensor, 1887, Royal Museum of Fine Arts Antwerp

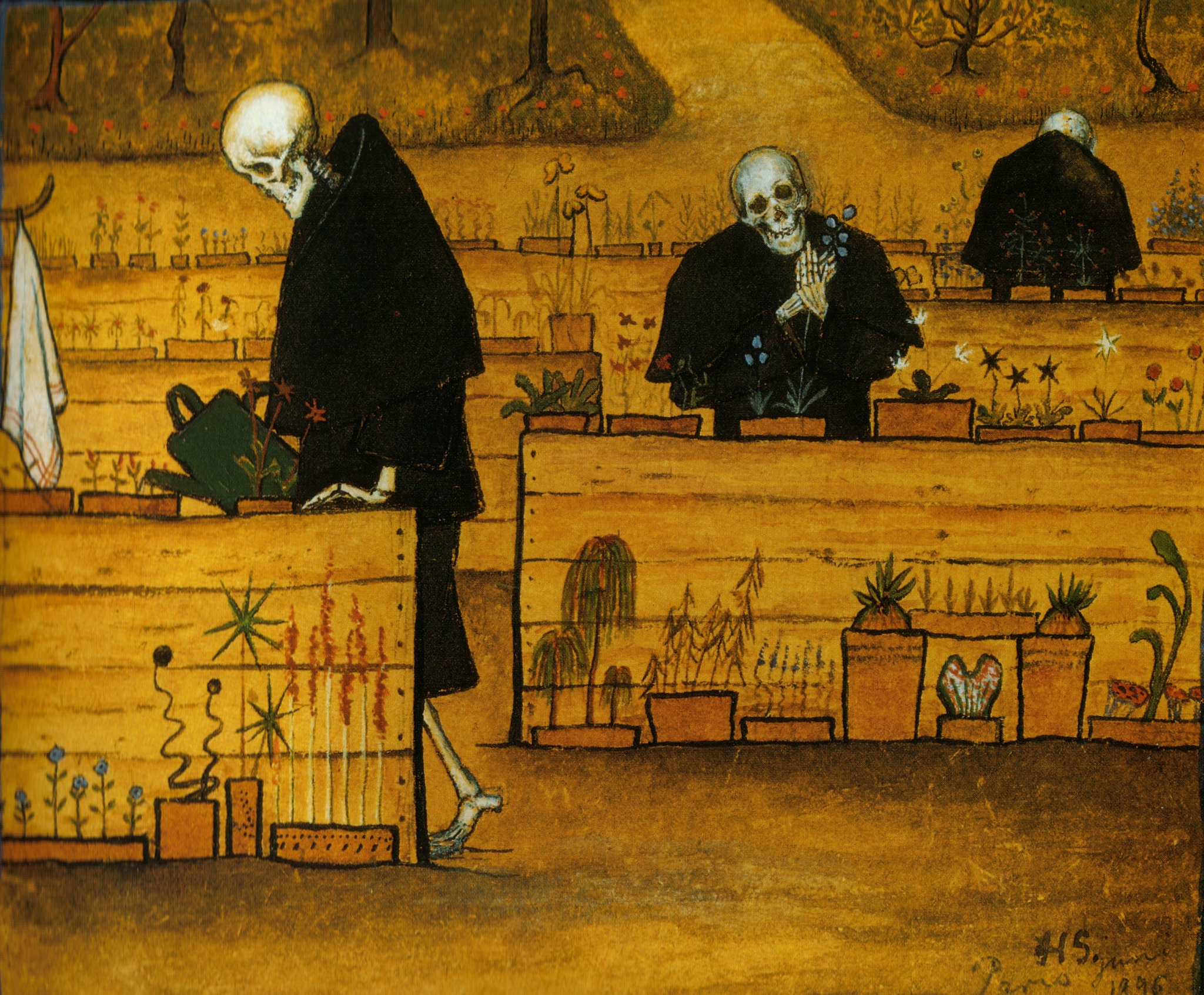
The Garden of Death (1896) by Hugo Simberg

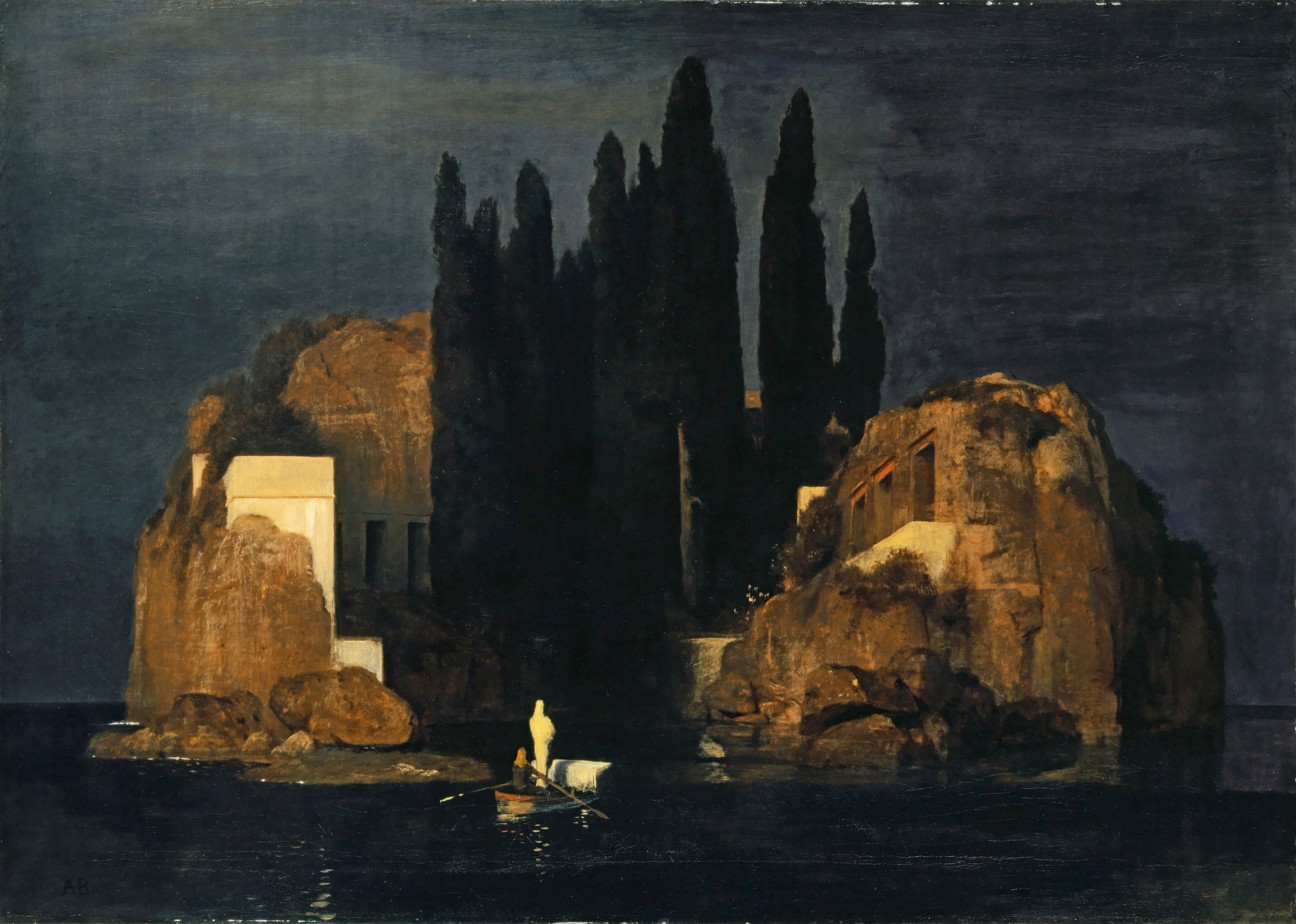
Isle of the Dead (1880), by Arnold Böcklin

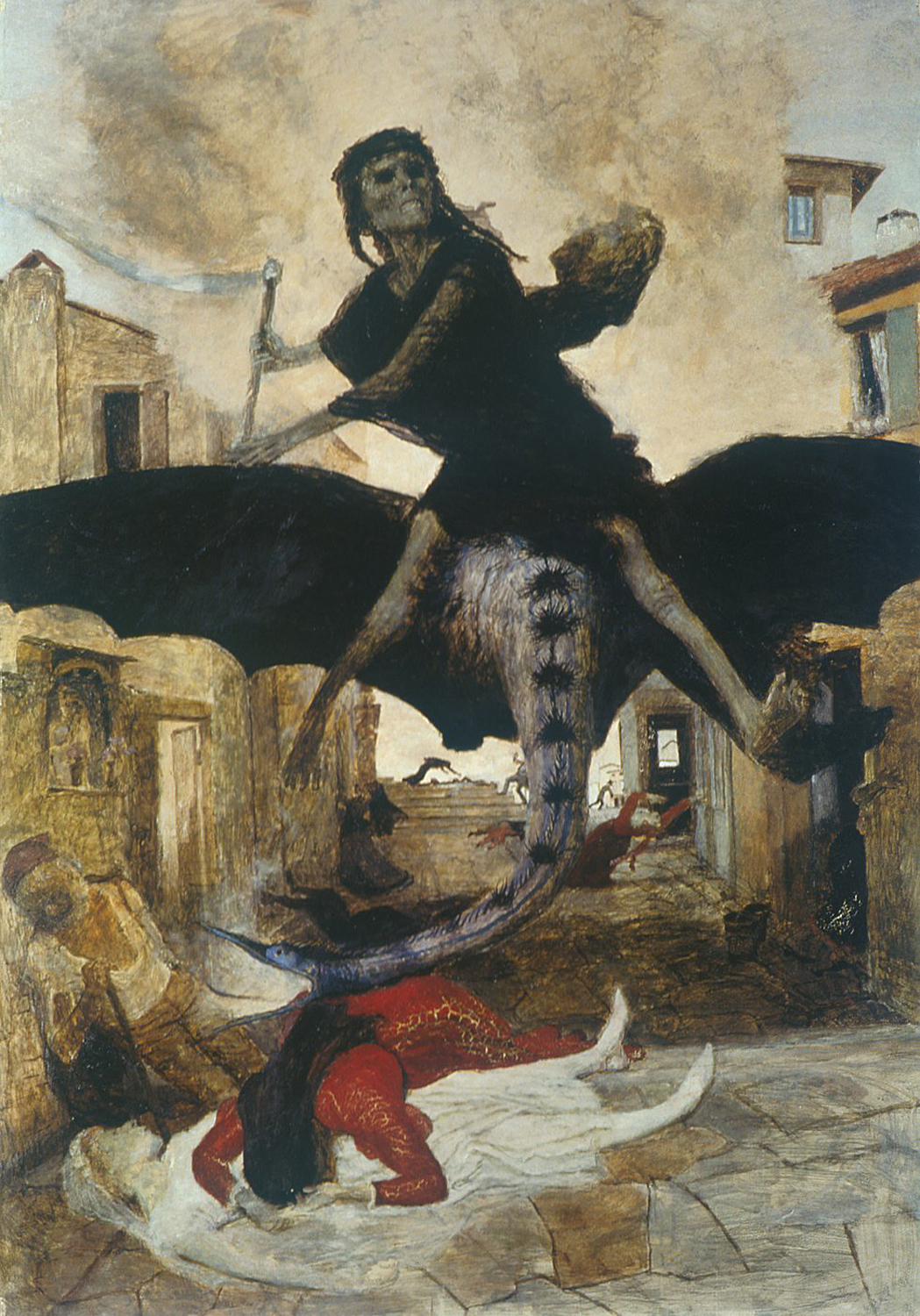
Plague (1898) by Arnold Böcklin

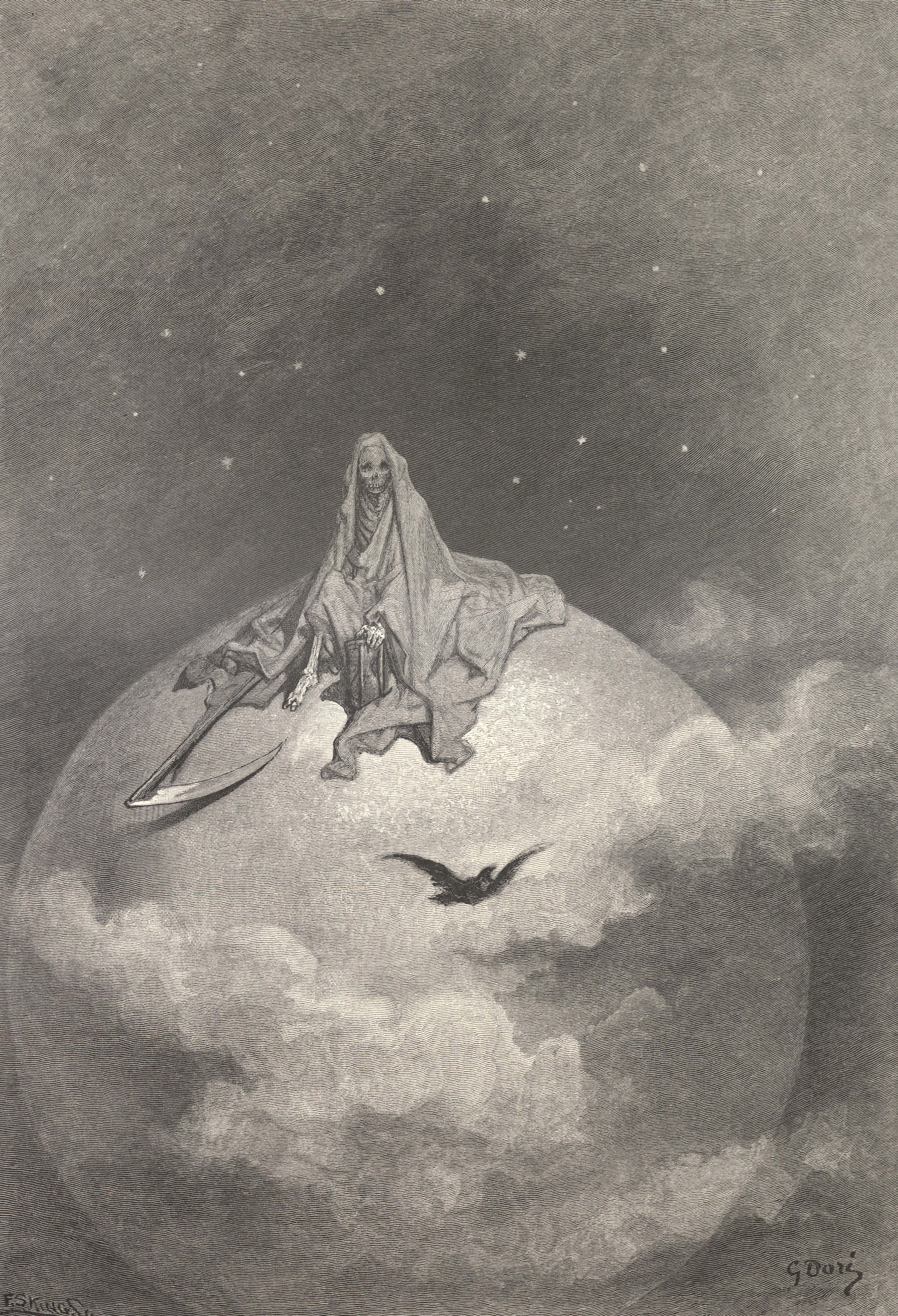
An Illustration by Gustave Doré from "The Raven"

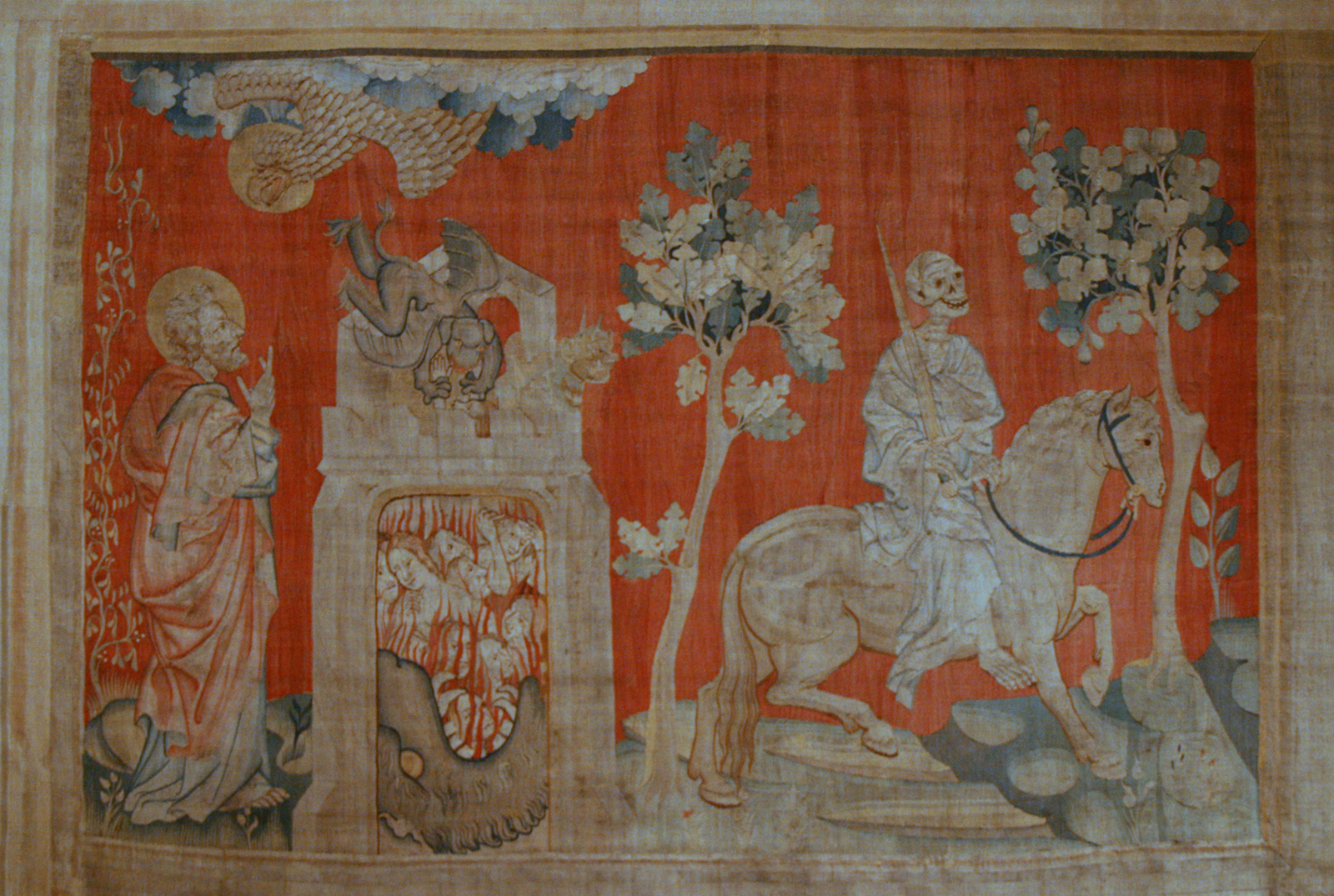
Death as one of the Four Horsemen of the Apocalypse from the Apocalypse Tapestry in France

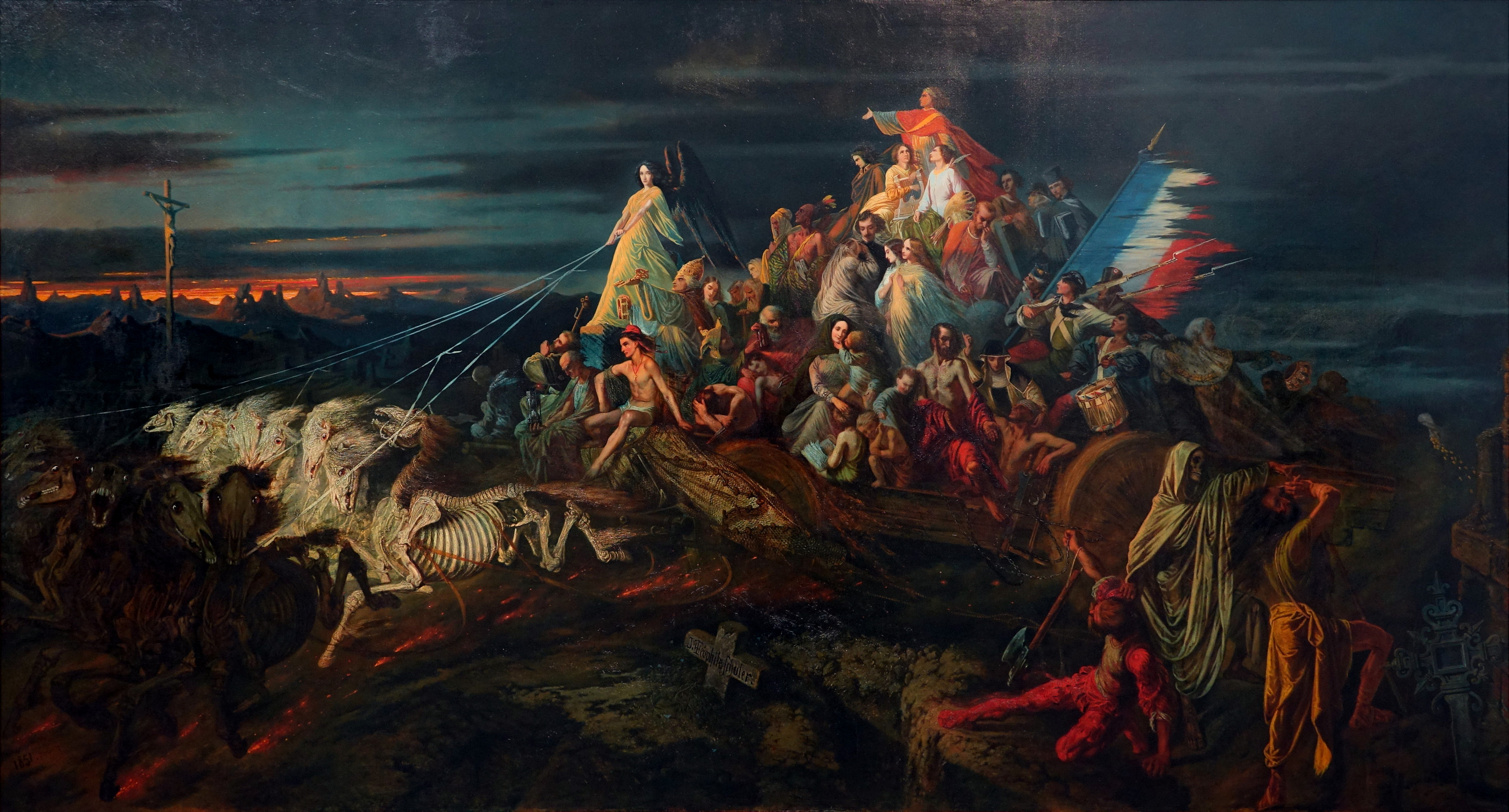
The Chariot of Death, 1848–1851 painting by Théophile Schuler. Death is depicted both as a beautiful angel and as a hideous skeleton.

== See also ==
- Ankou
- Anthropomorphism
- Danse Macabre
- Davy Jones's locker
- Death
- Death and the Maiden
- Death (Tarot card)
- Death (Discworld)
- List of death deities
- Shinigami
- Skeleton (undead)
- Skeleton
- Skull art
- Veneration of the dead

== Bibliography ==
- Bender, A. P. (January 1894). "Beliefs, Rites, and Customs of the Jews, Connected with Death, Burial, and Mourning". The Jewish Quarterly Review. 6 (2): 317–347. doi:10.2307/1450143. JSTOR 1450143.
- Bender, A. P. (July 1894). "Beliefs, Rites, and Customs of the Jews, Connected with Death, Burial, and Mourning". The Jewish Quarterly Review. 6 (4): 664–671. doi:10.2307/1450184. JSTOR 1450184.
- Böklen, Ernst (1902). Die Verwandtschaft der Jüdisch-Christlichen mit der Parsischen Eschatologie. Göttingen: Vendenhoeck & Ruprecht.
- Cantu, Dean (March 2018). "Memento Mori: The Personification of Death." TEDxTalk, University of Tulsa. https://www.youtube.com/watch?v=lvnnqRy6ctI
- Dillmann, August (1895). Handbuch der alttestamentlichen Theologie. Leipzig: S. Hirzel.
- Gordon, Maurice Bear (December 1941). "Medicine among the Ancient Hebrews". Isis. 33 (4): 454–485. doi:10.1086/358601. JSTOR 330623. S2CID 41263628.
- Hamburger, J[acob] (1884). "Tod". Real-Encyclopädie für Bibel und Talmud: Wörterbuch zum handgebrauch für Bibelfreunde, Theologen, Juristen, Gemeinde- und Schulvorsteher, Lehrer &c (in German). Vol. 1. Strelitz, Mecklenburg: Selbstverlag des Verfassers. pp. 990–992. OCLC 234124918.
- Joël, David (1881). Der Aberglaube und die Stellung des Judenthums zu Demselben. Breslau: F.W. Jungfer's Buch.
- Kohut, Alexander (1866). Ueber die Jüdische Angelologie und Dämonologie in Ihrer Abhängigkeit vom Parsismus. Leipzig: Brockhaus.
- Lynette, Rachel (2009). The Grim Reaper. Monsters. Farmington Hills, MI: KidHaven Press. ISBN 978-0-7377-4568-9. OCLC 317921894.
- Milton, John. Paradise Lost.
- Olyan, Saul M. (1993). A Thousand Thousands Served Him: Exegesis and the Naming of Angels in Ancient Judaism. Texte und Studien zum antiken Judentum, 36. Tübingen: J.C.B. Mohr. ISBN 978-3-16-146063-0. OCLC 28328810.
- Schwab, Moïse (1897). Vocabulaire de l'Angélologie d'Après les Manuscrits Hebreux de la Bibliothèque Nationale. Paris.
- Stave, Erik (1898). Ueber den Einfluss des Parsismus auf das Judenthum. Haarlem: E. F. Bohn.
- Weber, F. W. (1897). Jüdische Theologie auf Grund des Talmud und verwandter Schriften, gemeinfasslich dargestellt. Leipzig: Dörffling & Franke.
- Hunter, Dave. Reapers inc.
