= Moïse Schwab =

French librarian and author

- Born: 18 September 1839 Paris, France
- Died: 8 February 1918 (aged 78) Paris, France
- Occupation: librarian, author

Moïse Schwab (Paris, 18 September 1839 – 8 February 1918) was a French librarian and author.

== Life ==
He was educated at the Jewish school and the Talmud Torah at Strasburg. From 1857 to 1866 he was secretary to Salomon Munk; then for a year he was official interpreter at the Paris court of appeals; and from 1868 was librarian at the Bibliothèque Nationale. In 1880 he was sent by the minister of public instruction to Bavaria and Württemberg to make investigations with regard to early Hebrew printing-presses.

== Works ==
Schwab was a prolific contributor to the Jewish press; and he is the author of the following works, all of which were published in Paris:

- 1866. Histoire des Israélites (2d ed. 1896).
- 1866. Ethnographie de la Tunisie (crowned by the Société d'Ethnographie).
- 1871-1889. Le Talmud de Jérusalem, Traduit pour la Première Fois en Français (11 vols.).
- 1876. Bibliographie de la Perse (awarded Brunet prize by the Institut de France).
- 1878. Littérature Rabbinique. Elie del Medigo et Pico de la Mirandole.
- 1879. Des Points-Voyelles dans les Langues Sémitiques.
- 1879. Elie de Pesaro. Voyage Ethnographique de Venise à Chypre.
- 1881. Al-Ḥarisi et Ses Pérégrinations en Orient.
- 1883. Les Incunables Hébraïques et les Premières Impressions Orientales du XVIe Siècle.
- 1883. Bibliotheca Aristotelica (crowned by the Académie des Inscriptions et Belles-Lettres).
- 1888. Monuments Littéraires de l'Espagne.
- 1889. Maqré Dardeqé, Dictionnaire Hébreu-Italien du XVe Siècle.
- 1890. Deuxième Edition du Traité des Berakhoth, Traduit en Français.
- 1896-99. Vocabulaire de l'Angélologie.
- 1899-1902. Répertoire des Articles d'Histoire et de Littérature Juive (3 vols.).
- 1900. Salomon Munk, Sa Vie et Ses Œuvres.
- 1904. Rapport sur les Inscriptions Hébraïques en France.

His most important work is Le Talmud de Jérusalem, a French translation of the Jerusalem Talmud, which was commenced in 1867 or 1868, before the appearance of Zecharias Frankel's Introduction or of the special dictionaries of the Talmud. The first part appeared in 1871 and was well received, although the critics did not spare Schwab. He then sought the cooperation of the leading Talmudists; but he was unsuccessful and had to complete the work alone.

In addition to his work in Talmudic studies, he also produced editions of a number of Jewish Aramaic Magic bowls, though these were described as 'incredibly poor' by one scholar.

- 1882. “Un vase judéo-chaldéen de la Bibliothèque Nationale”, REJ (Revue des études juives) 4, pp. 165–172.
- 1886. “Une coupe d'incantation”, Revue d'Assyriologie 1, pp. 117–119.
- 1890. “Les coupes magiques et l'hydromancie dans l'antiquité orientale”, Proceedings of the Society for Biblical Archaeology 12, pp. 292–342.
- 1891. “Coupes à inscriptions magiques”, Proceedings of the Society for Biblical Archaeology 13, pp. 583–595.
- 1892. “Deux vases judéo-babyloniens”, Revue d'Assyriologie 2, pp. 136–142.
- 1906. “Une amulette judéo-araméenne”, Journal Asiatique, 2e série, 7, pp.5-17.
- 1910a. “A note on a Hebrew amulet”, PSBA 32:(155ff.).
- 1910b. “Une amulette arabe”, JA 10e série, vol. 16, pp. 341–345.
- 1916/7. “Amulets and bowls with magic inscriptions”, Jewish Quarterly Review 7, pp. 619–628.
